= Jean Morel =

Jean Morel may refer to:

- Jean Baptiste Morel (1662–1732), Flemish still life painter
- Jean-Marie Morel (1728–1810), French author, architect and surveyor
- Jean-Valentin Morel (1794–1860), French gold- and silversmith
- Jean Morel (politician) (1854–1927), French politician
- Jean Paul Morel (1903–1975), French-American conductor
