= Mattheus van Beveren =

Flemish sculptor and medalist

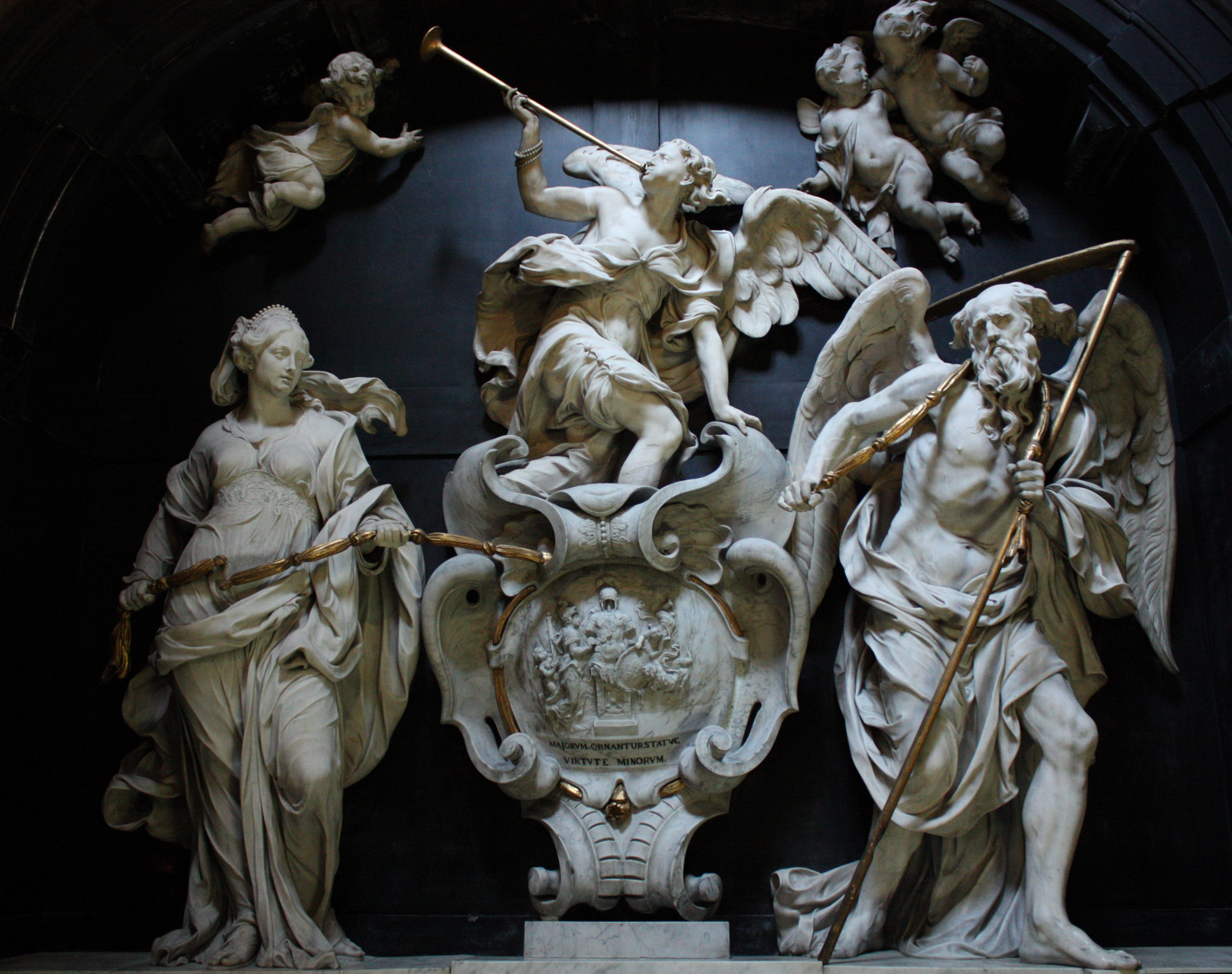
Virtue, Fame and Time, funerary chapel of Duke Lamoral of Thurn and Taxis

Mattheus van Beveren or Matthias van Beveren (1635 or 1636, Antwerp – 25 September 1691, Brussels) was a Flemish sculptor and medalist who is mainly known for his monumental Baroque church sculptures and small wood and ivory sculptures. He also made medals and die designs for the Antwerp Mint.

== Life ==
Details about his life are scarce. It is believed that he was born in 1635 or 1636 as on 27 March 1686, he testified and declared to be 50 years old. The former assumption that he trained with the Antwerp sculptor Pieter Verbrugghen I was due to a confusion with his son Matthias van Beveren the Younger. He joined the Antwerp Guild of St. Luke as a master sculptor in the guild year 1649/50. He was treasurer of the Guild in the 1660s and 1670s. He was the mint superintendent of Antwerp in the 1670s and 80s.

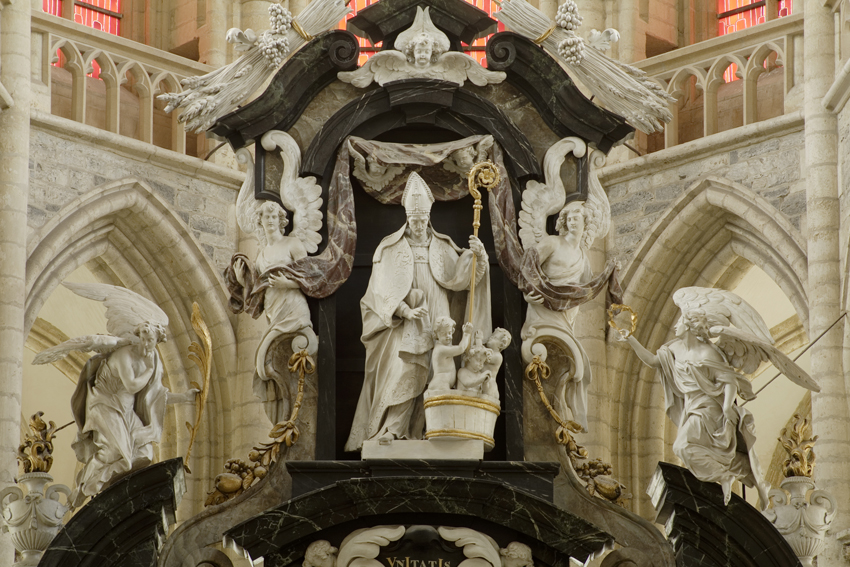
St Nicholas with children in a tub flanked by angels, main altar, Saint Nicholas' Church, Ghent

He married Cathlijne van Hoeck or van Haecken. He fell seriously ill in 1653 and made his will on 8 November 1653. He survived but his wife died. He married a second time in 1658. With his second wife Suzanna Dooms he had 2 daughters, Catharina and Anna Maria, and two sons, Judocus and Mattheus II, who both became sculptors. Catharina married the flower still life painter Nicolaes van Verendael.

Mattheus van Beveren ran a large sculpture workshop with a significant output. In 1656 he was commissioned to remodel the house 'De Cijferboeck' in the Kerkhofstraat in Antwerp. This house was the residence of Frans de Bie the Elder, the father of the painter Erasmus de Bie. He was highly recognized for his artistic work and contributions as an instructor. He trained various pupils including Jan Baptist Santvoort, Anthoni de Winter, Jan Baptist Doms, Peeter Libot, Petrus Bouttats and Jean Cox.

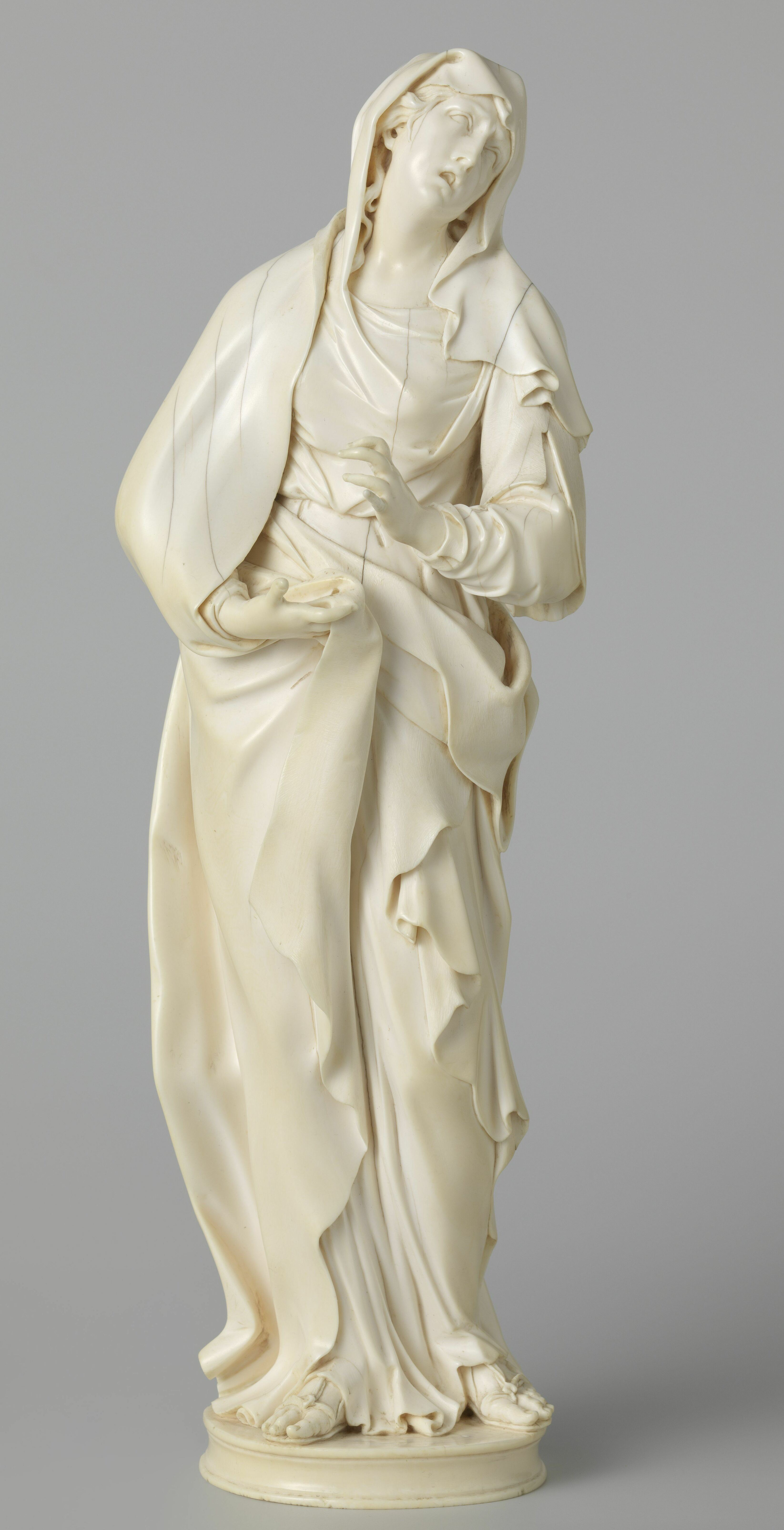
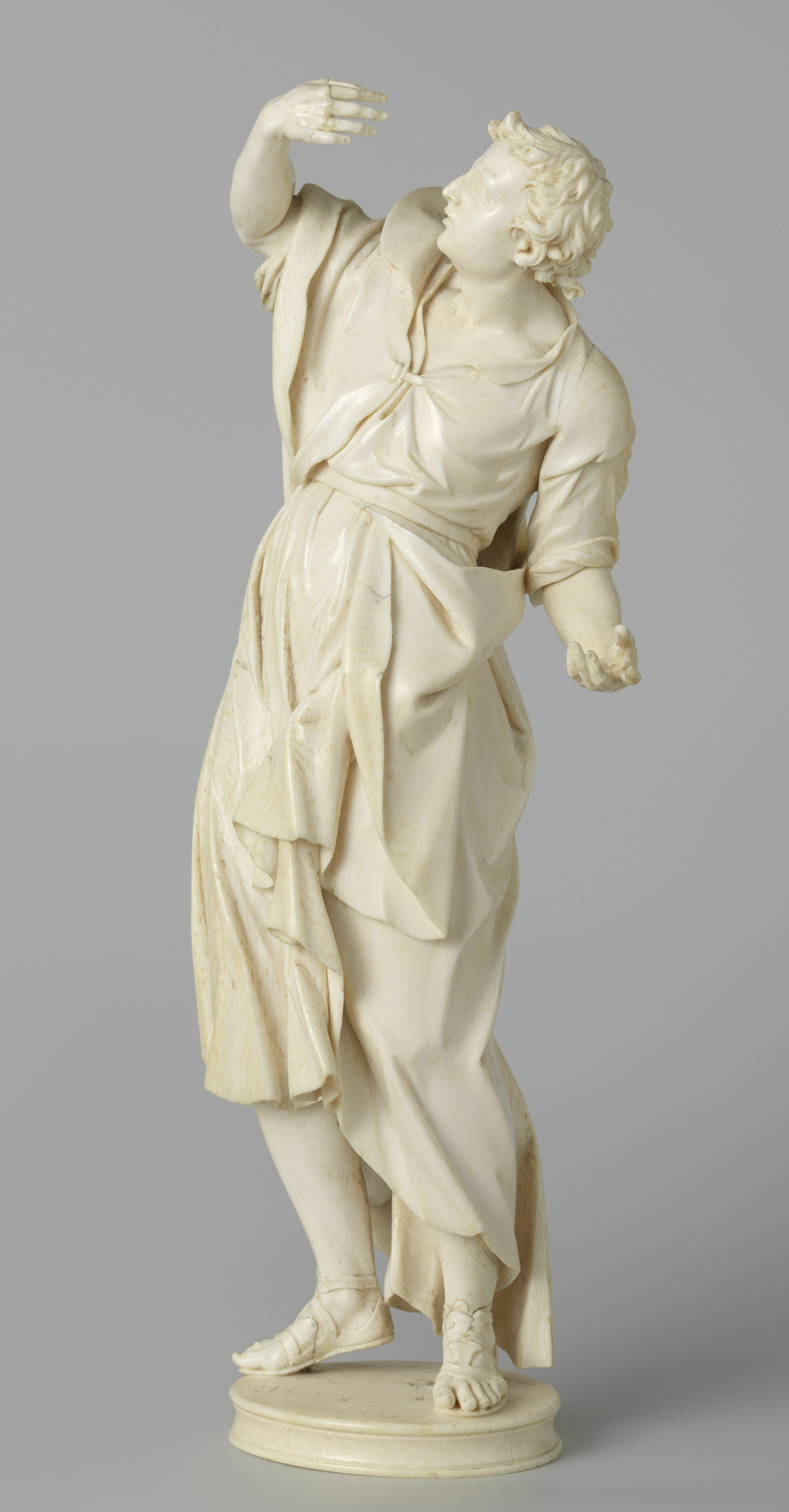
Mary and John the Evangelist

== Work ==
Van Beveren was a versatile artist in terms of the subject range of his sculptures as well as the materials in which he worked. He executed monumental works in marble, stone and wood as well as small-scale works in wood, ivory and terracota. He further was a medalist and produced designs for dies for the Antwerp Mint. Van Beveren's style combines the classicist tendency of the Brussels sculptors Jérôme Duquesnoy the Elder and his son François Duquesnoy with the Baroque realism of his Antwerp contemporaries Pieter Verbrugghen II and Artus Quellinus the Younger who were more influenced by the style of Rubens.

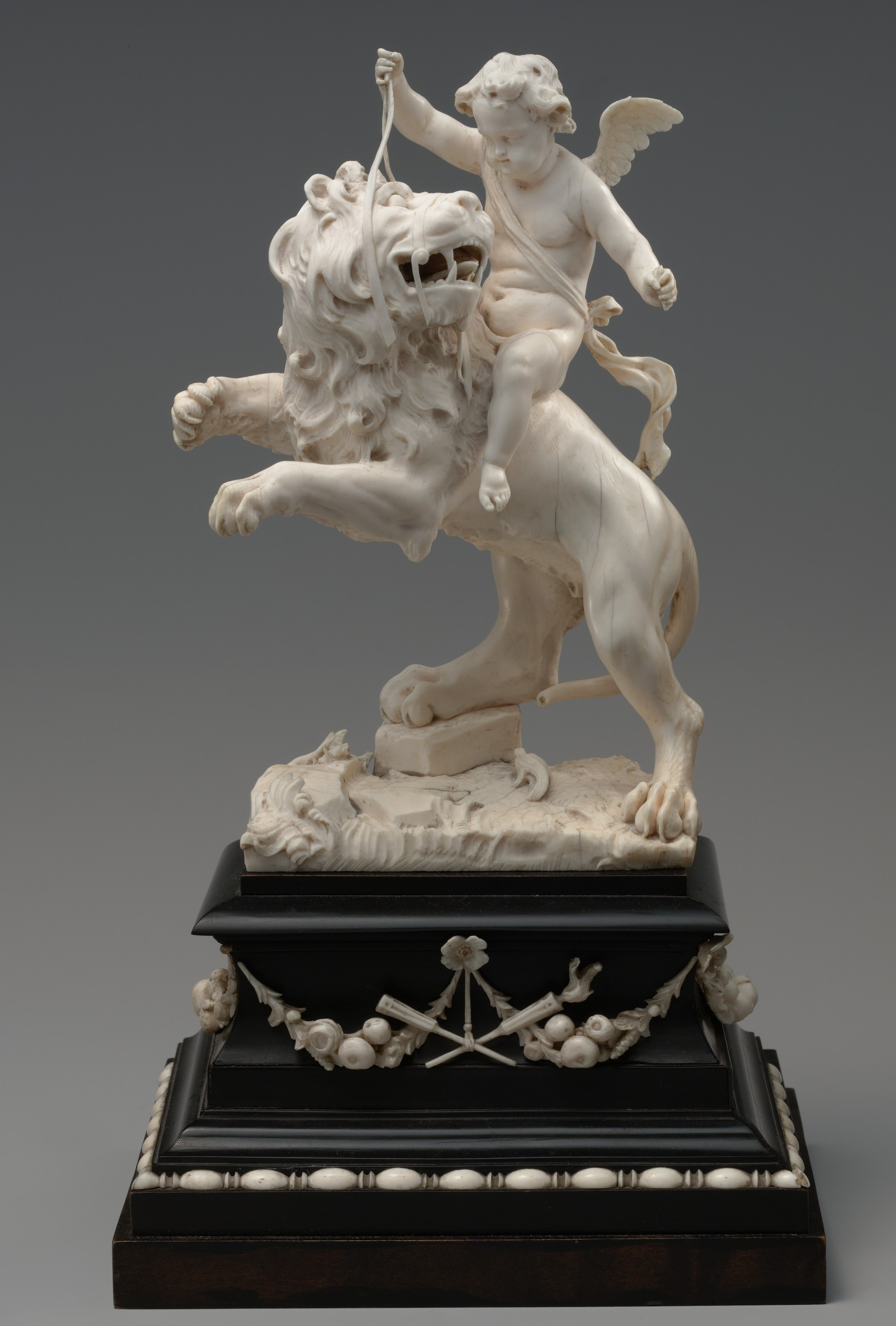
Cupid on a lion

His subject matter was mainly religious but he also worked on portraits and allegorical subjects. An example of the latter is the group of allegorical figures representing Virtue, Fame and Time created for the funerary chapel of Duke Lamoral of Thorn and Taxis (in the Church of Our Lady of Victories at the Sablon in Brussels) of which a terracotta model is kept at the Royal Museums of Fine Arts of Belgium in Brussels.

He executed the main altar in the St Nicholas Church in Ghent. He collaborated with some of the leading Flemish sculptors in the execution of large religious sculptures. He assisted Lucas Faydherbe with the painted wood and stone high altar in the St Rumbold's Cathedral in Mechelen. He made an Angel throne for the Antwerp Cathedral (1659–1660) after a design by Artus Quellinus the Younger.

His designs were used by his large workshop and other contemporary artists in the creation of numerous sculptures. The Brussels sculptor Jan Cosijn, for instance, sculpted the marble statues for the funerary chapel of Duke Lamoral of Thurn and Taxis after a design by van Beveren.

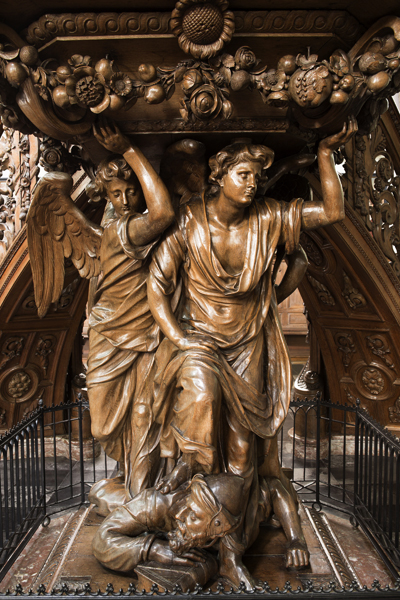
Angels crushing an infidel, pulpit, Church of Our Lady, Dendermonde

Matheus van Beveren was known for his small-scale works, and in particular his ivory sculptures. Beautiful examples are the Cupid on a lion in the Metropolitan Museum of Art and the Maria Apocalyptica in the Rijksmuseum. He and his workshop often used paintings by Rubens as models for numerous ivory crucifixes.

He also made medals, as shown by the terracotta model for a medallion with the portrait of Anthony van Dyck. He further made die designs for the Antwerp Mint.

== Selected works ==
- 1665: Pillar monument of Gaspard Boest in the St. James' Church in Antwerp.
- 1677–1678: Main altar of the Saint Nicholas' Church in Ghent.
- 1678: Marble tomb monument for Lamoral Claude-François, Count of Thurn and Taxis in the Church of Our Lady of Victories at the Sablon in Brussels.
- 1680 ca.: Madonna and Child with Maria and St. John the Evangelist, ivory, Rijksmuseum, Amsterdam.
- 1681–1684: Wooden pulpit of the Church of Our Lady in Dendermonde.
- Oak doors for the entrance to the Augustinian monastery in Tienen.
