= Bellona (goddess) =

Roman goddess of war

- Goddess of War, Destruction, Conquest, and Bloodlust
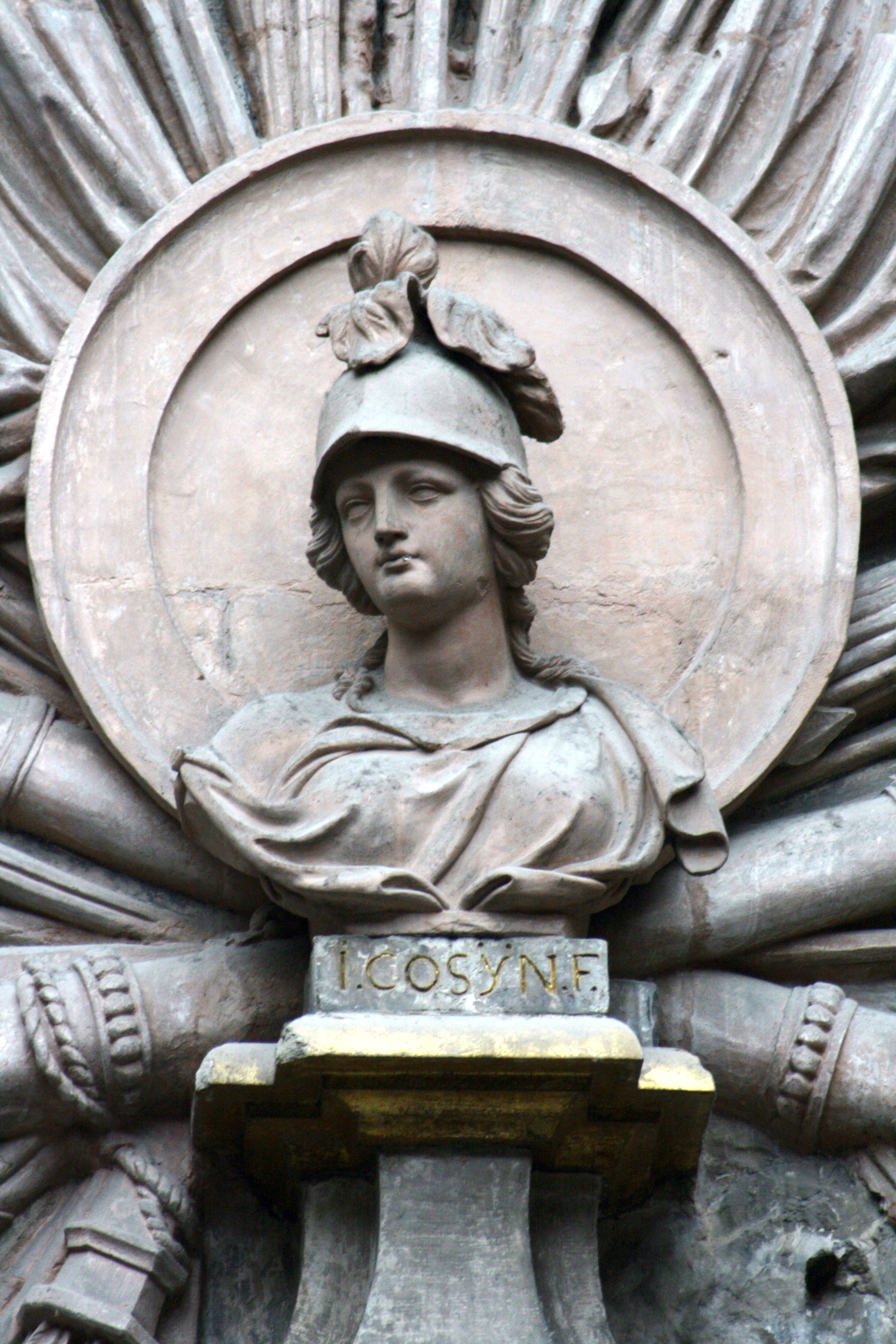
- A bust of Bellona by Jan Cosijn, a 1697 victory celebration over a Brussels doorway
- Symbol: Military helmet and torch
- Temples: Temple of Bellona, Rome; Temple of Bellona, Ostia

Genealogy
- Parents: Jupiter and Juno
- Siblings: Mars, Vulcan, Juventas, Discordia, Lucina
- Consort: Mars

Equivalents
- Greek: Enyo

Bellona (IPA: [bɛlˈloːna]) is an ancient Roman goddess of war. She is generally characterized as embodying the destructive and brutal side of warfare. Her main attribute is the military helmet worn on her head; she often holds a sword, spear, or shield, and brandishes a torch or whip as she rides into battle in a four-horse chariot. Bellona had many temples throughout the Roman Empire, one of which served as a site for Senate meetings prior to the reign of Augustus. Her iconography was extended by painters and sculptors following the Renaissance.

== Etymology ==
The name of the goddess of war Bellōna stems from an earlier Duellona, itself a derivative of Old Latin duellum ('war, warfare'), which likewise turned into bellum in Classical Latin.

The etymology of duellum remains obscure. Linguist Georges-Jean Pinault has proposed a derivation from *duenelo- ('quite good, quite brave'), a reconstructed diminutive of the word duenos, attested on an eponymous inscription as an early Old Latin antecedent of the word bonus ('good'). According to linguist Michiel de Vaan, the use of *duenelo- "in the context of war (bella acta, bella gesta) could be understood as a euphemism, ultimately yielding a meaning 'action of valour, war' for the noun bellum."

== Cults and Beliefs ==
=== Archaeology ===
Archaeological evidence confirms that the Bellona dates back to at least the 4th-century BCE, as the earliest mention of this goddess derives from a Campanian patera dating to this period upon which is painted the phrase "Belolai pocolom" ("cup of Bellona"). Given the ritual function of paterae, which were associated with libation, it is likely that this artifact was involved in some religious activity. However, according to Poplacean, due to the near omnipresence of libation throughout Roman religious life, it is difficult to draw any deeper conclusions regarding the function of this cup. Whereas the exact findspot of the artifact is unknown, the classicist Mary Beard argues that the location of its provenance indicates that it was not a dedication, as it was not uncovered within the temple itself. Beard instead suggests that it may have functioned as a temple souvenir, perhaps removed from the site of the temple.

The earliest known artistic portrayal of the deity appears upon this cup: It depicts the deity—according to the archaeologist Meghan Poplacean—with a long neck, a "calm" and "demure" expression, hair tied atop her head, and several curls of hair. This portrayal is slightly unusual; in later art, Bellona is almost exclusively depicted with armor, and she largely lacks the unkempt appearance found on this cup. The lines in her hair have been interpreted as representations of snakes, which could indicate early associations between Bellona and the Furies, with whom the goddess was frequently associated in later Imperial art. It is perhaps possible that this design was influenced by the Greek divinity Enyo, with whom Bellona was equated. Poplacean, however, argues that—on this cup—the design of Bellona is unremarkable, and her traits are typical of other 4th-century BCE artistic portrayals of Italian goddesses. According to Poplacean, since such lines appear on numerous other contemporary Italian artworks, it is more likely that they serve as a generic symbol for hair curls rather than any unique characteristic particular to Bellona.

=== Association with war ===
Bellona is largely characterized as an embodiment of the carnage and brutality of war. She was identified with Nerio, the consort of the war god Mars, and later with the Greek war goddess Enyo. In the Punica of Silius Italicus, a 1st-century CE Roman author, Bellona is depicted as holding the reins of the chariot of Mars, an image possibly influenced by the role of Enyo as the charioteer of Ares. The 1st-century BCE poet Virgil, in his Aeneid, mentions Bellona as part of an ekphrasis describing the shield of Aeneas: She is—within this passage—mentioned alongside the goddess Discordia. This section of the Aeneid may parallel another verse from Iliad, in which the shield of Achilles is also—in an ekphrasis—associated with chaotic goddesses such as Ker and Eris. However, according to the classicist John Serrati, it is possible that Bellona was not viewed as a wholly negative entity, as—in the prologue to his play Amphitryon—the 3rd-century BCE playwright Plautus lists Bellona alongside Neptune, Virtus, Victoria, and Mars, all of whom were deities with positive connotations. Moreover, Serrati suggests that the Romans did not necessarily view war—and therefore Bellona—as exclusively odious: The word bellum ("war") itself is possibly related to the description of warfare as "bella acta" ("valorous deeds").

Literary depictions of Bellona often emphasize the booming noise and excessive gore accompanying her entry into battle: The 1st-century BCE poet Horace, in his Satires, mentions the "thunder of Bellona, who delights in bloodshed" and Valerius Flaccus, a 1st-century Roman poet, writes "above the open portals appeared Bellona with bare flank, her brazen weapons clanging as she moved." Generally, Bellona and her weapons are covered in blood: Lucan describes the goddess wielding a "bloody whip" ("sanguinem flagellum") and Ovid, a 1st-century BCE Roman author, writes "But their cries are drowned in the clash of arms and the groans of dying men; while Bellona drenches and pollutes with blood the sacred home, and ever renews the strife." According to Serrati, the motif of her blood-soaked weapons may indicate a perception of the goddess as permanently locked in combat, and therefore without the ability to wash away the blood and thus symbolically remove herself from battle.

Beside the Temple of Bellona in Rome was the war column (columna bellica), which represented non-Roman territory. To declare war on a distant state, a javelin was thrown over the column by one of the priests concerned with diplomacy (fetiales) in a modification of the archaic practice, from Roman territory toward the direction of the enemy land and this symbolical attack was considered the opening of war. The Temple of Bellona also served as a common location for Senate meetings: Both the 1st-century BCE Roman statesman Cicero and the 1st-century BCE Roman historian Livy utilized the same term—frequens ("filled, frequent")—to describe the gathering of Senators within this location. Poplacean suggests that, in particular, the Temple of Bellona served as the standard site for the discussion of wartime matters by the Roman senate. Moreover, since the site was located outside of the pomerium—a line of demarcation surrounding Rome—it allowed Senators to meet with and award triumphs to generals holding imperium, who were prohibited from entering the crossing the boundaries of the city. Given the various political functions associated with the temple, Poplacean proposes that the Bellona may have overseen the act of initiating and conducting war in Rome. It was under her supervision where war was officially declared, the Senate discussions concerning wartime decisions were held, and the bequeathment or denial of a triumph was granted—an act that, according to Poplacean, was linked to the conclusion of a war in Rome. The involvement of Bellona within Senate activities may imply that the goddess was not exclusively considered a personification of chaos and savagery but instead possessed a more administrative side.

Emperor Augustus (r. 27 BCE – 14 CE) constructed the Theatre of Marcellus near the site of the Temple of Bellona, leaving only a narrow opening between the walls of the two structures. Therefore, it is possible that any future triumphal processions were unable to pass through the temple and were instead redirected through the theatre. Moreover, Augustus also decreed that Senate discussions regarding wartime matters or triumphs ought to occur—not in the Temple of Bellona—but in the temple to Mars Ultor, which Augustus himself had constructed. Poplacean suggests that Augustus may have intentionally sought to mitigate the prominence of the temple and its goddess, as Bellona naturally symbolized the prior period of pervasive civil wars during the final decades of the Roman Republic. In contemporary literature, she was frequently associated with failed marriage, itself a common metaphorical symbol denoting war in Roman culture. Two 1st-century BCE poets, Virgil and Ovid, portray Bellona appearing at ill-fated weddings: Virgil depicts Bellona as the bridesmaid ("pronuba") of Lavinia and Ovid describes Bellona appearing at the wedding of Perseus and Andromeda. Another Roman author, the 1st-century CE poet Statius, depicts Bellona as a torchbearer at the wedding of Helen. The 1st-century Greek historian Plutarch suggests that the Roman military leader and dictator Sulla—who was himself involved in a civil war—may have propitiated the goddess Bellona. Though, Plutarch also states this goddess may have been Luna or Minerva and was "borrowed from the Cappadocians."

=== Gender ===
Bellona was the only female deity in Republican Rome with links to warfare, and she was perhaps otherwise associated with traits perceived as masculine by the Romans. In some ancient Roman inscriptions, she was associated with Mars and Virtus, the latter of which exemplified martial valor in ancient Rome. For instance, one text from Novara authored by an individual named Lucius Petronius Callistratus is dedicated to "Virtuti Bellonae." Lactantius, a 3rd-century CE Roman Christian author, writes that the god Virtus was also known as Bellona by Roman pagans. The Roman author Pomponius Porphyrio claims that Bellona was equated by some with the Sabine goddess Vacuna, although others identified Vacuna with Minerva or Diana. According to the Poplacean, it is probable that the purported connections between the Sabines and Bellona represent a particular Roman perception of the Sabine people as embodying traditional Roman standards of masculinity and a distant, hardier, and more rustic past. Poplacean further argues that the supposed "Sabine" origins of Bellona may reflect a later attempt to deepen her ties to the Claudia family, a family supposedly of Sabine origin to which belonged Appius Claudius Caecus, who constructed a Temple of Bellona in Rome.

Serrati, however, argues that Bellona was not necessarily a particularly masculine war goddess, and that her warlike persona was not incongruent with her feminine gender. The Romans perceived war as inherently vindicative—the official declaration of war, a ritual performed under the auspices of Bellona, was—according to the 1st-century BCE Roman historian Livy—the method by which the ancient Latins sought "redress" ("repetitae res"). Women were depicted as more vengeful in Roman culture, with prominent women in Roman mythology including individuals such as Lucretia, who declared vengeance upon Sextus Tarquinius following her rape, and Dido, who sought vengeance upon Aeneas following his abandonment of their relationship. Such cultural depictions of women perhaps provided the impetus for the existence of a female war goddess, who possibly personified the notion of war as just recompense. Furthermore, in Roman society, women were often portrayed as reckless and irrational: In the Plautine play Casina, the character of Pardalisca warns her master and his wife about the slave Casina, exclaiming "go away from her, please, so that she doesn’t do you any harm in her rage. Take the sword away from that girl! She has no control over her mind." The perception that women were in some way chaotic may have motivated the creation of a female war deity who herself represented battlefield frenzy.

=== Connection to Cybele ===
Certain temples of Cybele may have also featured worship of Bellona: In Corfinum, a temple to the former goddess also included a statue of Bellona, and Bellona had a temple by the sanctuary of Magna Mater in Ostia. There is also evidence of geographic proximity between temples of Bellona and temples of eastern deities: Cassius Dio, a 2nd-century CE Roman historian, mentions that—whilst attempting to destroy a temple of Isis and Serapis—a nearby temple of Bellona ("Ἐνυεῖόν") was accidentally demolished. The Bellonarii, a group of priests dedicated to Bellona, would wound their own arms or legs as a sacrifice to her. This ritual is reminiscent of the rites of the Galli, who were priests of Cybele that also injured themselves as part of religious practice. Both the Bellonarii and the Galli are mentioned alongside each other in several Roman inscriptions describing these ceremonies: One text from Mainz states, "quomodo galli / bellonari(i) magal[i] sibi sanguin[em] ferventem fundunt ("In that way the Galli, Bellonarii, and Megali pour out their own fervent blood")." Lucan, a 1st-century CE Roman poet, writes "Tum, quos sectis Bellona lacertis Saeva movet, cecinere deos, crinemque rotantes Sanguineum populis ulularunt tristia Galli" ("the worshippers who gash their arms, inspired by fierce Bellona chanted of heaven’s wrath, and the Galli whirled round their gory locks and shrieked disaster to the nations"). As a consequence of her acquisition of eastern characteristics, she perhaps came to be viewed with the same disdain that many Romans held for the eastern portions of the empire. In his Satires, the 2nd-century CE Roman poet Juvenal describes "frenzied Bellona" ("furentis Bellonae") accompanying Cybele ("matrisque deum," "mother of the gods"). These gods are in turn followed by a procession of eastern deities such as Isis or Anubis and Jewish priestesses, all of whom are castigated with xenophobic stereotypes regarding these regions found in the Roman world.

== Temples ==
Her temple in Rome was dedicated in 296 BCE near the Circus Flaminius by Appius Claudius Caecus, during the war with the Etruscans and Samnites. This temple was the first location to have decorative shields dedicated to mortals hung in a holy place. Appius Claudius hung the shields and dedicated them to his family. Later, in 290 BCE, Publius Cornelius Rufus constructed another temple to Bellona following his victory against the Samnite people. Because she was widely believed to be a volatile goddess, she was rarely worshipped openly and most of her worshippers preferred to quietly assuage her. Despite their subtlety, evidence of her worship can be found throughout Rome. At least seven inscriptions that are affiliated with the worship of Bellona have been found, one of which—an early text found in the Forum of Augustus—harkens back to the time of the war with Pyrrhus. Five of the inscriptions are found around the Aedem Bellonae (a shrine of Bellona's) and the other two inscriptions are damaged. The worship of her was not limited to Rome, however. Bellona had a temple as far north as York, England, where the church of St. Peter currently stands.

== Representation in the arts ==
=== Poetry ===
Classical allusions to Bellona later appear in Shakespeare's plays in the appropriate context of warrior characters: Hotspur describes the goddess as "the fire-eyed maid of smoky war", for example, and Macbeth is referred to as "Bellona's bridegroom", that is to say, the equivalent of Mars. In more modern times, Adam Lindsay Gordon dedicated an energetic Swinburnean evocation of the "false goddess" who leads men astray in his poem "Bellona", published in Australia in 1867. She also figures in Arthur Graeme West's World War I poem "The Traveller". There the poet describes himself as marching toward the front line in the company of Art, the god Pan, and the works of Walter Pater. Meeting Bellona as they approach the fighting, one by one the pleasurable companions are forced to flee before the violence of war, until the goddess rejoices in having him to herself.

=== Cantata and opera ===
Bellona appears in the prologue of Rameau's opera, Les Indes Galantes (1735), in which the call of love ultimately triumphs over that of war. In a Bach dramma per musica performed two years before, Tönet, ihr Pauken! Erschallet, Trompeten! BWV 214, the goddess even puts aside her usual ferocity in order to congratulate Maria Josepha of Austria, Princess Elector of Saxony and Queen of Poland, on her birthday on 8 December 1733.

She retains her harsh aspect in "Prometheus Absolved" by Giovanni Ambrogio Migliavacca (1718–1795), however. In this cantata celebrating the birth of the Archduchess Isabella in 1762, the deities sit in judgement on Prometheus, some arguing for clemency, while Bellona and others demand rigour. She also plays her proper part in the 'heroic cantata' created by the composer Francesco Bianchi and the librettist Lorenzo da Ponte, entitled "The Wedding of the Thames and Bellona" (Le nozze del Tamigi e Bellona). This was performed in London to mark the British naval victory over the Spanish at the Battle of Cape St. Vincent (1797).

=== Painting and sculpture ===
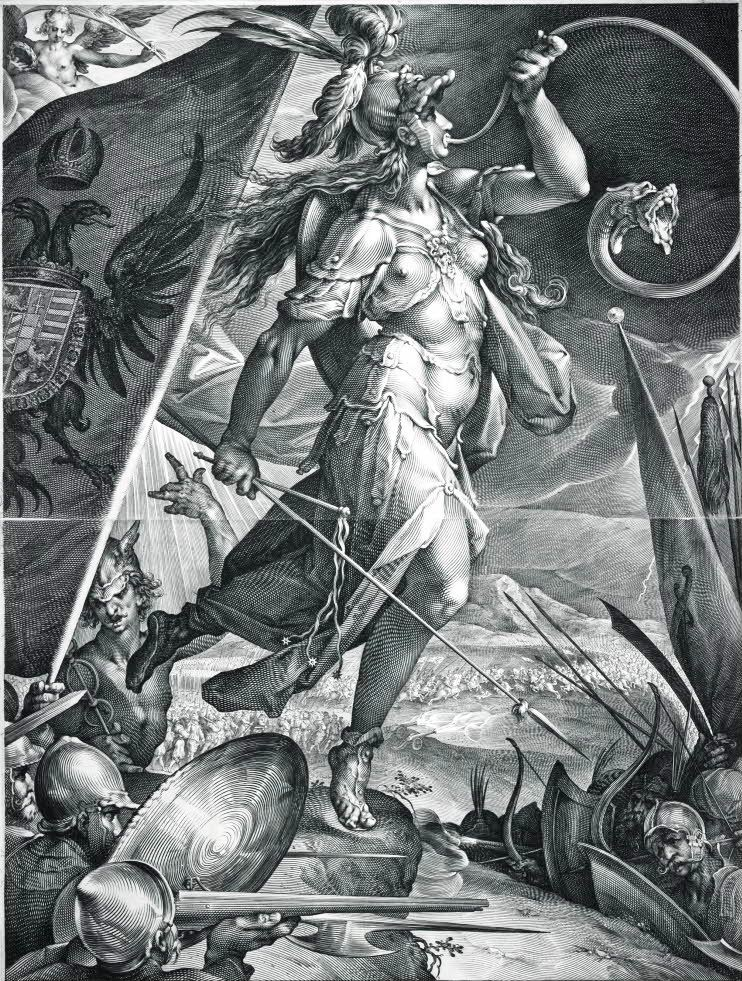
"Bellona Leading the Imperial Armies against the Turks", a 1600 print of Bartholomaeus Spranger's design

Bellona is commonly portrayed wearing a plumed helmet and dressed in armour, or at least a breastplate with a skirt beneath. In her hand she carries a spear, shield, or other weapons, and occasionally, she sounds a trumpet for the attack. Anciently, she was associated with the winged Victory, holding a laurel crown in her hand, a statue of whom she sometimes carries; when she appears on war memorials she may hold that attribute.

Examples of such an armoured figure appear in the 1633 painting attributed to Rembrandt in the Metropolitan Museum of Art, and statues by Johann Baptist Straub (1770) and Johann Wilhelm Beyer (1773–80). In the latter, she appears with the god Janus, since both were associated with the Roman ceremonies of declaring war. In the case of Janus, the doors to his temple were left open during the whole period of hostilities.

Straub's statue (below) has a gorgon head on her shield to instil terror in her enemies, as does the Rembrandt painting, although this was added later, probably as a response to other examples of this new iconographical departure. In the bust by Bertram Mackennal she wears a gorgon mounted on her helmet, while in other depictions it is on the breastplate. Jean-Léon Gérôme takes the representation of the horror of war even further in his glazed bust of the goddess (1892). Not only is she wearing a head about her neck, but the fierce demeanour of the screaming face, surmounted by an angular winged helmet, makes her resemble a gorgon herself.

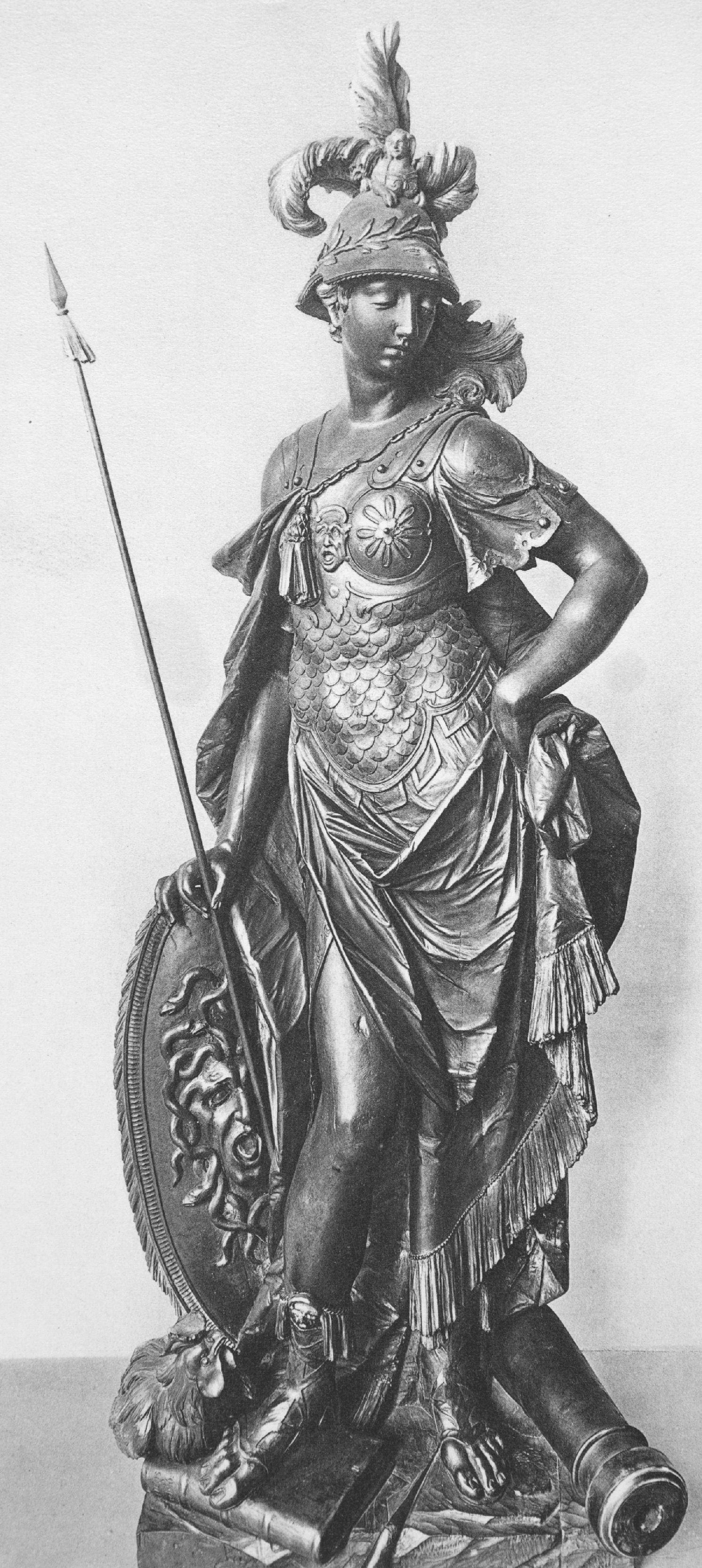
Bellona, by Johann Baptist Straub, 1770

Another common innovation was Bellona’s association with cannons, as in the drawing by Hans Krieg (1590–1645) and the 1700 ceiling fresco at Hammerschloss Schmidmühlen by Hans Georg Asam (1649–1711). An early Dutch engraving in a series of prints depicting Personifications of Industrial and Professional Life suggests that it is this goddess who inspires the invention of war materiels, showing her seated in a factory workshop with all manner of arms at her feet (plate 6, see the Gallery below). In the fresco by Constantino Brumidi in the U.S. Capitol (1855–60), her image is updated. There she is shown standing next to an artillery piece and has the stars and stripes on her shield.

Not all representations of Bellona wear armour. The statues by Alvise Tagliapietra at St. Petersburg (c.1710) and that at the J. Paul Getty Museum by Augustin Pajou (1775/85) are largely naked, although otherwise wearing or carrying some of the other attributes of the goddess. There are Classical references that sanction this, however. In Gaius Valerius Flaccus' Argonautica, for example, appears the description "Bellona with bare flank, her brazen weapons clanging as she moved" (3. 60). A further poetic reference taken up by a painter occurs in Louis Jean François Lagrenée's "Bellona Presenting the Reins of his Horses to Mars" (1766). This illustrates a speech from Claudian's In Ruffinum where Mars requests "Let Bellona bring my helmet and Terror guide the reins" (Fer galleam Bellona mihi, nexusque rotarum tende Pavor). Jan van Mieris’ allegorical painting of "Wisdom restraining Bellona" (1685) is also poetic. There the seated figure of Wisdom clasps the right hand of the helmeted goddess, who is turning to leave, her cloak fluttering behind her and her shield held high in her outstretched left hand.

=== Public statements ===
As well as having a decorative function, representations of the goddess had a public function too. Batholomaeus Spranger's "Bellona Leading the Imperial Armies against the Turks" (see above) played its part in Austria's anti-Turkish propaganda during the Long Turkish War. A later phase of the continuing conflict, culminating in victory at the battle of Zenta in 1697, is marked by Jan Cosijn's celebratory doorway in Brussels in what now is known as the Maison de Bellone, at the centre of which presides the helmeted bust of the goddess surrounded by military standards and cannons.

A dynastic political statement is made in "Marie de Medici as Bellona" (1622/5), designed by Peter Paul Rubens for her public rooms in the Luxembourg Palace. He represents her there as a wielder of political power at a time when it, in fact, had waned. She is standing with armour, cannons, and muskets at her feet, and her triumphs are underlined by emblems of victory. She carries a small statue of the winged goddess in her right hand, a smaller winged figure is mounted below the plumes of her helmet, while cupids hover above her, holding a laurel crown. Her portrayal contrasts with Rembrandt's depiction of Bellona with the homely features of an ordinary Dutchwoman. This makes an anti-imperial statement, with the assurance that the new Dutch Republic is ready to defend itself, particularly against Spain, during the Thirty Years' War.

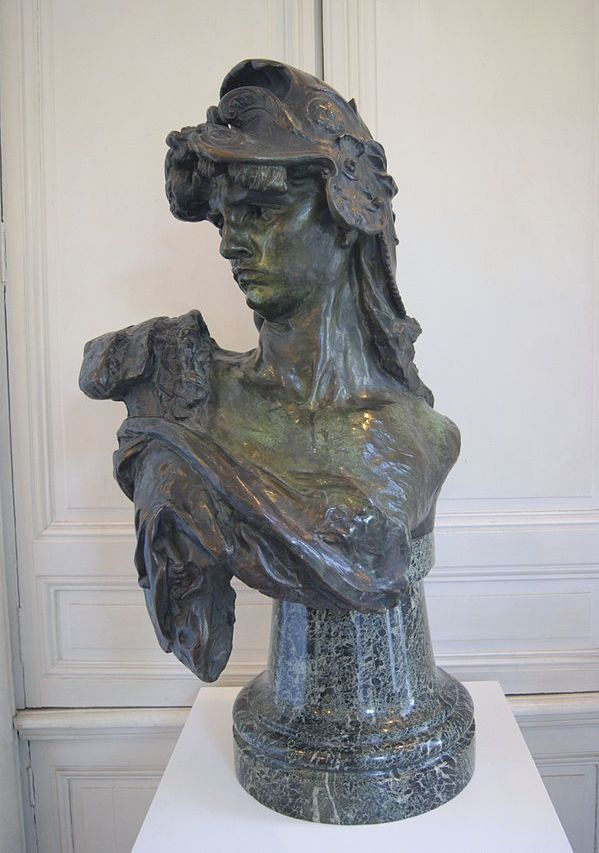
Auguste Rodin's 1879 bronze bust of Bellona in the Musée Rodin, Paris

Auguste Rodin's sculpture of a head of Bellona (1879) originally was created for a monument to the French Third Republic and shows even more belligerence. Modelled on his mistress Rose Beuret while in a bad mood, the head is drawn back in proud anger, turning in dynamic movement to look along the line of her right shoulder. Defence in war is the message of Georg Kolbe's Bellona fountain in Wuppertal. Originally commissioned in 1915, it depicted the helmeted goddess carrying a sword in her left hand and inspiring a kneeling young man. The statue was not erected until 1922, by which time it functioned as a war memorial.

The use of Bellona in such structures was well established before this, dating back to her prominent use in Jean Cosyn's doorway. The Temple of Bellona, designed by William Chambers for Kew Gardens in 1760, was projected as a celebration of the Anglo-Hanoverian war effort during the Seven Years' War and eventually housed plaques honouring the regiments that served in it. These, however, related primarily to remembrance of victory rather than of the fallen. It was not until a century afterward that the French-Canadian victims of the Seven Years War were commemorated by a monument at Quebec. Atop a tall column on the site of the battlefield, Bellona looks down, carrying a shield and laurel crown in her right hand. The statue was presented by Jérôme-Napoléon in 1862 as a gesture of reconciliation.

The Australian dead from the Gallipoli Campaign were commemorated by a bronze bust of Bellona by Bertram Mackennal, a former student of Rodin. This he presented to the Australian government in Canberra as a memorial in 1916. As in Rodin's bust, the helmeted head is turned to the right, but the breasts are more in evidence. The fallen generally make their appearance later in such structures where Bellona is present. They accompany the sword-wielding goddess in Douglas Tilden's monument to the California Volunteers during the Spanish–American War of 1898; in the Białystok memorial to the dead in the Polish–Soviet War in 1920, she stands behind a soldier and holds aloft a laurel crown. A statue of Bellona is featured on the Victory Arch commemorating World War I at London Waterloo station. She is depicted wielding a sword and standing above a group of figures, including cowering women and children.

== Gallery ==
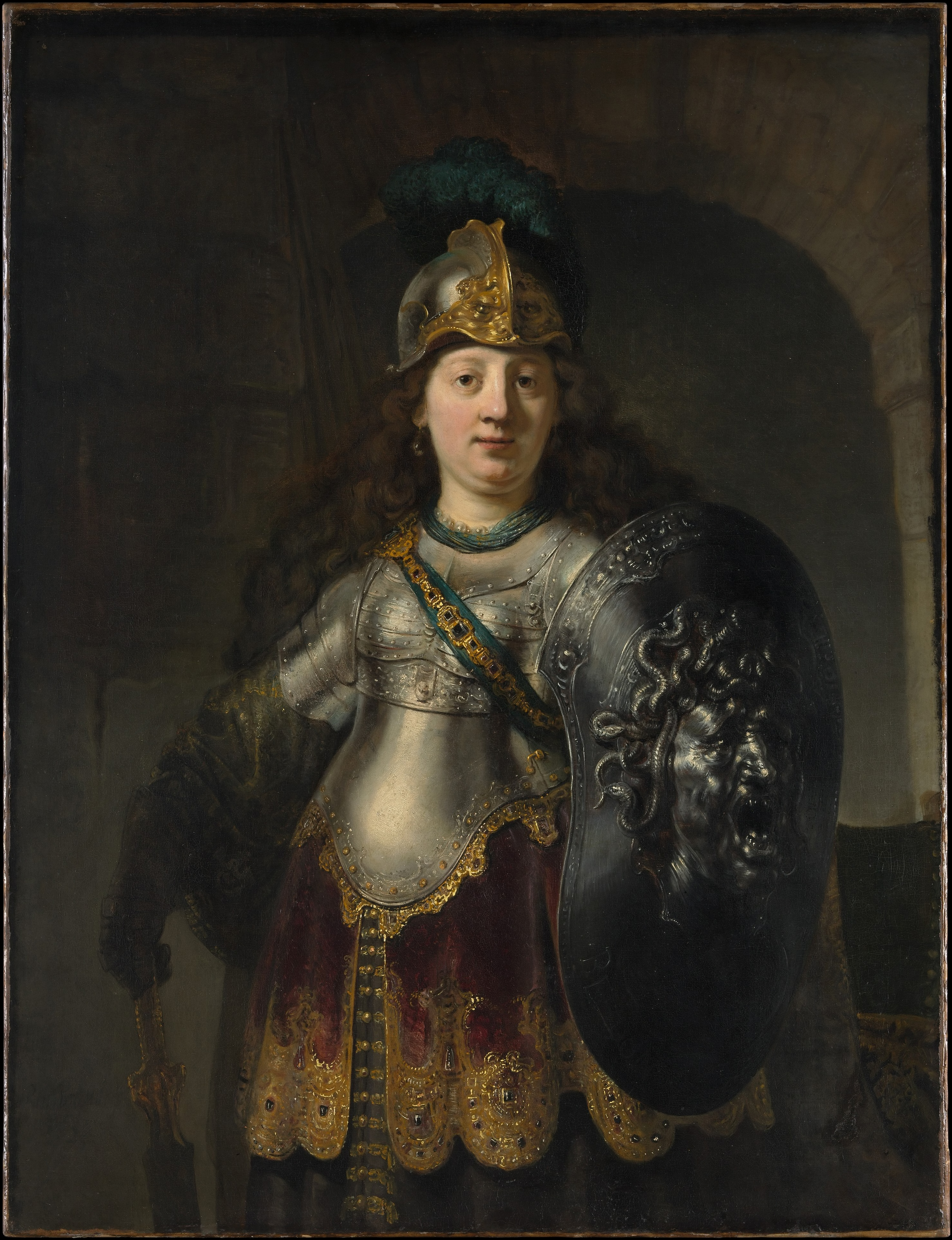
Bellona in armour, attributed to Rembrandt, 1633

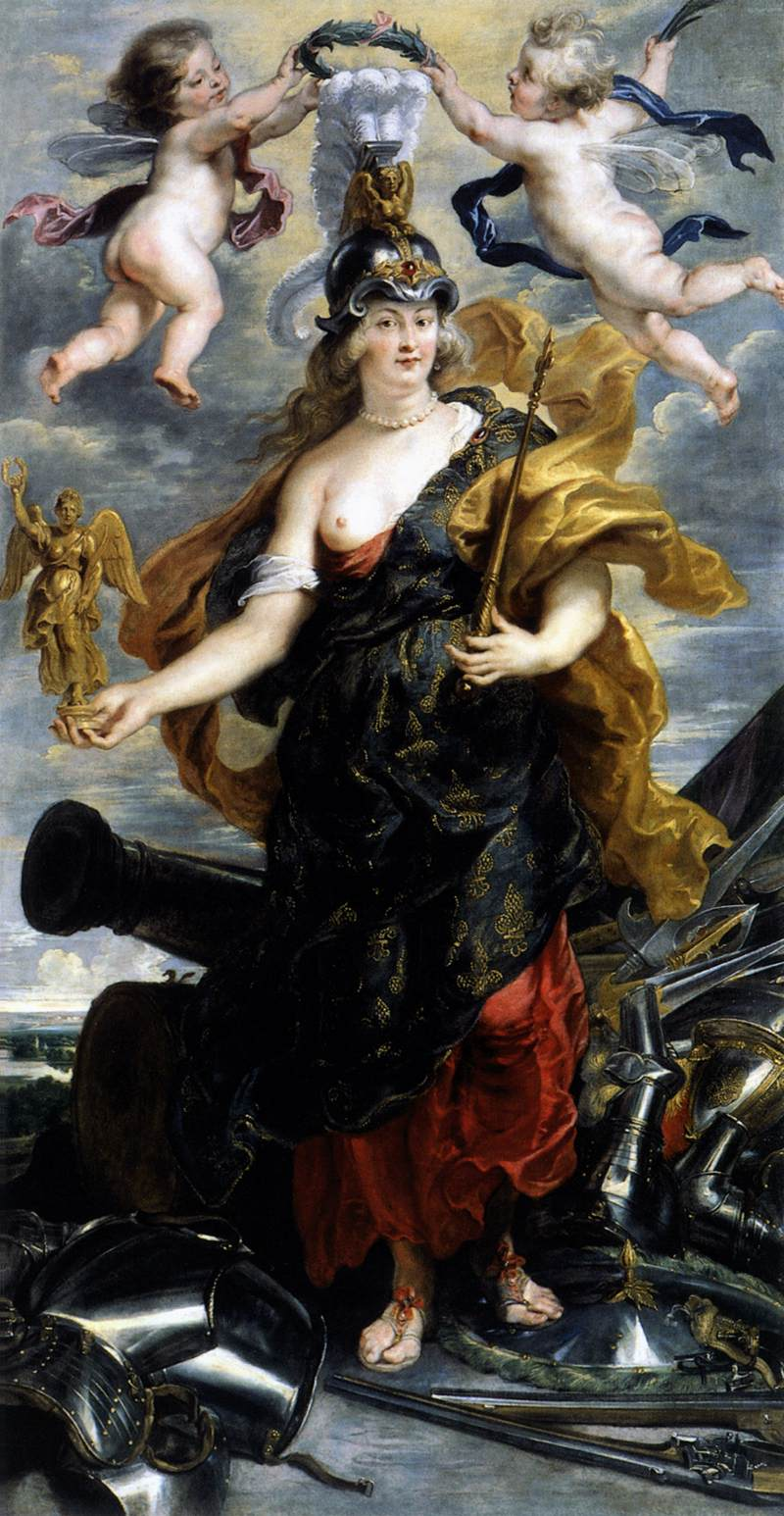
"Marie de Medici as Bellona" by Peter Paul Rubens, 1621–1625

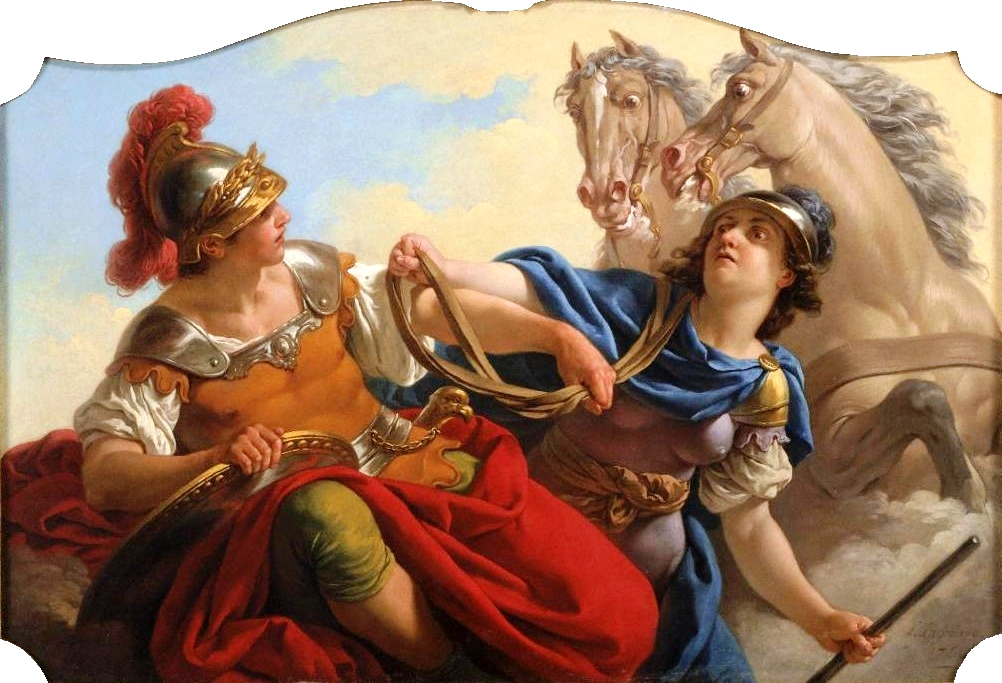
Bellona Presenting the Reins of his Horses to Mars, Louis Jean François Lagrenée, 1766

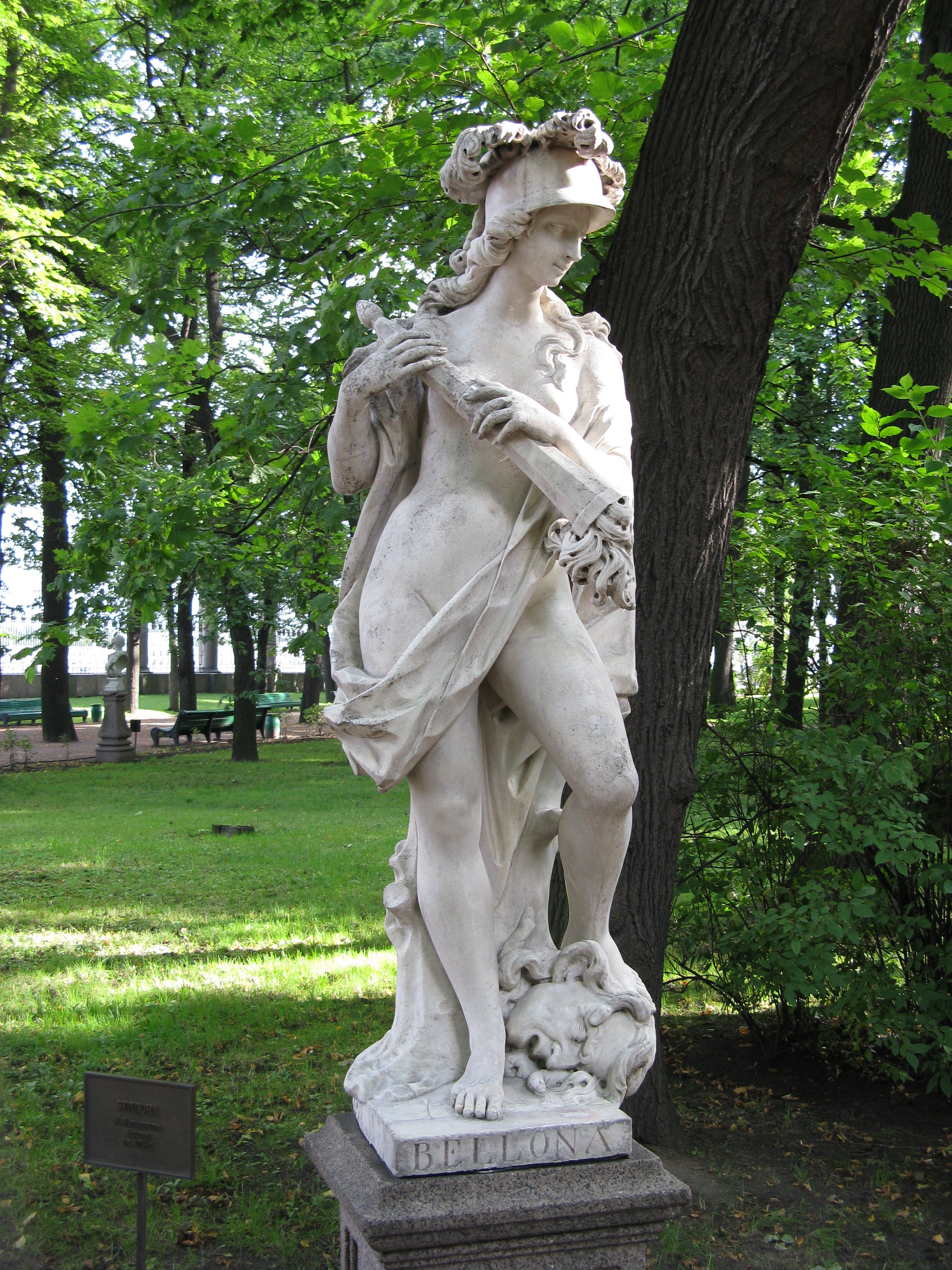
Alvise Tagliapietra's unclothed goddess, c. 1710, Saint Petersburg

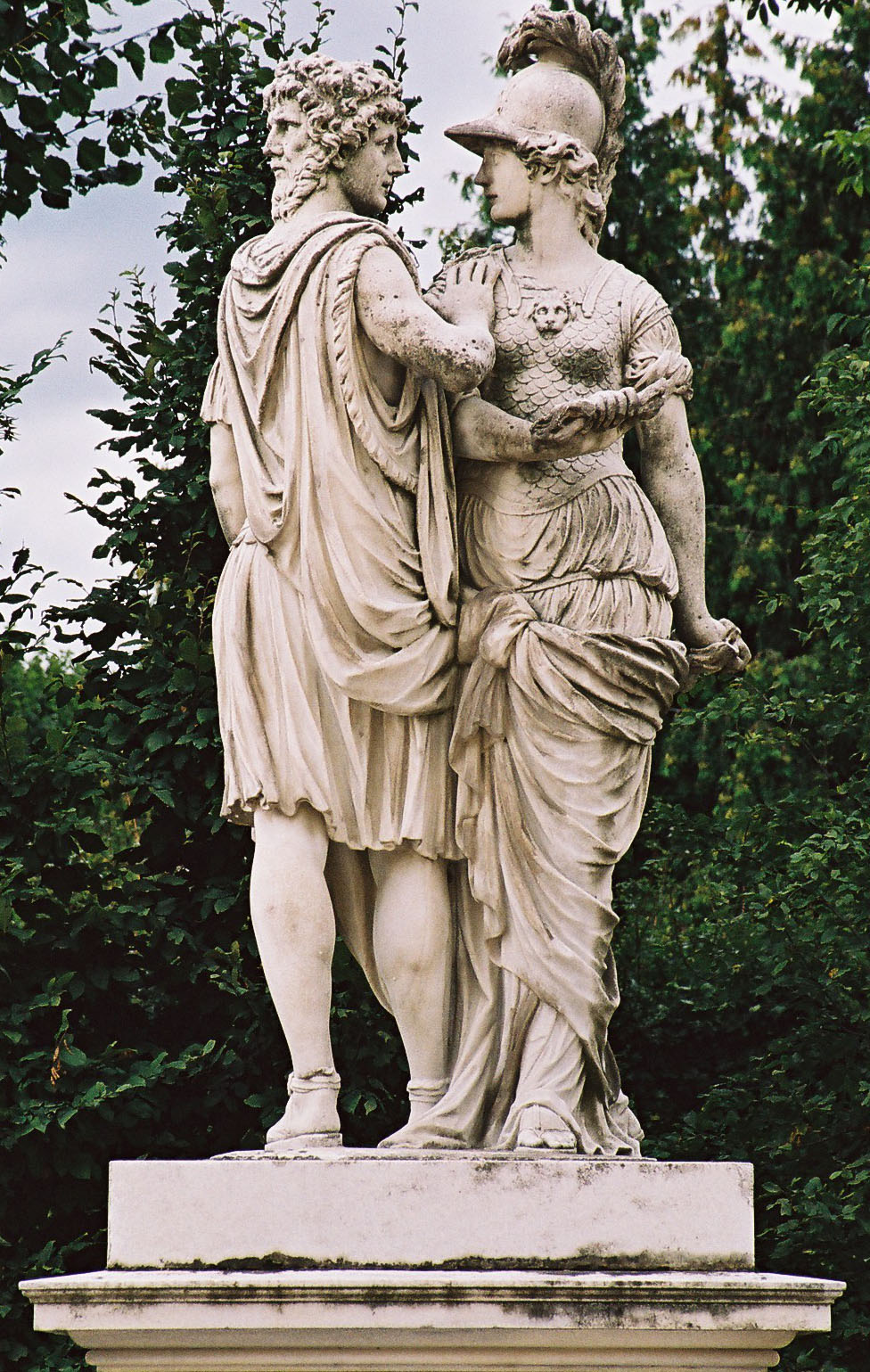
Janus and Bellona by Johann Wilhelm Beyer, 1773–1780, Schönbrunn

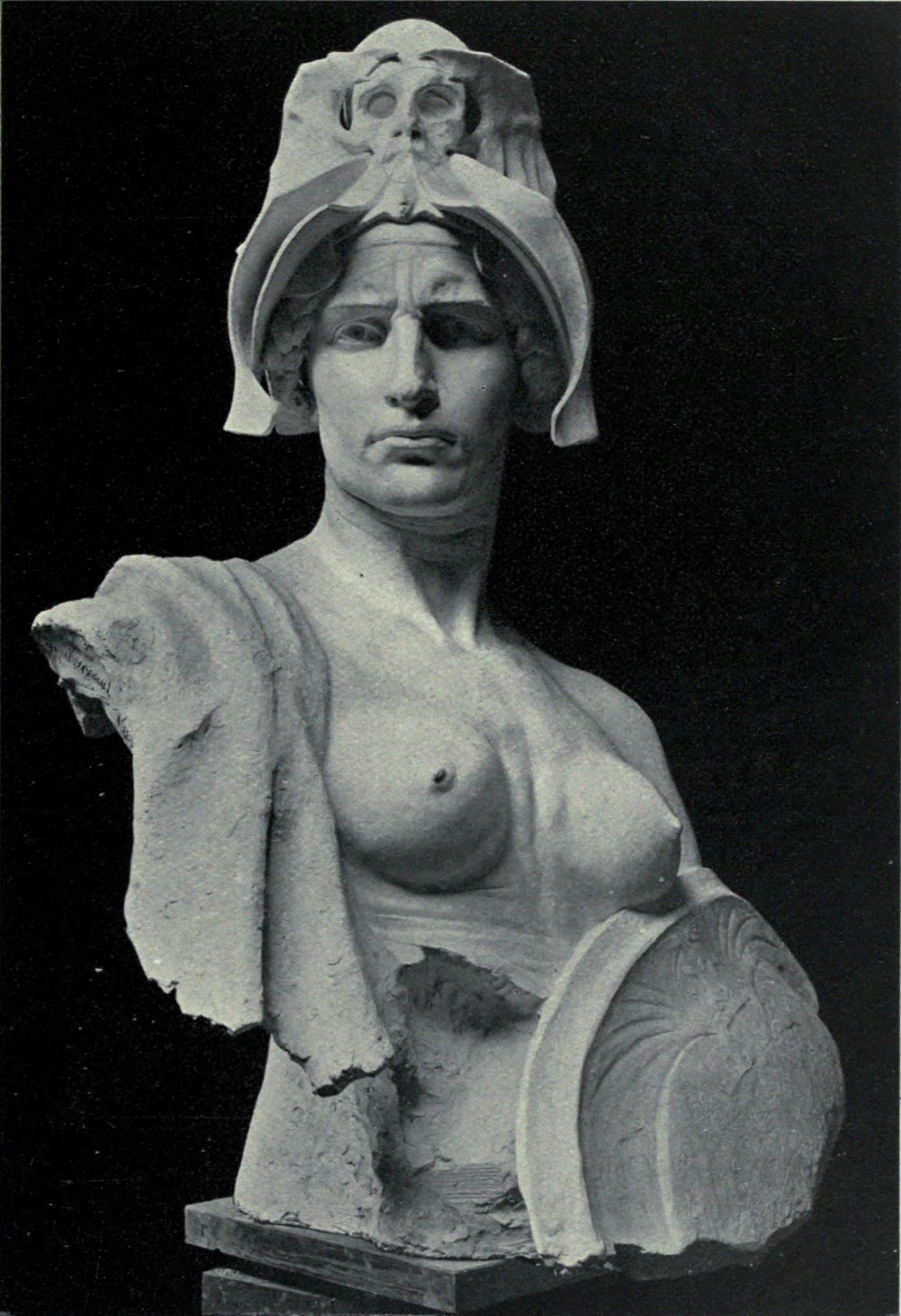
Bertram Mackennal 1916 Gallipoli war memorial, Canberra

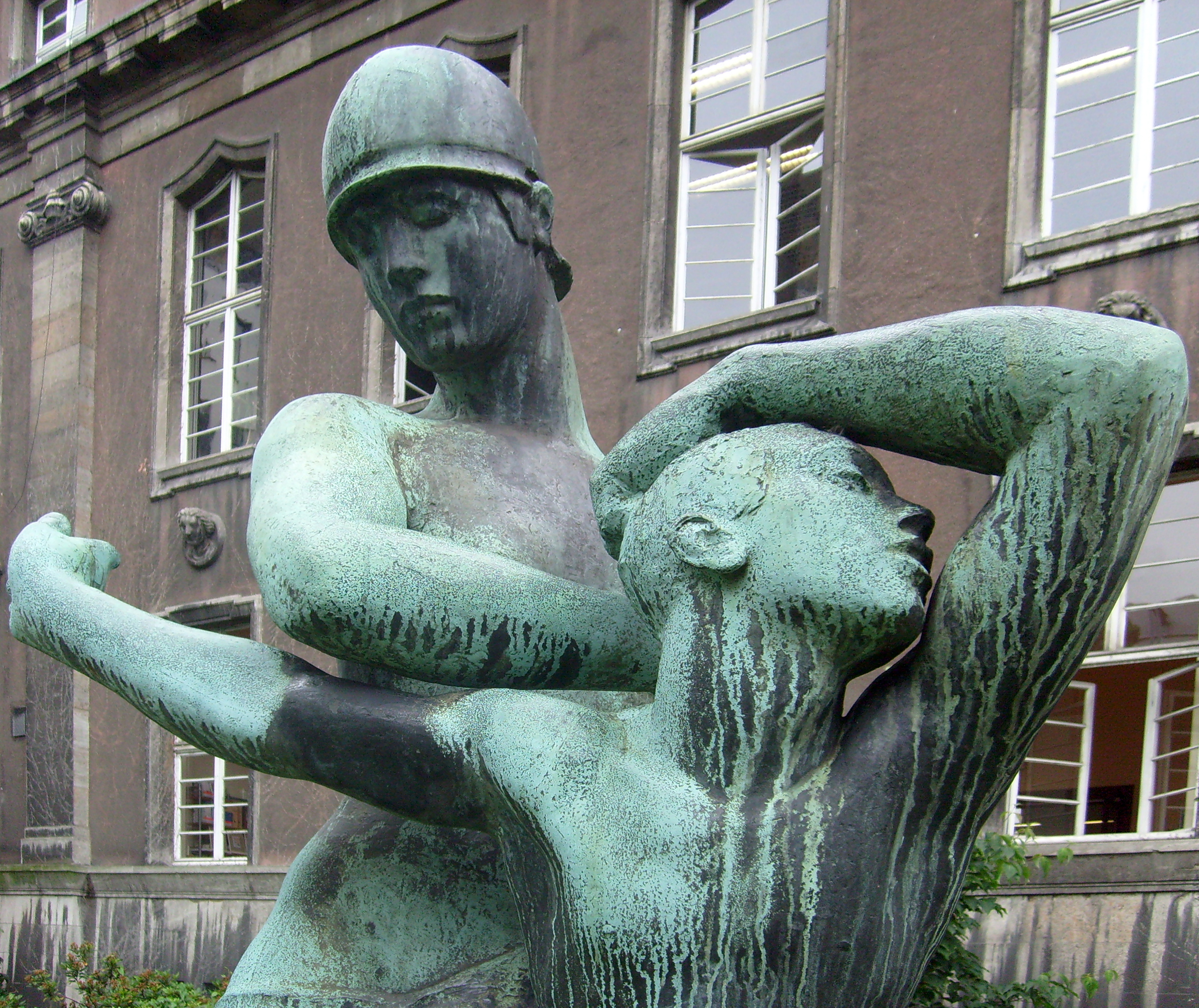
Georg Kolbe's Wuppertal fountain, 1915-1922

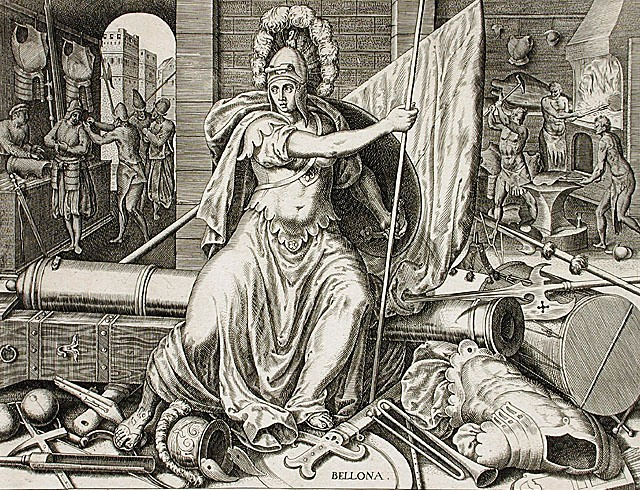
"Bellona inspires the invention of arms", Philip Galle, 1574

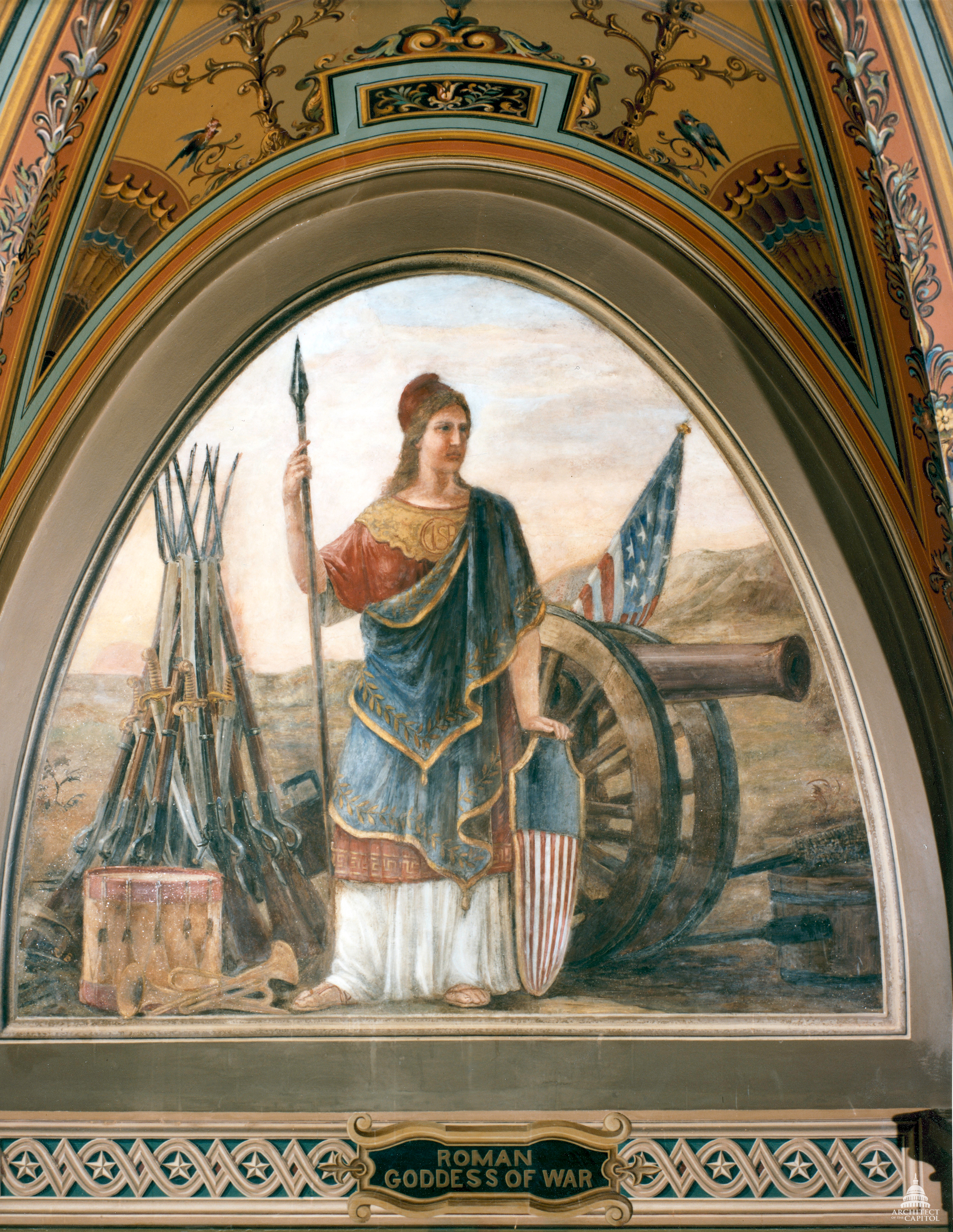
Constantino Brumidi's fresco in the U.S. Capitol, 1855–1860

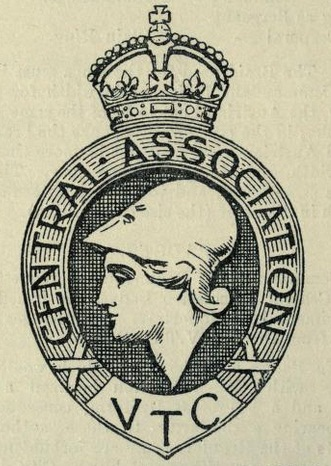
Bellona on the badge of the Volunteer Training Corps in World War I
