= Jan Cosijn =

Flemish sculptor and architect (1646–1708)

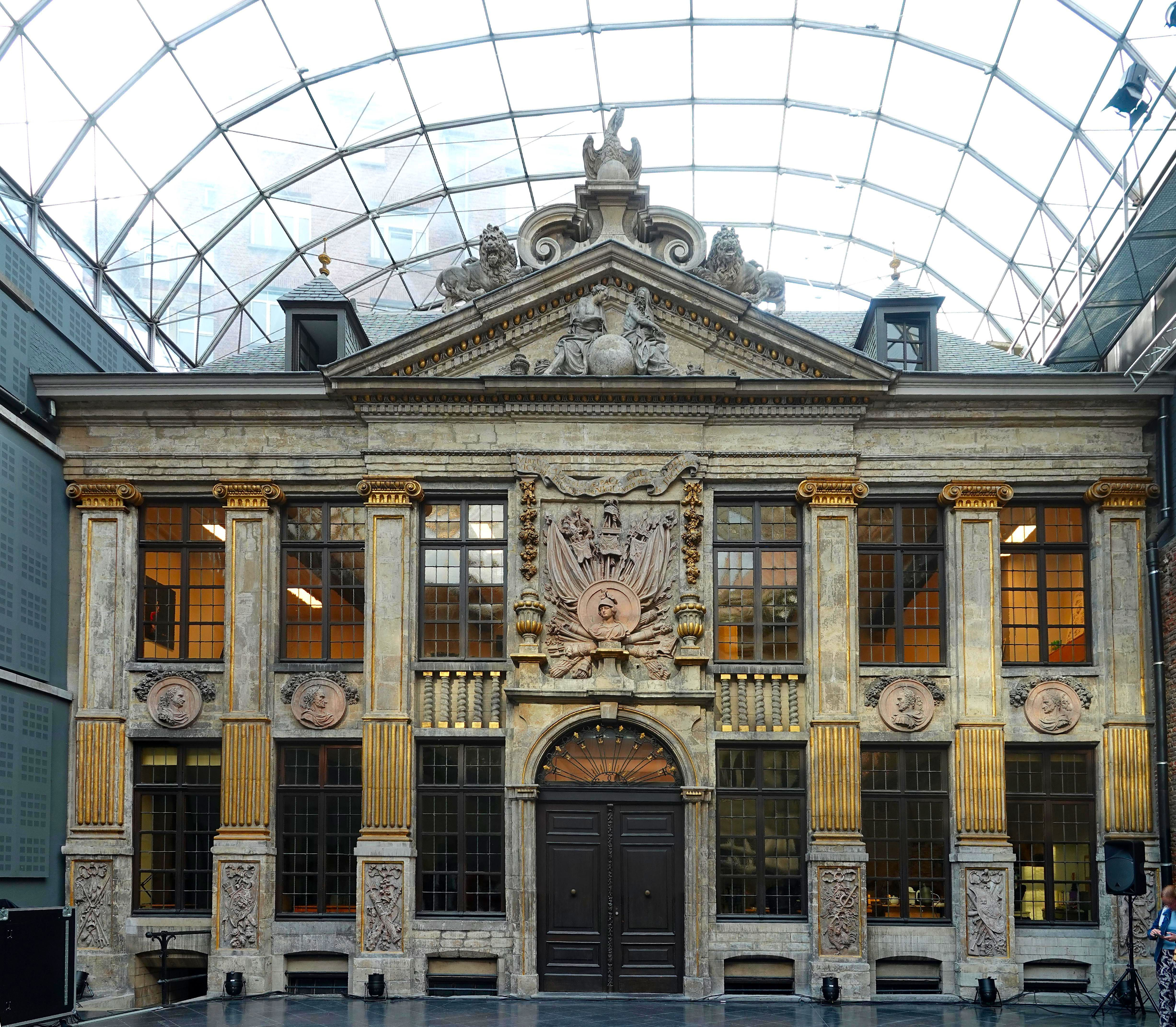
Maison de la Bellone/Bellonahuis, Brussels, 1697

Jan Cosijn, Jan Cosijn or Jan Cosyns (in French language literature referred to as Jean Cosyn or Jean Cosyns; (baptised 4 March 1646 in Brussels – late March 1708 in Brussels) was a Flemish sculptor and architect active in Brussels. He produced statuary for churches as well as architectural designs and decorative elements for the reconstruction of the Grand-Place/Grote Markt (main square) in Brussels. He further carved delicate ivory reliefs.

== Life ==
Very little is known about Cosijn's life. He was the son of Jan Cosijn and Catharina Provoost. He apprenticed with the master sculptor Aert Moerevelt starting from early 1659. He was admitted in 1678 as a master in the Vier Gekroonden, the Brussels guild of masons, sculptors, stonemasons and shale masons.

On 28 May 1689, Jan Cosijn married Willelmijne van Mierlo (Eindhoven, 1667–Brussels, 1703). His wife was a niece of Elisabeth van Mierlo, the wife of the architect Willem de Bruyn (1649–1719), who played an important in the reconstruction of Brussels after the bombardment of 1695.

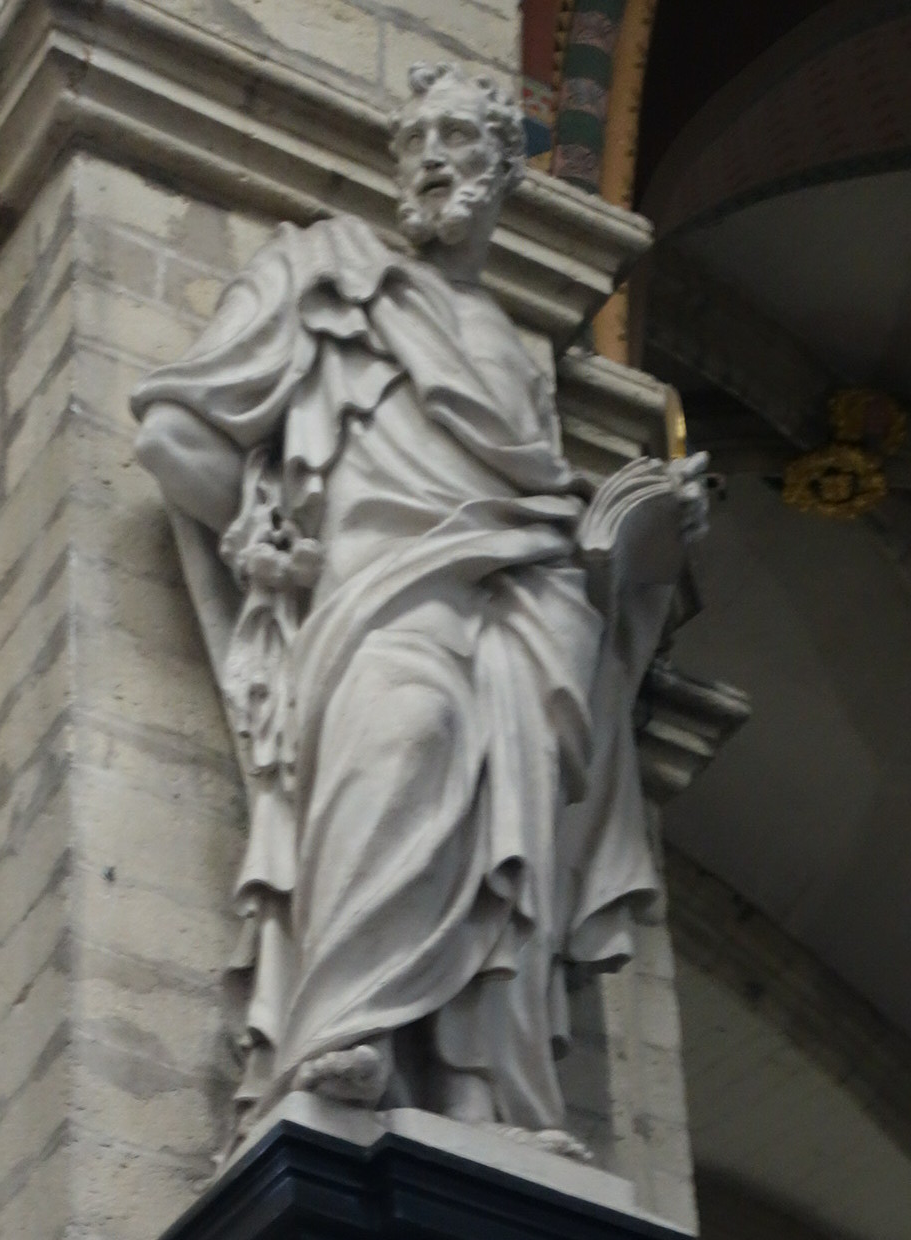
Bartholomew the Apostle, Chapel Church, Brussels.

He died in 1708 and was buried in the Church of St. Gaugericus in Brussels. When this church was demolished during the French period in the history of Belgium (1798–1801), the tomb was transferred to the Church of St. Michael and St. Gudula (now Brussels' cathedral). It bears his initials "IC" and an inscription that has become illegible, surrounded by the symbols of his craft: hammer, chisel, trowel, shop hook and plumb line.

== Work ==
Cosijn produced statuary for churches as well as architectural designs and decorative elements for the reconstruction of the Grand-Place/Grote Markt in Brussels. He further carved delicate ivory reliefs.

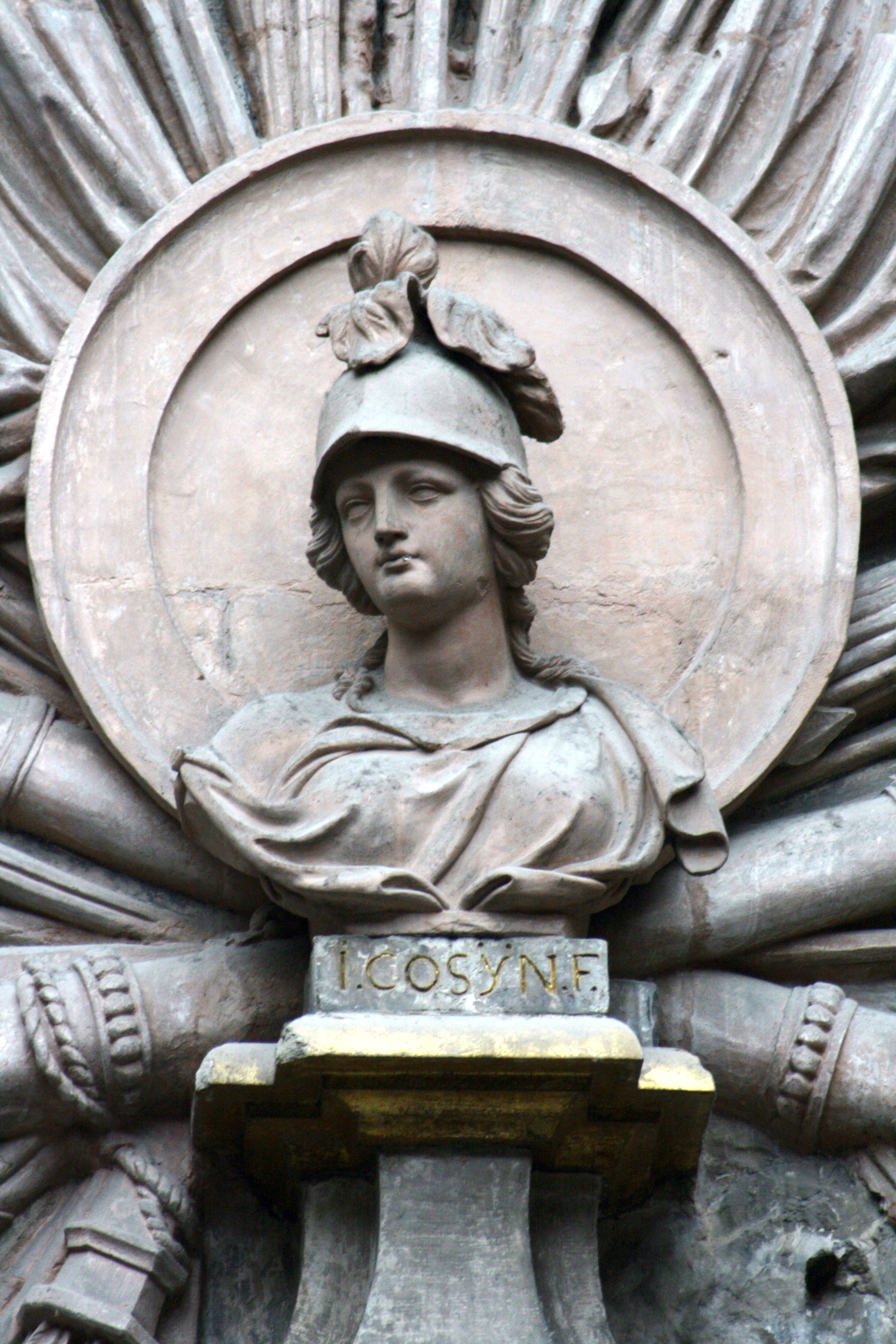
Bust of Bellona on the Maison de la Bellone/Bellonahuis

His religious statuary includes the statue of Bartholomew the Apostle which is located on the original site at the Chapel Church in Brussels. Cosijn was involved in some large-scale projects in churches led by other sculptors. The prominent sculptor and architect from Mechelen Lucas Faydherbe obtained in 1651 a commission to create a monument in the funerary chapel of Duke Lamoral of Thorn and Taxis (in the Church of Our Blessed Lady of the Sablon in Brussels). Although Faydherbe was fired from his commission in 1653, the work on the chapel was continued by court architect Vincent Anthony until its completion in 1676. The result was a richly decorated, octagonal chapel decorated with black marble. Jérôme Duquesnoy the Younger, Gabriel Grupello, Jan van Delen and Mattheus van Beveren worked on the execution of the sculptural project from about 1673 to 1678. Cosijn assisted van Beveren with he sculpting of marble statues for this project, but his exact contribution is not clear.

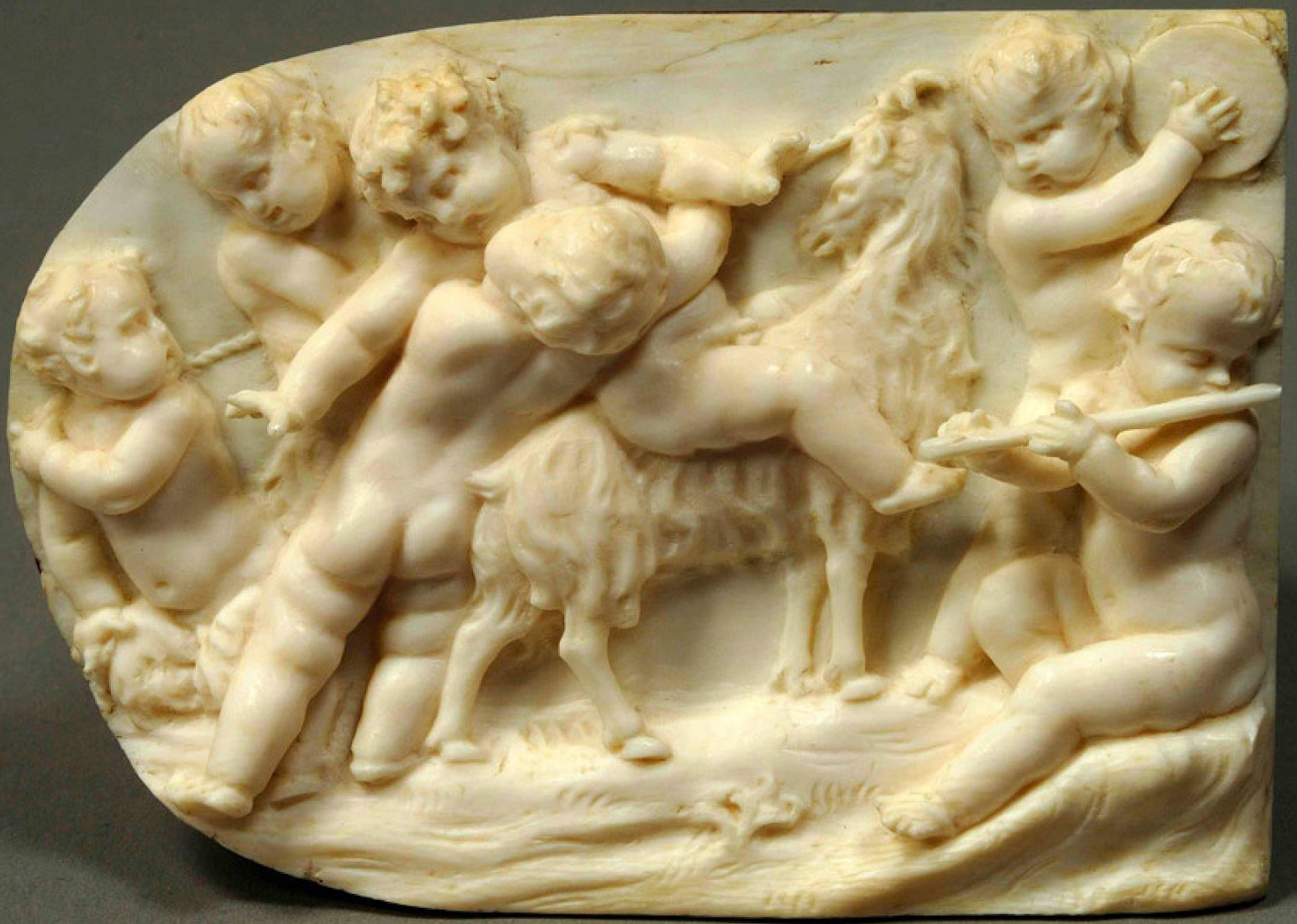
Young Bacchus with a billy goat

Cosijn continued the traditional link between the stonecutters' and sculptors' trades and architecture, which had been common in the 16th century and even before. Other sculptor-architects of his time included Willem de Bruyn in Brussels, Lucas Faydherbe in Mechelen, and Jan Pieter van Baurscheit the Elder in Antwerp. Cosijn was one of the sculptor-architects who contributed to the rebuilding of Brussels after its destruction in the 1695 bombardment. He designed the Maison de la Bellone/Bellonahuis on the Rue de Flandre/Vlaamsesteenweg. He made the facade sculptures and was possibly the project manager for Le Roy d'Espagne/Den Coninck van Spaignien on the Grand-Place. The buildings bear Baroque style decorations on an otherwise classical-looking facade. On the Grand-Place, he was in charge of the summary reconstruction and reparation of the gable top of La Brouette/Den Cruywagen (completed in 1697) and the summary reconstruction of the Bread House in 1695.

Cosijn carved some delicate ivory reliefs of Bacchanals, two of which are now in the collection of the Bavarian National Museum in Munich. The reliefs depict the youth of Bacchus and a Bacchanal with many putti and call to mind the ivory works of the earlier Brussels ivory carver Gerard van Opstal.
