= Nicolaes van Verendael =

Flemish painter (1640–1691)

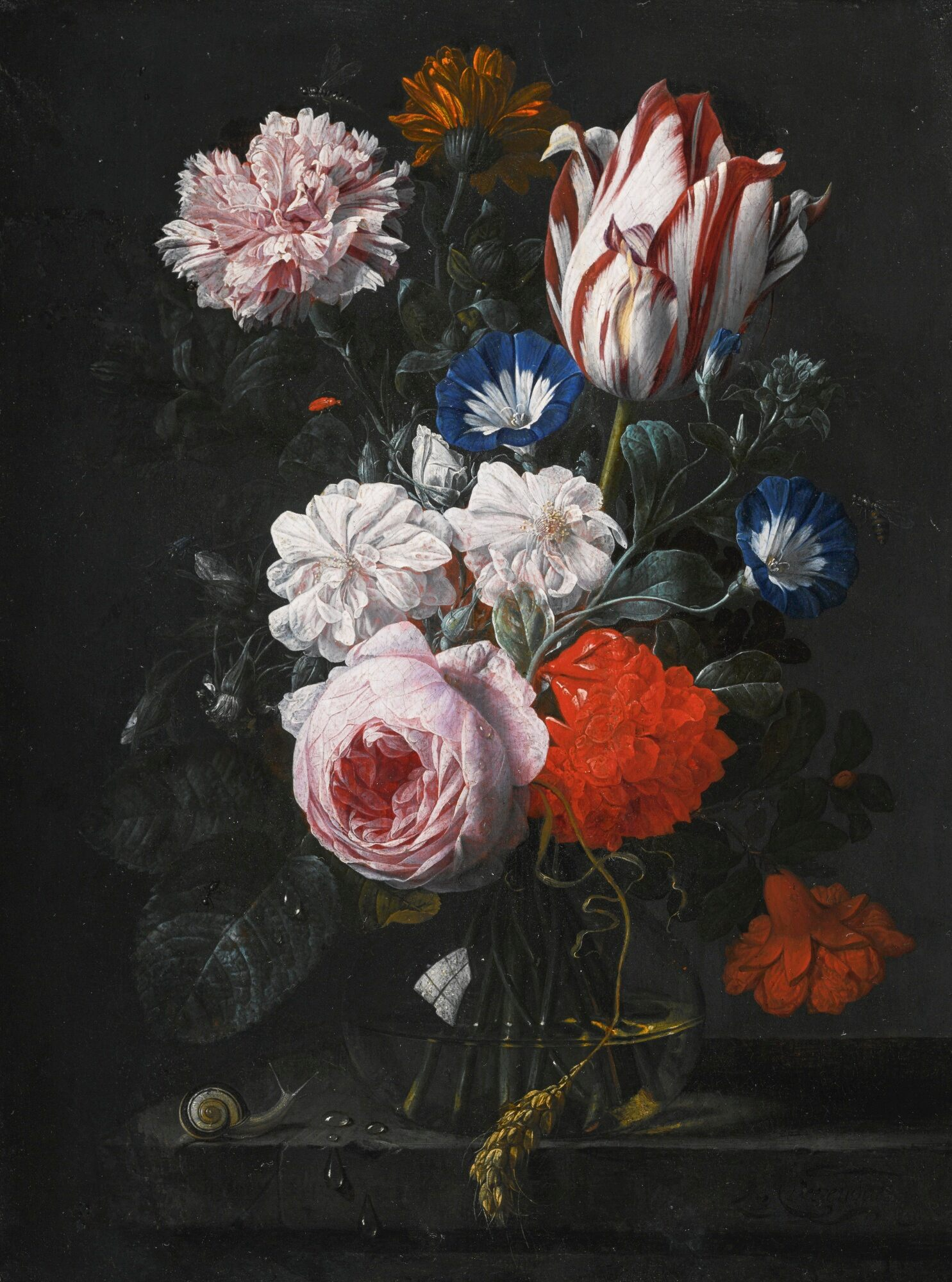
Flowers in a glass vase on a ledge

Nicolaes van Verendael or Nicolaes van Veerendael (1640 in Antwerp – 1691 in Antwerp) was a Flemish painter active in Antwerp who is mainly known for his flower paintings and vanitas still lifes. He was a frequent collaborator of other Antwerp artists to whose compositions he added the still life elements. He also painted a number of singeries, i.e., scenes with monkeys dressed and acting as humans.

== Life ==
Nicolaes van Verendael was baptized in the St. Andrew's Church in Antwerp on 19 February 1640. He trained with his father Willem van Veerendael. He was not formally registered as a pupil at the Antwerp Guild of Saint Luke but was admitted to the Guild as the son of a member in 1657.

He married Catharina van Beveren, the 17-year-old daughter of the prominent Antwerp sculptor Mattheus van Beveren. The couple has 11 children, one of whom was born after the death of the artist. Despite his high reputation among fellow artists, van Verendael was never out of financial trouble as he was a slow worker. As a result, he lived modestly.

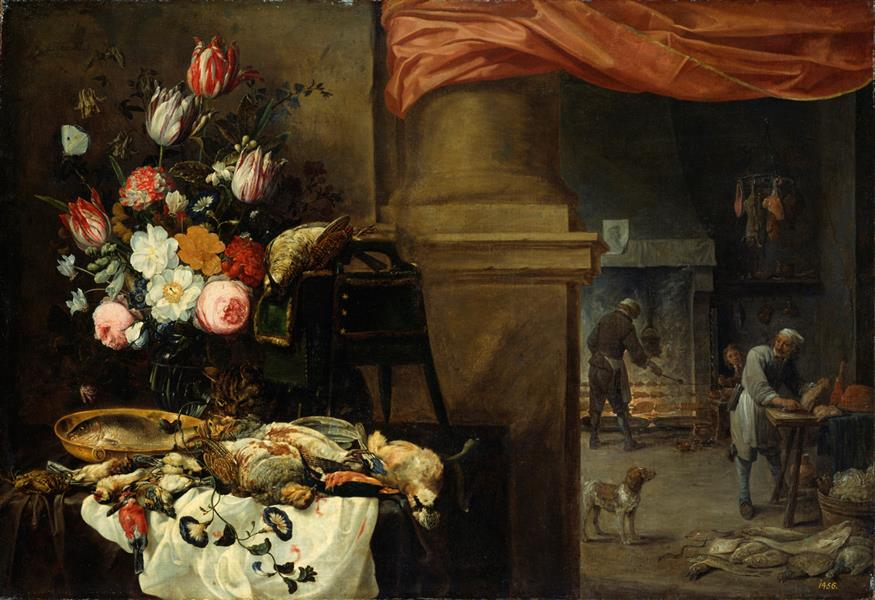
Kitchen still life, collaboration with David Teniers the Younger and Carstian Luyckx

He was the teacher of someone referred to as 'priest Cano' and the flower painter Jean Baptiste Morel.

== Work ==
=== General ===
Van Verendael mainly painted flower pieces, vanitas still lifes and a few allegorical scenes with monkeys. His dated works are from the period between 1659 and 1690. He was highly regarded from an early age. He was in demand as a collaborator working with some of the leading Antwerp painters such as David Teniers the Younger, Gonzales Coques, Erasmus Quellinus II, Jan Boeckhorst, Carstian Luyckx and Jan Davidsz. de Heem. Veerendael is known to have collaborated with other artists on works that expanded on the pure flower still lifes of his particular expertise.

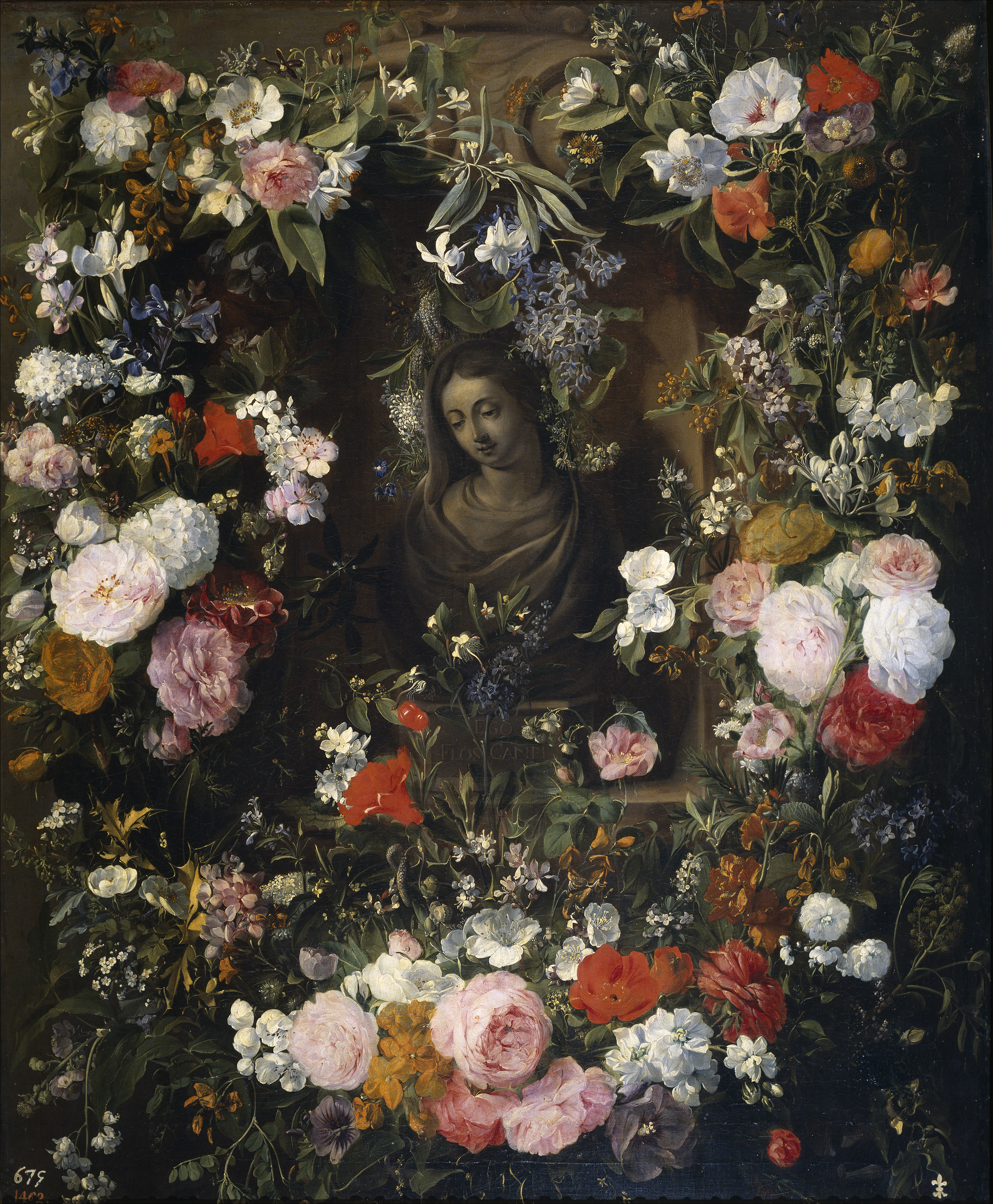
Garland surrounding the Virgin Mary

=== Flower paintings ===
His early work shows the influence of the leading Antwerp flower still life painter Daniel Seghers but he used more and stronger and more contrasting colours. His early flower paintings depicted small, bright, graceful bouquets in tall, narrow vases or cartouches and garlands surrounding a religious figure or scene. These garland paintings had been an invention by Jan Brueghel the Elder dating to the beginning of the 17th century and were usually collaborations between a still life and a figure painter.

An example of a work by van Verendael in this genre is the Garland surrounding the Virgin Mary (Prado, Madrid) a collaboration with an unknown collaborator. The central motif is a sculpture rather than a painting of the Madonna as was more common. The garland of flowers is represented in groups, rather than in a circle, and is thus representative of the later evolution of this genre. The subject of the exaltation of the figure of Mary was a response to Protestant beliefs and is reinforced by the inscription 'ego flos campi' ('I am the flower of the field') at the foot of the bust.

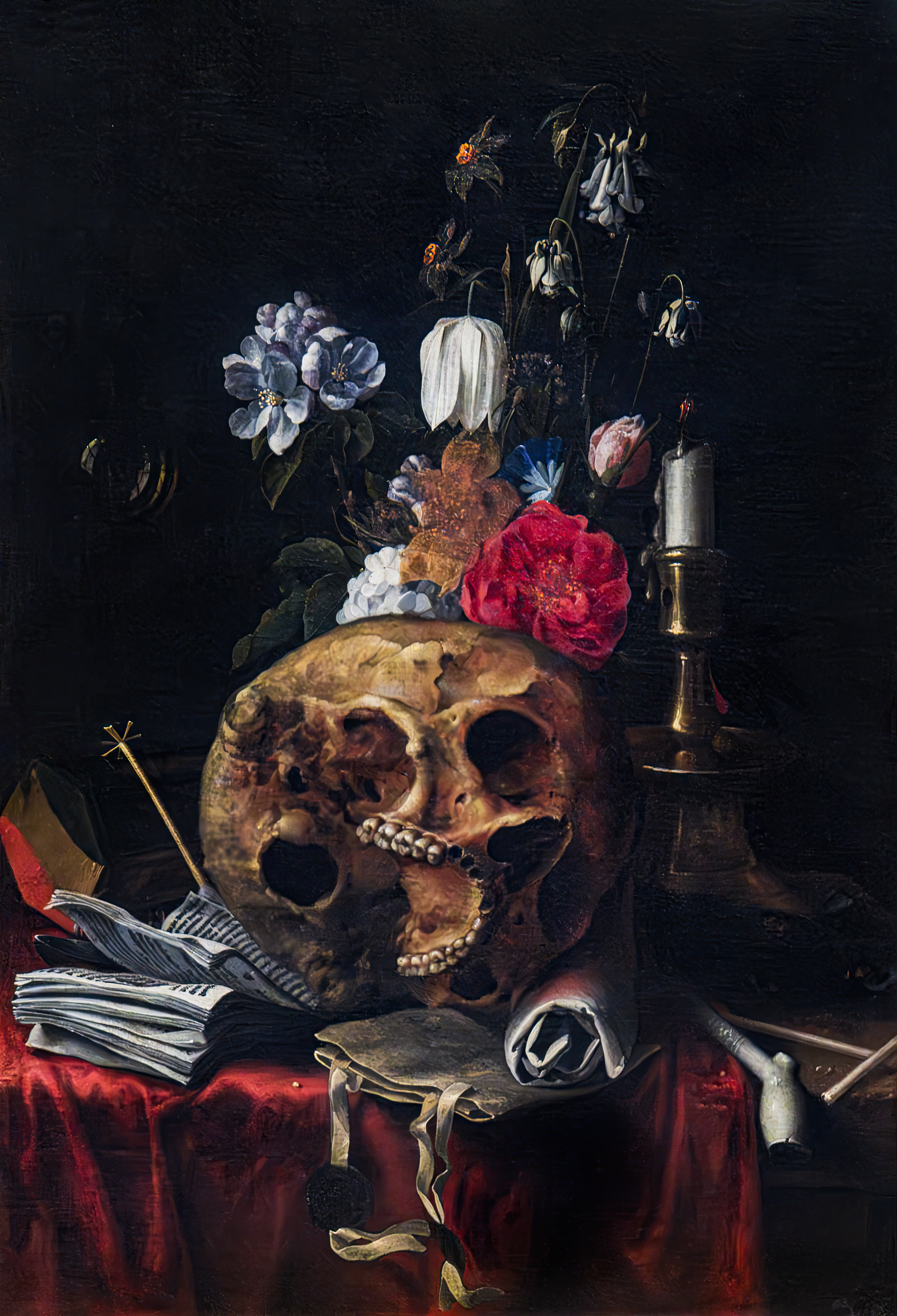
Vanitas still life with a bunch of flowers, a candle, smoking implements and a skull

Later he was influenced by Jan Davidsz. de Heem. Van Veerendael developed towards a brisker brushstroke in his later years and he found a personal style that was a forerunner of Flemish flower painting in the 18th century. Some of his still lifes include insects.

=== Vanitas ===
Veerendael painted a number of still lifes with a vanitas motif. Vanitas still lifes were very popular in the 17th century in Flanders and the Dutch Republic. The objects in these still lifes evoke the transient nature of earthly goods and pursuits, the role of chance in life and its apparent meaninglessness. Stock symbols expressing these ideas include skulls, extinguished candles, empty glasses, wilting flowers, dead animals, smoking utensils, watches, mirrors, books, dice, playing cards, hourglasses and musical instruments, musical scores, various expensive or exclusive objects such as jewellery and rare shells. The term vanitas is derived from the famous line Vanitas, Vanitas. Et omnia Vanitas in the Vulgate translation of the book of Ecclesiastes in the Bible. In the King James Version this line is translated as "Vanity of vanities, all is vanity".

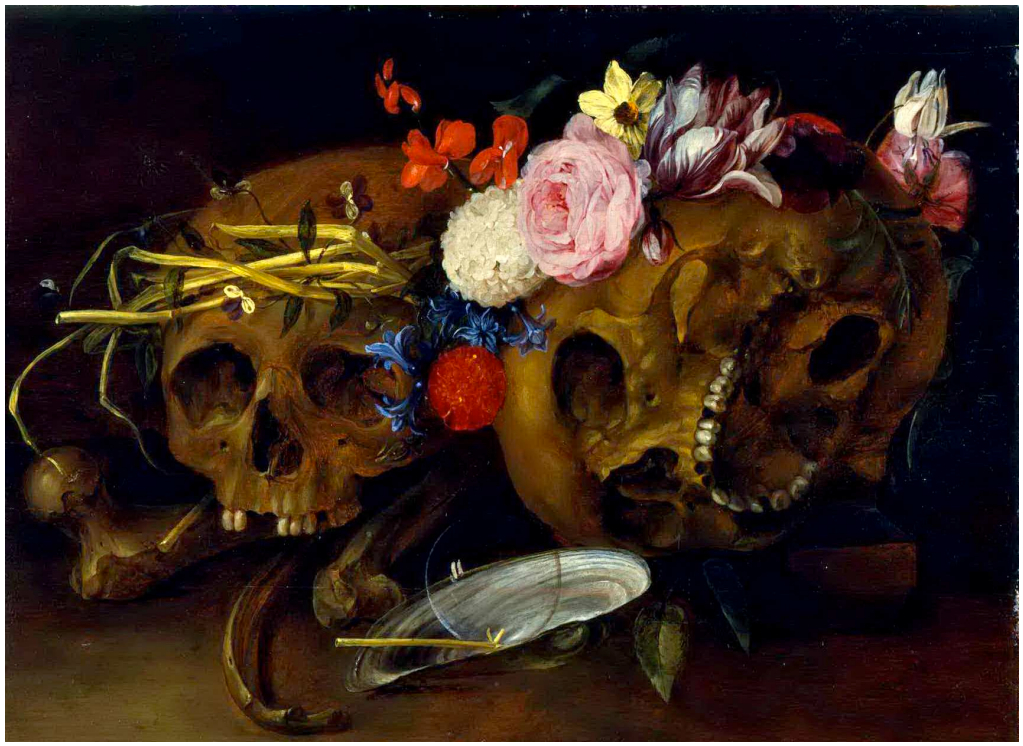
Vanitas wit skulls

These vanitas paintings were informed by a Christian understanding of the world as a temporary place of ephemeral pleasures and torments from which humanity's only hope of escape had been offered by the sacrifice and resurrection of Christ. While most of these symbols reference earthly accomplishments (books, scientific instruments, etc.), pleasures (a pipe), sorrows (symbolised by a peeled lemon), the transience of life and death (skulls, soap bubbles, empty shells) and the role of chance in life (dice and playing cards), some symbols used in these paintings carry a dual meaning: a rose or an oar of grain refers as much to the brevity of life as it is a symbol of the resurrection of Christ and thus eternal life.

An example of a vanitas still life by Veerendael is the Vanitas with skulls (Musée des Beaux-Arts de Caen). The painting shows similarities with another vanitas work called Vanitas still life with a bunch of flowers, a candle, smoking implements and a skull in the Galleria Franchetti at the Ca' d'Oro, Venice dated 1679. The vanitas elements in the latter work have been attributed to the Antwerp painter Hendrick Andriessen. Both paintings contain the token vanitas symbols such as the candle stick, pipe and pipe cleaner, wilted flowers, crumpled up books. The skull too may be one and the same. In the Venice painting vanitas symbols such as the drop of water and the soap bubble are included.

=== Singeries ===
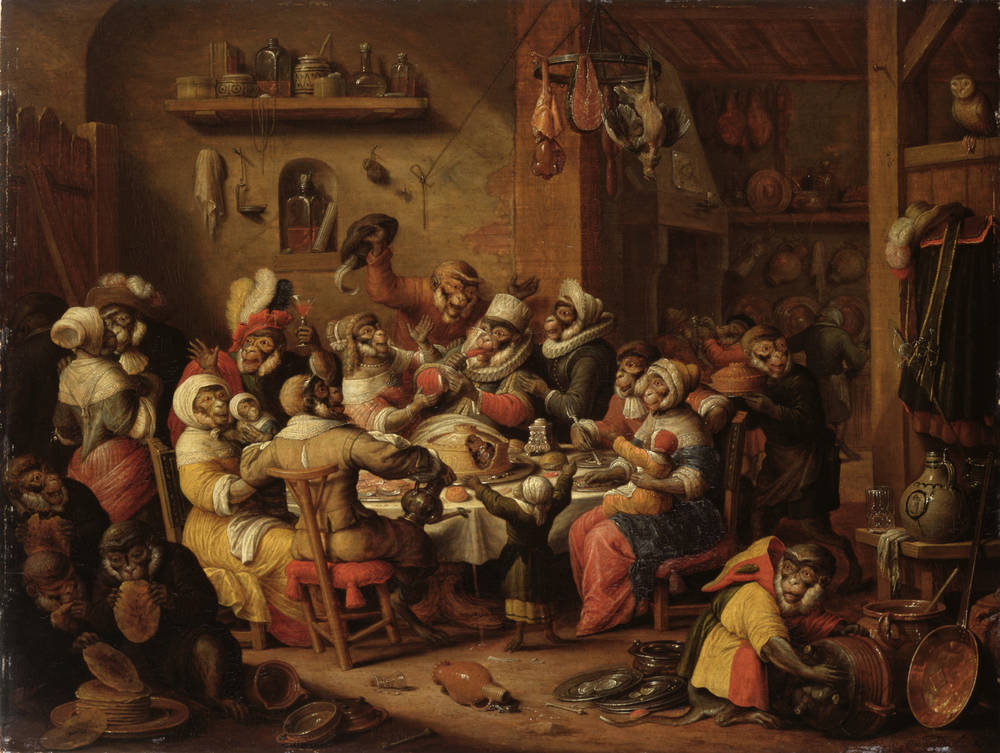
Monkey feast

Nicolaes van Verendael contributed to the spread of the genre of the 'monkey scene', also called 'singerie' (a word, which in French means a 'comical grimace, behaviour or trick'). Comical scenes with monkeys appearing in human attire and a human environment are a pictorial genre that was initiated in Flemish painting in the 16th century and was subsequently further developed in the 17th century. The Flemish engraver Pieter van der Borcht introduced the singerie as an independent theme around 1575 in a series of prints, which are strongly embedded in the artistic tradition of Pieter Bruegel the Elder. These prints were widely disseminated and the theme was then picked up by other Flemish artists in particular by those in Antwerp such as Frans Francken the Younger, Jan Brueghel the Elder and the Younger, Sebastiaen Vrancx and Jan van Kessel the Elder. David Teniers the Younger became the principal practitioner of the genre and developed it further with his younger brother Abraham Teniers.

Later in the 17th century Nicolaes van Verendael started to paint these ‘monkey scenes’ as well. As he had collaborated with David Teniers the Younger in Antwerp, he was familiar with Teniers' work in this genre. An example is the Monkey feast which reprises the theme of 'The King drinks (the Bean King)' with the human roles played by monkeys. Another example is the Merry Company or Singerie (Royal Museums of Fine Arts of Belgium, which depicts monkeys reveling in an inn. A considerable number of paintings and additional drawings of singeries by Veerendael has been identified on the art market and in private collections.
