= Jan Baptist Morel =

Flemish painter (1662–1732)

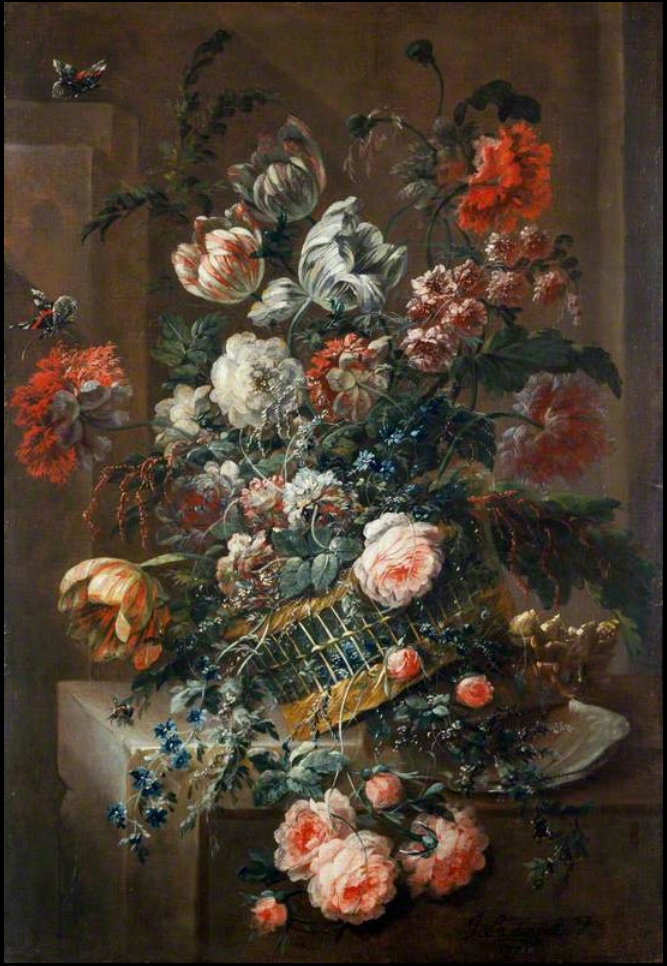
Flower piece with variegated tulips

Jan Baptist Morel or Jean Baptiste Morel (1662 – 1732) was a Flemish still life painter who specialized in flower pieces and garlands. He was a successful artist who worked in Antwerp and Brussels.

== Life ==
Jan Baptist Morel was born in Antwerp where he was baptized on 26 October 1662. He studied c. 1674 under the Antwerp still life painter Nicolaes van Verendael who specialized in flower pieces and garlands.

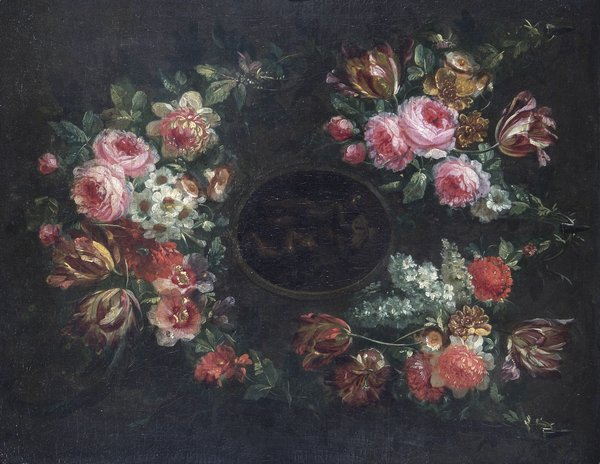
Garland of Flowers Surrounding a Medallion with Putti

He achieved success as a painter in Antwerp. He married Maria Lomboy on 2 February 1689. The couple had six children. After his wife died in 1696, he was called to Brussels. There was at the time a significant demand for his work there to decorate buildings that were being reconstructed after the vile Bombardment of Brussels by the French. He became a member of the Brussels Guild of Saint Luke in 1699. He obtained commissions from Maximilian II Emanuel, Elector of Bavaria, the governor of the Southern Netherlands, whose palaces in Brussels he decorated.

He returned to Antwerp in 1710 as a wealthy man. He married a second time with Anne-Marie van Heymissen, who came from an aristocratic family of Brussels. He had problems with the local Guild of Saint Luke as he refused to join it. The Guild went so far as to seize works that he had exhibited. The paintings were sold by the Guild in 1713.

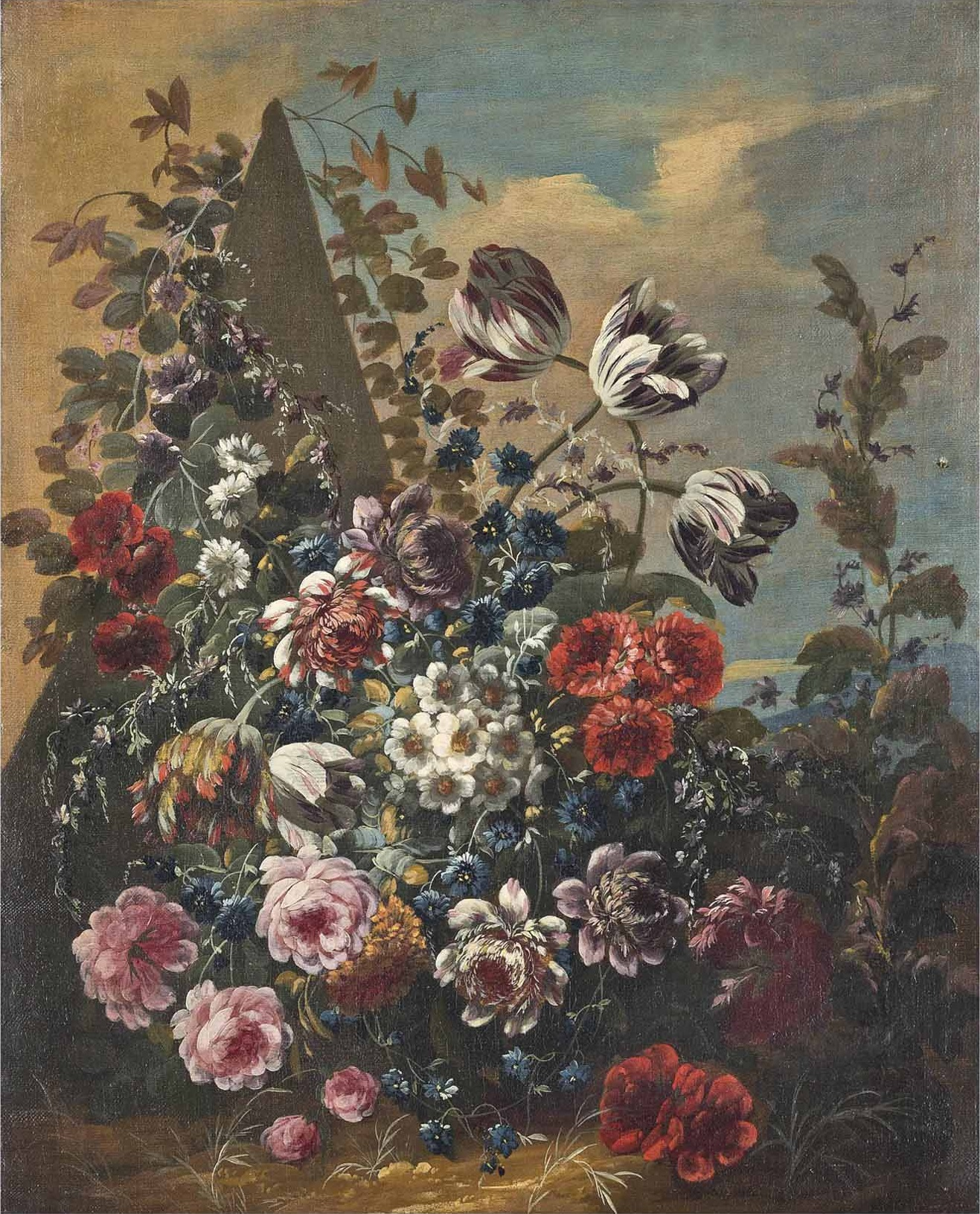
Flowers before a sculpted pyramid

Morel is recorded back to Brussels in 1729 where he had rejoined the local Guild. He is believed to have died in Brussels in 1732.

== Work ==
Like his master Nicolaes van Verendael, Morel was a still-life painter specialized in flower pieces and garlands.

His 'garland paintings' go back on a genre of flower representation invented in early 17th century Antwerp by Jan Brueghel the Elder. The genre was subsequently practised by leading Flemish still life painters, such as Daniel Seghers. Paintings in this genre typically show a flower or, less frequently, fruit garland around a devotional image or portrait. In the later development of the genre, the devotional image was replaced by other subjects such as portraits, mythological subjects and allegorical scenes.

Garland paintings were usually collaborations between a still life and a figure painter. Sometimes the still life painter would paint the garland and only much later another painter would add the figures or image in the centre. The centre in some of the garland paintings that have been preserved were never filled by an image. The cartouche in the center of Morel's garland paintings was usually filled with religious imagery and portraits. The Virgin annunciate in a carved niche with a floral garland and its companion piece Christ as salvator mundi in a carved niche with a floral garland (Auctioned at Sotheby's 29–30 January 2016, New York lot 691) are examples of garland paintings by Morel. These paintings were at an earlier auction by Christie's attributed to Jan Baptist Bosschaert, a contemporary still life painter with whose work Morel's compositions bear a strong similarity. The Mauritshuis in The Hague holds two garland paintings attributed to the artist with respectively a portrait of a man and a woman in the centre.

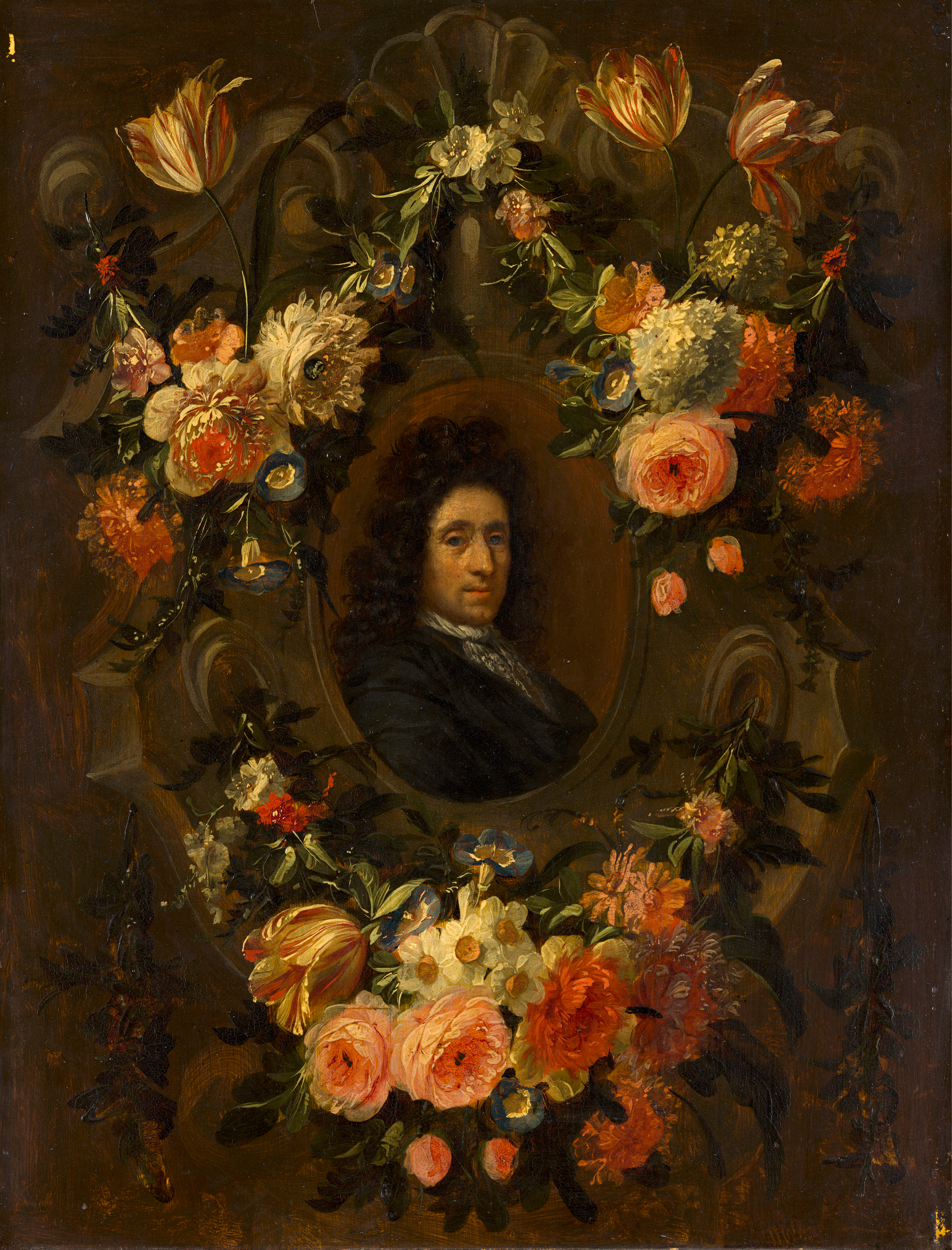
Portrait of a man encircled by a wreath of flowers

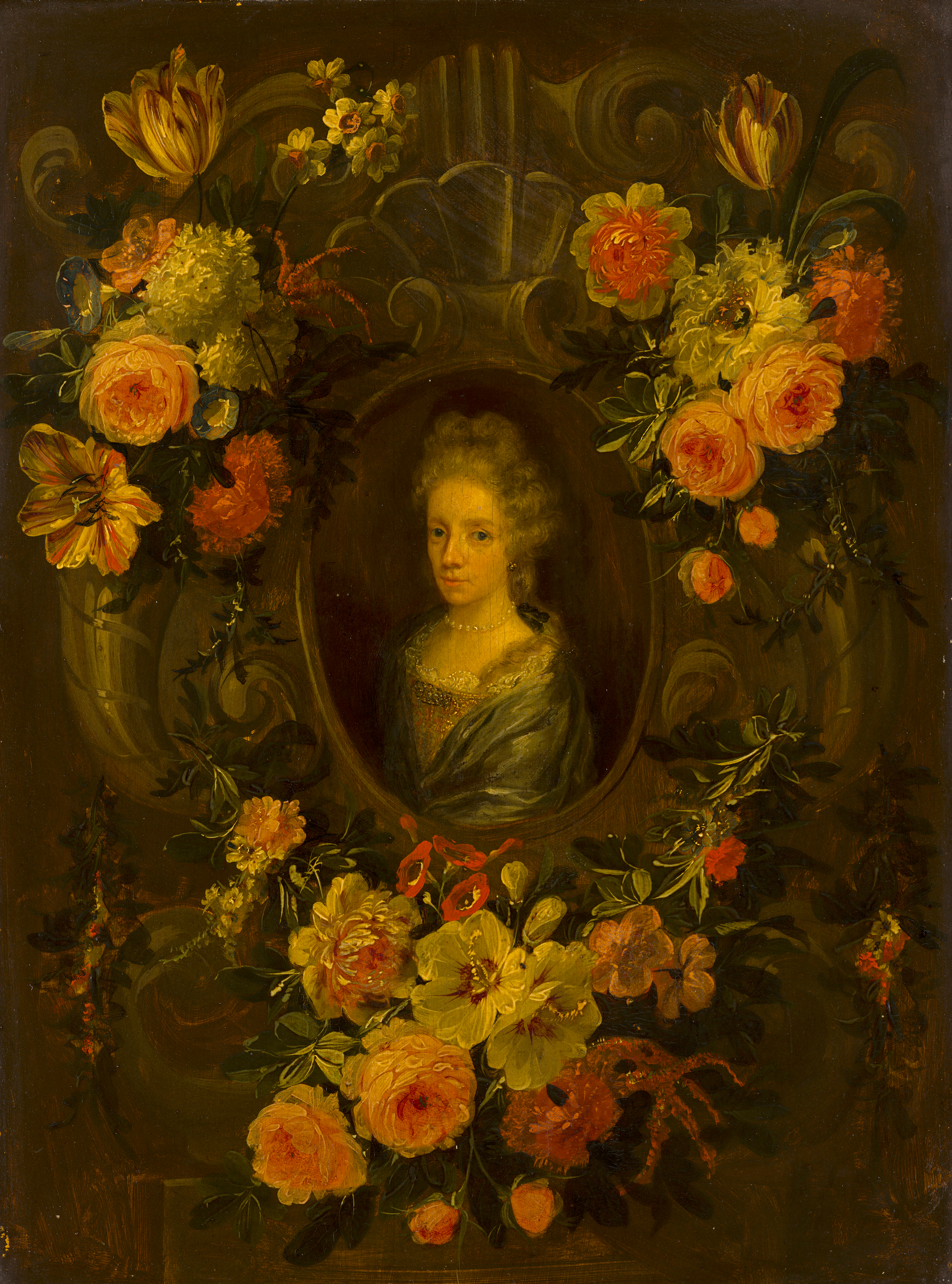
Portrait of a lady encircled by a wreath of flowers
