= Quellinus family =

Quellinus is the surname of a family of Flemish artists, painters and sculptors active in the 17th century in Antwerp. Members of the family include:

- Erasmus Quellinus I, also the Elder, sculptor, (ca. 1584–1639/40)
  - Erasmus Quellinus the Younger, painter, (1607–78)
    - Jan Erasmus Quellinus, painter (1634–1715)
  - Artus Quellinus I, sculptor, (1609–68)
  - Hubertus Quellinus, drawing artist, (1619–87)
- Artus Quellinus II, also the Younger, sculptor, (1625–1700), nephew of Erasmus Quellinus I
  - Artus Quellinus III, sculptor, (1653–1686 in London)
  - Cornelis Quellinus, painter, (1658–1709)
  - Thomas Quellinus, sculptor in Copenhagen, (1661–1709)
