= Jan Erasmus Quellinus =

Flemish painter

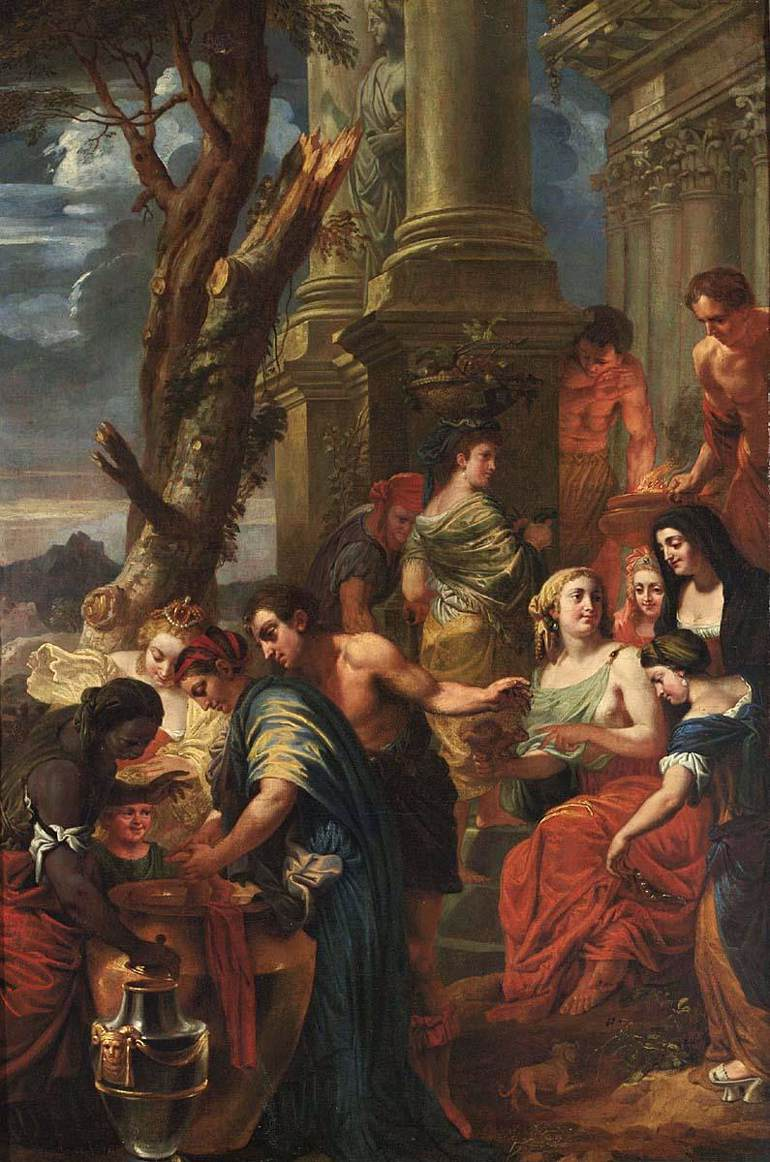
Thetis dips Achilles in a vase with water from the Styx

Jan Erasmus Quellinus (1634 in Antwerp – 11 March 1715 in Mechelen) was a Flemish painter and draughtsman and a member of the famous Quellinus family of artists. He was one of the last prominent representatives of the great Flemish school of history and portrait painting in the 17th century. His work displays the classicizing influences of his father Erasmus Quellinus the Younger and Paolo Veronese. Mainly active in his native Antwerp, he worked for some time in Vienna for the Habsburg court as a court painter to Emperor Leopold I.

== Life ==
Jan Erasmus Quellinus was born into a family of sculptors and painters, which included, amongst others, his grandfather Erasmus Quellinus the Elder, his father Erasmus the Younger, and his uncles Artus Quellinus the Elder and Hubertus Quellinus. He was trained by his father from 1649.

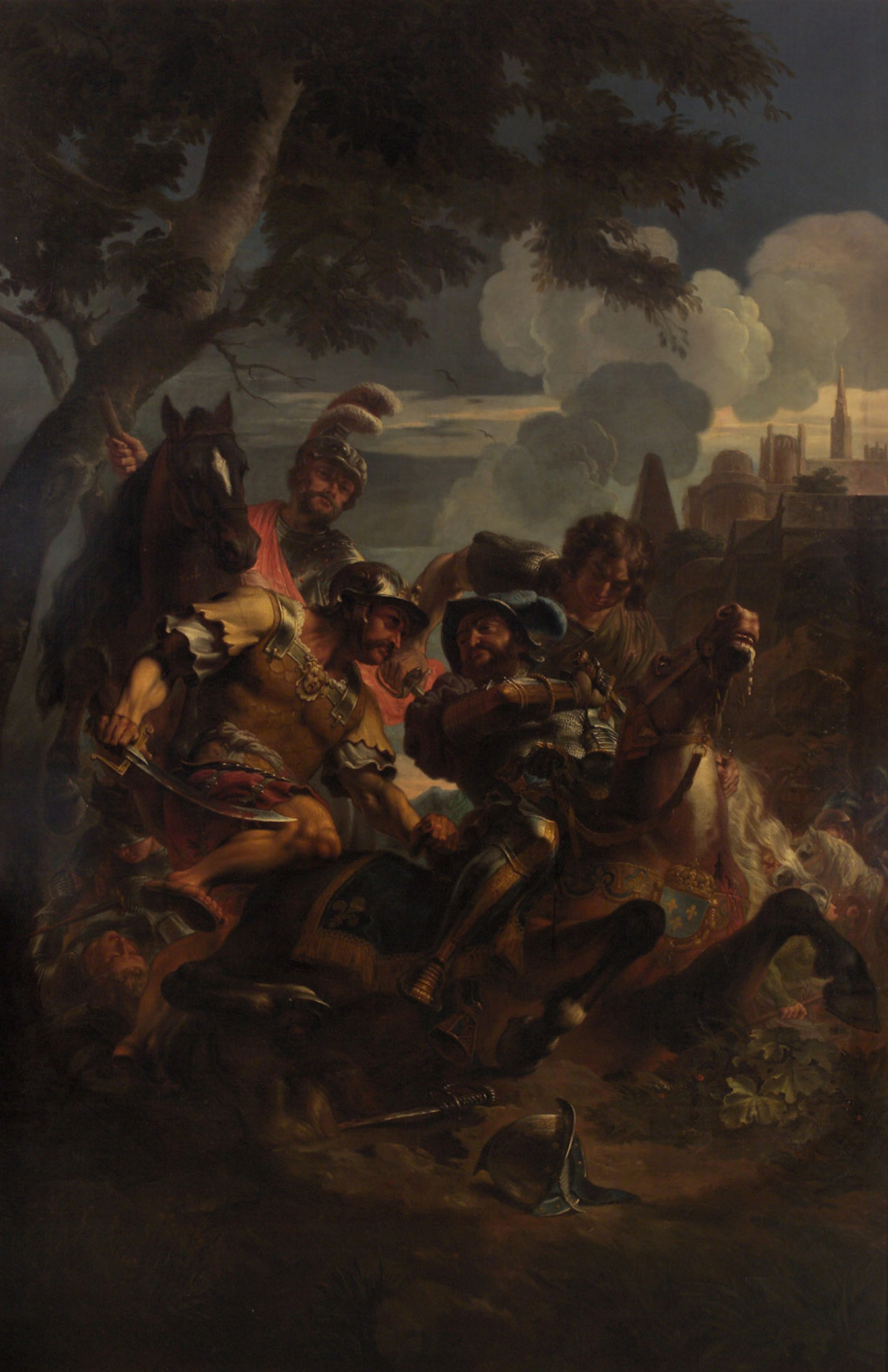
Capture of King Francis I at the Battle of Pavia

Jan Erasmus travelled to Italy where he initially resided in Rome from 1657 to 1659. He became a member of the Bentvueghels, an association of mainly Dutch and Flemish artists working in Rome. It was customary for the Bentvueghels to adopt an appealing nickname, the so-called 'bent name'. Jan Erasmus was given the bent name "Seederboom" (also written as Sederboom), which means 'cedar tree'. He is also reported to have used another nickname: 'Corpus'. Quellinus later moved to Venice where he resided from circa 1660 to 1661. Here he was influenced by the style of Veronese as is shown by his drawings from that time. He also visited Naples. During his stay in Northern Italy he was also introduced to the architecture of Palladio, which informed some of the decorative motifs he used in his later compositions.

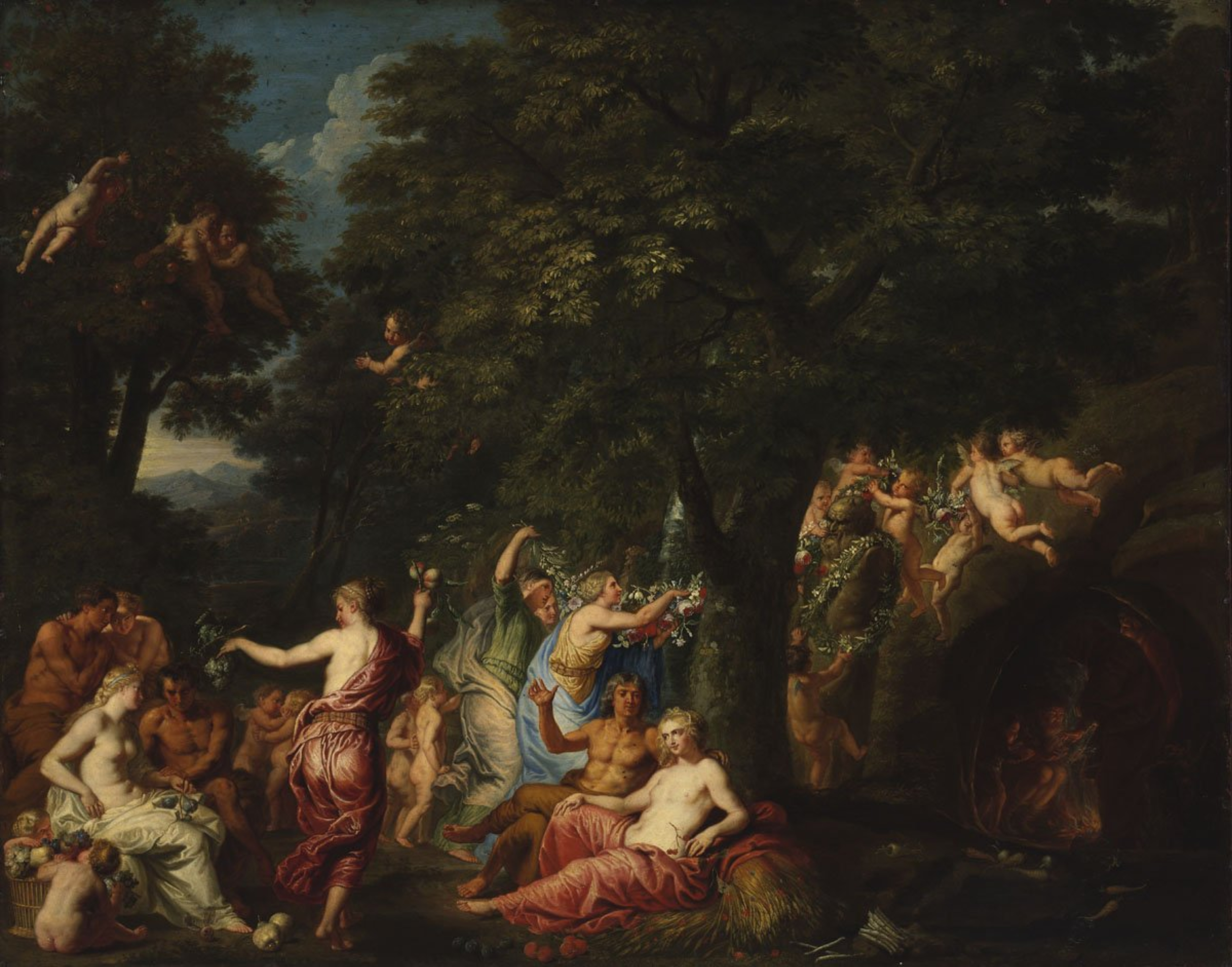
The four seasons

He traveled back via Frankfurt am Main in 1659. According to his own record he met there with Matthäus Merian the Younger. He recounted that he saw some beautiful paintings of Merion, in particular a full-length portrait of the Emperor, possibly Leopold I on horseback. Upon his return to Antwerp in 1660 he joined the Antwerp Guild of Saint Luke as a 'wijnmeester', i.e. the son of a member of the Guild. The next year he married Cornelia Teniers, the daughter of painter David Teniers the Younger. Jan Erasmus Quellinus received many commissions including a large commission for paintings destined for Antwerp's Saint Michael's Abbey.

Around 1680 Quellinus worked in Vienna for the Habsburg court as a court painter to Emperor Leopold I. Among other works, the most important commission he completed was a series of 15 ceiling paintings on events in the life of Charles V, Holy Roman Emperor. Some of these works are now in the Kunsthistorisches Museum in Vienna.

He returned to Antwerp where between the years 1685 and 1712 he worked on many commissions for churches in Antwerp and throughout Flanders. He also had many pupils including Anthoni Schoonjans, Simon de Marets, Jan Carel van Eyck, Guiliam Draeger (1668–69), Christoffel Franciscus Ponsel, Jacobus de Play (1669–1670), Peeter Heymans, Franciscus Carnonckel, Franciscus Cuylen, Hieronymus Galle (1673–74), Joseph van den Kerckhoven, Davit van den Heuvel, Francis Cools, Allowisius de Meyere, Jan-Baptist Hyacint Breydel, Gaspar (or Jasper) de Cantelbeeck (1685–86), Jan François Blondeau and Jacobus Blondeau (1697–98).

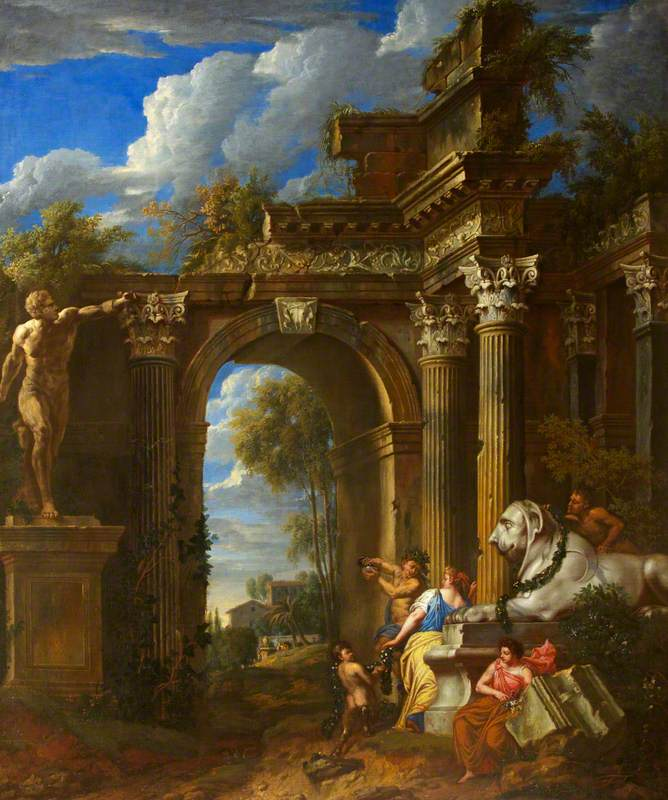
A ruined classical archway, a collaboration with Jan Baptist Huysmans

From 1712 the artist resided and worked in Mechelen where he died on 11 March 1715.

== Work ==
Quellinus was principally a history painter who also painted the occasional portrait. He had an extensive output supported by a large workshop. His style is closely related to that of his father's Classicism. As a result, art historians have difficulty attributing some works to either artist. He developed further on the Classicism of his father linking it with the influence of Paolo Veronese from whom he borrowed grandeur and various dynamic details. Unlike his father he liked to incorporate in his paintings grand architectural elements which were derived from the Palladian buildings he had seen in Northern Italy.

As was common practice at the time, he collaborated with specialist painters in Antwerp such as the landscape painter Jan Baptist Huysmans. Quellinus would typically provide the architectural elements or staffage in these collaborative works.
