= Erasmus Quellinus =

Erasmus Quellinus can refer to:

- Erasmus Quellinus the Elder (1584–1640), Flemish sculptor
- Erasmus Quellinus the Younger (1607–1678), Flemish painter
