= Anthoni Schoonjans =

Flemish Baroque painter (1655–1726)

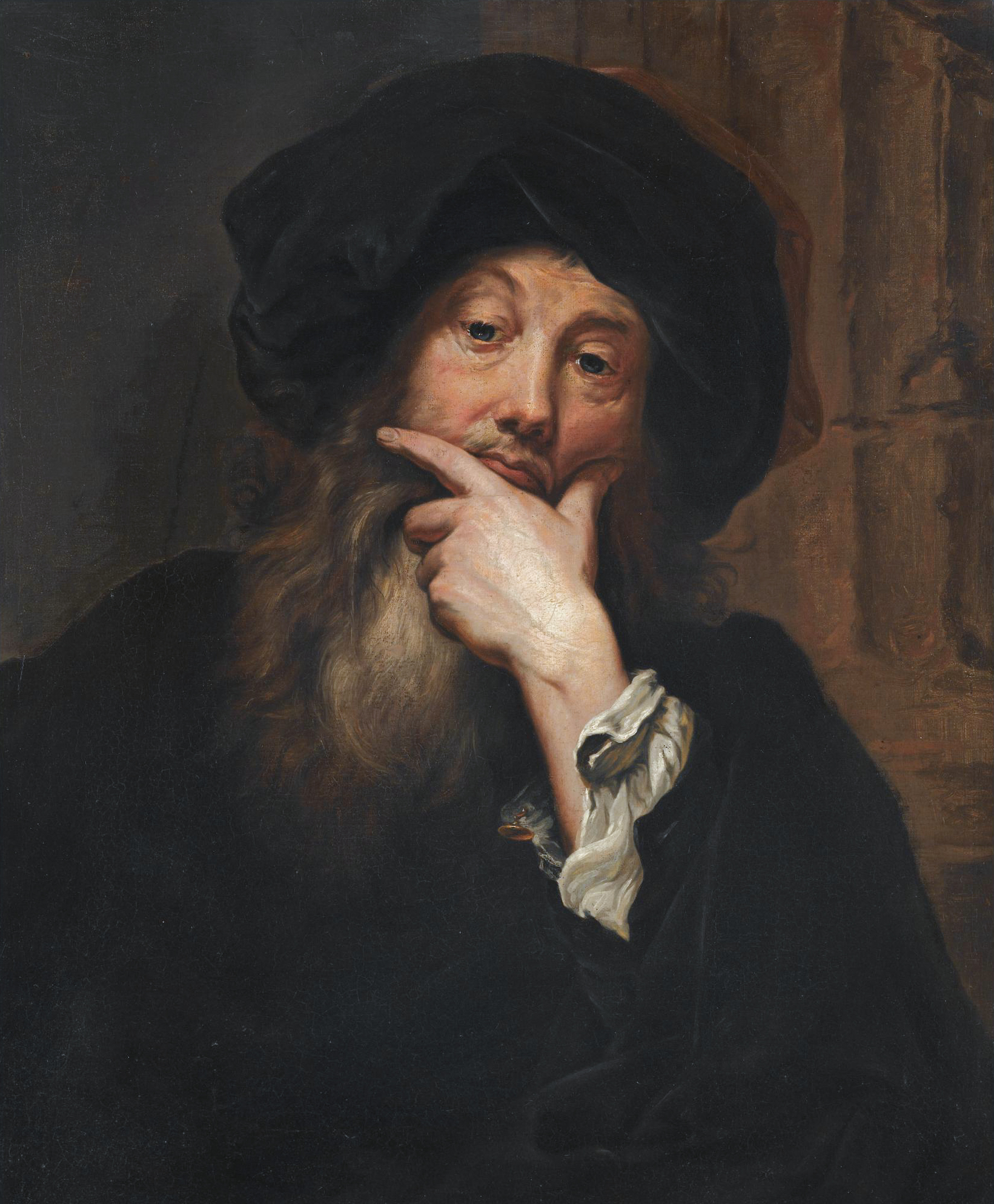
Self-portrait

Anthoni Schoonjans, nicknamed Parhasius (Note: Variant names: Anthoni Schoonjans, Anthonie Schoonjans, Antonie Schoonjans, Antoon Schoonjans, Antoine Schoonans, Antoine Squoniam; nicknames: Parrhasius and Parhasius) (1655 – 13 August 1726) was a Flemish painter known for his portraits as well as his history paintings. After training in Antwerp he had an international career, which saw him work in various countries in Europe including France, Italy, Germany, Austria, The Dutch Republic and Denmark. He was a court painter in Vienna, Copenhagen, Berlin and Düsseldorf.

== Life ==
Schoonjans was born in Ninove as the son of Joannes Schoonians, a wine merchant, and Anna de Gruytere and was baptized on 5 March 1655. He became in the Guild year 1668-1669 in Antwerp an apprentice of Erasmus Quellinus II and that master's son Jan-Erasmus Quellinus. From 1674 to 1677 the artist resided in Reims and he also spent some time in Paris.

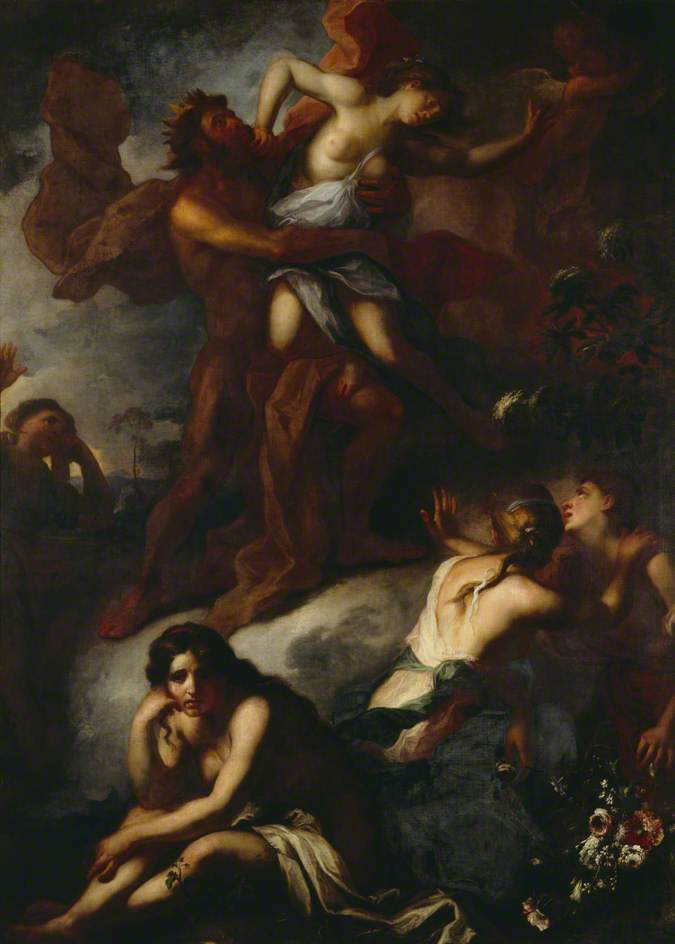
The rape of Proserpine

In 1674 his mother met up with her son Anthoni in Reims. He left France and from 6 January 1675 he resided in Rome, where he familiarised himself with the Italian Baroque. He shared in Rome a residence with the flower painter Carel de Vogelaer in Via Margutta. Like his masters had done before him, he joined in 1674 the Bentvueghels, the society of mainly Flemish and Dutch artists working in Rome, and took the nickname "Parrhasius", likely after the famous painter of the late 5th century BC who worked in Athens. In the year 1686 Antoon Schoonjans was mentioned in Lyon.

By 1693 Schoonjans had moved to Vienna where he became the court painter of Emperor Leopold I in 1695. He was not a member of the court. During this period the Swiss painter Georg Gsell was his pupil. In April 1696 Schoonjans traveled to Frankfurt am Main, Kassel and Hamburg together with the Flemish painter Jan Frans van Douven. On 26 April 1696 he arrived at the final destination of his trip, Copenhagen. Schoonjans had been invited by the Danish court to paint portraits of the royal family. He later returned to Vienna where in 1695 he married the opera singer Maria Regina Schweizer. He painted an altarpiece of the Martyrdom of St Sebastian for the St. Roch's Church and a Visitation of Mary for the St. Stephen's Cathedral in Vienna.

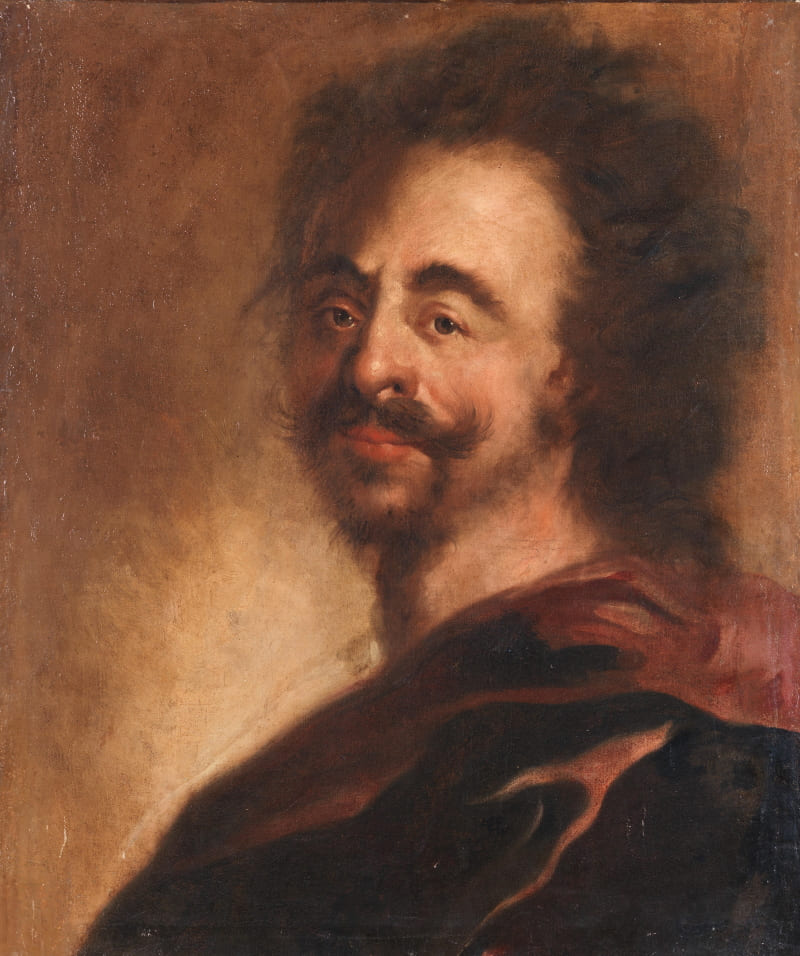
Pasticcio portrait of Emperor Peter the Great of Russia

In 1702 Schoonjans and his wife traveled to Berlin, apparently at the invitation of Queen Sophie Charlotte of Prussia. Reportedly the Austrian emperor was upset about Schoonjans' trip to Berlin. The couple was joined in Berlin by the composer Giovanni Bononcini. During his stay in Berlin, Schoonjans promised Queen Sophie Charlotte to paint the ceiling, rooms and galleries of Charlottenburg Palace, her residence in Berlin. In May 1703 he traveled to The Hague where he stayed with a goldsmith named Spyk whom he knew from his time in Rome. He later left for Amsterdam where he stayed for one year, The Dutch artist biographer Jan van Gool described in his "Nieuw Schouburg" this period of Schoonjans' life in The Dutch Republic and noted with contempt "the unsympathetic character of the painter". Sophie Charlotte asked through various intermediaries to call this "bizarre" man to return to Berlin. The Queen was not only or primarily interested in seeing the painter return but was more keen to welcome back his wife whose singing skills she enjoyed particularly. For the Queen, Schoonjans painted portraits of her son as well as of the composers Giovanni Bononcini and Attilio Ariosti.

In 1704 Schoonjans traveled to England where he painted the stairwell in Montagu House, Bloomsbury and also made a portrait of a certain doctor Peeters. In 1706 Antoon Schoonjans is reported to have given some lessons to the Dutch floral painter Margareta Haverman.

Later Schoonjans moved to Düsseldorf to work at the court of Johann Wilhelm, Elector Palatine who was a known art lover and had invited a great number of Dutch and Flemish painters to his court. He painted the portrait of the monarch and his wife. During this period he made many drawings, many of which are still in the Museum Kunstpalast in Düsseldorf. After the death of Elector Johann Wilhelm in 1716, Schoonjans returned to Vienna. He also worked in Slovenia in the "Križanke Church" together with Johann Michael Rottmayr. In 1726 he is recorded in Brno (Czech Republic) where he painted a "St. John of Nepomuk". He spent his final years in retirement in Perchtoldsdorf.

Schoonjans also owned a house in Vienna where he died on 13 August 1726 of "innerlicher Brand" (internal inflammation).

== Work ==
Anthoni Schoonjans painted history pieces, mythological scenes, religious subjects and portraits.

== Gallery ==
Paintings by Anthoni Schoonjans

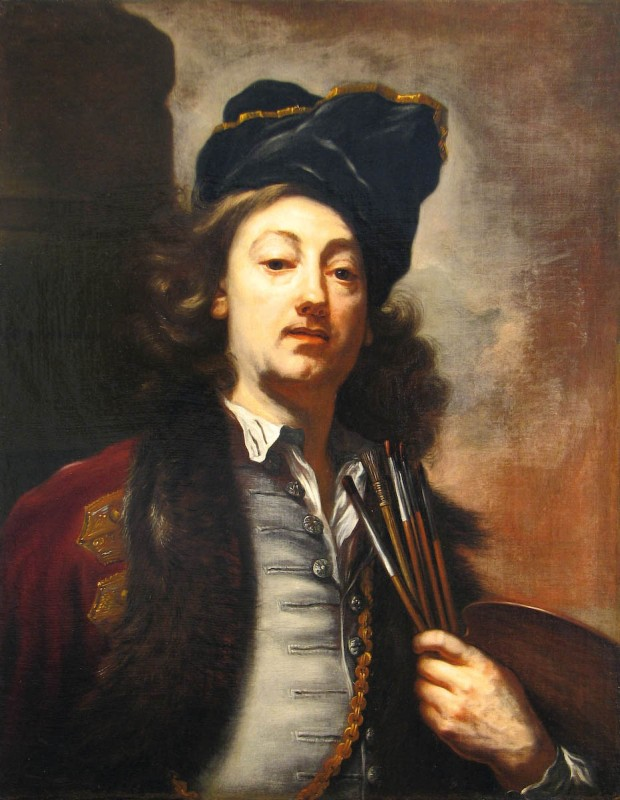
Self-portrait

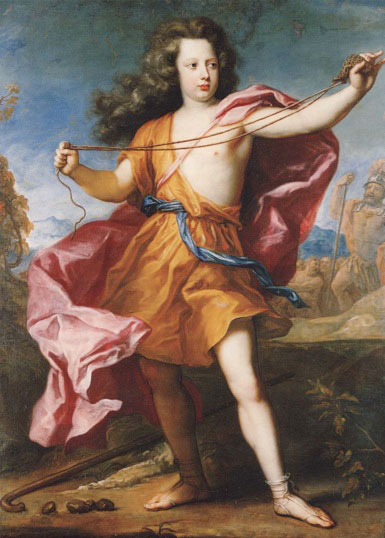
Portrait of crown prince Frederick William as David with a sling

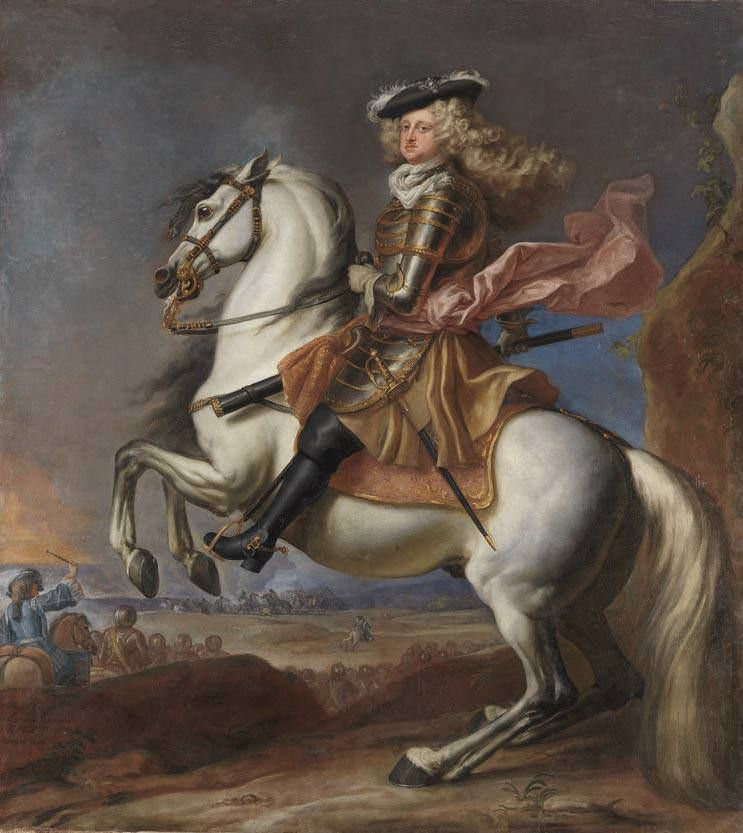
Portrait of Johann Wilhelm, Elector Palatine

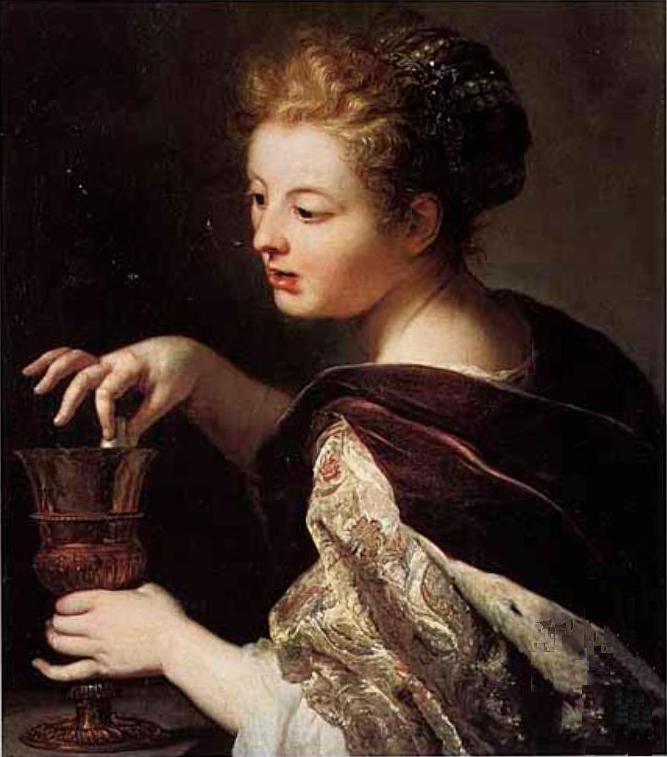
Cleopatra puts a pearl in the wine, 1706

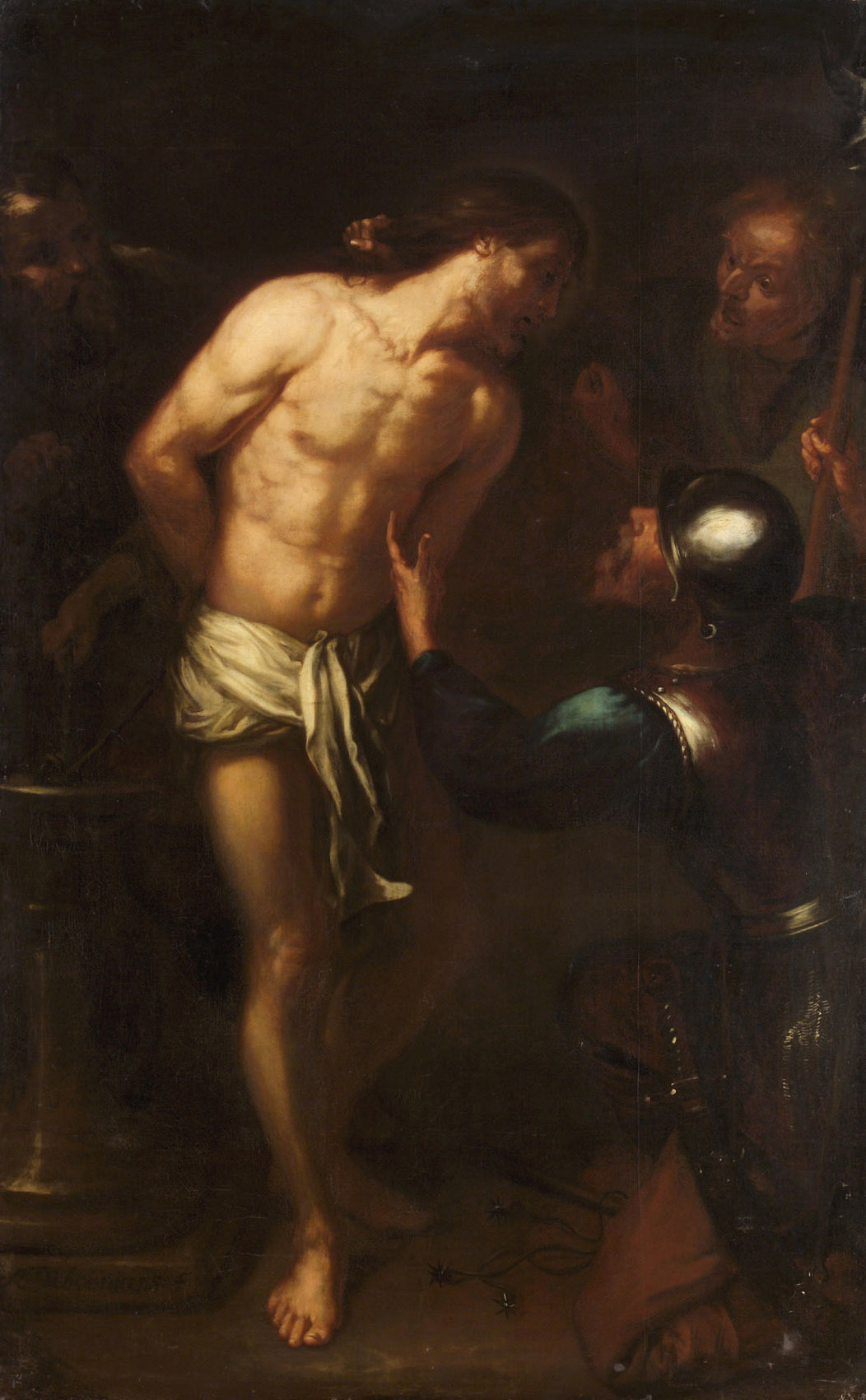
The flagellation of Christ
