= Jan Anton van der Baren =

Flemish painter, draughtsman, priest and museum curator

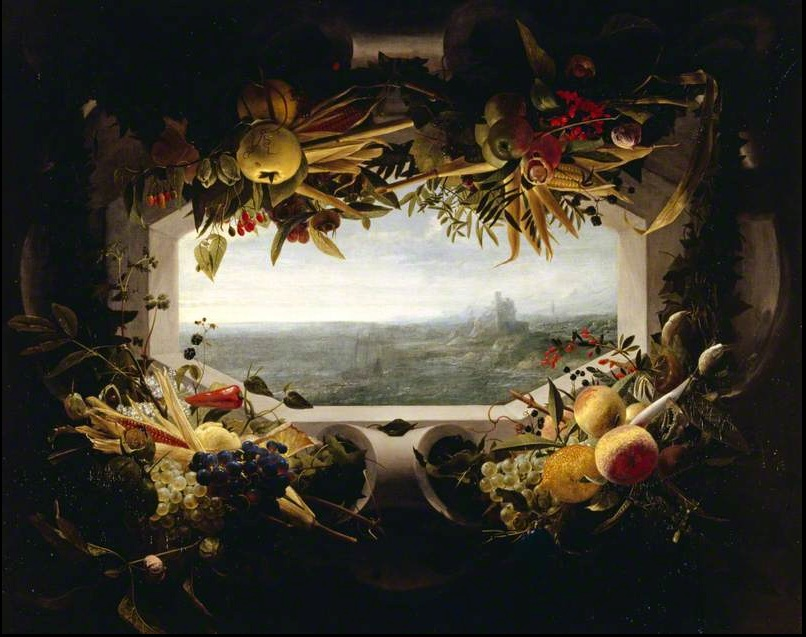
Seascape within a garland of fruit

Jan Anton van der Baren (1615 – 30 or 31 December 1686) was a Flemish painter, draughtsman, priest and museum curator active in Brussels and Vienna. He specialised in still lifes of flowers and vegetables, some of which include an architectural background. He held the offices of court chaplain and director of the picture gallery of Archduke Leopold Wilhelm and Emperor Leopold I.

== Life ==
Jan Anton van der Baren was likely born in Brussels. He became court chaplain to Archduke Leopold Wilhelm, the Governor of the Spanish Netherlands, who resided in Brussels. He accompanied the Archduke on his return to Vienna in 1656 and remained there until his death.

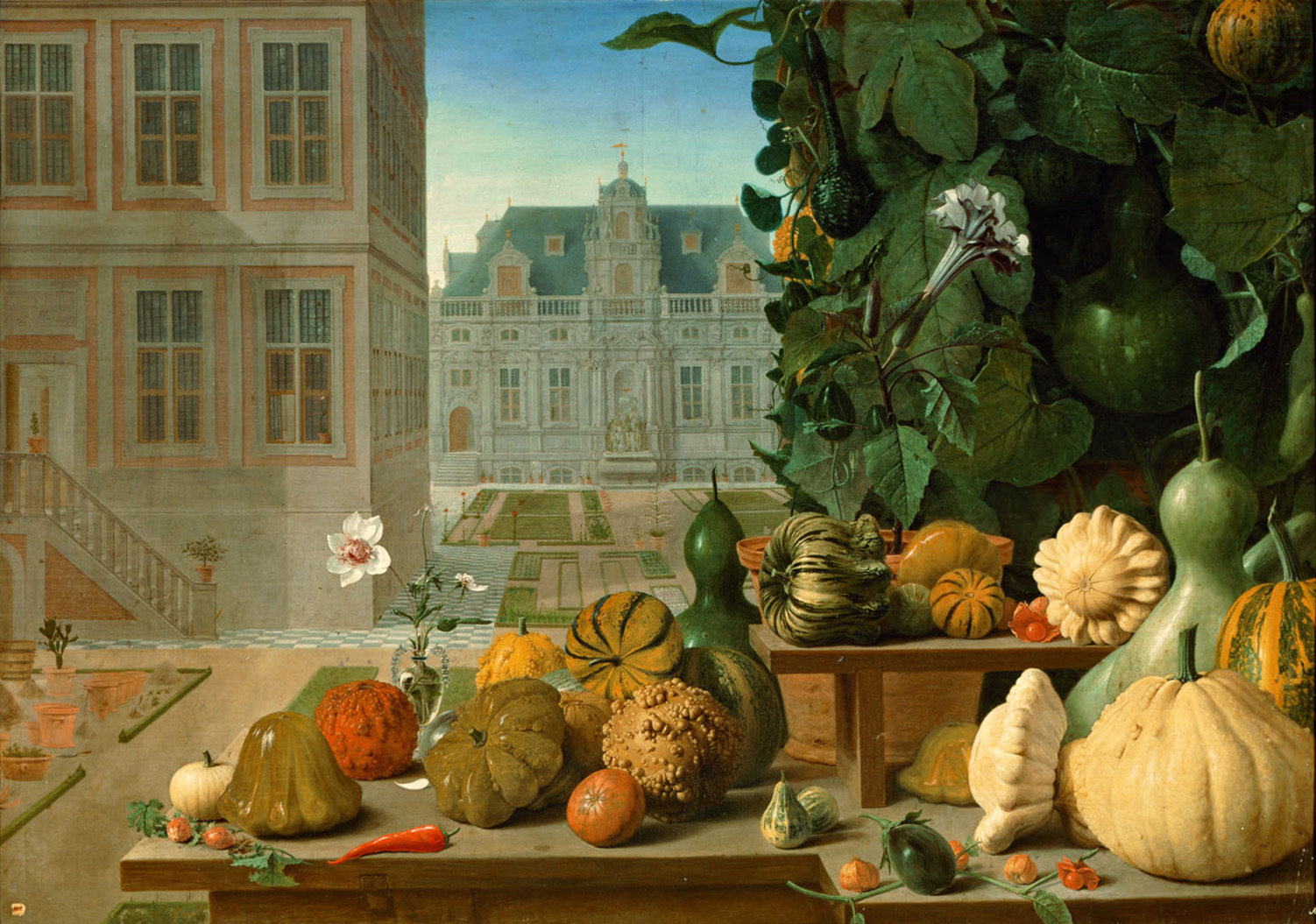
Still life with pumpkins

In Vienna he became director of the picture gallery of the Archduke, one of the most extensive art collections in Europe at the time. Van der Baren compiled an inventory of the collection in 1659, although he probably did not himself draft the German language inventory that he signed together with three other members of the Archduke’s court administration. David Teniers the Younger, who was the director of the Archduke’s collection while it was still in Brussels, painted the famous Archduke Leopold Willem in his gallery at Brussels. The painting includes a portrait of van der Baren (he is the third man from the right).

After the Archduke’s death in 1662, van der Baren continued to hold the offices of court chaplain and director of the picture gallery under Emperor Leopold I.

He died on 30 or 31 December 1686 in Vienna.

== Work ==
=== General ===
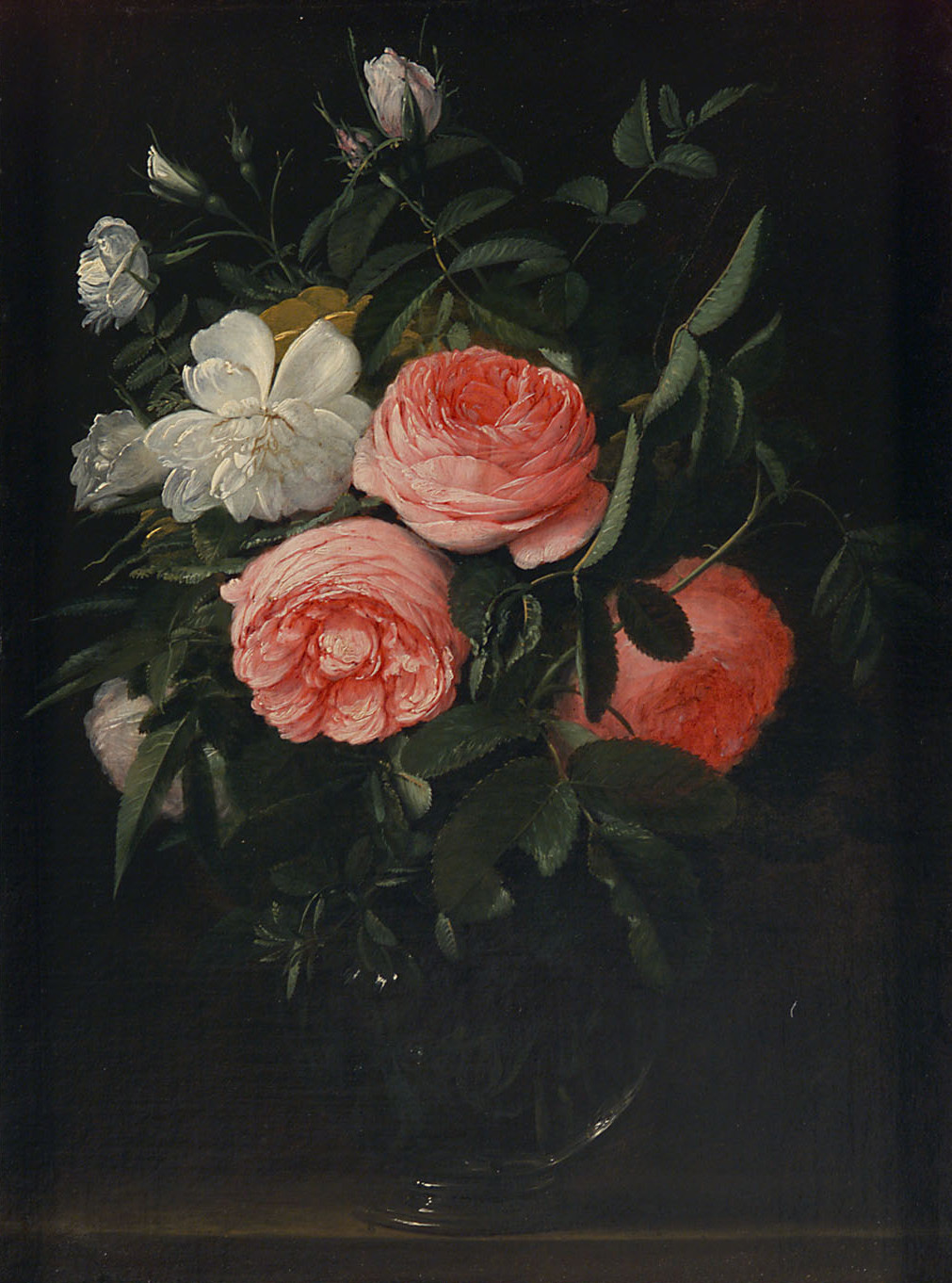
Glass with roses

Van der Baren is regarded as an amateur painter since he did not paint professionally but was principally a priest and a court official. Not many works by his hand are known. There are 14 paintings accepted as authentic, some of them signed and dated. Most of the works are still lifes.

The 1659 inventory of Archduke Leopold Wilhelm's collection shows that it included 12 works by van der Baren. The works of van der Baren in the collection comprised, besides still lifes, some architectural and park landscapes. To date no examples of works other than still lifes have been attributed to van der Baren. Some of his known still lifes include an architectural background (such as the Still Life with Pumpkins in the Kunsthistorisches Museum) or a landscape view (such as A Seascape within a Garland of Fruit in the Powis Castle and Garden, Powys, Wales, National Trust).

Van der Baren’s work shows an exactness of botanical detail and an emphasis on texture and light. While his flower pieces and garland paintings were clearly influenced by the leading flower painter in Flanders Daniel Seghers, his palette is warmer than that of Seghers.

=== Garland paintings ===
Most of his still lifes fall into the category of ‘garland paintings’. Garland paintings are a special type of still life invented in Antwerp and whose earliest practitioner was Jan Brueghel the Elder. These paintings typically show a flower garland around a devotional image or portrait. Garland paintings were usually collaborations between a still life and a figure painter.

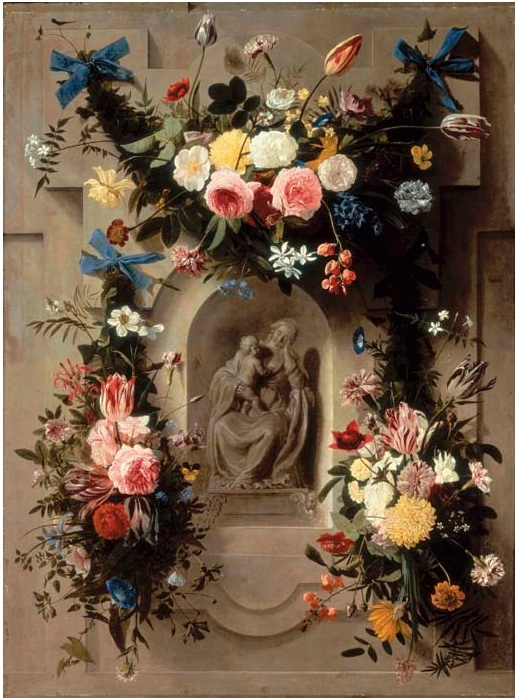
Garland of flowers surrounding a statue of the Madonna and Child

Van der Baren collaborated on garland paintings with other painters, such as Erasmus Quellinus II and the Flemish émigré painter Nikolaus van Hoy. These collaborators painted the devotional image while van der Baren painted the flower garland. An example is the Garland of flowers surrounding the Holy Family in the Museum of Fine Arts (Budapest), a collaboration with van Hoy. Another example of this genre is the Mystic Marriage of St Catherine (Royal Museums of Fine Arts of Belgium).

=== Flower pieces ===
He also painted still lifes of flowers in vases such as the Glass with roses in the Kunsthistorisches Museum. He also painted the Flower still life in a stone niche (Auctioned at Hampel Fine Art Auctions on 5 December 2008, Vienna, lot 263), which follows the early 17th century model of the presentation of a flower vase in a niche.

He further painted still lifes of vegetables and an interesting still life showing the Gifts of the Magi with a cityscape in the background (both also in the Kunsthistorisches Museum).
