= Carel de Vogelaer =

Dutch still life painter

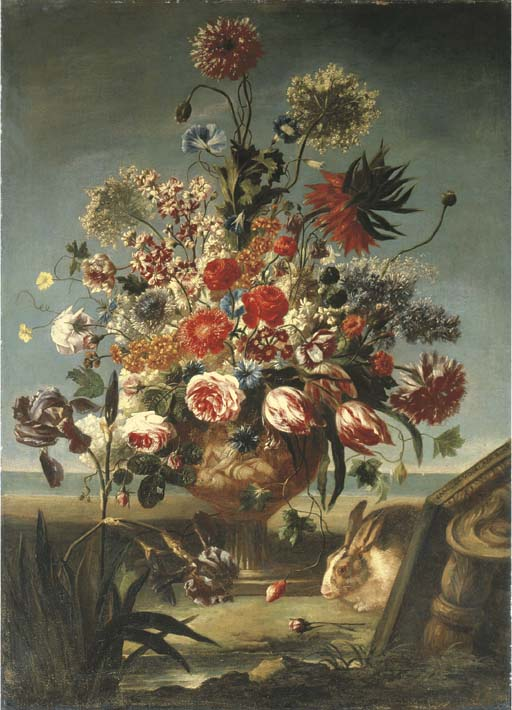
Flowers in a vase with rabbit

Karel van Vogelaer or Carel de Vogelaer, nicknamed Distelbloem (Thistle flower) (1653 - 8 August 1695) was a Dutch still life painter from Maastricht primarily active in Italy where he was known as 'Carlo dei Fiori'. He made a name with his elaborate Baroque flower pieces often with figures painted in by other artists.

== Biography ==
Vogelaer was born in Maastricht as the son of Pieter de Vogelaer who was also an artist. From 1668 he travelled through France where he visited Lyon. Later around 1671 he moved to Rome. He is first mentioned in 1675 in the records of the Bentvueghels, the society of mainly Flemish and Dutch artists working in Rome. When he joined the Bentvueghels he took the nickname 'Distelbloem', meaning "thistle flower". The thistle is incorporated in many of his paintings as a coded signature. Another nickname by which he was known in Italy was Carlo de' Fiori or Carlo dei Fiori ('Karel of the flowers') for his paintings of still life themes of flowers. Other sources call him Carlo Volgar or Carlo Vogel.

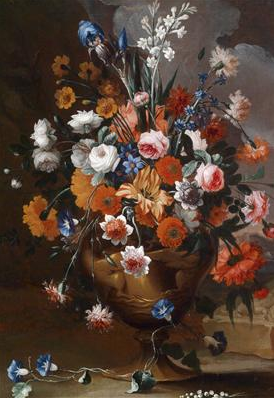
Flower piece

According to Pascoli, he enjoyed immediate success in Rome and was patronised by many of Rome's affluent collectors such as Francesco Montioni, Marchese Niccolò Maria Pallavicini, the Abate Paolucci, and Giambattista Cefalassi. But his best friends were Luigi Garzi, Gaulli and Maratta, later Franz Werner Tamm from Hamburg, with whom he often collaborated. It is said, that he also got orders from Arcangelo Corelli and the Contestabile Colonna.

In Rome Carel de Vogelaer shared a house with fellow Flemish painter Anthoni Schoonjans in the Via Margutta in the mid 1680s. By 1686 he had moved to the Via del Babuino. He trained or worked in the studio of Carlo Maratti. This had a major influence on his work.

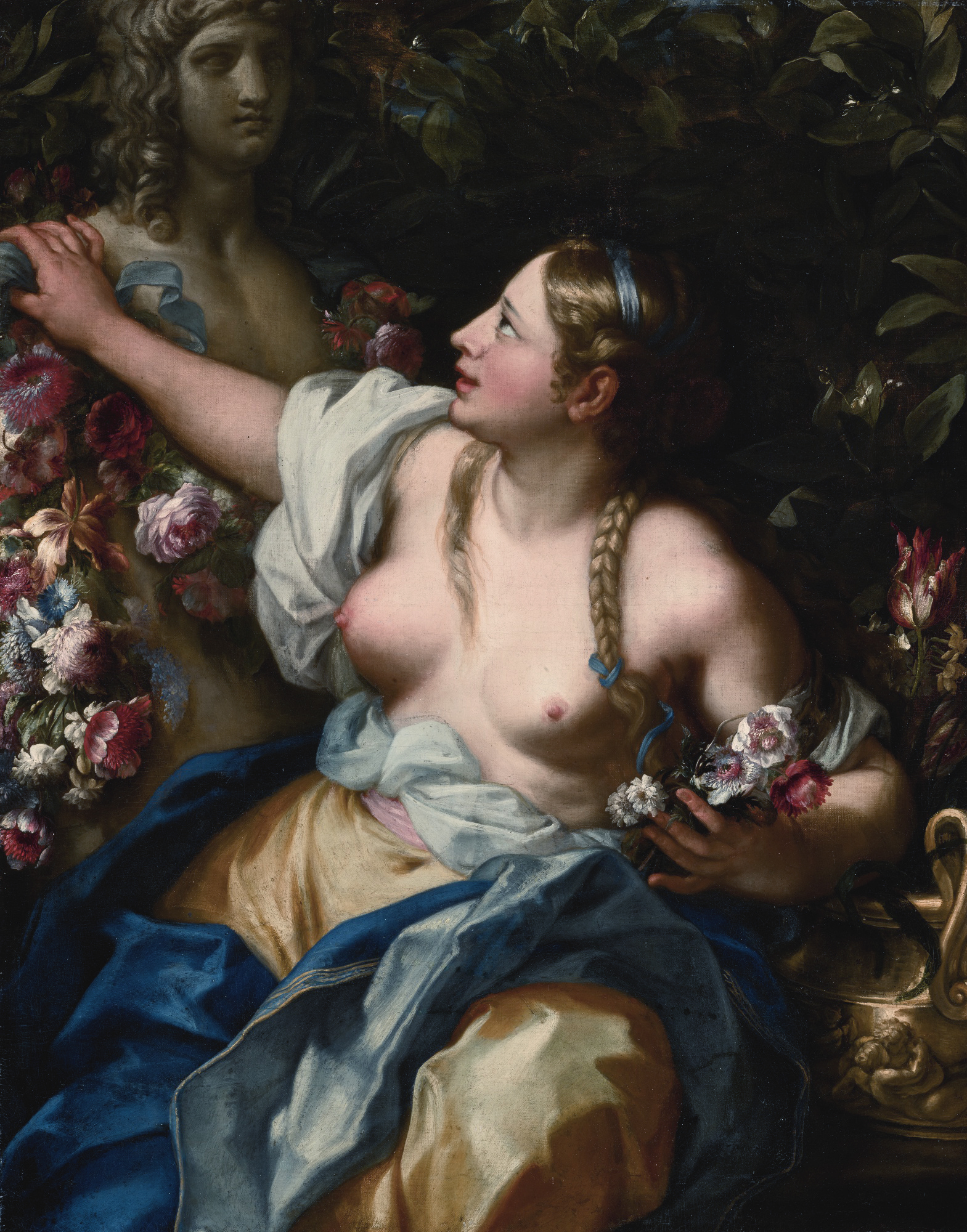
Portrait of a young woman as Flora, figure by Carlo Maratti

Vogelaer created many works together with other well-known artists with whom he was also friends, like Carlo Maratti, Luigi Garzi, Giovanni Battista Gaulli, Anthoni Schoonjans and Filippo Lauri and Mario Nuzzi (called 'Mario de' Fiori').

He died in Rome at the age of 42.

== Work ==
Carel de Vogelaer is now mainly known for his flower pieces. He also painted fruit and game pieces but none of these works are known. Only a few signed works exist.
