= St. Roch's Church, Vienna =

17th century church in Vienna

Coordinates: 48.2025°N 16.3906°E

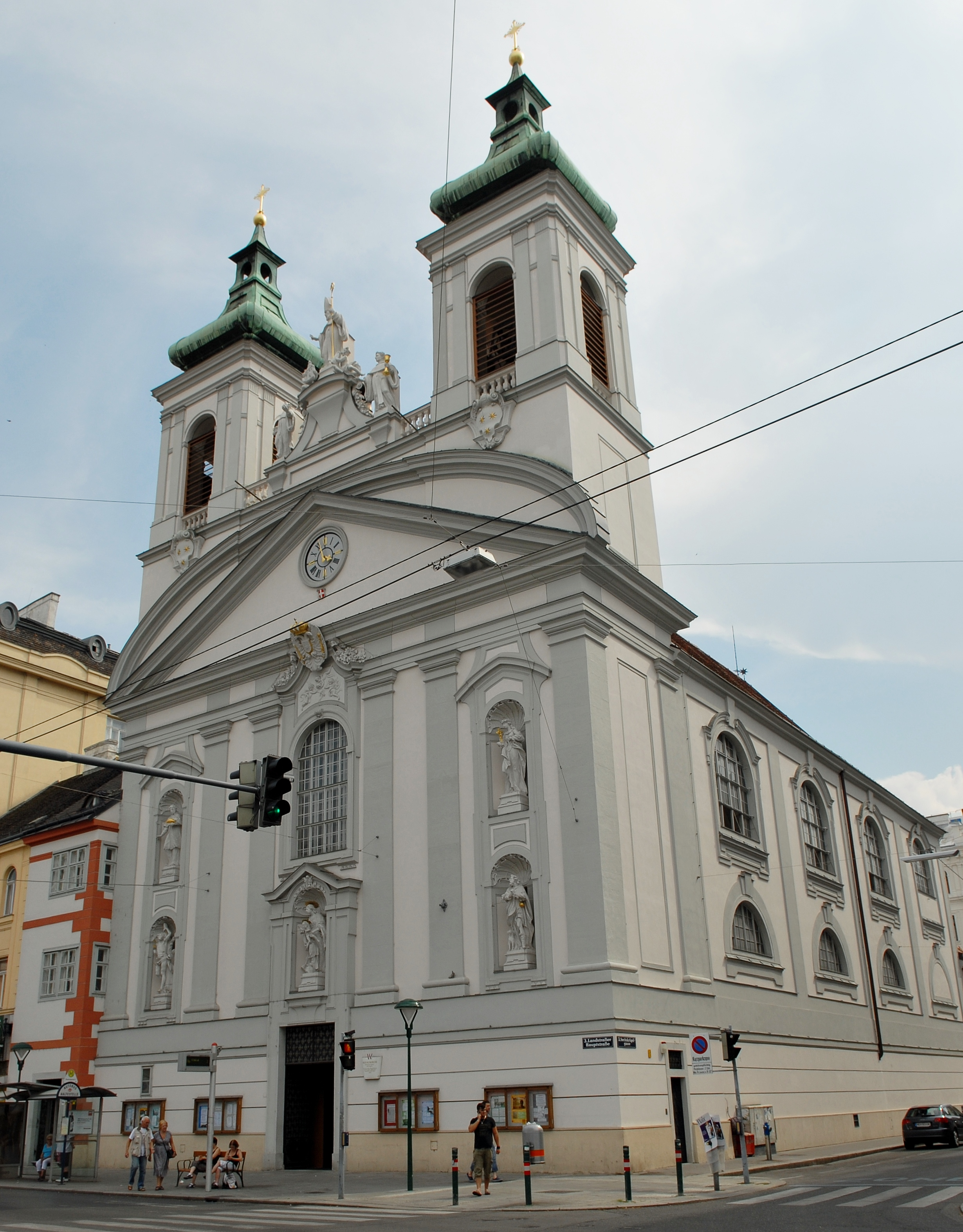
St Roch's in Vienna

The St. Roch's Church is a church in Vienna and was built in 1642 by Ferdinand III in thanks for the preservation of Vienna from the plague.
