= Erasmus Quellinus the Younger =

Flemish painter (1607–1678)

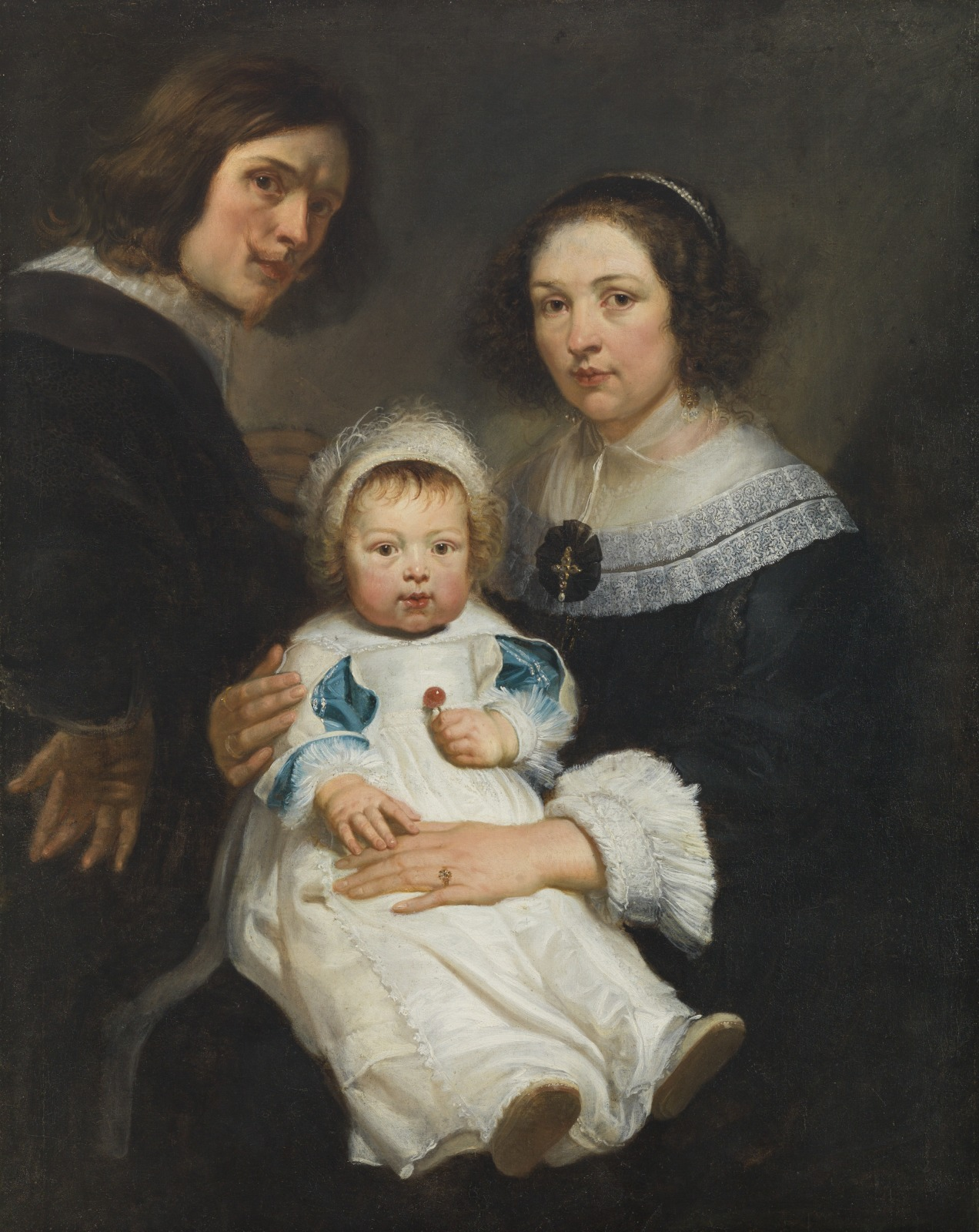
Self-portrait with his wife Catherina de Hemelaer and son Jan Erasmus

Erasmus Quellinus the Younger or Erasmus Quellinus II (November 19, 1607 – November 11, 1678) was a Flemish painter, engraver, draughtsman and tapestry designer who worked in various genres including history, portrait, allegorical, battle and animal paintings. He was a pupil of Peter Paul Rubens and one of the closest collaborators of Rubens in the 1630s. Following Rubens' death in 1640 he became one of the most successful painters in Flanders. He was a prolific draughtsman who made designs for decorative programmes in the context of official celebrations, for publications by the local publishers and for tapestries and sculptures realised by the local workshops. His work reveals the Classicist trend in the Baroque.

== Life ==
Quellinus was born in Antwerp as the son of Erasmus Quellinus I and Elisabeth van Uden. The Quellinus family became one of the leading artistic families in Antwerp, producing sculptors, painters and printmakers who would develop careers in Flanders and abroad. Father Erasmus Quellinus I, a sculptor, had moved from Sint-Truiden to Antwerp. The brothers of Erasmus Quellinus the Younger were both artists: Artus (1609–1668) was a leading Baroque sculptor and Hubertus (1619–1687) an engraver.

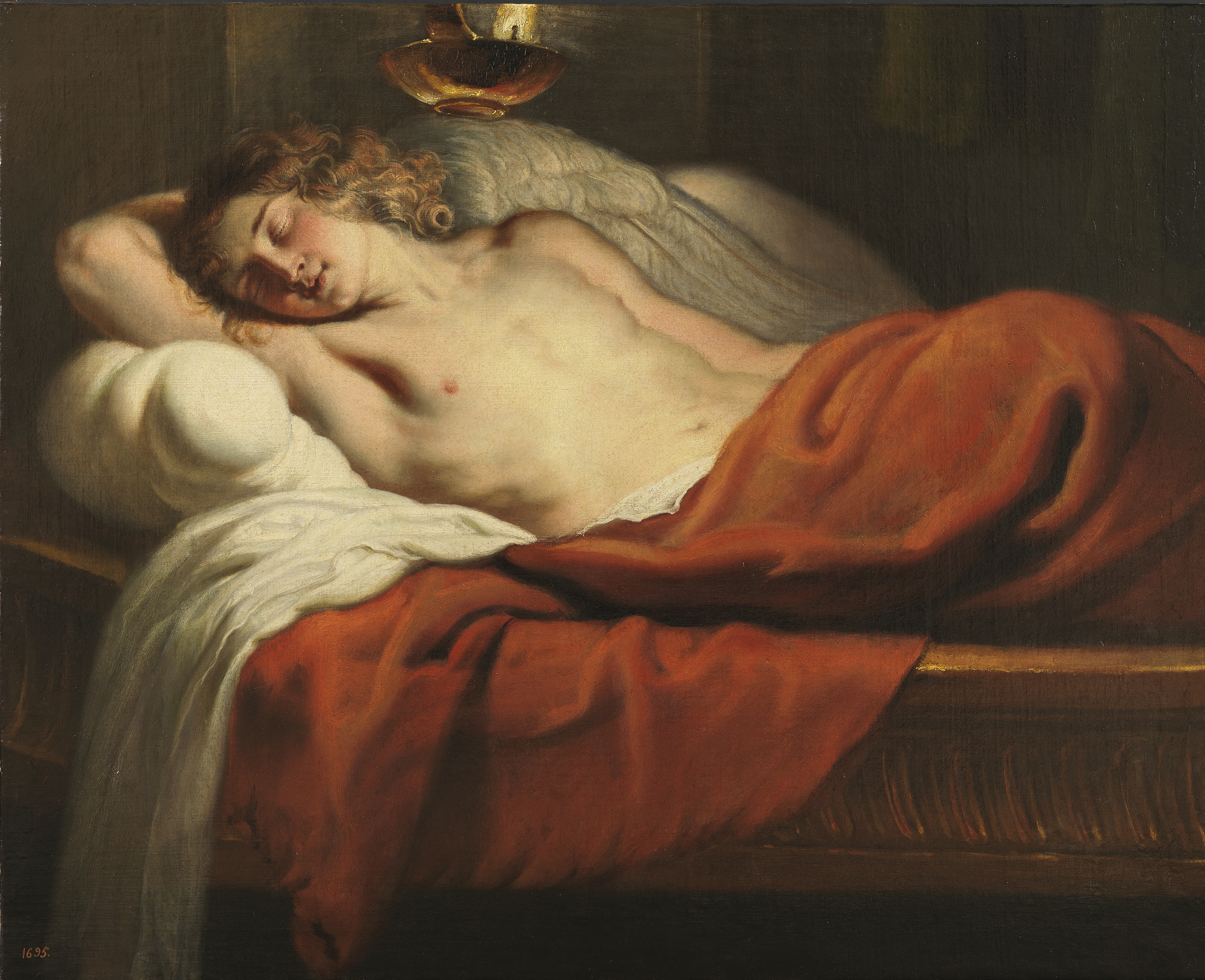
Sleeping Amor

Quellinus commenced his apprenticeship with Jan Baptist Verhaeghe, an obscure artist, in 1633. He became a master of the Antwerp Guild of Saint Luke in 1633–1634. In the 1630s, the artist worked and likely studied in the workshop of Rubens and regularly collaborated on projects with Rubens. In 1634 Erasmus II married Catharina de Hemelaer, a niece of Jan de Hemelaer, the deacon of Antwerp Cathedral. Their son Jan Erasmus followed in his father's footsteps and became a painter.

From the notes made by his son Jan Erasmus in the margin of his copy of Cornelis de Bie's book of artist biographies entitled Het Gulden Cabinet, it is known that Erasmus II obtained a degree in philosophy. This explains the fact that he wrote a philosophical tract entitled Philosophia, which was recorded in the 1679 inventory of his estate.

Quellinus became a regular collaborator of Rubens starting from 1635. He first worked on the decorations for the Joyous Entry into Antwerp of the new governor of the Habsburg Netherlands Cardinal-Infante Ferdinand. Rubens was in overall charge of this project. Quellinus made decorative paintings after designs by Rubens of which six have survived. In the period 1636-1638 Rubens' workshop received a large commission to make mythological decorations for the hunting pavilion Torre de la Parada of the Spanish king Philip IV near Madrid. For this project Quellinus painted decorations after oil sketches by Rubens some of which have been preserved (Prado Museum). In early 1637 Quellinus drew frontispieces for the Antwerp printing house Plantin Press according to Rubens' instructions regarding iconography and layout. These drawings were in Quellinus' own style as Rubens let him a free hand in the design of the modelli.

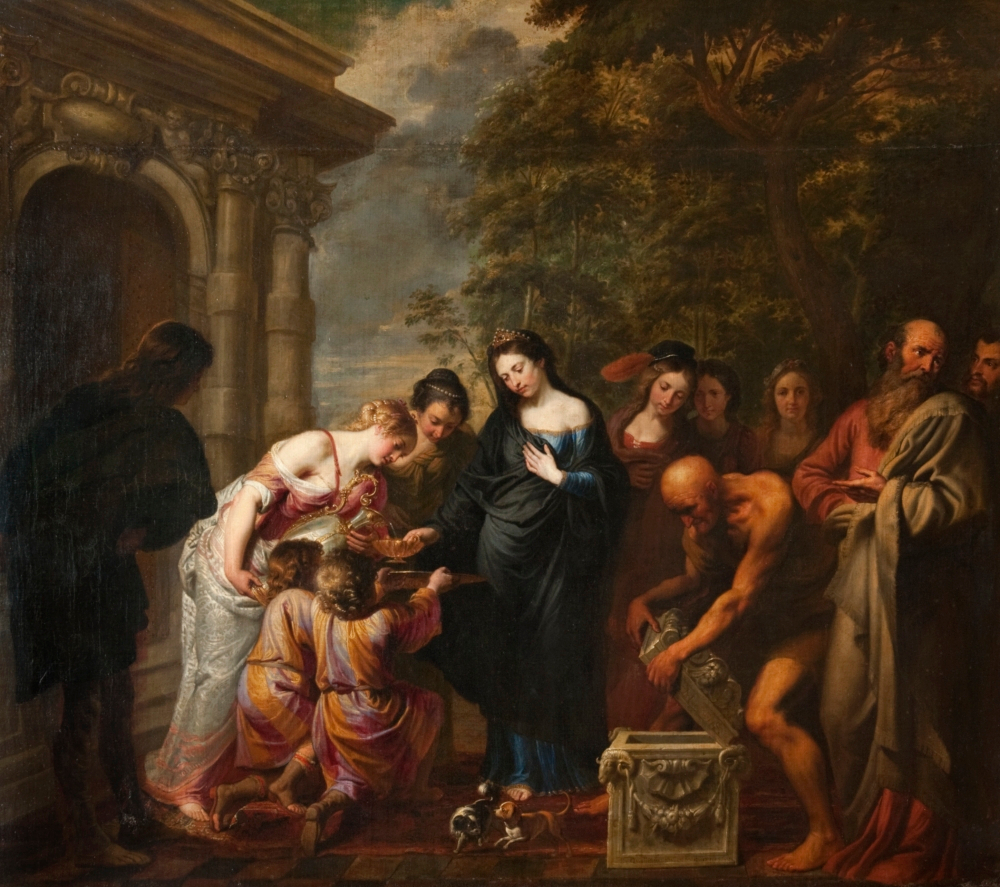
Artemisia

His brother Artus Quellinus I returned to Antwerp from Rome around 1640. Artus worked in a classicizing style of Baroque under the influence of his compatriot, the sculptor François Duquesnoy, in whose workshop in Rome he had worked. This style had in turn been influenced by the Classicism of Annibale Carracci. The two brothers would from then on work together on various projects and mutually influence each other.

After Rubens' death in 1640 Erasmus Quellinus became one of the leading history painters of Flanders. He received many commissions for altarpieces in the region. In 1648 he was commissioned to make the decorations for the Joyous Entry of the Archduke Leopold Wilhelm into Antwerp, thus playing the same role as Rubens 13 years earlier for the Joyous Entry of Ferdinand. He made the decorations for the announcement of the Treaty of Westphalia in the same year.

Around 1656 Erasmus worked in Amsterdam where his brother Artus was responsible for the decoration of the new City Hall. Erasmus assisted in this project and the brothers also collaborated on other commissions. Erasmus painted altarpieces for clandestine Catholic churches in Amsterdam.

His first wife died in 1662. On 9 November 1663, Erasmus Quellinus II married Françoise de Fren. De Fren was the daughter of the well-off André de Fren, secretary of the Council of Brabant, and the sister of Isabella de Fren, who was married to the court painter David Teniers II. In 1665 Quellinus designed a cenotaph for the deceased Philip IV of Spain and the decorations for the Joyous Entry of Don Francisco de Moura as governor of the Habsburg Netherlands.

Quellinus died in Antwerp on 7 November 1678.

His pupils included his son Jan Erasmus Quellinus, Guilliam Forchondt (II), Julius de Geest, Willem de Ryck, Anthoni Schoonjans, Wallerant Vaillant and Remacle Serin.

== Work ==
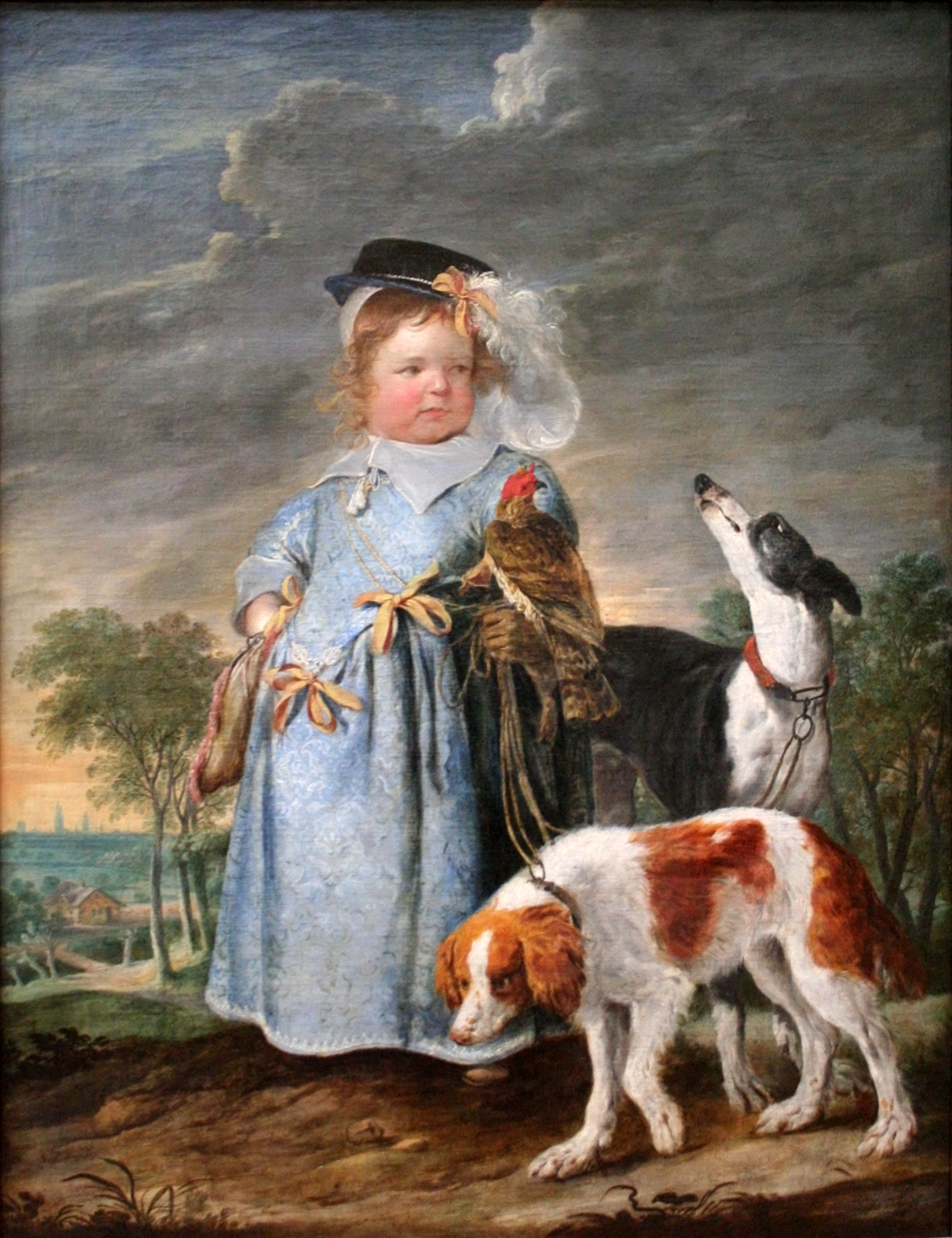
Portrait of a young boy

=== General ===
Quellinus was a very versatile artist who worked in various genres. He received numerous commissions for altarpieces depicting Counter-Reformation themes for churches and monasteries throughout the Southern Netherlands. He also received many civic commissions which allowed him to show his learning in the depiction of scenes from ancient history and mythology and allegorical compositions. In addition, he produced portraits, battle scenes and designs for tapestries. Like Rubens, Quellinus was a pictor doctus with a strong grounding in ancient history and philosophy. He had built an extensive library and art collection. This learning is reflected in the subject matter of his work.

Even while he was a frequent collaborator with Rubens' workshop in the 1630s, Quellinus developed a personal style distinctive from that of Rubens. This style is reminiscent of the Antwerp followers of Caravaggio such as Theodoor Rombouts and Gerard Seghers. Characteristics of this style are the strong modeling of forms achieved through a sculptural use of light. Quellinus' oldest known work is the 1634 Adoration of the Shepherds (Alte Pinakothek, Munich), which is in this Caravaggesque mode.

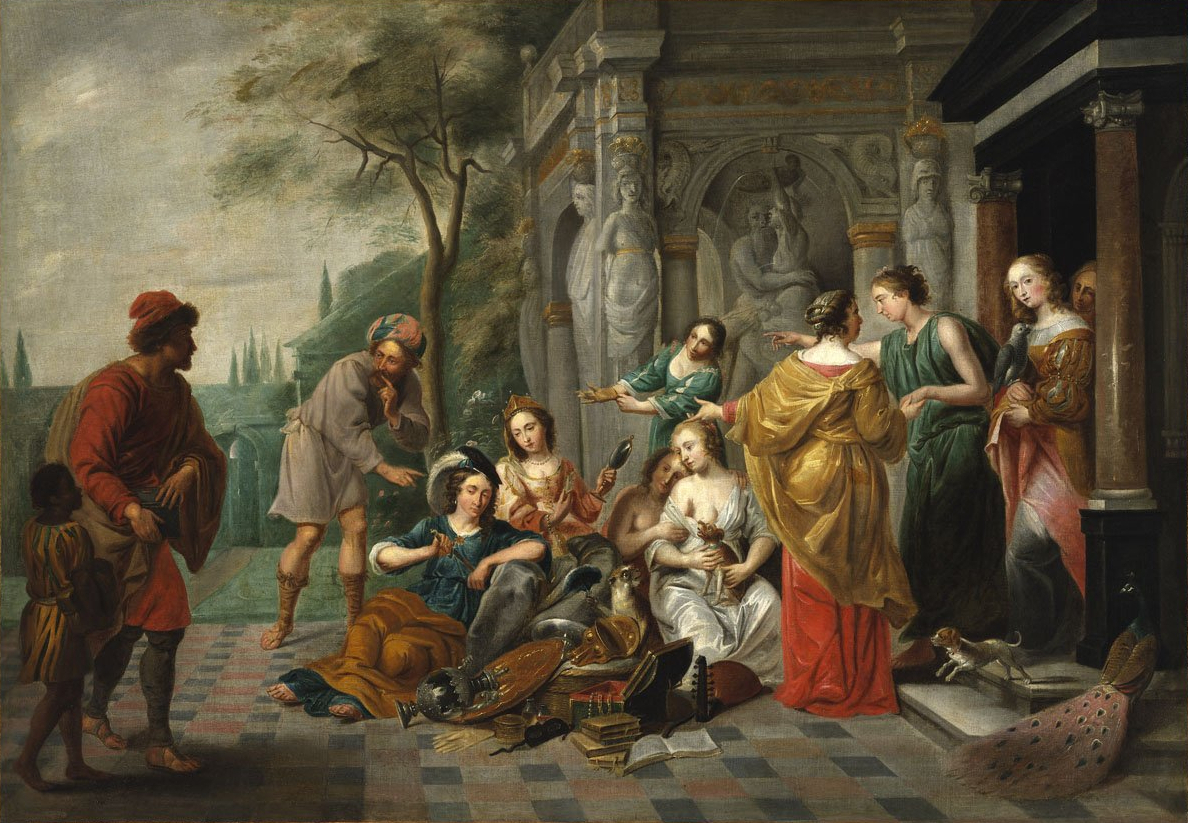
Achilles with the daughters of Lycomedes

From the 1640s, his style took on a classicizing aspect and a sculptured look. Erasmus never travelled to Italy so this stylistic development was likely influenced by the work of his brother Artus, who introduced his own style of classicizing Baroque in Flemish sculpture after returning from Rome in 1640. Both brothers depicted similar idealizing Antique figures in their work in this period. His Adoration of the Holy Sacrament (1646) was painted in this style.

From c. 1650 this classicism in his work became rigid and his compositions from this period made use of a limited number of stereotyped and idealized figure types. This stylistic development is evident in the interior decorations he made for the new City Hall of Amsterdam, which he executed in collaboration with his brother Artus. The brothers achieved stylistic agreement in this commission: the Judgement of Solomon, which Artus sculpted for the Council Chamber, is repeated in a painting by Erasmus. This development towards classicist rigidity may reflect the influence of French art with its preference for classicism.

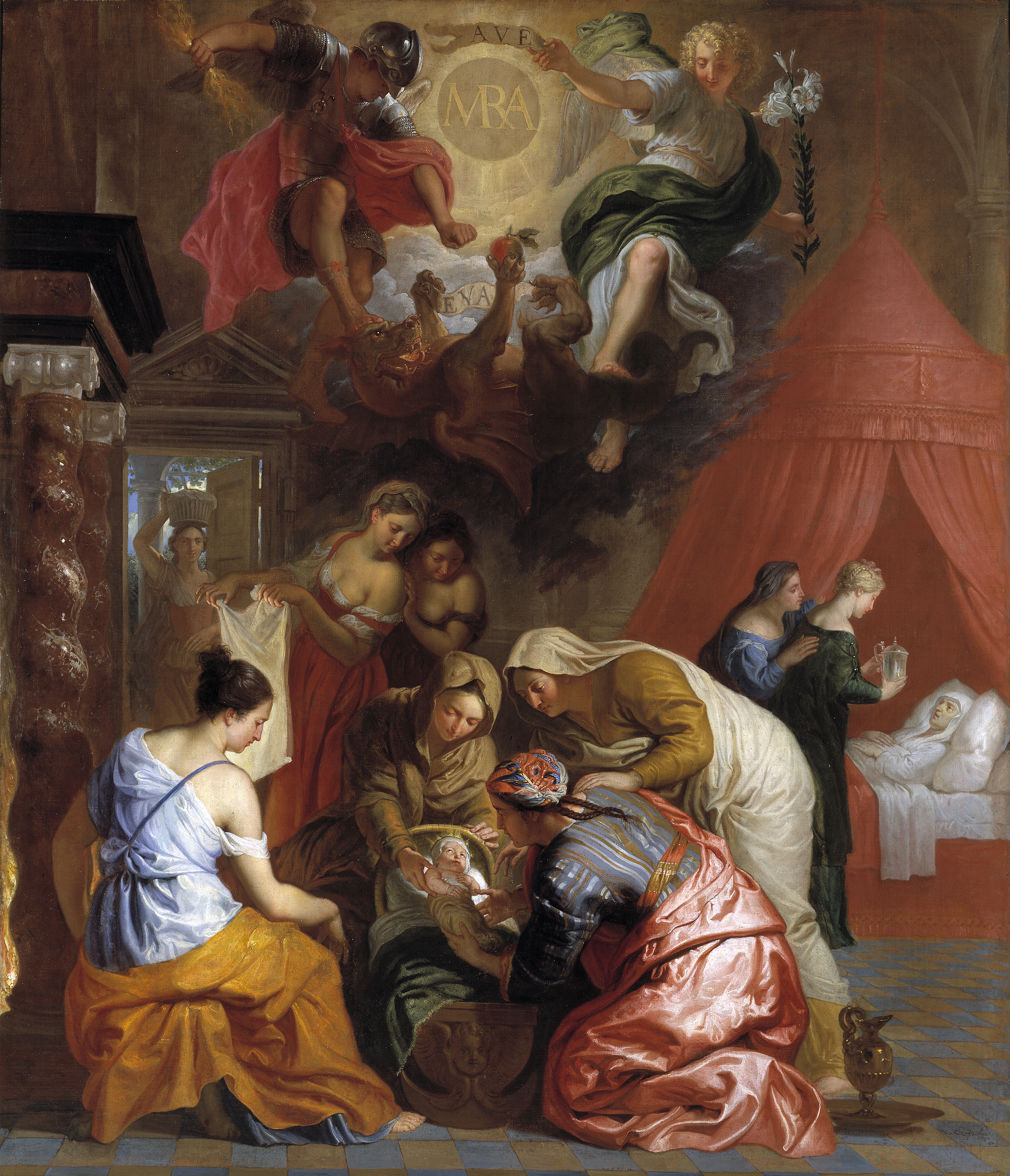
Birth of the Virgin

Erasmus' work also gained a theatrical aspect as reflected in the 1652 painting Artemisia (Hunterian Museum and Art Gallery, University of Glasgow). The painting has a theatrical background like a park. This tendency became more evident in the 1660s when his paintings started to include grandiose scenery with flamboyant architecture. This is clear in the Let the Children Come to Me of 1664 (Royal Museums of Fine Arts of Belgium, Brussels). These later compositions possible reflect an influence by the early work of his son Jan-Erasmus Quellinus.

=== Collaborations ===
As was common in Antwerp at the time, Quellinus collaborated with other painters. He worked with still life specialists on still lifes and portraits. Many of the still lifes fall into the category of 'garland paintings'. Garland paintings are a special type of still life invented in Antwerp and whose earliest practitioner was Jan Brueghel the Elder. These paintings typically show a flower garland around a devotional image or portrait. Garland paintings were usually collaborations between a still life and a figure painter.

Quellinus collaborated on garland paintings with still life specialists, such as his brother-in-law Jan Philip van Thielen, Daniel Seghers, Jan Pieter Brueghel, Frans Ykens, Peter Willebeeck and Jan Anton van der Baren. These collaborators painted the flower garland while Quellinus painted the figures and architectural setting. An example is the Holy Family in a Wreath of Flowers in the Hermitage Museum, a collaboration with Frans Ykens. Quellinus further collaborated with the animal and still life painter Jan Fyt on portraits such as the Portrait of a young boy (Royal Museum of Fine Arts Antwerp) of c. 1650. Quellinus also collaborated with animal painters Peter Boel and genre painter Jan van Kessel the Elder.

=== Tapestry designs ===
Quellinus executed various tapestry designs. In 1649 he produced the designs for a tapestry series depicting the History of the Thurn and Taxis Family (Royal Museums of Fine Arts of Belgium, Brussels). These designs are executed in his classicizing style. He also made a series of 8 sketches with battle scenes for another tapestry series also kept in the Royal Museums of Fine Arts of Belgium.

=== Graphic designs ===
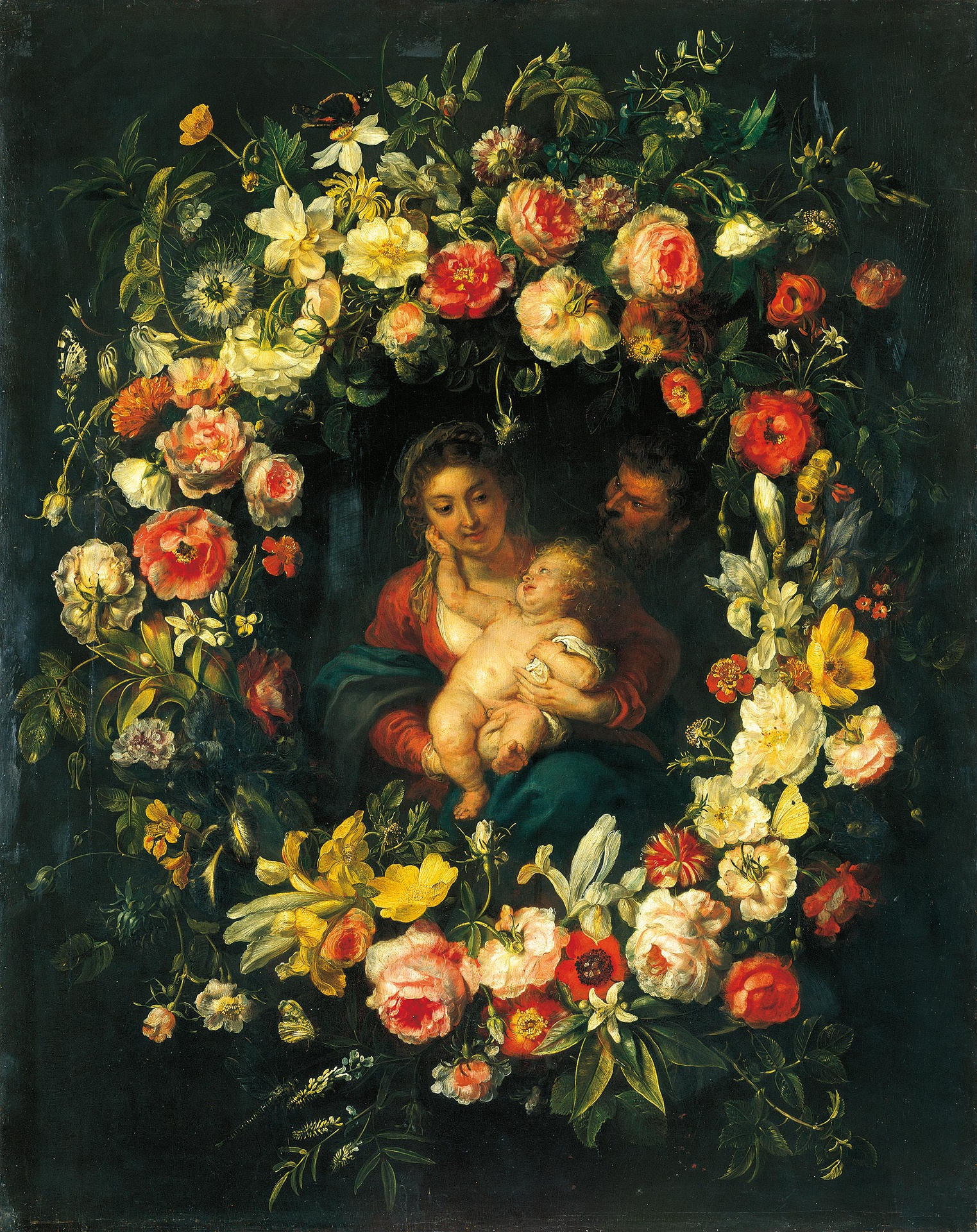
Holy Family in a wreath of flowers

In addition to the frontispieces he produced for the Plantin Press, he made designs for various publications for the Antwerp publishers. This includes his designs for the Den methamorphosis ofte Herscheppinge van P. Ovidivs Naso: verdeelt in XV boecken, versiert met figueren, a translation into Dutch of Ovid's Metamorphoses by Seger van Dort. For this book, which Geeraerdt van Wolsschaten published in Antwerp in 1650, Erasmus made the designs for the illustrations which were engraved by Pieter de Jode II. He also contributed a poem to the introduction of the publication.

=== Sculptural designs ===
Quellinus came from an artistic family whose predominant activity was the design and execution of sculptures and architectural decorations. His father, older brother and cousin as well as his brother-in-law Pieter Verbrugghen I were all prominent sculptors who worked for a local and international clientele. It is therefore no surprise that Erasmus was a prolific designer of sculptures and decorative projects. The inventory of his estate lists hundreds of drawings, of which at least 43 are for architecture, which would have included altarpieces and large-scale sculptures as well as others for sculpture and decoration. He is believed to have contributed designs for the organs in the Antwerp cathedral and Saint Paul's Church in Antwerp, as well as several altarpieces, executed by his brother-in-law Pieter Verbrugghen I. A drawing by Erasmus has been identified as being a study for a group of three music-making angels on one of the organs, although none corresponds exactly to the angels now on the organs. It seems that in these designs he did not attempt to create a precise three-dimensional model to be followed by the sculptor but rather an outline from which the sculptor executing the sculpture could work freely.
