= Hubertus Quellinus =

Flemish printmaker

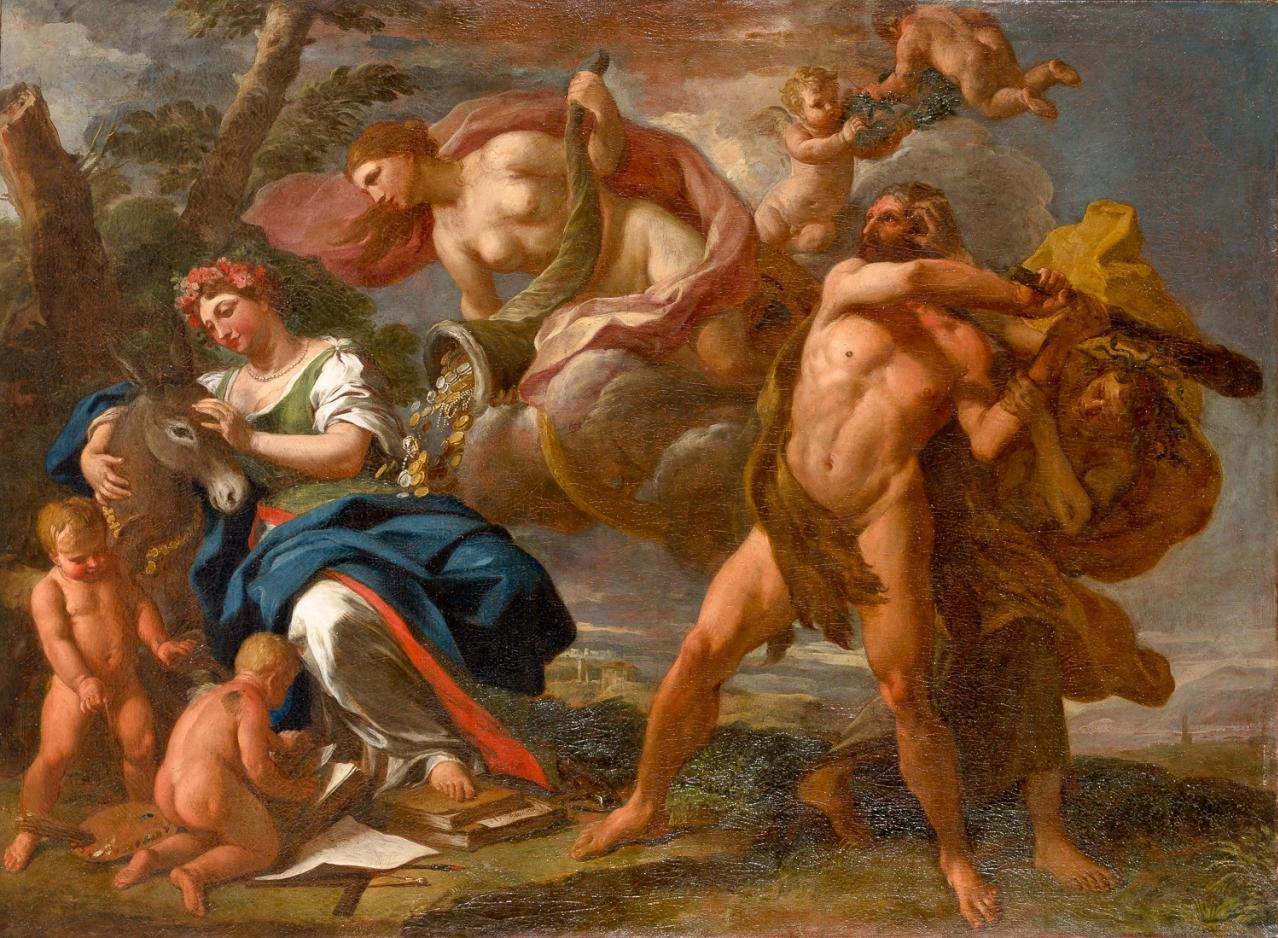
Heracles and Omphale

Hubertus Quellinus or Hubert Quellinus (15 August 1619, Antwerp – 1687) was a Flemish printmaker, drawing artist and painter and a member of the prominent Quellinus family of artists. His engravings after the work of his brother, the Baroque sculptor Artus Quellinus the Elder, were instrumental in the spread of the Flemish Baroque idiom in Europe in the second half of the 17th century.

== Life ==
Hubertus Quellinus was born in Antwerp on 15 August 1619 as the son of Erasmus Quellinus the Elder and Elisabeth van Uden. His family was a family of sculptors and painters which included, amongst others, his father and his brothers, the Rubens pupil Erasmus Quellinus the Younger and the prominent sculptor Artus Quellinus the Elder. Hubertus' mother was the sister of the prominent landscape painter Lucas van Uden.

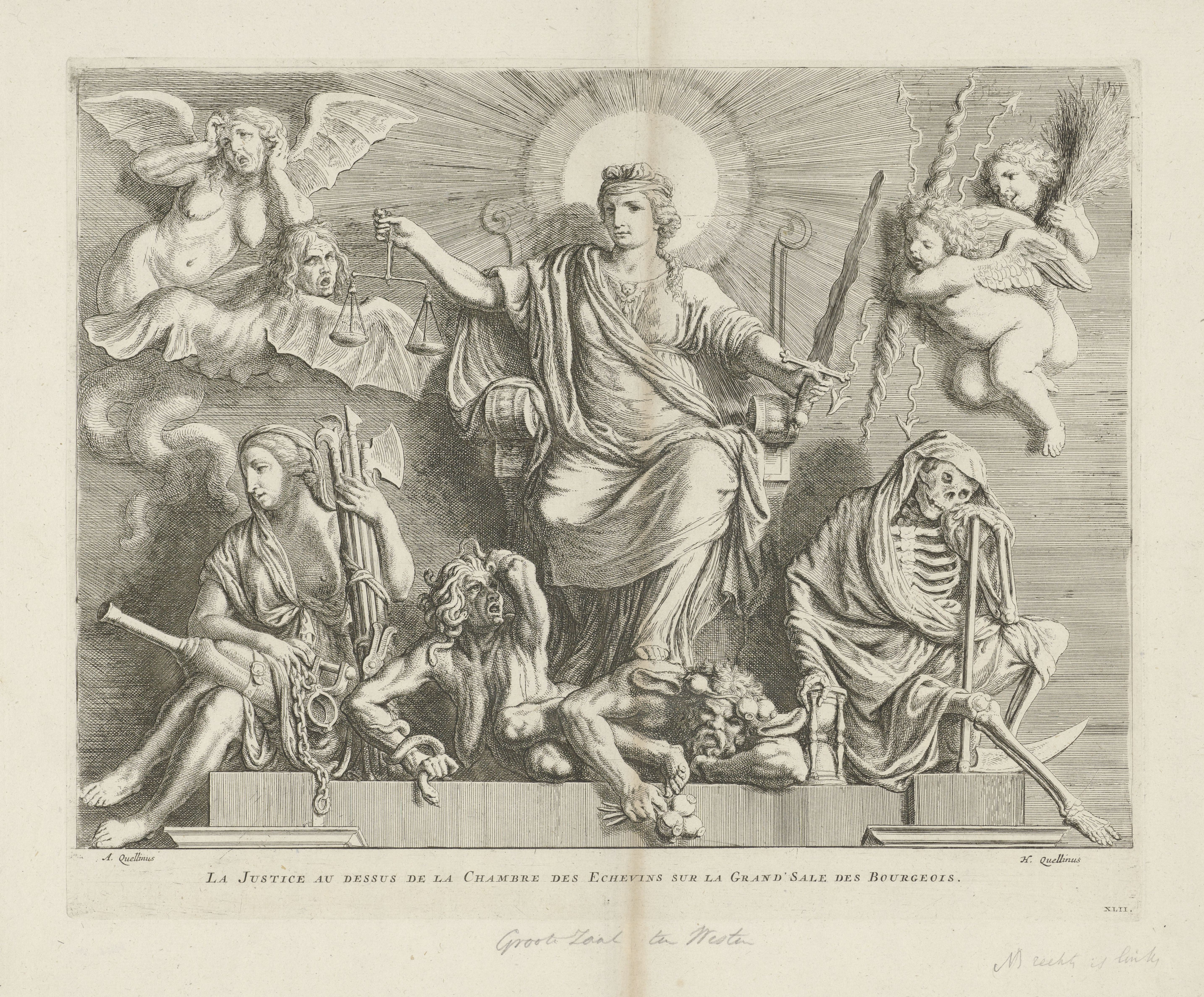
Allegory of Justice, after Artus Quellinus' statues in the Amsterdam City Hall

In 1650 he traveled to Rome where he joined the Bentvueghels, an association of mainly Dutch and Flemish artists working in Rome. It was customary for the Bentvueghels to adopt an appealing nickname, the so-called 'bent name'. Hubertus was given the bent name Saracin. He witnessed that he was present when the lifeless body of Pietro Testa was the retrieved from the Tiber in 1650.

He was recorded in Amsterdam in 1655. Between 18 September 1665 and 18 September 1666 he registered at the Guild of St. Luke in Antwerp as a wijnmeester’ [son of a master] in the specialty of engraver. Quellinus was in Amsterdam by 1660 where he collaborated on a publication on the new City Hall of Amsterdam.

Om 9 August 1666 he sold in Amsterdam 113 copper plates, including their 15-year patent, regarding Amsterdam City Hall to Frederik de Wit. He returned to Antwerp where he was buried on 2 March 1688. His death duties were met between 18 September 1687 and 18 September 1688.

== Work ==
Quellinus was mainly an engraver of architecture but he also made some portraits and painted some history paintings.

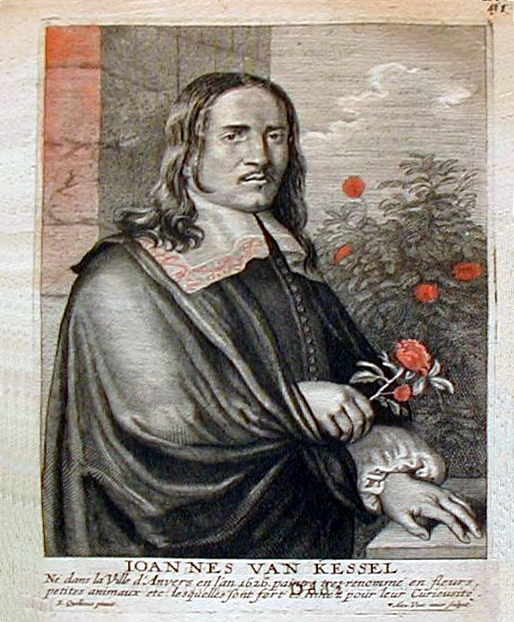
Portrait of Jan van Kessel from Het Gulden Cabinet

The publication on the new City Hall of Amsterdam was published in Amsterdam in 1660 consisted of two parts: Afbeelding van 't stadt huys van Amsterdam: in dartigh coopere plaaten (Images of the City Hall of Amsterdam in 30 copper plates), by Jacob van Campen and De voornaemste statuen ende ciraten vant konstrijck stadthuys van Amstelredam, tmeeste in marmer gemaeckt door Artus Quellinus (The main statues and ornaments of the Amsterdam City Hall mostly made in marble by Artus Quellinus). The first part consisted of 30 plates depicting the Amsterdam City Hall after designs made by Jacob Vennekool and engraved by Dancker Danckerts while the second part of the publication in two volumes included prints after the marble statues and ornaments executed by Artus Quellinus the Elder in the Amsterdam City Hall. The designs for these prints in the second part were made and engraved by Hubert Quellinus and were marked with the initials of both Artus (A. Q) and Hubertus Quellinus (H. Q). The two parts formed a volume in folio. The first part was published initially in 1655 while the second part was first published in 1663 in Amsterdam but the publisher Frederick de Widt (or 'de Witt') changed the dates on the Quellinus prints to 1665 and 1668. The publication was instrumental in the spread of the Baroque style in Northern Europe until the end of the 17th century, and was used by nearly all followers of the Flemish Baroque style in Europe as the most important pattern-book and source of inspiration in the fields of architectural ornamentation and sculpture.

He also engraved portraits.
