= Artus Quellinus the Elder =

Flemish sculptor (1609–1668)

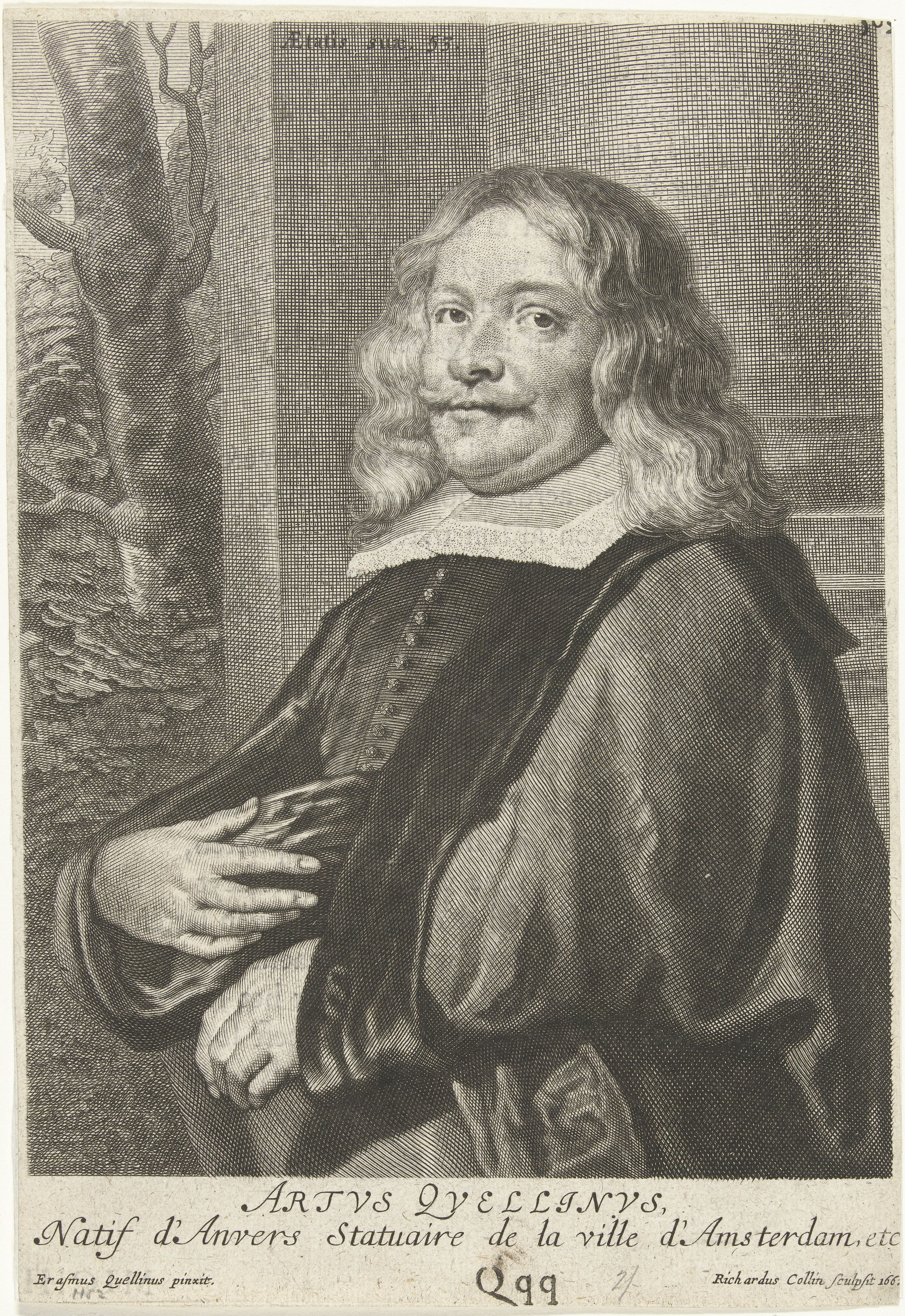
- Artus Quellinus I after a painting by Erasmus Quellinus II (1662).
- Born: 20 or 30 August 1609; Antwerp, Spanish Netherlands
- Died: 23 August 1668 (aged 58); Antwerp, Spanish Netherlands
- Known for: Sculpture
- Movement: Baroque

Artus Quellinus the Elder, Artus Quellinus I or Artus (Arnoldus) Quellijn (20 or 30 August 1609, Antwerp – 23 August 1668, Antwerp) was a Flemish sculptor. He is regarded as the most important representative of the Baroque in sculpture in the Southern Netherlands. He worked for a long period in the Dutch Republic and operated large workshops both in Antwerp and Amsterdam. His work had a major influence on the development of sculpture in Northern Europe.

== Life ==
Artus Quellinus the Elder was born into an artistic family. He was the son of the respected Antwerp sculptor Erasmus Quellinus I and Elisabeth van Uden. His brothers became prominent artists: Erasmus was a painter and Hubertus was an engraver and painter. His sister Cornelia married his father's pupil, the sculptor Pieter Verbrugghen the Elder.

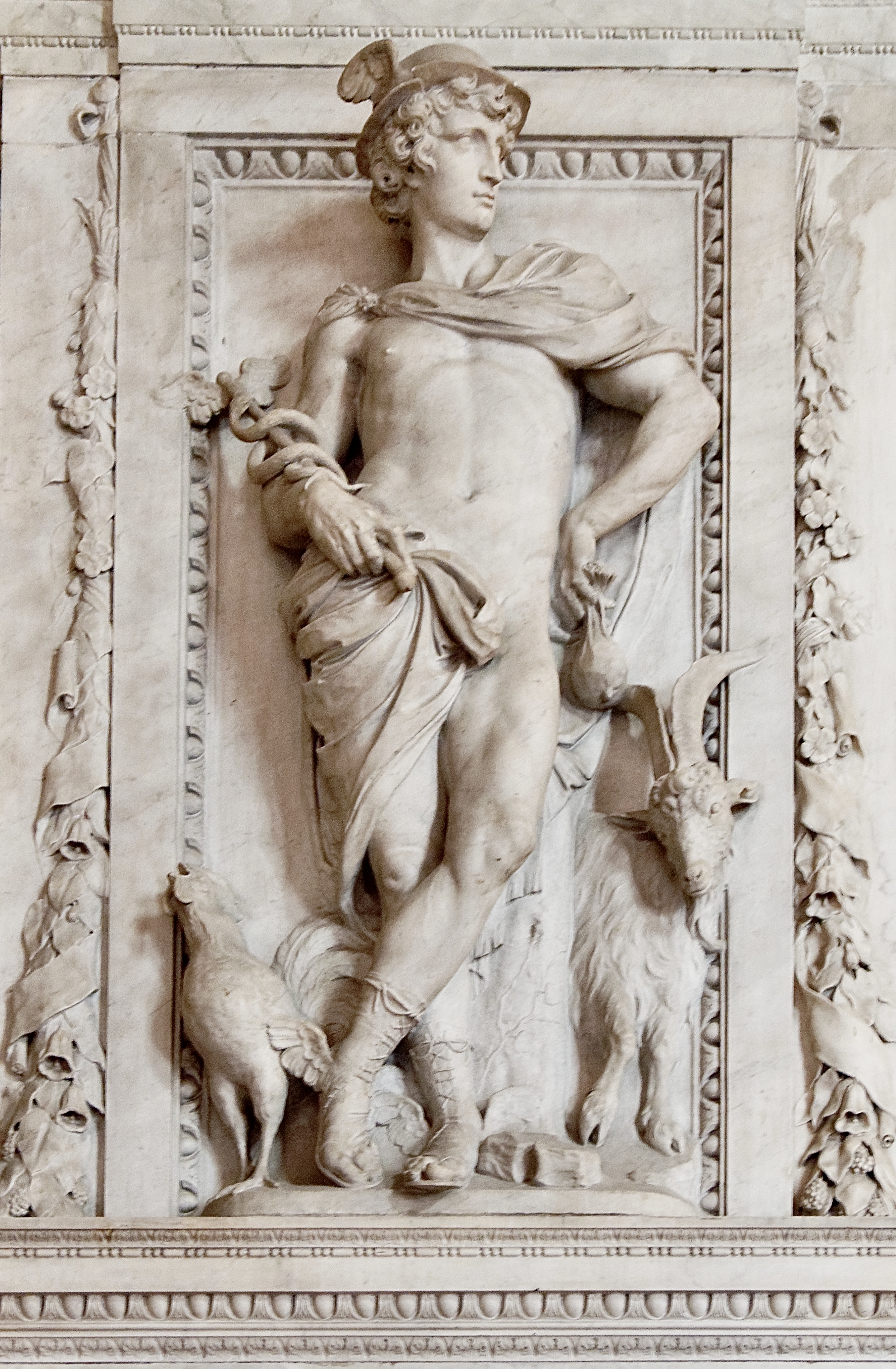
Mercury, Amsterdam city hall

Artus Quellinus received his first training from his father. In the period from 1635 to 1639 he trained in Rome in the studio of his compatriot François Duquesnoy.

He spent time in Lyon together with the Flemish painter Laureys Franck and was in contact there with the Dutch engraver Nicolaas van Helt Stockade and the Dutch painter Jan Asselijn.

He returned to Antwerp in 1639 and became member of the local Guild of Saint Luke in 1640–41. In 1640 he took over the workshop of his father and married Marguerite Verdussen (she died on 12 February 1668). He worked in Amsterdam in the years 1646 and 1647 and also spent time in Sweden.

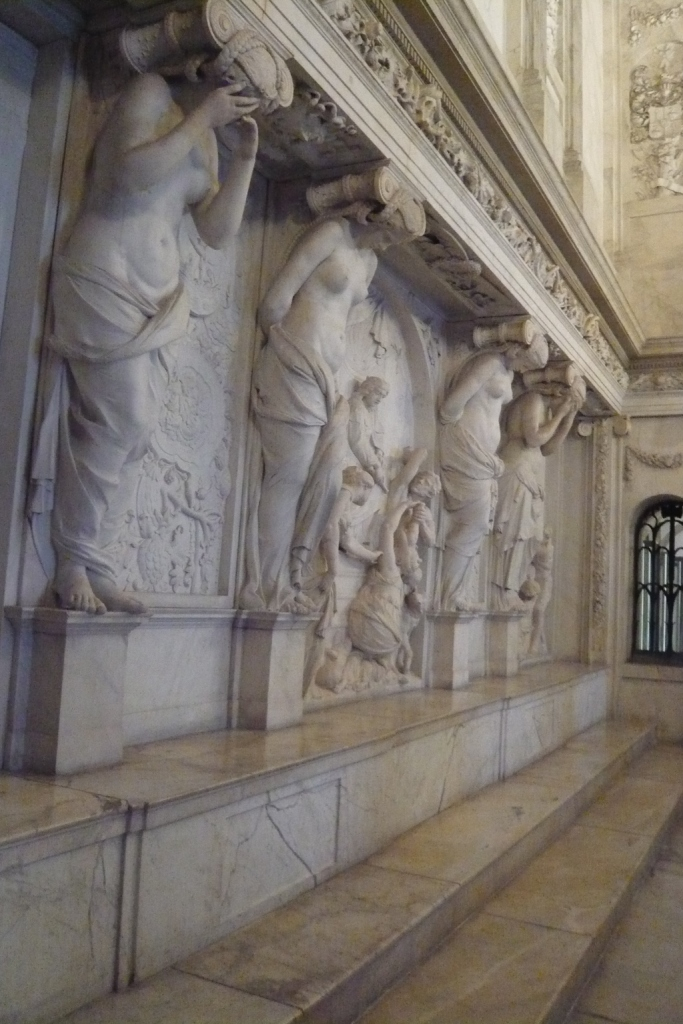
Vierschaar, Amsterdam city hall

He won commissions in Amsterdam and, from 1650 onwards, worked for fifteen years on the new city hall together with the lead architect Jacob van Campen. Now called the Royal Palace on the Dam, this construction project, and in particular the marble decorations he and his workshop produced, became an example for other buildings in Amsterdam. One of his great patrons was Amsterdam burgomaster and statesman Andries de Graeff. The team of sculptors that Artus supervised during his work on the Amsterdam city hall included many sculptors who would become leading sculptors in their own right such as his cousin Artus Quellinus II, Rombout Verhulst, Bartholomeus Eggers and Gabriël Grupello and probably also Grinling Gibbons.

He returned to work in Antwerp in 1658 and remained active mainly in this city until his death.

His many pupils included his cousin Artus Quellinus II, Martin Deurweerders, Grinling Gibbons, Gabriël Grupello, Pieter Verbrugghen I, Lodewijk Willemsens, Jackes Janssen (1641–42); Hendricus Quellinus (1643–44); Hubertus Daep (1651–52); Aurelius Gompaert (1651–52); Gabriël Grupello (1658–69); Jan Bouttil (1660–61); Lodewyk Willemsen (1661–62); Jasper van Steen (1664–65); Lambertus Lowies (1666–67) and Dirick Willekens van Werelt (1667–68). Many of these students would become leading sculptors in their own right who would help spread the late Baroque style across Europe.

== Work ==
=== General ===
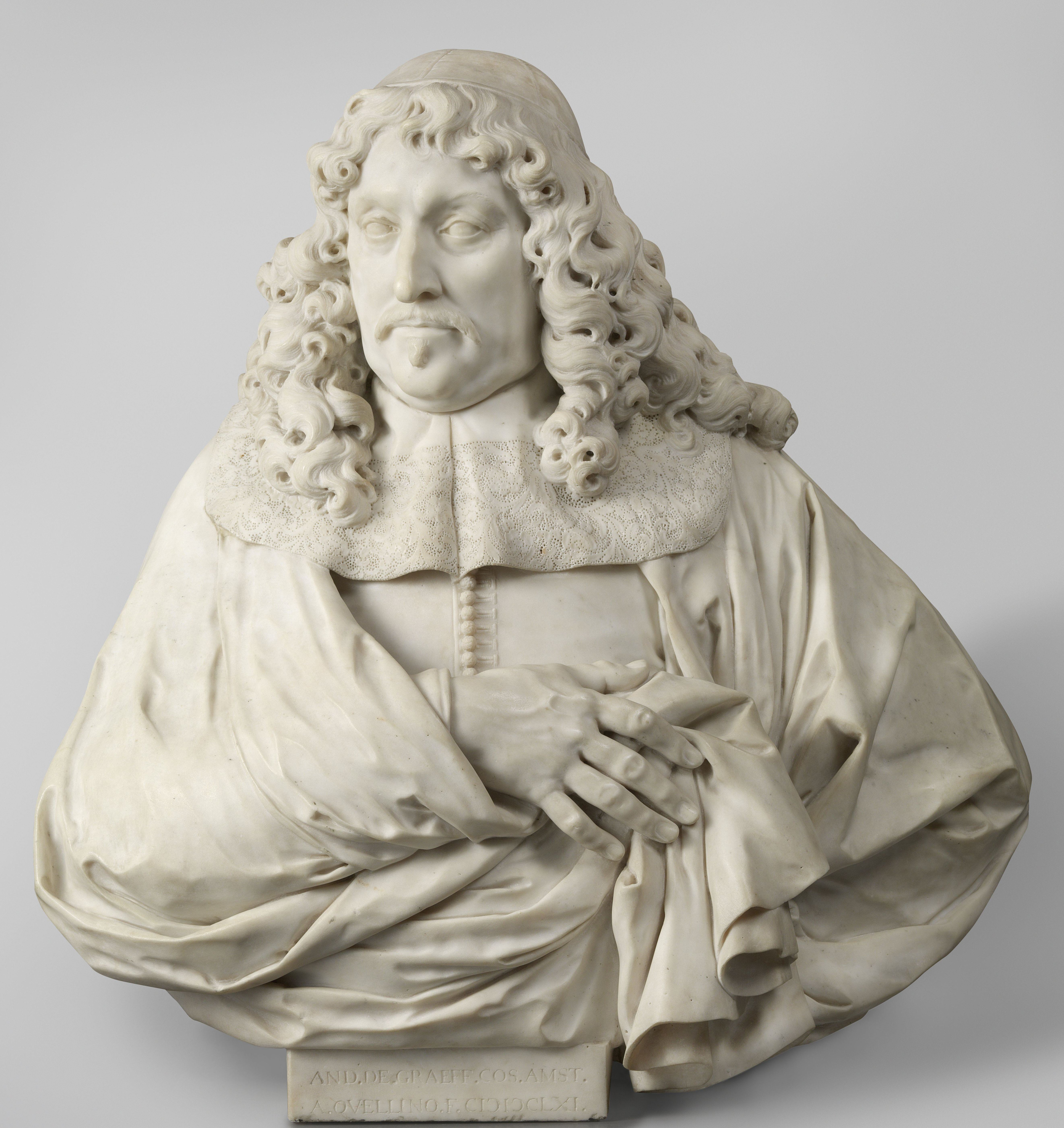
Bust of Andries de Graeff, 1661

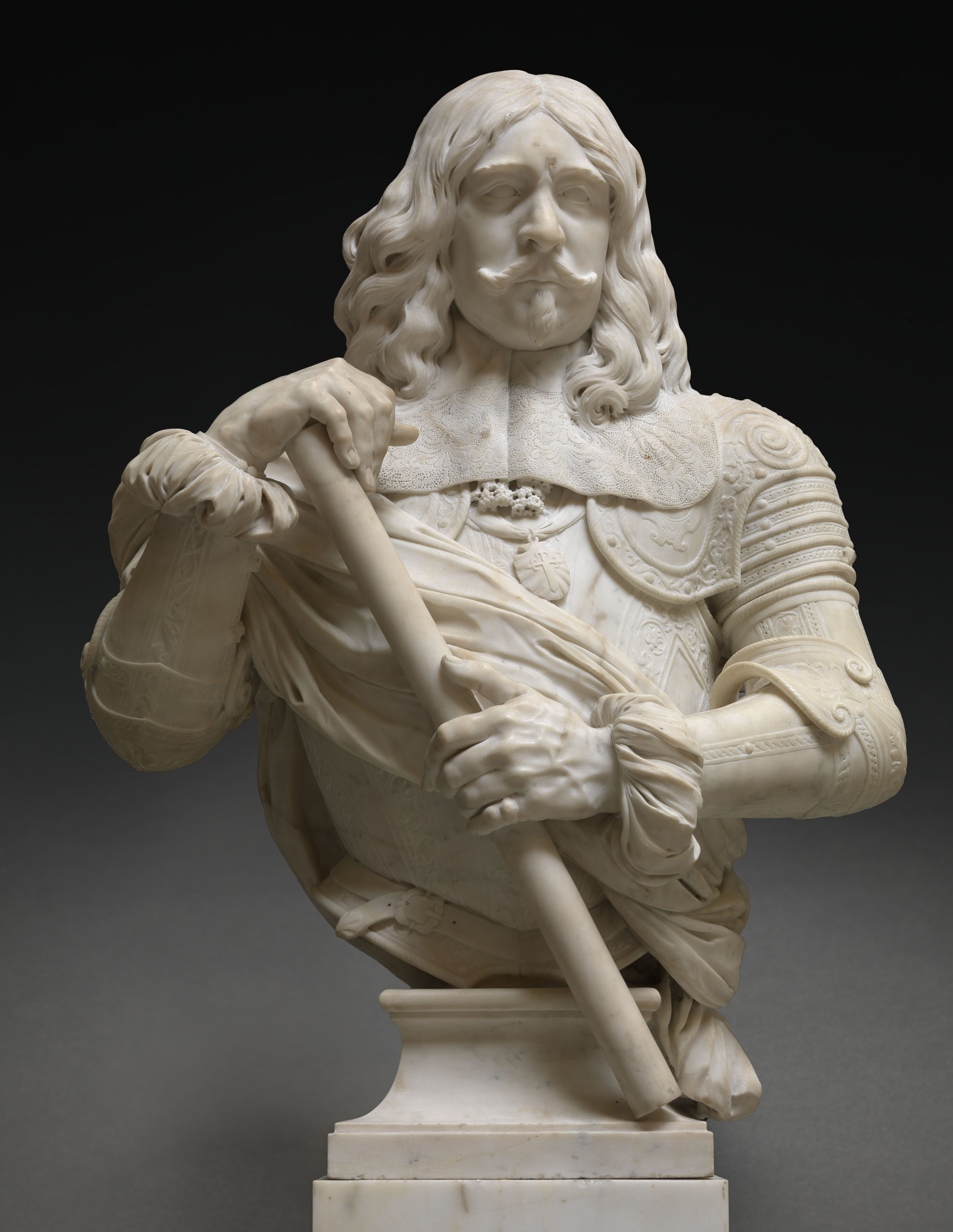
Bust of Luis de Benavides Carrillo, Marquis of Caracena, 1664

Quellinus had brought back from Italy a new vision of the role of the sculptor. The sculptor was no longer to be an ornamentalist but a creator of a total artwork in which architectural components were replaced by sculptures. The church furniture became an occasion for the creation of large-scale compositions, incorporated into the church interior. Stylistically he introduced the classicizing Baroque style of François Duquesnoy (the so-called la gran maniera greca) to his native Antwerp. He thus introduced into Flemish sculpture the Baroque style developed by François Duquesnoy, which was based on classical sculpture. This style was less expressive than the Baroque style of Gian Lorenzo Bernini, the main competitor of François Duquesnoy in Rome. Another influence on his work that mitigated Dusquesnoy's clacissistic tendencies was the realism of Johannes van Mildert and Lucas Faydherbe, two sculptors who had worked closely with Peter Paul Rubens.

As Artus Quellinus I mainly worked on monumental commissions, most of his work is to be found in situ with as principal locations the cities of Brussels, Antwerp and Amsterdam.

Artus Quellinus I also produced small-scale sculptures such as ivory-carvings.

=== Amsterdam city hall ===
His work on the city hall of Amsterdam was very influential. It was popularised by his brother Hubertus, who engraved many of his works in the city hall and published a book of these together with 30 architectural drawings by van Campen in 1665. One particular feature of the city hall, the so-called vierschaar or tribunal, reflected the fashion of the period and, in particular, the ideals of the Italian architect Andrea Palladio and his pupils Vincenzo Scamozzi and Cesare Ripa. An exhibition was held, focusing on the work of Quellinus, from June to September 1977.

=== Funerary monuments ===
In the Dutch Republic Artus Quellinus I was further noted for funerary monuments and portrait busts. His monumental tomb for Otto Christoph von Sparr, Generalfeldmarschall of Brandenburg-Prussia, in the St. Mary's Church, Berlin had an important influence on the development of tomb sculpture in Northern Germany. Another tomb monument he made in Germany was that for Frederick III, Duke of Holstein-Gottorp in Schleswig Cathedral.

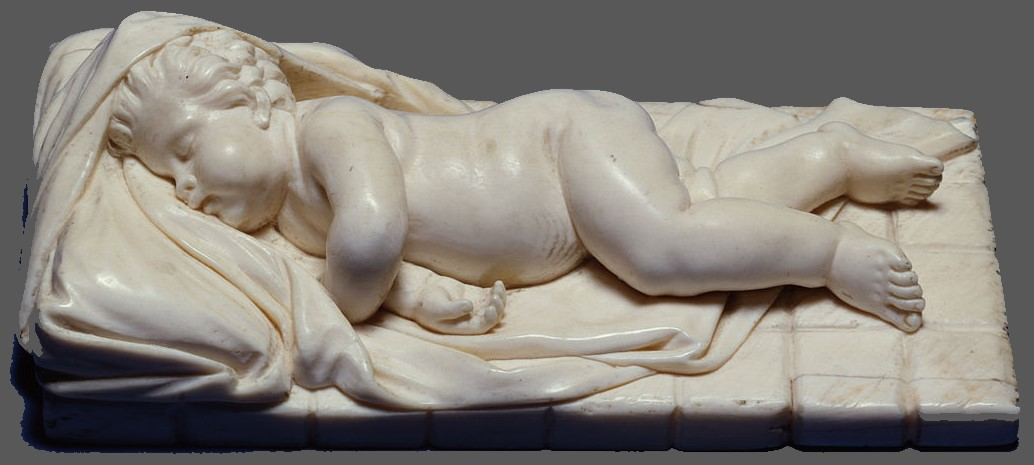
Sleeping baby, ivory

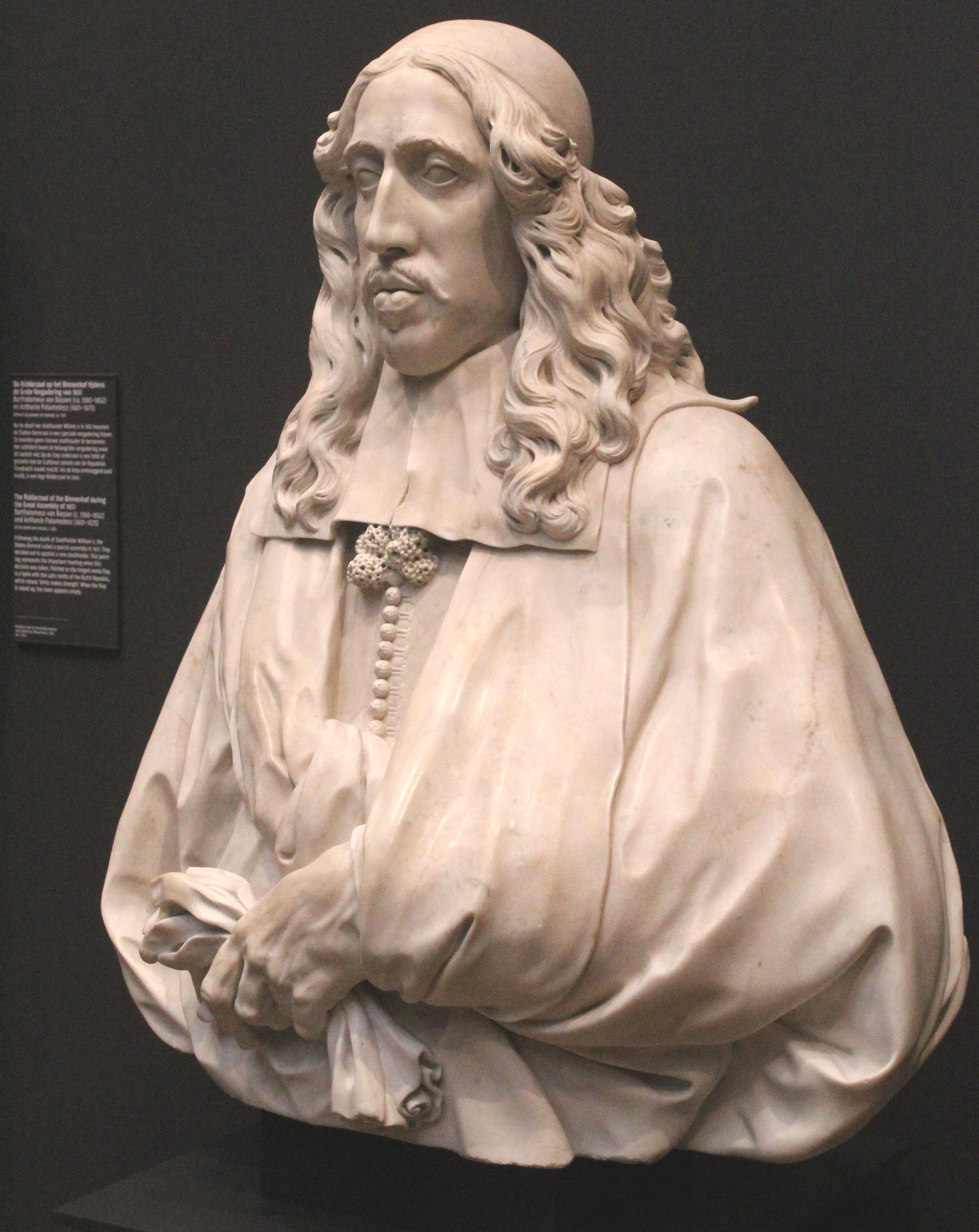
Bust of Grand pensionary Johan de Witt (1665)

=== Portrait sculpture ===
Artus Quellinus I made an important contribution to Dutch portrait sculpture through a series of portraits of leading citizens such as the Burgomasters of Amsterdam, their wives and, in particular, a bust of the Grand Pensionary of Holland, Johan de Witt and one of his uncle Amsterdam burgomaster Andries de Graeff. The portraits combine the classical style with late Baroque devices such as the inclusion of the arms of the sitter. His sculptures were so popular in Amsterdam that the leading Dutch writers Joost van den Vondel and Jan Vos dedicated poems to his work.

His oeuvre after his return to Antwerp in 1658 is less well known. The most important piece is undoubtedly the half-length marble portrait bust of Luis de Benavides Carrillo, Marquis of Caracena, the Governor of the Southern Netherlands, with its realistically sculpted facial features and free flowing hair.
