= Erasmus Quellinus the Elder =

Flemish sculptor

Erasmus Quellinus I or Erasmus Quellinus the Elder (alternate names: Erasmus Quellinck, Erasme Quellin (I)) (Sint-Truiden, 1584 - Antwerp, 22 January 1640) was a Flemish sculptor best known for classically inspired ornamentation work and copies after the antique. He was the founder of an important Antwerp dynasty of artists.

== Life ==
Details of his early life and training have not survived. He became master of the Antwerp Guild of Saint Luke in 1606. He married Betje van Uden, the sister of the painter Lucas van Uden. The couple had three sons: Erasmus, who would become a painter and engraver, Artus, who would follow in his father's footsteps and become a sculptor, and Hubertus, who became an engraver and painter. His daughter Cornelia Quellinus married his pupil, the sculptor Pieter Verbrugghen the Elder.

He was the teacher of Pieter Verbrugghen the Elder, Melchior Charles, Wallerant Vaillant, Joos Sterck (1607); Rombout Claes (1609), Melchior van der Lanen (1612), Hans Franscoys (1614), Hans Bernaert (or Beernart) (1615) and Christoffel de la Fontaine (1633–34).

== Work ==
His work is not well known since only a few of his works have survived. Erasmus is primarily known as a sculptor who drew inspiration from antiquity. He worked in the late Renaissance style although his later work shows a development towards early Baroque. The bulk of his commissions consisted of the renovation and replacement of church furniture that had been destroyed during the iconoclastic troubles of the 16th century. Besides decorative work, he is known to have made individual statues, none of which have survived.

In 1635 he was awarded the contract to make the pulpit of the St. Elisabeth Hospital in Antwerp. This work is an example of early Baroque in Antwerp and shows Erasmus’ mastery of balance and symmetry, even though there is no sense of realism.

The pulpit in the St. Gummarus Church in Lier is another of his known commissions. He made the original design for the pulpit, which, after his death, was somewhat changed by his son Artus while Pieter Verbrugghen the Elder executed the design.

== Sources ==
- Hans Vlieghe, "Erasmus Quellinus I," Grove Art Online. Oxford University Press, [November 9, 2007].
- Hans Vlieghe (1998). Flemish Art and Architecture, 1585-1700. Pelican History of Art. New Haven: Yale University Press. ISBN 0-300-07038-1
