= Van der Hagen =

Van der Hagen is a Dutch-language toponymic surname, meaning "from/of the "haag". A haag was a bushland, hedged lot, or (private) hunting ground. The name could also specifically refer to an origin in The Hague (since 1242 known as De Hage and variant spellings). Some variant spellings of the name are Van der Haagen, Van der Haegen, Van der Haeghen, Van der Hage, and Van der Haghen. People with such names include:

- Abraham van der Haagen (1587–1639), Dutch painter and engraver
- Alf van der Hagen (born 1962), Norwegian journalist
- Amand Vanderhagen (1753–1822), Flemish clarinetist and teacher
- Gaspar van der Hagen (fl 1744–1769), Flemish sculptor and ivory carver
- Joris van der Haagen (c.1615–1669), Dutch landscape painter
- Steven van der Hagen (1563–1621), Dutch sailor, first admiral of the Dutch East India Company
- Willem van der Haegen (1430–1510), Flemish-born Azorean nobleman, explorer, and colonizer
- Willem Van der Hagen (died 1745), Dutch painter active in Ireland

== See also ==
- Vanderhaeghe, alternative spelling of the name
- Verhagen, contracted form of the surname
