= Artus Quellinus =

Artus Quellinus can refer to three members of the Flemish Quellinus family, all sculptors:

- Artus Quellinus the Elder (or Artus I, 1609–1668)
- Artus Quellinus II (or the Younger, 1625–1700), cousin of Artus the Elder
- Artus Quellinus III (1653–1686), son of Artus II
