= Verhagen =

Verhagen is a Dutch-language toponymic surname. It is a contraction of Van der Hagen, meaning "from/of the haag. A haag was a bushland, hedged lot, or (private) hunting ground. The name could also specifically refer to an origin in The Hague (since 1242 known as De Hage and variant spellings). Some variant spellings of the name are Verhaagen, Verhaegen, Verhaeghe, Verhaeghen, Verhage, and Verhaghen. People with the name include:

- Ben Verhagen (1926–2020), Dutch competitive sailor
- Britta Verhagen, pseudonym of Alberta Rommel (1912–2001), German music educator and writer
- Darrin Verhagen (born 1967), Australian electronic music composer
- David A. Verhaagen (born 1964), American psychologist and writer
- Drew VerHagen (born 1990), American baseball pitcher
- Eduard Verhagen (born 1962), Dutch pediatrician and lawyer
- Eric Verhagen (born 1964), Dutch sidecarcross passenger
- Hans Verhagen (1939–2020), Dutch journalist, poet, painter and filmmaker
- Herna Verhagen (born 1966), Dutch businesswoman
- Jean Verhagen (1923–1977), American actress known as Jean Hagen
- Maxime Verhagen (born 1956), Dutch politician and government minister
- Neil Verhagen (born 2001), American racing driver
- Pieter-Jozef Verhaghen (1728–1811), Flemish painter (also spelled "Verhagen")
- Sanne Verhagen (born 1992), Dutch judoka
- Steven Verhagen (usually "van der Hagen"; 1563–1621), Dutch sailor, first admiral of the Dutch East India Company
- Thijs Verhagen (born 1981), Dutch racing cyclist

== See also ==
- Mount Verhage, Antarctic mountain named after US Navy officer Ronald G. Verhage
- Verhaegen, a surname
- Verhaeghe (disambiguation)
