= Verhaegen =

Verhaegen is a Dutch-language toponymic surname common in the Belgian provinces of Antwerp and Flemish Brabant. Though, like Verhagen, meaning "from the bushland or hedged lot", at least the name of the noble family of Pierre-Théodore Verhaegen finds its origin in the town of Haacht (originally meaning "hedge" as well). Some other variant spellings of the name are Verhaagen, Verhaeghe, Verhaeghen, Verhage, and Verhaghen. People with the name include:

- Arthur Verhaegen (1847–1917), Belgian architect and a Catholic Party politician, grandson of Pierre-Théodore
- Augustinus Verhaegen (1886–1965), Belgian composer and Benedictine monk
- Benoît Verhaegen (1929–2009), Belgian historian on Congo
- Fernand Verhaegen (1883–1975), Belgian painter and etcher
- Frans Verhaegen (1948–2026), Belgian racing cyclist
- Marc Verhaegen (born 1957), Belgian comics artist
- Marie-Pierre Verhaegen (born 1966), Belgian historian and countess
- Pé Verhaegen (1902–1958), Belgian racing cyclist
- Peter Verhaegen (1800–1868), Belgian Catholic priest, missionary to the United States, first president of Saint Louis University and St. Joseph's College in Bardstown, Kentucky
- Pierre-Théodore Verhaegen (1796–1862), Flemish lawyer and liberal politician, founder of the Free University of Brussels
- Theodoor Verhaegen (1701–1759), Flemish sculptor

== See also ==
- Paul Verhaeghen (born 1965), Belgian novelist
- Mount Verhaegen, an Antarctic mountain named for Baron Pierre Verhaegen, collaborator of the expedition
- Saint Verhaegen, a holiday celebrating the founding of the Free University of Brussels
