= Thomas Quellinus =

Flemish sculptor (1661–1709)

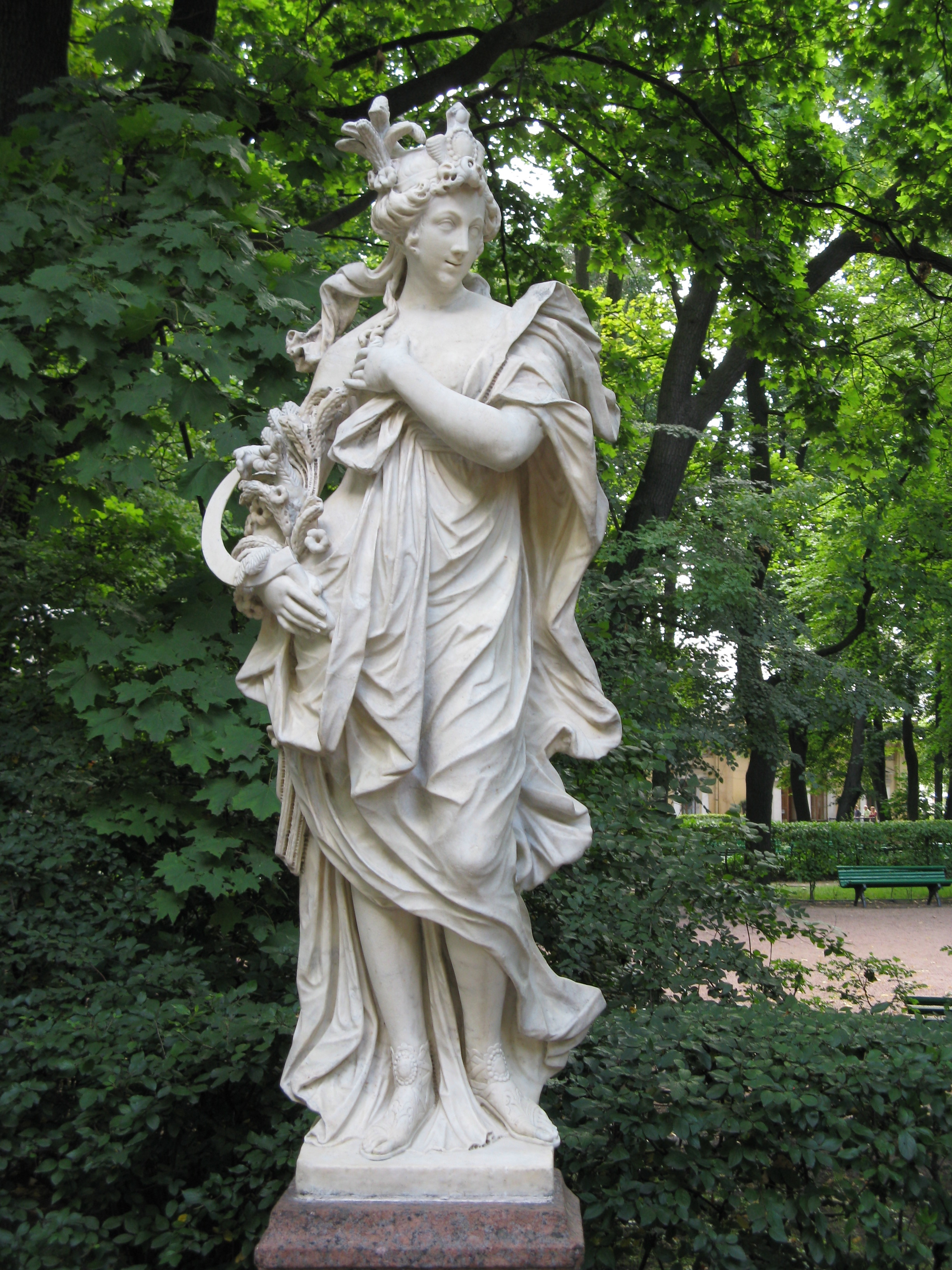
Statue of Ceres in the Summer Garden, Saint Petersburg

Thomas Quellinus (March 1661 – September 1709), also known, especially in Denmark, as Thomas Qvellinus, was a Flemish baroque sculptor. He was born in Antwerp as a member of the well-known Quellinus family of artists active in 17th century Antwerp. He worked most of his career in Copenhagen, Denmark, where he operated a workshop. He is especially known for the production of grandiose and sumptuous memorial chapels, sepulchral monuments and epitaphs, which can be found in churches throughout Denmark and northern Germany's Schleswig-Holstein area. His chapels and monuments are dramatically composed, executed in rare, differently coloured types of marble and framed by monumental architectural components.

== Early life and training ==
Thomas Quellinus was born in Antwerp to the leading Baroque sculptor Artus Quellinus II and Anna Maria Gabron, and was baptised on 17 March 1661. He trained in his father's workshop in the art of sculpture. After completing his apprenticeship with his father, he went to London, England, where he worked with his brother Artus Quellinus III. While in England he married Anna Maria Cocques (Cooques). He remained there until at least January 1688.

== Career in northern Europe ==
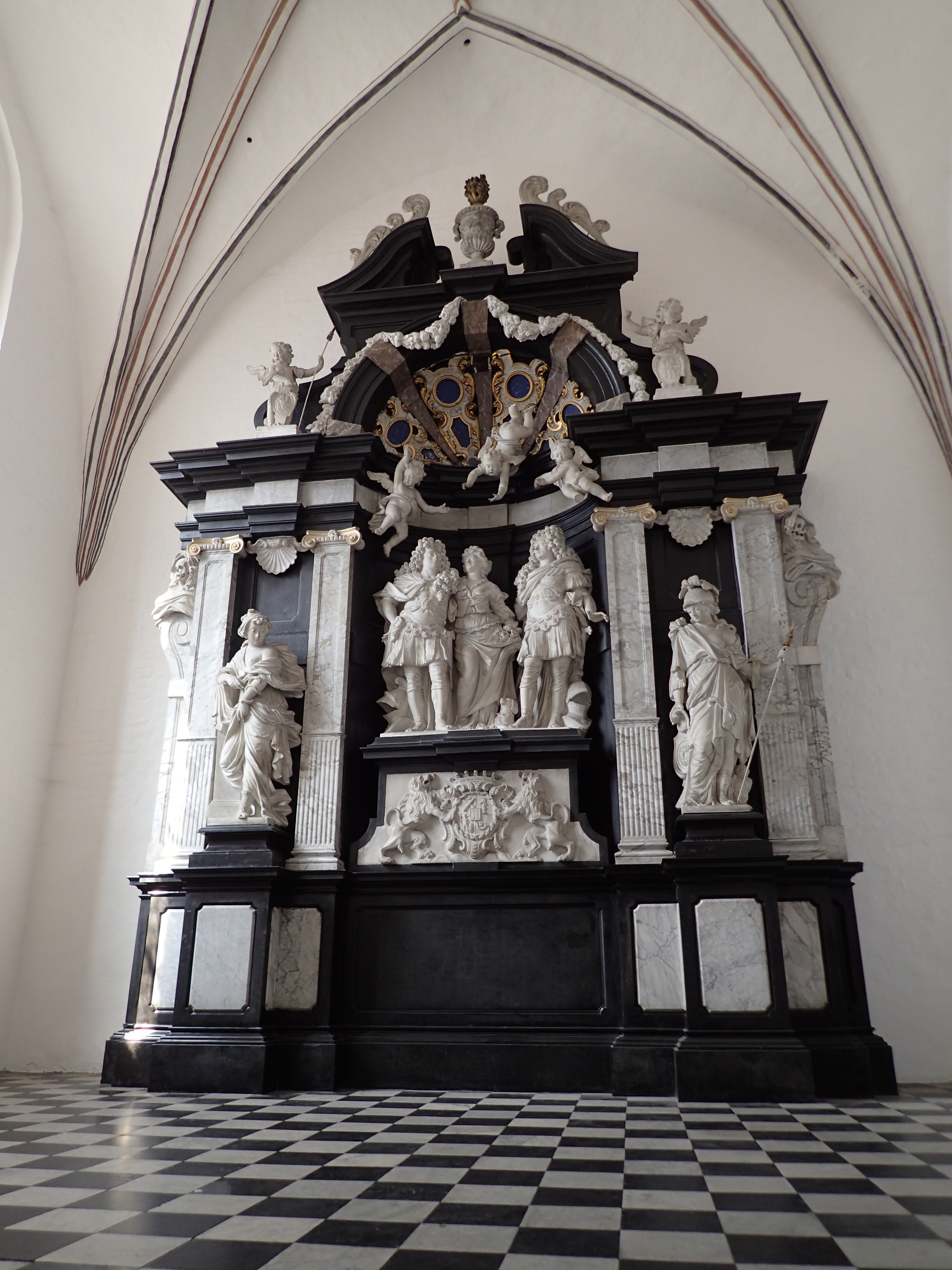
The Marselis epitaph in Aarhus Cathedral

He was already a respected artist when he came to Denmark at the end of the 1680s to oversee the numerous Scandinavian commissions of his father's workshop. He arrived in 1689 and supervised the work on the tomb designed by his father for Field Marshal Hans Schack (1609–76) in Trinity Church (Trinitatiskirke), Copenhagen.

In a short time he gained a considerable independent reputation as a sculptor in Northern Europe. The commission to create the Ulrik Frederik Gyldenløve monument in Our Lady Church (Vor Frue Kirke), Copenhagen in August 1689 was the catalyst for his extended stay and successful career in Denmark.

Due to the volume and scope of work he produced, he opened in 1689 a workshop in Lübeck, which specialized in funerary monuments for Danish and north German patrons. In his workshop he had many students, apprentices and helpers, mainly sculptors from Flanders, among them Alexander van Papenhoven, Abraham Breusegem, Emanuel Cuekelaere, Peeter Coelemans, Just Wiedewelt (father of sculptor Johannes Wiedewelt and probably Andreas Gercken. In order to simplify production he imported some partially carved pieces, especially architectural pieces, from the Southern Netherlands.

While he was very successful in obtaining private commissions, he only received few commissions from the royal court and he was never named sculptor to the royal court. Up until 1697 he lived in Aabenraa, after which he acquired residential property in Norgesgade, now known as Bredgade, in Copenhagen.

His assistants Breusegem and Cuekelaere executed in 1697 the sculptures for the altar at Our Saviour's Church (Vor Frelsers Kirke), Copenhagen after Quellinus' design.

On 6 October 1701 Quellinus was one of a group of respected artists to send a petition to King Frederick IV requesting approval for the formation of an artist society and teaching academy. The others were Hendrick Krock, Wilchen Riboldt, Jacob Coning, Otto de Willarts, and Georg Saleman — all artists in the service of the court. This was the humble beginning to the formation of the Royal Danish Academy of Art (Det Kongelige Danske Kunstakademi) many years later.

After 1701 he regularly visited Antwerp, and was in the Southern Netherlands in 1704. He received citizenship in Copenhagen as a sculptor on 12 December 1703, along with royal permission to run a commercial enterprise selling lace from Brabant.

He returned permanently to Antwerp in 1707, and became a master in the city's Guild of St Luke.

He died in Antwerp and was buried on 7 September 1709. His widow, Anna Marie, survived him, and it is believed that she continued his workshop's production for some years with a couple of assistants. She also continued until 1711 the commercial enterprise selling lace.

== Aftermath ==
Much of his work has not survived or has been partially destroyed by either fire, war or the general ravages of time. This includes the Schack tomb at Trinity Church, which originally brought Quellinus to Denmark, which was already partially destroyed in the Copenhagen Fire of 1728.

His almost seventeen years in Denmark had a significant impact on the development of Danish sculpture, and especially memorial sculpture. Many of the next generation's best sculptors were his students.

== Other works ==
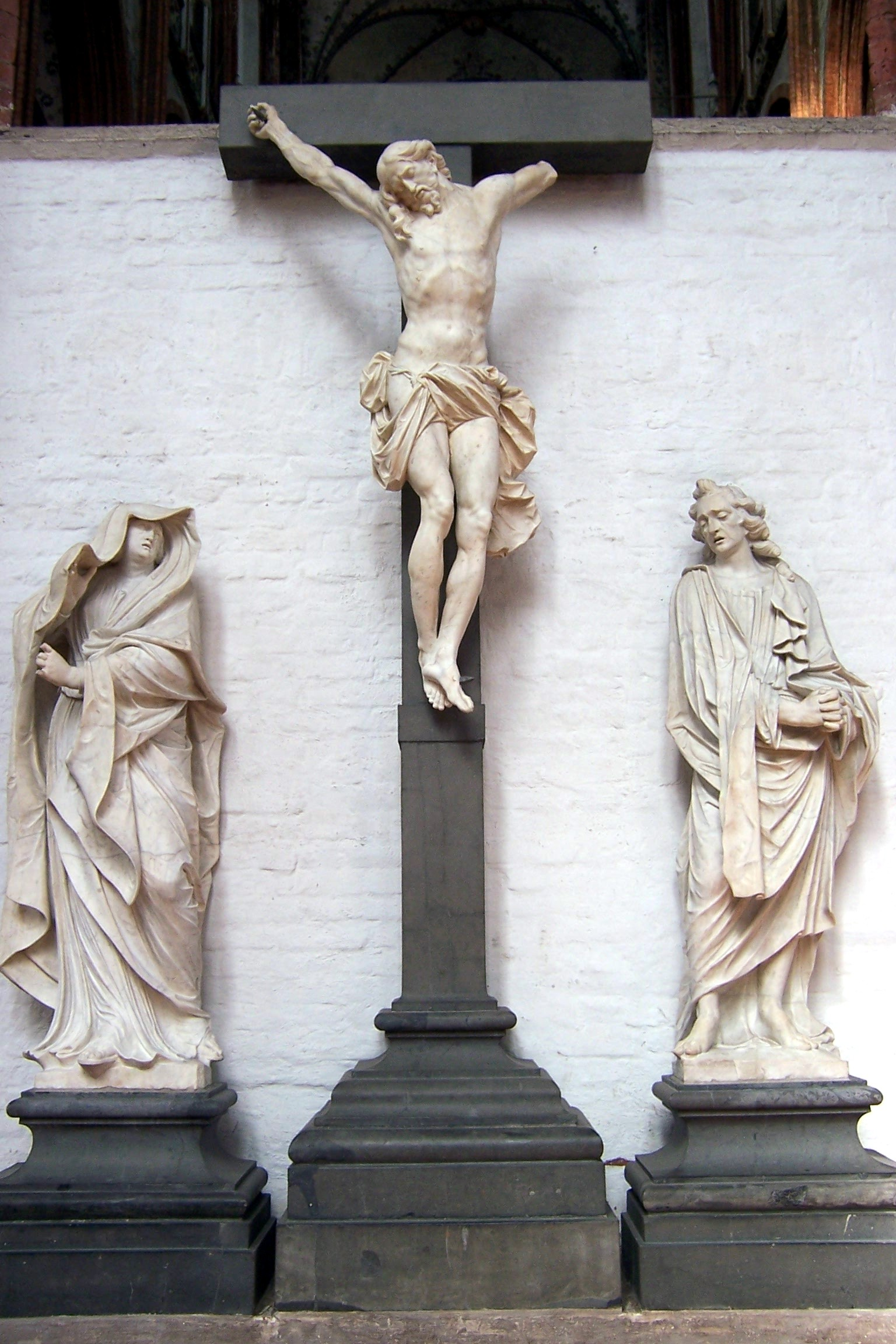
Crucifixion (fragment) of the High Altar of St. Mary's Church, Lübeck

- The baroque high altar (1697) in Lübeck's St. Mary's Church called the "Fredenhagen-altar" after its donator, Lübeck merchant Thomas Fredenhagen. The altar was destroyed during the World War II bomb raid on Lübeck, and fragments of the altar were stored.. There have been discussions, as to whether it should be rebuilt. A bust of Fredenhagen is in Lübeck's St. Annen Museum, along with the model of the altar.
- The tomb for Prince Bishop August Friedrich von Schleswig-Holstein-Gottorp, and the tomb chapel for the Danish chancellor Johann Hugo von Lente' (1640–1716) in the Lübeck Cathedral (Lübeck Dom)
- The tomb and chapel for the noble von Brockdorff family in 'Kletkamp Manor' in Nüchel Church (Kirchnüchel) near Plön in Holstein, Quellinus's last major work
- The sarcophagus for Danish Chancellor Conrad von Reventlow in the Schleswig Cathedral (Schleswig Dom)
- The memorials for Axel Urup, Ulrik Frederik Gyldenløve and Cort Adeler in Our Lady Church (Vor Frue Kirke), Copenhagen
- The memorial for Niels Rosenkrantz (d. 1676) in Nicholas Church (Nicolai Kirke),
- The memorials for Constantin Marselis-Casius-Rodstun in Aarhus Cathedral (Aarhus Domkirke), Aarhus, Denmark (1702–1704)
- The monuments for Thomas Kingo in Slangerup and on Funen
- Two of the five marble busts, those of Christian Albrecht and of Duke Frederik IV in Schleswig Cathedral are presumed, with good reason, to be the work of Quellinus
- Sculptures for the gardens at Frederiksborg Palace
- Sculptures for Christian Albrecht's Gottorp Castle
