= Artus Quellinus III =

Flemish sculptor

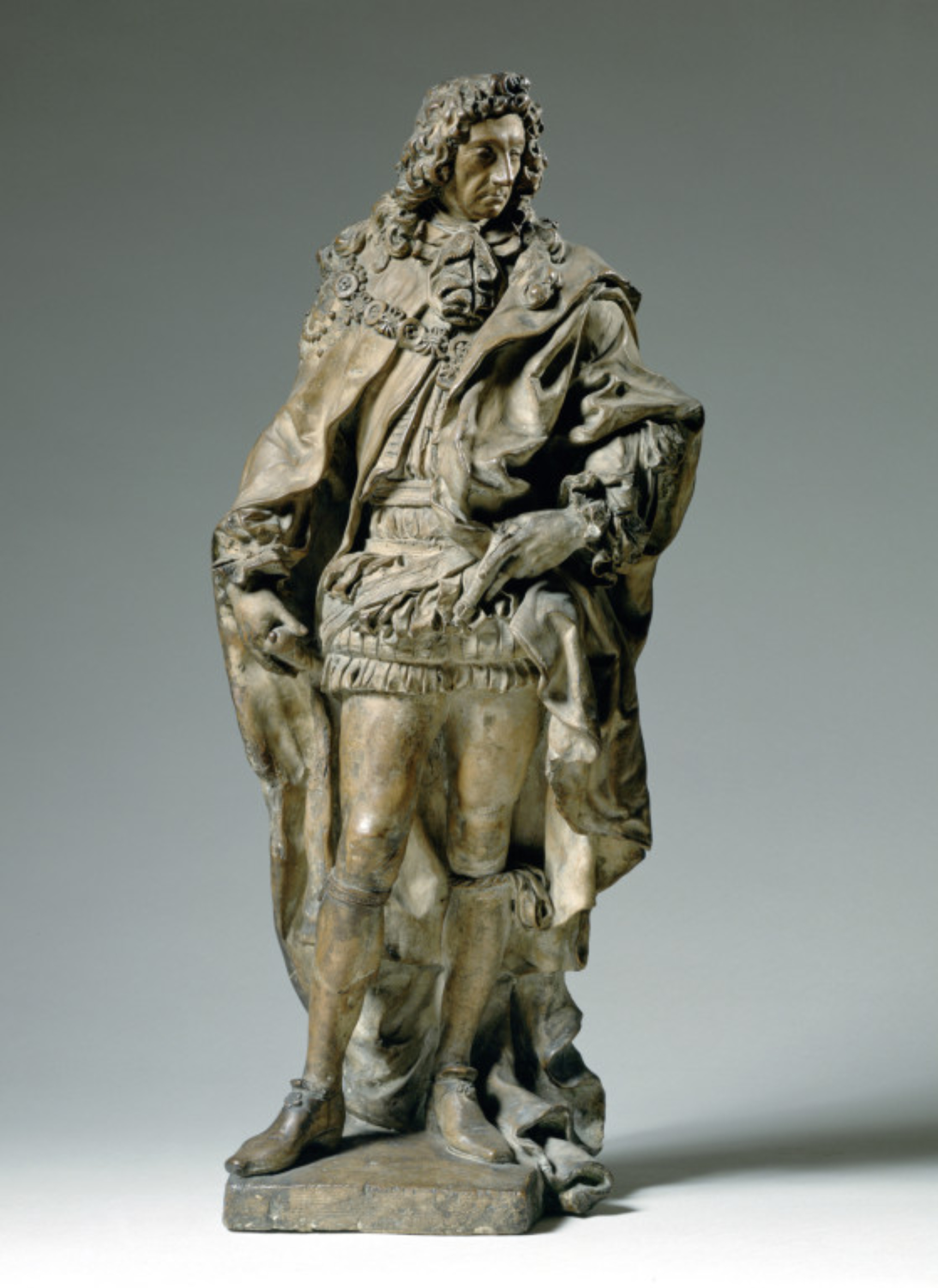
King Charles II wearing the robes of the Order of the Garter

Artus Quellinus III, known in England as Arnold Quellin (1653 – December 1686) was a Flemish sculptor who after training in Antwerp was mainly active in London. Here he worked in partnership with the English sculptor Grinling Gibbons on some commissions. Some of the works created during their partnership cannot with certainty be attributed to Quellinus or Gibbons. The drop in quality of the large-scale figurative works in the workshop of Gibbons following the early death of Quellinus has been seen as evidence of the heavy reliance on Quellinus to produce such works.

== Life ==
He was born in Antwerp, the son of Artus Quellinus II and Anna Maria Gabron. His father was a sculptor who played an important role in the evolution of Northern-European sculpture from High Baroque to Late Baroque. His mother was the sister of the painter Willem Gabron. His brothers were the sculptor Thomas Quellinus and the painter Cornelis Quellinus. He trained in his father's workshop in Antwerp.

He married Frances Siberechts, the youngest daughter of the Antwerp landscape painter Jan Siberechts. Siberechts had emigrated some time between 1672 and 1674 to London where he joined the already sizeable colony of Flemish artists. It was probably Siberechts who encouraged Quellinus III and his wife to move there as well. Quellinus is documented in England from 1679 when the architect Hugh May certified that he was to work at Windsor Castle.

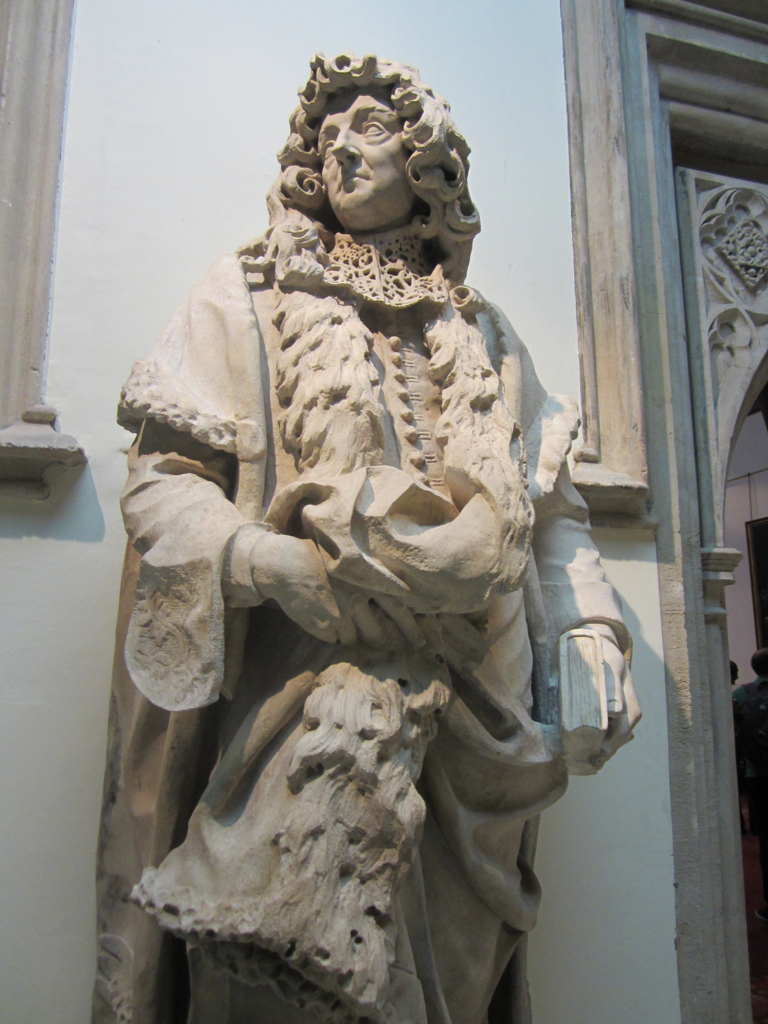
Portrait of Sir John Cutler

He worked from 1680 in partnership with the English carver and sculptor Grinling Gibbons, joining fellow Flemish artists Antoon Verhuke, John Nost, Peter van Dievoet and Laurens van der Meulen. Quellinus III and Gibbons collaborated on the altarpiece for the Roman Catholic chapel in Whitehall Palace (1685–86). After his early death, his widow married his studio assistant John Nost.

== Works ==
- Monument to Thomas Thynne in Westminster Abbey (1684)
- Roman Catholic Chapel at Whitehall with Grinling Gibbons, removed in 1694 and relocated at Hampton Court in 1696 but moved again to Westminster Abbey in 1706 and moved again in 1826 to Burnham Church in Somerset
- Statue of King Henry VI for the Worshipful Company of Armourers and Brasiers at Royal Exchange
- Statue of King Edward IV for the Worshipful Company of Ironmongers at Royal Exchange
- Statue of King Edward V for the Worshipful Company of Leathersellers at Royal Exchange
- Statue of King Henry VII for the Worshipful Company of Tallow Chandlers at Royal Exchange
- Statue of King Charles II for the Worshipful Company of Grocers at Royal Exchange
- Statue of Charles II for the Royal College of Physicians now at Guildhall (1683)
- Statue of Sir John Cutler, 1st Baronet for the Royal College of Physicians now at Guildhall (1683)
- Statue of Sir John Cutler, 1st Baronet for the Worshipful Company of Grocers (1683)
- Garden statues and ornaments for Carlton House, County Kildare

== Bibliography ==
- (in German) Artus Quellinus III.. In: Ulrich Thieme, Felix Becker in Allgemeines Lexikon der Bildenden Künstler von der Antike bis zur Gegenwart. Band 27, E. A. Seemann, Leipzig 1933
- Margaret Whinney, Sculpture in Britain 1530–1830, 1964, pp. 40, 52, 54–57, 59, 63, 93, v128.
