= Alexander van Papenhoven =

Flemish sculptor

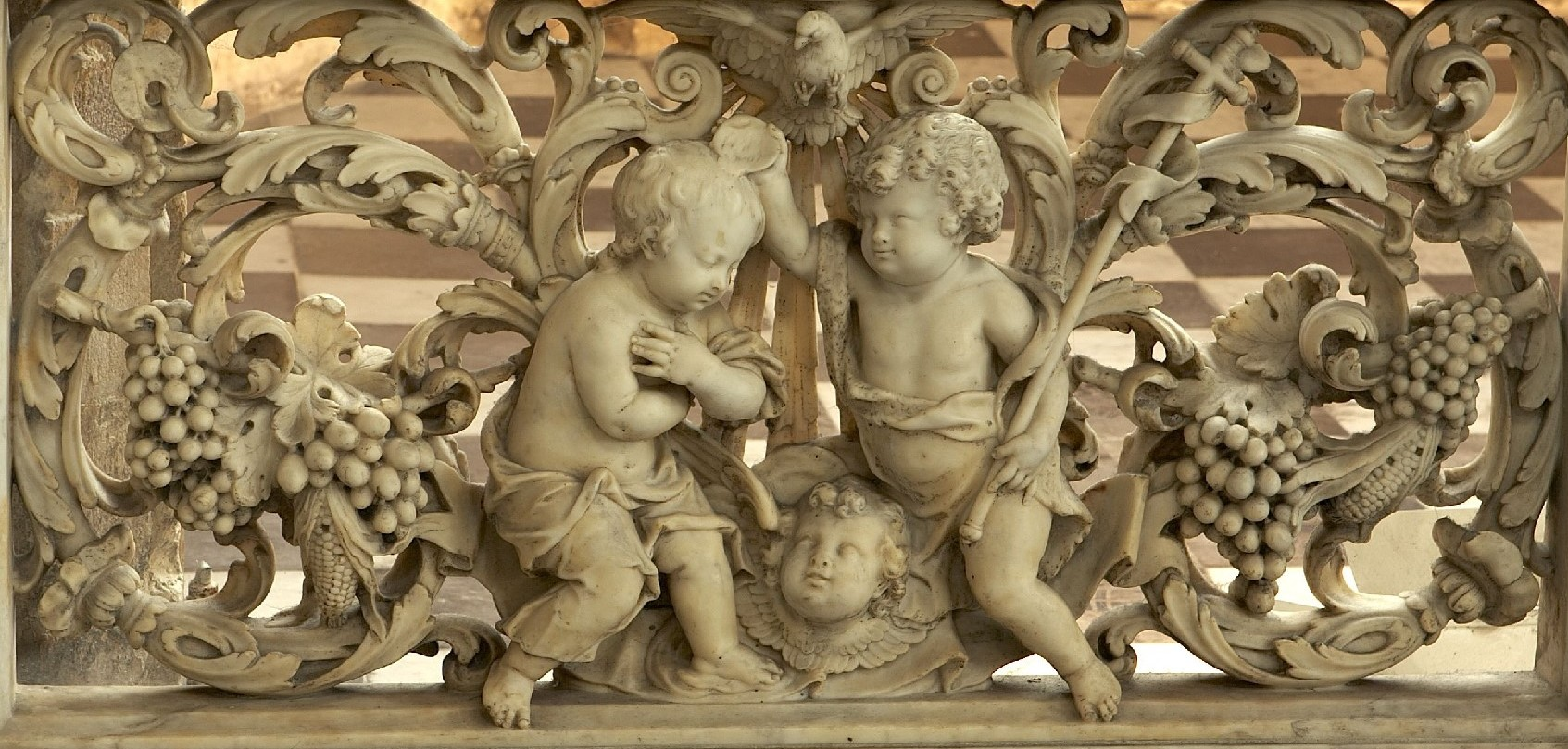
Communion bench with putti, St Peter's Church Leuven

Alexander van Papenhoven (Antwerp, 14 July 1669 – Antwerp, 15 February 1759) was a Flemish sculptor, architect and art educator, who is best known for the furniture which he made for the principal churches in Flanders. He worked mainly in Antwerp, but early in his career he was also active for some years in Denmark.

He played an active role in the administration of the Antwerp Guild of Saint Luke and the Academy of Antwerp, in an attempt to revive the arts in Antwerp. His oeuvre stands at the juncture in Flemish sculpture when the flamboyance of the High Baroque gave way to Classicism which emphasized the clarity of design.

== Life ==
Alexander van Papenhoven was born in Antwerp as the son of Cornelis and Maria Fasseur. He was baptized on 14 July 1669 in the Saint Andrew's Church of Antwerp. His father was a sculptor who specialized in puppet making. Alexander received his initial artistic training from his father. He then joined the workshop of Artus Quellinus the Younger, at the time the most prominent Flemish sculptor. He probably collaborated with his master on the high altar of the St. Mary's Church in Lübeck around 1697. In the guild year 1698–1699 he became a wijnmeester ('wine master', a free master who was the son of an existing member) of the Antwerp Guild of Saint Luke.

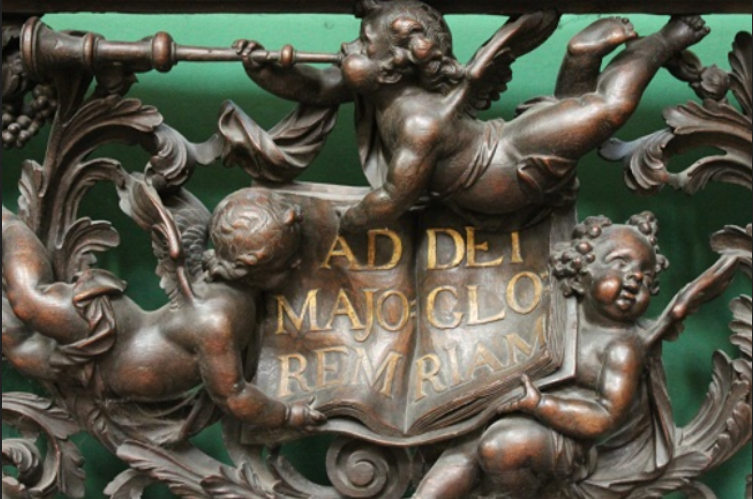
Communion bench with putti, St. Michael's Church, Leuven

On 16 November 1698 he married Maria Bruynel or Bruyneel in the Saint Georges Church in Antwerp. From circa 1700 he started working in Copenhagen where his master operated a workshop which was headed up by his master's son Thomas Quellinus. He must still have travelled back to Antwerp regularly as he appears in notarised documents in Antwerp in the years 1700 to 1707. His wife died in 1708 and was buried on 2 June 1708.

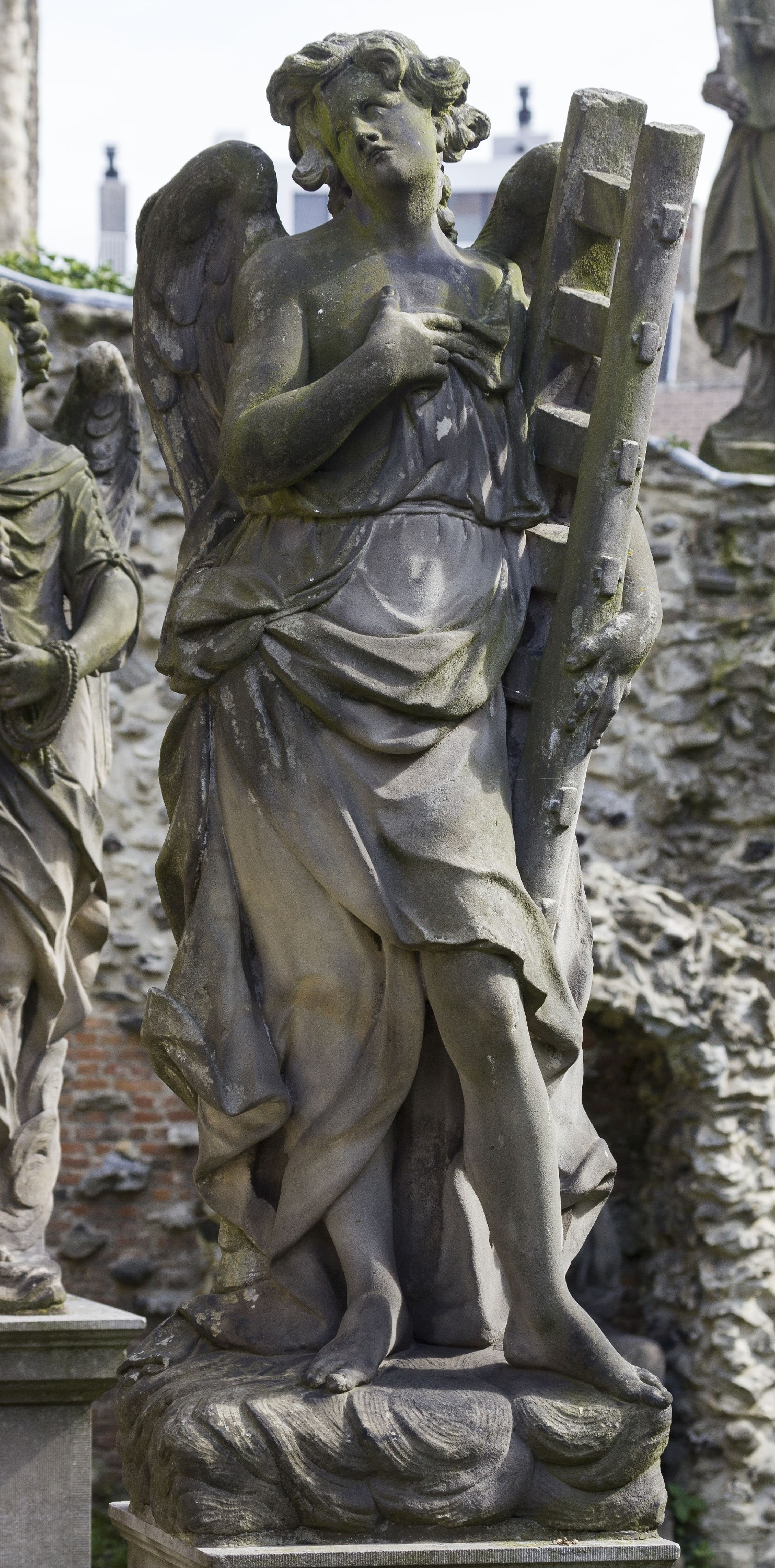
Angel with a ladder

He likely returned to Antwerp more permanently around 1707/8 as he took on pupils from the guild year 1707–08. He was in the Guild year 1715-16 dean of the Guild. In the 18th century Antwerp's standing as an artistic centre was in steep decline. The Guild experienced serious financial difficulties and the Antwerp Academy had to interrupt its art classes regularly due to lack of funds. On 2 March 1731 van Papenhoven lent 500 guilders to the Guild in Antwerp and signed a loan to the Guild on 29 July 1733. By 1640 the situation had significantly deteriorated. In order to save the Academy and art education in Antwerp Alexander van Papenhoven, Jan Pieter van Baurscheit the Younger, Pieter Balthazar Bouttats, Jacob Rottiers, Marten Jozef Geeraerts and Pieter Snyers signed on 17 August 1741 a deed, in which they undertook to administer and teach at the Academy free of charge. Van Papenhoven also became one of the directors of the Academy. The support of these artists permitted the Academy to raise funds from prominent personalities in the city which ensured its survival.

In 1742 van Papenhoven was commissioned to make a new pulpit for Antwerp Cathedral, which he finished to universal acclaim. Around this time a conflict arose between the Academy and the Guild over the right to give drawing classes, which were at the time given by the Academy but were regarded by the Guild as a potential source of income for itself. The dispute was only settled in 1749 when the Guild renounced all its rights to control the Academy and to teach the drawing classes. Van Papenhoven and others were at the same time officially affirmed by the city administration as director-teachers of the Academy.

Van Papenhoven trained many pupils, the best known of whom was Gaspar van der Hagen who had a successful career in London where he worked in the workshop of Flemish emigree sculptor John Michael Rysbrack. Another pupil of his who became a successful sculptor was Alexander Franciscus Schobbens, who was his godson. Other pupils include Peeter Overlaet, Augustinus op de Laye, Jacobus Brunel, Joannes-Franciscus Allefelt (Alevelt), Jan Baptist van den Her(d)t, Andreas Schuyf, Philippus Delvout, Ignatius Frans Verellen and Arnoldus-Johannes van den Bos.

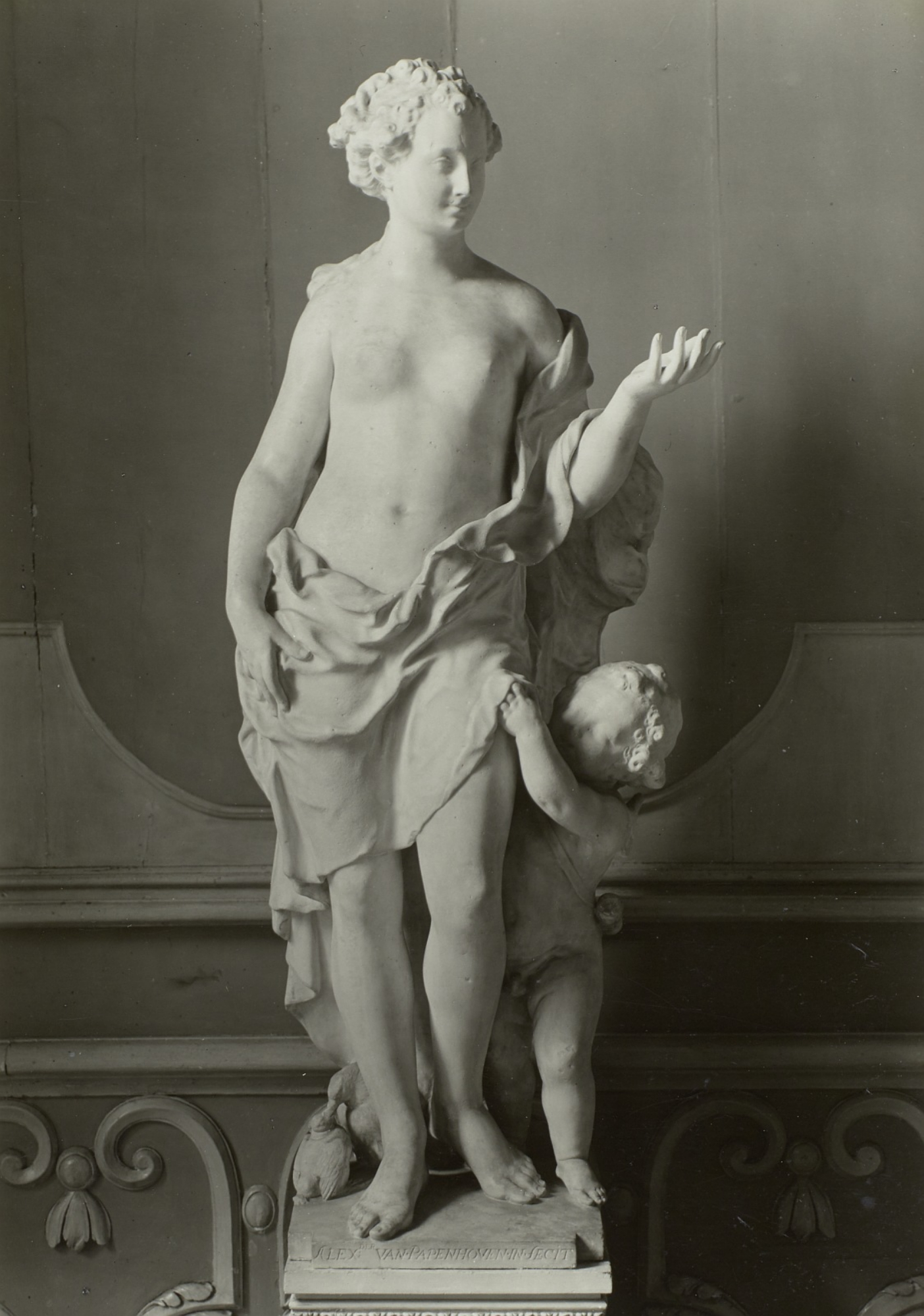
Venus and Amor

He died on 15 February 1759 in Antwerp.

== Works ==
Van Papenhoven was a versatile sculptor who worked in many materials including marble, wood and stucco. He created mainly church furniture, decorative architectural elements and statues. A number of his works were lost during the French occupation of the Austrian Netherlands following the French Revolution when many churches were forced to close by the occupiers and the church furniture was sold off. His work stands at the juncture in Flemish sculpture when the flamboyance of the High Baroque gave way to Classicism which was more concerned with clarity of design.

Papenhoven completed many commissions in Antwerp including a wooden prie-dieu in Antwerp Cathedral and various statues of saints, biblical figures and angels in the outdoor Calvary at St. Paul's Church, Antwerp. A terracotta modello of one of these statutes is in the collection of Royal Museums of Fine Arts of Belgium in Brussels. He also created marble communion benches for two churches in Leuven. In 1711 he executed the high altar in the Church of our Lady in Wuustwezel after a design by Pieter Scheemaeckers.

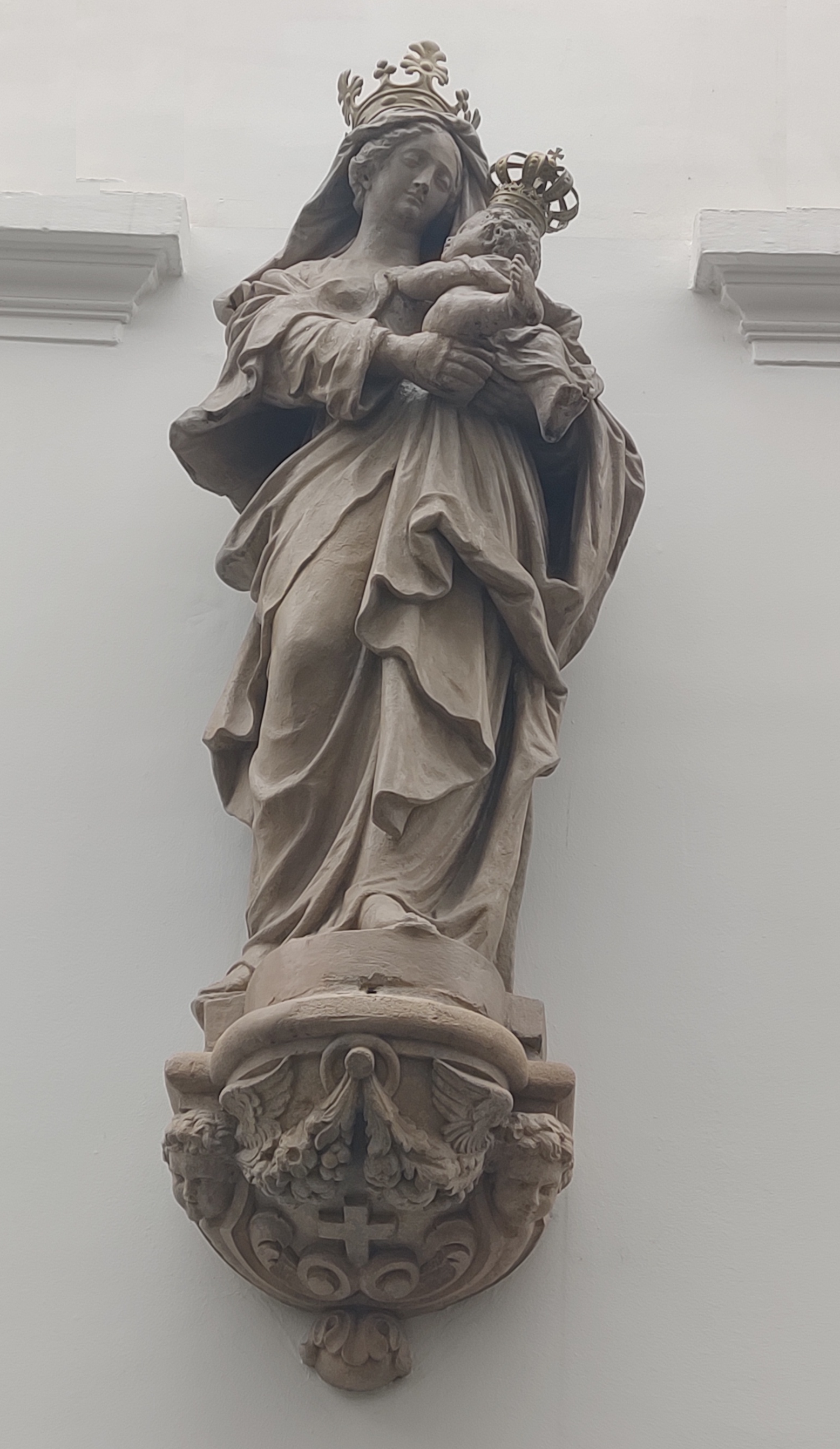
Virgin with child

It was believed in the past that van Papenhoven worked on the decoration of the Palace of Sanssouci built between 1745 and 1747 for Frederick the Great in Potsdam. A white marble statue of Amor and Cupid signed by him was once in the garden of Sanssouci in Potsdam. It was originally commissioned by William III of England around 1700 and was therefore not linked to Sanssouci. Its role was initially to serve as a garden statue. It was much admired by his contemporaries. In his collection of poems entitled Der Frühling und andere Gedichte (Spring and Other Poems) published in 1749, the German poet Ewald Christian von Kleist dedicated two poems to the work. One of the poems is titled Über die Statüe der Venus an die sich Amor schmiegt ('On the statue of Venus up against whom Amor is nestled'). The statue is now located at Oranienburg near Berlin.

Van Papenhoven sculpted a number of statues of the Virgin Mary that were attached to the facades of houses in Antwerp. An example is tVirgin with child now located at Markgravestraat 17 in Antwerp. It was originally located at the corner of Lombardenstraat and Lombardenvest in Antwerp. The statue shows a swaggeringly draped Virgin holding the child Jesus on her left arm. Both the Virgin and Child are crowned. The console is decorated with garlands and two winged angel heads. It was the work he made as the proof to be admitted as a master of the Guild of Saint Luke in 1698.
