= Randy Borum =

American forensic psychologist and intelligence expert

- Education: James Madison University, BA in psychology, 1987; Florida Institute of Technology, MS in psychology, 1991; Florida Institute of Technology, Psy.D. in clinical psychology, 1992
- Occupations: Professor and coordinator of strategy and intelligence studies
- Employer: University of South Florida

Randy Borum is a professor and coordinator of strategy and intelligence studies in the school of information at the University of South Florida and has taught at USF since 1999. He is author/coauthor of approximately 160 professional publications, has worked with three Directors of National Intelligence (DNI) on the Intelligence Science Board (ISB), served on the Defense Science Board Task Force on Understanding Human Dynamics, and is an instructor with the Bureau of Justice Assistance (BJA) State and Local Anti-Terrorism Training (SLATT) Programs for Investigations and Intelligence.

He is a board-certified forensic psychologist, worked as a senior consultant to the U.S. Secret Service, and he has taught at the FBI Academy, Federal Law Enforcement Training Centers (FLETC); JFK Special Warfare Center and School; Joint Special Operations University; the CIA; and the U.S. Army Intelligence Center and School. He serves as an advisor to the FBI's Behavioral Analysis Unit, National Center for the Analysis of Violent Crime, FLETC Behavioral Science Division, and is listed on the United Nations’ Roster of Experts in Terrorism. He is the senior editor of the peer-reviewed Journal of Strategic Security.

== Education ==
Borum earned a Bachelor of Arts in psychology degree from James Madison University, Harrisonburg, Virginia, in 1987, followed by a Master of Science degree in psychology from the Florida Institute of Technology, Melbourne, Florida in 1991 and then a Doctor of Psychology in clinical psychology from Florida Institute of Technology in 1992. He was a postdoctoral fellow in forensic psychology at the University of Massachusetts Medical Center Law-Psychiatry program in 1993. In 1997 he was awarded an NIMH Research Fellowship in Mental Health Services, Systems, and Policy Research from the National Institute of Mental Health.

== Career ==
In 1985, Borum was a cadet at James Madison University Police Department in Virginia and then a seasonal police officer at Ocean City Police Department in Ocean City, Maryland. He subsequently worked as a counselor and trainer for Listening Ear Services in Harrisonburg, Virginia; was a counselor for Tidewater Psychiatric Institute in Norfolk, Virginia; and was an outpatient therapist for Circles of Care in Melbourne, Florida. He then returned to law enforcement and was a police instructor for the Brevard County Law Enforcement Academy and with the Palm Bay Police Department in Palm Bay, Florida, while he worked on his practica at Florida Institute of Technology.

Next he was a psychology intern at the James A. Haley V.A. Medical Center in Tampa and was a fellow in forensic psychology at the University of Massachusetts Medical Center Law & Psychiatry Program. Following that he was chief psychologist and forensic coordinator for John Umstead Hospital, Adult Admissions Unit in Butner, North Carolina, and then a research fellow for the UNC-Duke Post-doctoral Training Program in Mental Health Services and Systems Research.

Borum began his career in academia at Duke University Medical Center, where he was assistant professor of medical psychology, and, at Duke's school of medicine, where he was adjunct assistant professor of medical psychology. In 1999 he joined the University of South Florida. At USF his roles have been those of senior research scientist for the James and Jennifer Harrell Center for the Study of Domestic Violence, courtesy professor for the department of criminology, associate professor for the College of Public Health, associate professor for the Louis de la Parte Florida Mental Health Institute (FMHI), professor for the college of public health, professor for FMHI, faculty affiliate for the Center for Strategic and Diplomatic Studies, academic coordinator for cybersecurity at USF, and professor for the school of information.

== Awards and honors ==
In 1996 Borum earned the Saleem Shah Award for Early Career Contributions to Practice in Psychology and Law. Following that the Florida Institute of Technology School of Psychology conferred to him its Outstanding Alumnus Award. .

== Books ==
- Ridgely, S., Borum, R., & Petrila, J. (2001). The effectiveness of involuntary outpatient treatment. Santa Monica, CA: RAND.
- Borum, R. (2004). Psychology of Terrorism. Tampa, FL: University of South Florida. (Monograph).
- Borum, R., Bartel, P., Forth, A. (2006). Manual for the Structured Assessment of Violence Risk in Youth (SAVRY). Odessa, FL: Psychological Assessment Resources.
- Borum, R. & Verhaagen, D. (2006). Assessing and managing violence risk in juveniles. New York: Guilford Press.
- Borum, R. (2010). The Science of Interpersonal Trust. McLean, Va: The MITRE Corporation/IARPA.
- Qatar International Academy for Security Studies (Principal Author) (2010). Risk reduction for countering violent extremism. Doha, Qatar: QIASS.
- Borum, R., Fein, R. & Vossekuil, B (2011). Risk Assessment for Terrorism: A Practitioner Oriented Review. Arc Project Working Paper: UK-US.
- Borum, R., Fein, R. & Vossekuil, B (2011). Lone Offender Terrorism: A Practitioner Oriented Review. Arc Project Working Paper: UK-US.
- Borum, R., Fein, R. & Vossekuil, B (2012). Psychology of Foreign Fighters: A Practitioner Oriented Review. Arc Project Working Paper: UK-US.
- Borum, R., Fein, R. & Vossekuil, B (2013). Abnormal Psychology & Terrorism: Advanced Literature Review. Arc Project Working Paper: UK-US
