= Dirck Wijntrack =

Dutch Golden Age painter

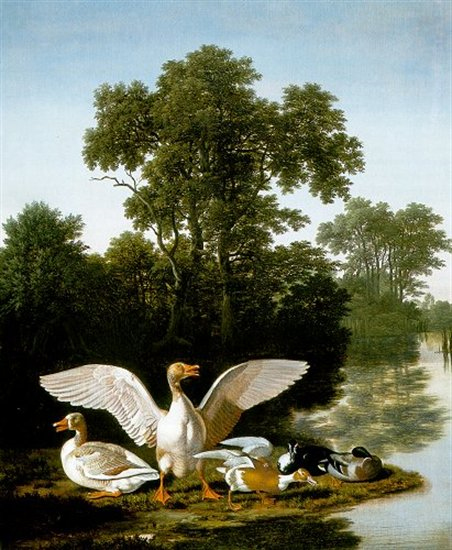
Birds in a landscape. collaboration with Joris van der Haagen, Bredius Museum

Dirck Wijntrack, or Wyntrack (1615, Heusden – 1678, The Hague), was a Dutch Golden Age painter.

== Biography ==
According to the RKD he is known for landscapes and farm scenes with animals and worked with Jan Wijnants and Joris van der Haagen collaborating on landscape paintings. He married in Rotterdam in 1646 and worked in Gouda during the years 1651-1655. He worked in Schoonhoven in the year 1655, and moved to The Hague in 1657 where he stayed.

He married a sister-in-law of Ludolph de Jongh (1616 - 1697) Painter, sheriff of Hillegersberg (since 1665).
