= Gaspar van der Hagen =

Flemish sculptor active in England in 18th century

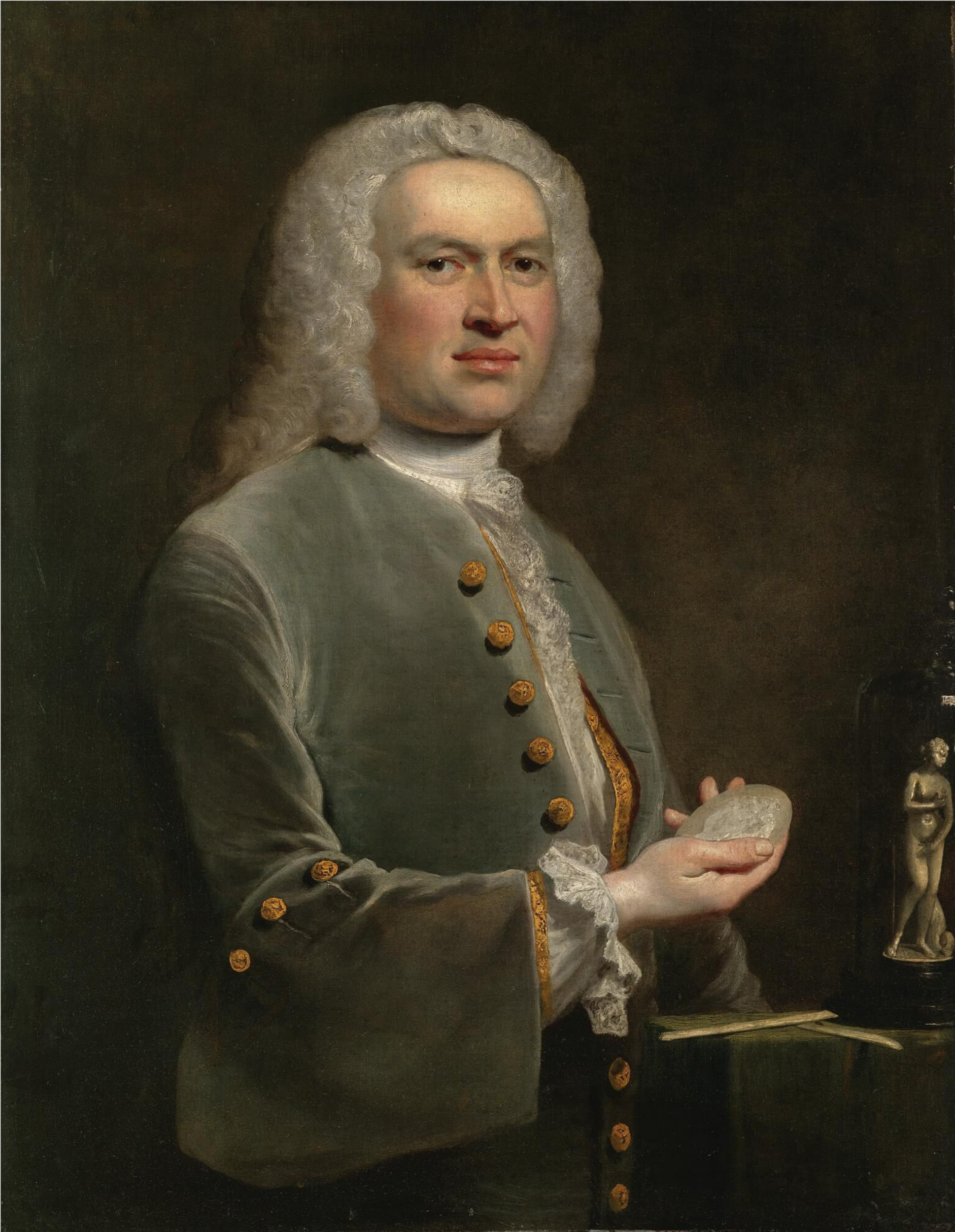
Gaspar van der Hagen by Joseph Highmore

Gaspar van der Hagen or Gaspar Vanderhagen (circa 1700, Antwerp - 1769, York) was a Flemish sculptor and ivory carver. It is possible that he should be identified with the ivory carver who signied his works with the monogram G. VDR. He is known only for his work created during his stay in England where he was an assistant in the workshop of the prominent Flemish sculptor John Michael Rysbrack. He is known for his portrait busts and portrait medals carved in ivory.

== Life ==
Details about his life are scarce. He was likely born in Antwerp as he is known to have had sisters who lived in Antwerp and was recorded first in Antwerp. The year of his birth is not known but it is likely it was some time around 1700 as he was registered as a pupil in the Antwerp Guild of Saint Luke in the guild year 1711–1712. In the Guild records his name is spelled Gaspaer Verhaghen and Gaspar Verhagen and it is noted that he is studying sculpture ('belthouwen' or 'beltsnyden') with Alexander van Papenhoven. His master was a prominent sculptor and architect in Antwerp. Van der Hagen may have continued to work in the workshop of van Papenhoven after his apprenticeship ended as he was never registered as a master in the Antwerp Guild.

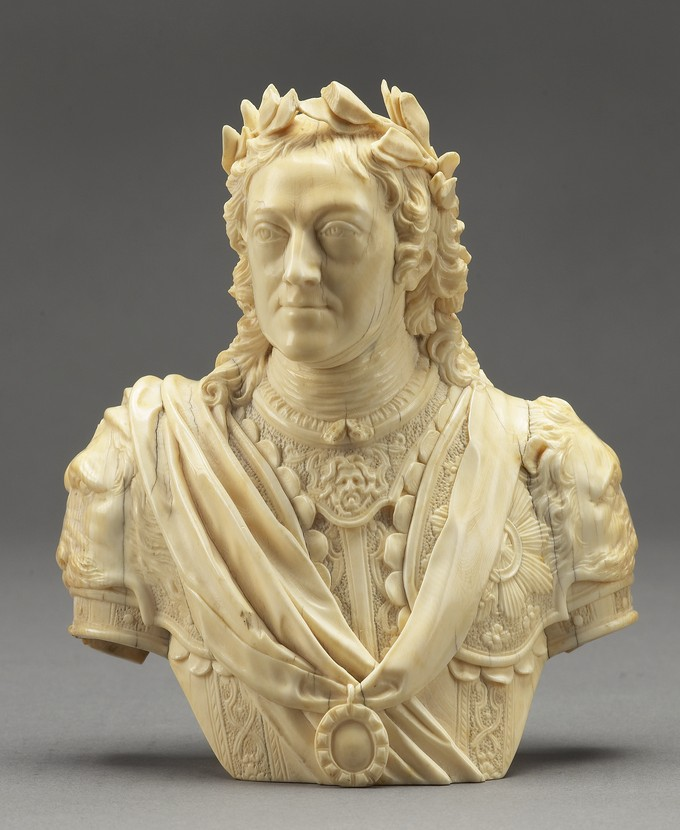
Portrait bust of King George II

He left Flanders for England probably around 1730. If he is to be identified with the monogrammist G. VDR, he is recorded in England from 1734. He became closely linked with John Michael Rysbrack, another Flemish sculptor from Antwerp who was working in London and was at the time the leading portrait and monument sculptor in England.

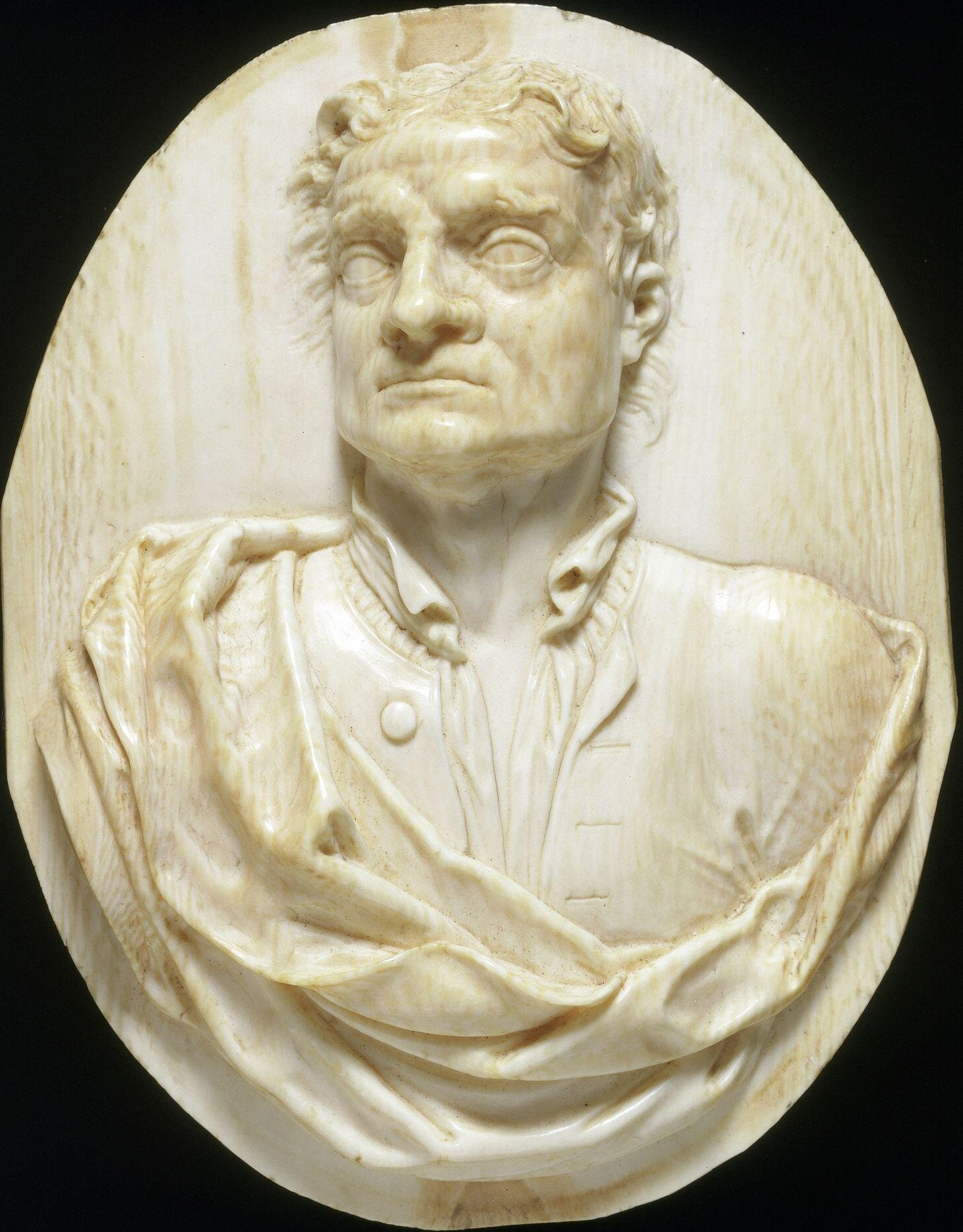
Portrait relief of Sir Isaac Newton

He was recorded in London in 1744 when the Daily Advertiser carried a notice about "Mess. Claessens and Ven Hagen, at Mr. Rysbrack's in Vere Street, near Oxford Chapel". Claessens was Rysbrack's foreman and died on 4 December 1749. The Mr. Claessens referred to in the notice was likely the Peeter (Peter) Claessens who was registered as a pupil of Joannes (Jan) Veremans in the records of the Antwerp Guild of Saint Luke in the guild year 1711–1712, the same year in which van der Hagen was registered as a pupil in the Guild records. Claessens had moved to London probably before 1743 and became one of the foremen at Rysbrack's workshop, a position he held until his death on 4 December 1749. Notices placed by van der Hagen and Claessens in the Daily Advertiser in 1743 and 1744 invited the public to subscribe for copies cast in plaster of three statuettes of 17th century Flemish artists Rubens, Anthony van Dyck and François Duquesnoy. These plasters were to be cast after the original terracottas by Rysbrack which were in the collection of the painter Joseph van Aken, another Flemish resident in London.

In 1747, the English diarist George Vertue noted that "Mr Vander Hagen. Sculptor works for Mr Rysbrack. has done several heads portraits in Ivory.—very well. but not meeting with propper encouragement did not continue". Vertue's notes show that he held van der Hagen in high regard.

Van der Hagen continued to reside with his master on Vere Street, Oxford Road until 1766. Four of his works were sold at the Rysbrack collection auction organized by Langford on 1 February 1767. One of the auctioned works was a Sacrifice to Hercules, which is likely the work which was auctioned by Christie's on 13 June 2002 and is now in the collection of the Yale Center for British Art. The work was based on a terracotta model by Rysbrack, which in turn was inspired by a relief on the Arch of Constantine in Rome.

Van der Hagen left the workshop of Rysbrack and moved to York in 1766. He seems to have spent his final years in poverty as in 1768 he appealed to the Society of Artists for support. He received four guineas from the Society. He died in York in 1769. As he was a lifelong bachelor, his sisters Isabella and Catherine (Harman), both living in Antwerp, administered his estate. They organized a sale of his works on 17 April 1771. The catalogue of the sale referred to van der Hagen as the 'principal assistant to the late Mr. Rysbrack,' and listed for sale 'several fine heads and figures in ivory, basso relievos in marble, books of prints, &c'.

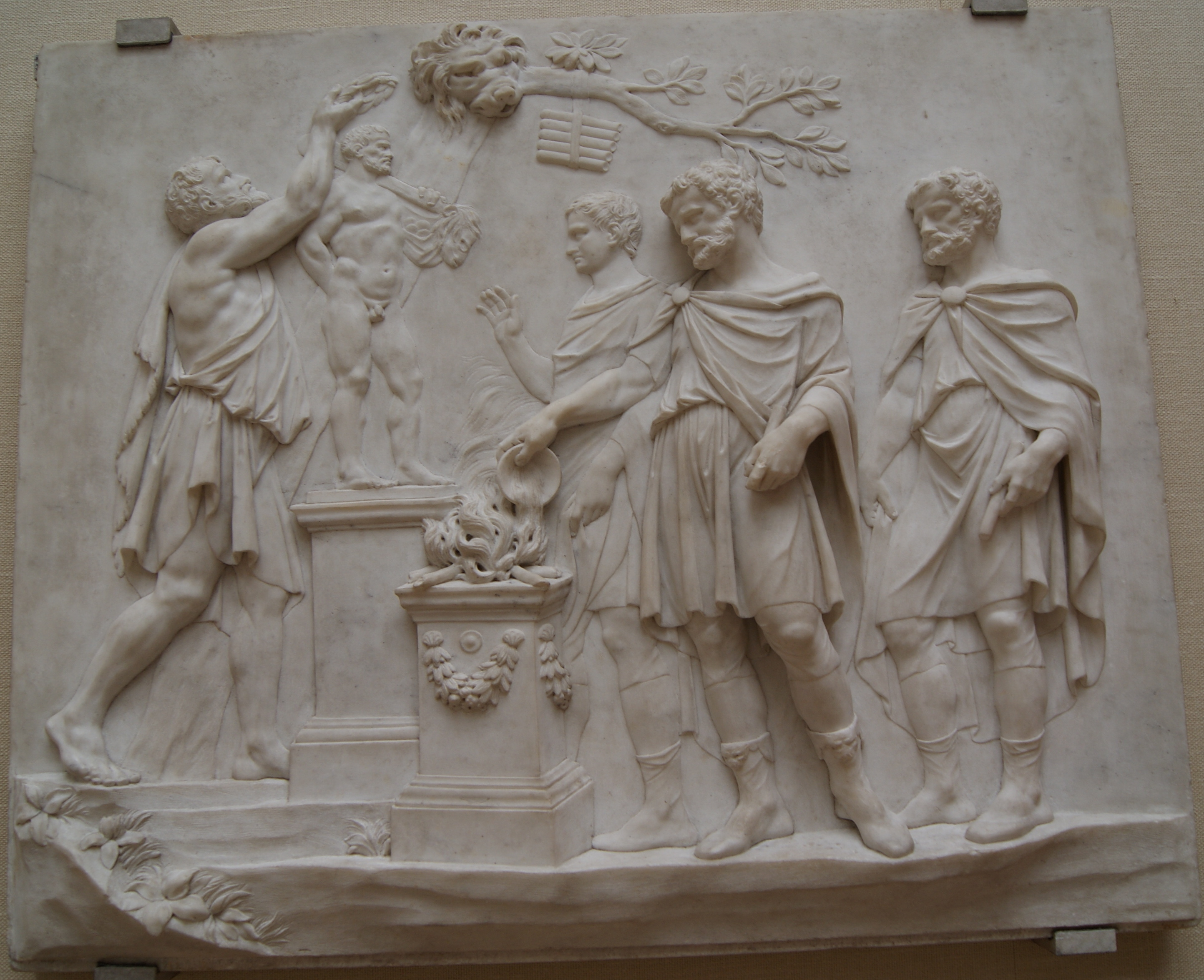
Sacrifice to Hercules

== Work ==
Van der Hagen was a sculptor in marble as well as an ivory carver. Most of his known work is attributed to him based on stylistic grounds as they are mostly unsigned. Some art historians have attributed small ivory portraits monogrammed 'VDHN', 'VAM', 'GVD', 'GVR' and 'G VDR' to van der Hagen. In the past some of his works have been erroneously attributed to an Alexander van der Hagen.

A majority of his oeuvre is constituted by oval portrait reliefs carved in ivory. The sitters are usually portrayed as busts in profile, or presented in three-quarter view. These small-scale works were mostly carved after full-size busts made by Rysbrack and occasionally other artists such as Louis-François Roubiliac, an important competitor of Rysbrack. The ivory reliefs represent contemporary personalities as well as British Worthies, such as Newton, Milton, Shakespeare and Locke. In his time, ivory works were often displayed in cabinets, but also served as portable mementos, that people could keep with them when they travelled.

Examples are the two almost identical relief portraits of Sir Isaac Newton, one of which is in the Walters Arts Gallery, Baltimore and the other in the Victoria and Albert Museum, London. There are two more versions, one in the Royal Society and the other in Kings College Library, Cambridge. The basis for the Newton portrait is probably the so-called Conduit marble bust of Newton and the terracotta bust in the Wren library, Trinity College, Cambridge of 1739, both created by Rysbrack.

His small bust of the Duke of Cumberland (Victoria and Albert Museum, London) is a very secure, detailed and textured work made after a marble sculpture by Rybrack. It was made by van der Hagen around 1767. It is likely the ivory bust exhibited at the Free Society of Artists in 1767.
