= Willem Gabron =

Flemish painter (1619-1678)

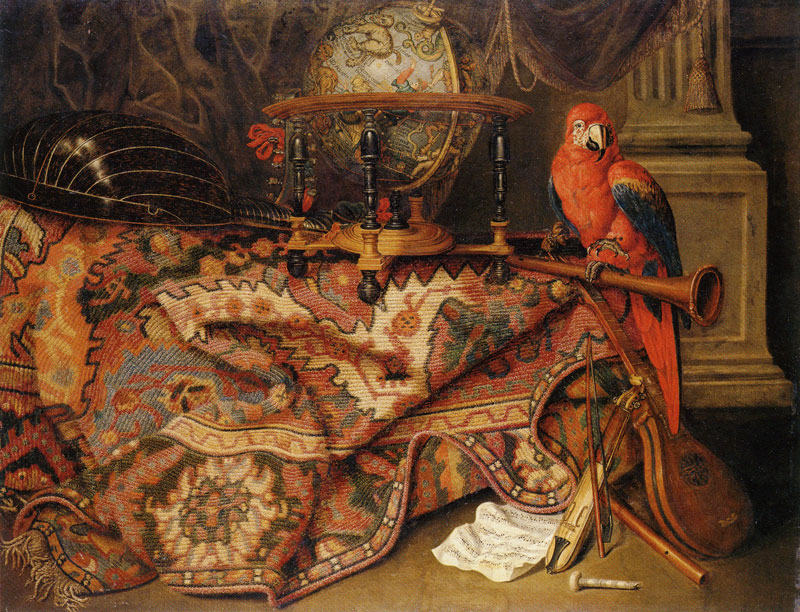
Still Life with Turkish Carpet and a Parrot

Willem Gabron or Guiliam Gabron (1619, Antwerp – 2 August 1678, Antwerp), was a Flemish Baroque still life painter, who worked in a wide range of genres including fruit pieces, vanitas still lifes, flower still lifes, game pieces and breakfast pieces. Gabron was also a gifted animalier and often included living animals in his still life scenes. He initially worked in a monochrome style but developed a more colourful palette after a long stay in Italy.

== Life ==
Willem Gabron was born in Antwerp where he was baptised on op 28 October 1619. His family had an artistic pedigree. His grandfather Jan Gabron was an art dealer and auctioneer. His father, also called Willem, was a frame and panel maker who had registered as a master at the Antwerp Guild of St. Luke in 1610 and was also active as a decorative painter. Willem Gabron's mother was Magdalena Cossiers, the sister of the history painter Jan Cossiers.

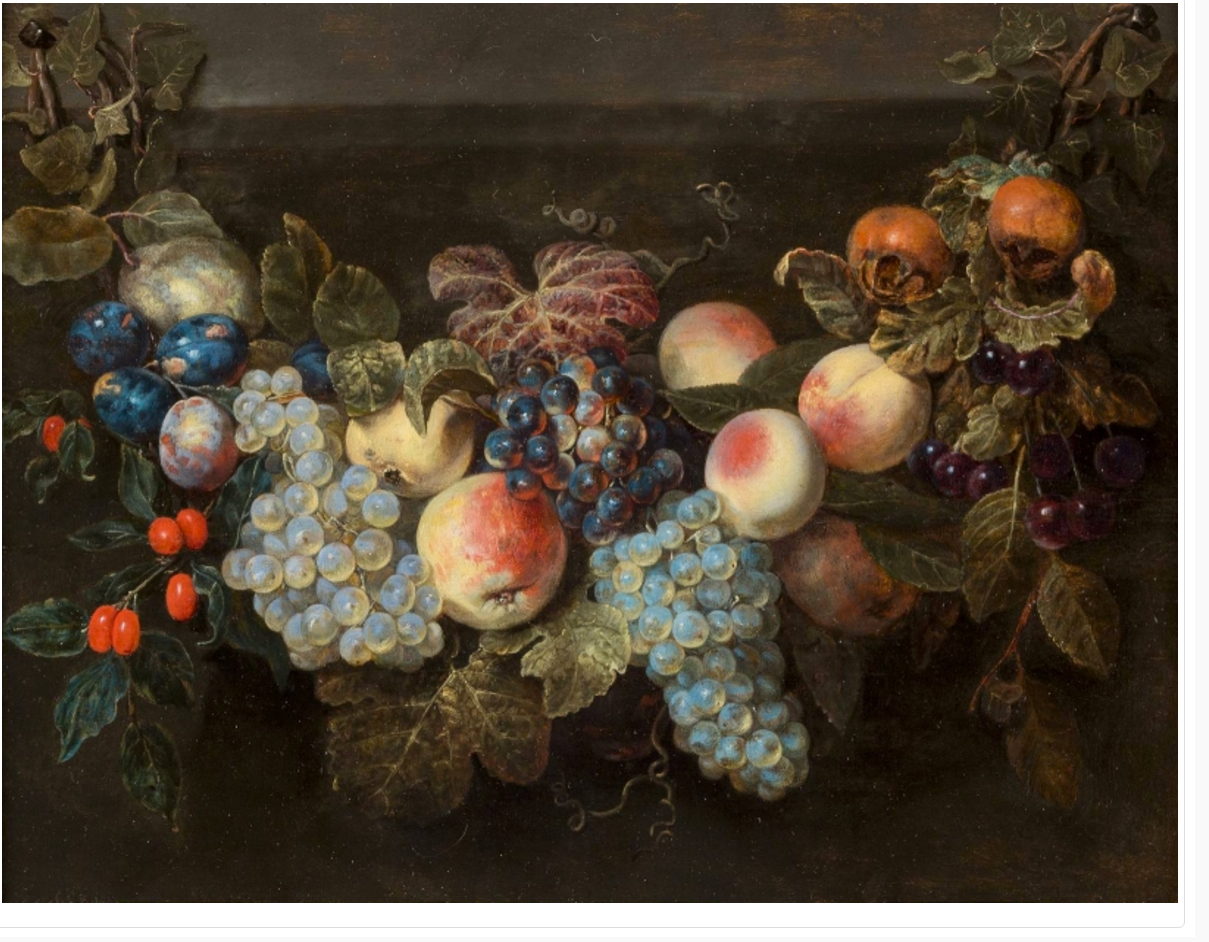
Garland of fruit

It is not clear with whom he studied but it is likely his father was his teacher. He was already active from 1634. He was first registered in the Antwerp Guild of St. Luke as a 'wijnmeester' (i.e. son of a master of the Guild) in the guild year 1640–41, along with his younger brother Antoon. His sister Anna Maria married the Antwerp sculptor Artus Quellinus the Younger.

Gabron travelled to Rome, at the latest by 1646. Here he became a member of the Bentvueghels, an association of mainly Dutch and Flemish artists working in Rome. It was customary for the Bentvueghels to adopt an appealing nickname, the so-called 'bent name'. Gabron was given the bent name Toetssteen, which means 'touchstone'.

He returned to Antwerp before 1660 where he remained active until his death. He never married and he left his estate to his brother Antoon and his sister Anna Maria, who had been widowed by that time.

== Work ==
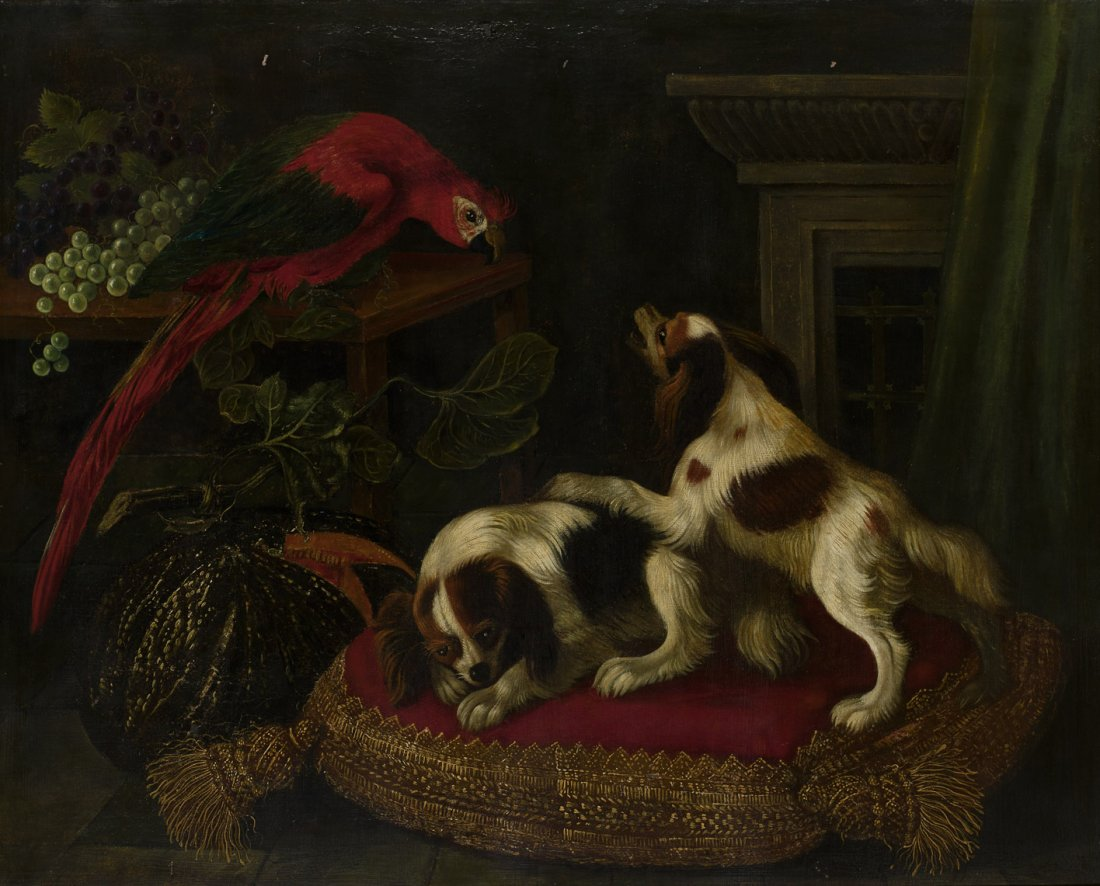
Still life with macaws and two King Charles spaniels

Only a few of his works have been preserved. The artist was a specialist still life painter known for his game pieces, flower and fruit pieces and vanitas paintings. His still lifes were very sought after. He excelled in the painting of fruit and flowers as well as in the realist representation of golden, silver and ivory objects. Gabron was also a gifted animalier and often included living animals in his still life scenes.

In the early part of his career in Antwerp, Gabron was close to the Haarlem tradition, which is characterised by its monochrome palet. After his trip to Italy, especially in Rome, his works took on a more colourful imagery.

Like other still life painters of his generation, his work was influenced by the leading Dutch still life painter Jan Davidsz. de Heem who worked in Antwerp for a long period. Willem Gabron responded to de Heem's style in his own idiosyncratic manner rather than imitating him.

The work of Daniel Seghers was also an important inspiration for Gabron. Daniel Seghers was one of the earliest practitioners of the genre of garland paintings. These paintings typically show a flower garland around a devotional image or portrait. Gabron's Adoration of the Holy Sacrament (At Tajan on 16 December 2014, lot 4) is an allegory of the holy communion represented by two flower garlands surrounding the Host and wine over which hover two putti. The work expands on Seghers' earlier garland paintings.
