= Joris van der Haagen =

Dutch Golden Age painter

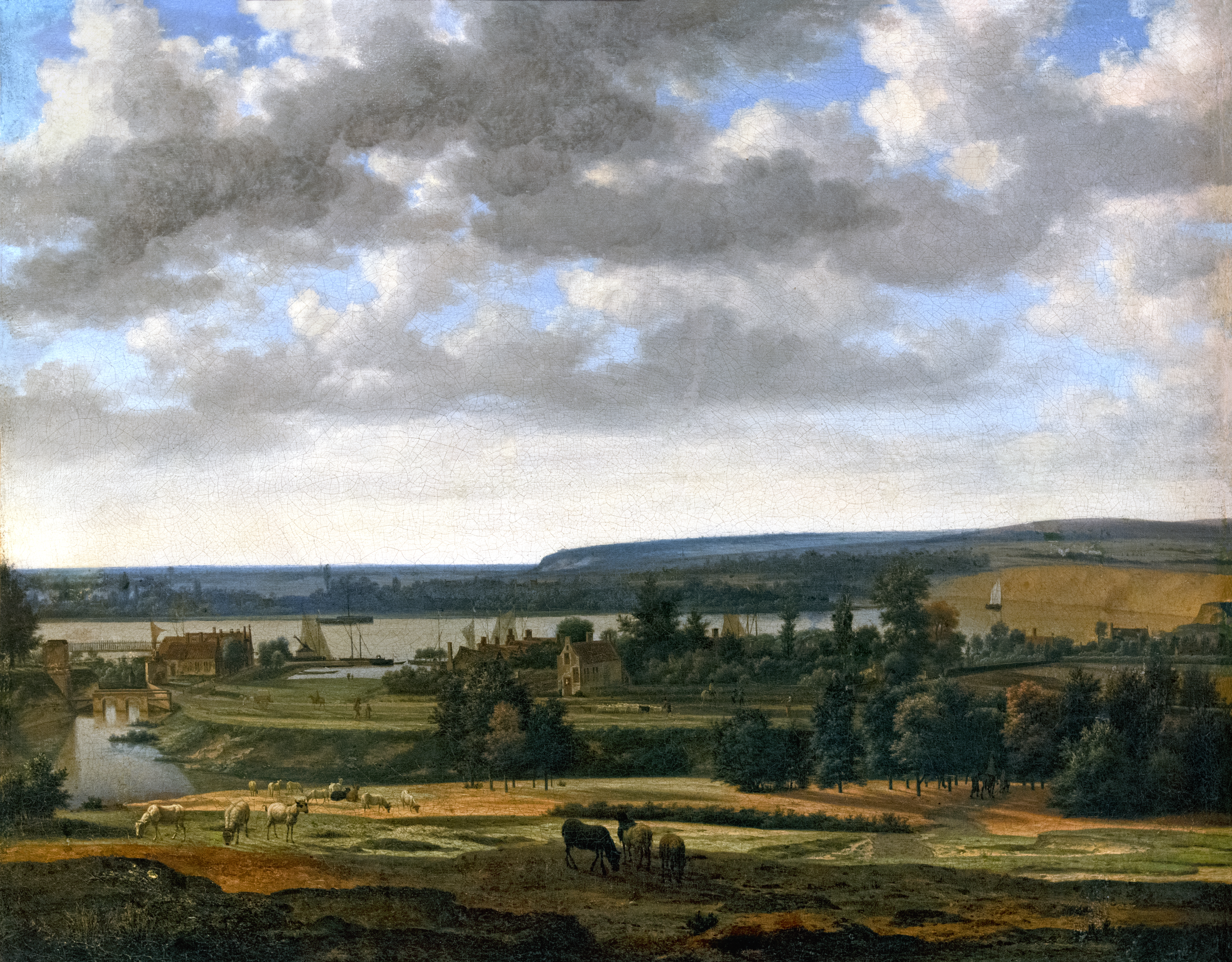
Surroundings of Arnhem Fine Arts of Carcassonne

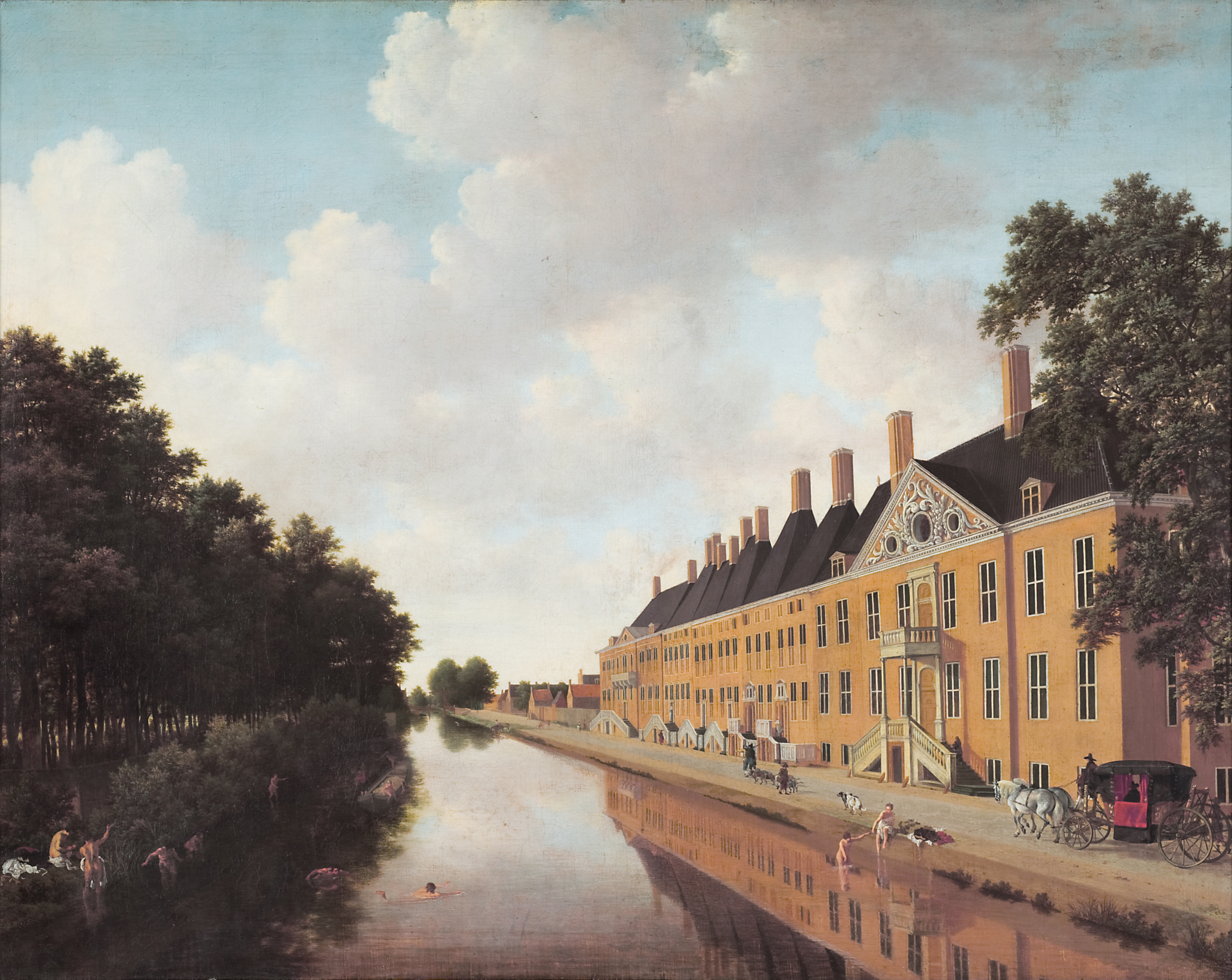
View of the Prinsessegracht in The Hague, where the Confrerie Pictura was situated by Van der Haagen. The figures were painted by Ludolf Leendertsz de Jongh.

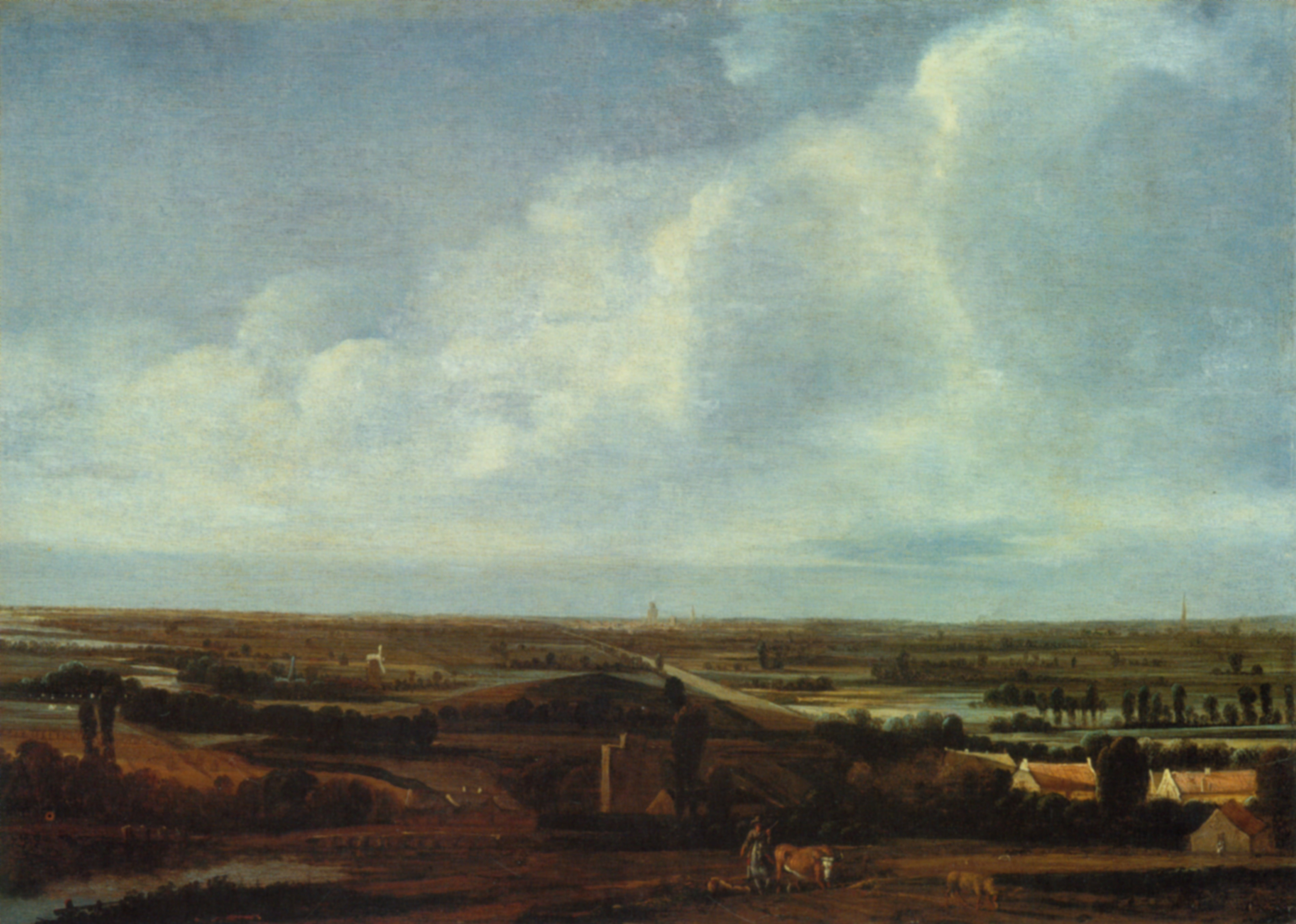
Joris van der Haagen, Flat landscape with town in the distance, oak wood, 38,1 x 52,9 cm, Gemäldegalerie, Berlin

Joris Abrahamsz. van der Haagen (c. 1615 – 23 May 1669 (buried)) was a Dutch Golden Age painter specialized in landscapes.

== Biography ==
It is unclear where Joris van der Haagen was born, either in Arnhem or Dordrecht, but archival evidence shows that he started his drawing career in Arnhem. He probably learned to paint from his father, the painter Abraham van der Haagen. When his father died he moved in 1639 to the Hague, where he joined the Guild of St. Luke in 1643. A year later he became honorary citizen of The Hague. In 1656 he was one of the founding members of the Confrerie Pictura, which was located on the Princessegracht in the Hague. The painting he made of the Princessegracht at this time probably shows the original building, which has since been renovated beyond recognition. He is buried at The Hague.

== Legacy ==
He is known for his landscapes, and especially his views of various cities in the eastern part of the Netherlands. Sometimes he collaborated with other painters, who painted figures in his landscapes. Evidence shows he worked with Dirck Wyntrack, Paulus Potter, Ludolf Leendertsz de Jongh, Jan Wijnants and Nicolaes Berchem.

According to Houbraken he used blue ash to make the color green, and this had faded by 1715, when he saw his paintings in Amsterdam. Despite this problem, the paintings were sold for high prices. He has few paintings in few British institutions the exception being Derby Art Gallery who have a landscape which is "after" him.
