= Vanderhaeghe =

Vanderhaeghe is a surname. Notable people with the surname include:

- Guy Vanderhaeghe (born 1951), Canadian writer
- Margaret Elizabeth Vanderhaeghe (1950–2012), Canadian artist
- Yves Vanderhaeghe (born 1970), Belgian footballer and manager
