= Abraham van der Haagen =

Dutch painter

Abraham van der Haagen (1587 - 1639) was a Dutch Golden Age painter and engraver, of whose work nothing remains.

He was born in Dordrecht the son of Joris van der Hagen (also named Pauw), who had fled Antwerp before 1575, and Adriaenken Martens. He was baptized in Dordrecht on 26 April 1587, where he joined the St. Lucas Guild in 1608. He married Sophia Ottendr. van der Laen on 18 December 1611. By 1618 he was living in Arnhem, where he died in February 1639. His son, Joris van der Haagen, also became a painter and probably apprenticed with his father in Arnhem.
