= Verhaeghe =

Verhaeghe may refer to:

- Bart Verhaeghe (born 1965), Belgian footballer and club president
- Carter Verhaeghe (born 1995), Canadian ice hockey centre for the Florida Panthers
- Marie Tamarelle-Verhaeghe (born 1962), French Democratic Movement politician
- Paul Verhaeghe (born 1955), Belgian clinical psychologist and psychoanalyst
- Verhaeghe Brewery, Belgian brewery

== See also ==
- Paul Verhaeghen (born 1965), Belgian novelist
- Paul Verhaegh (born 1983), Dutch footballer
- Verhaegen, different form of the surname
