= David A. Verhaagen =

American Psychologist

David A. Verhaagen (born June 21, 1964) is an American psychologist and the author or co-author of eleven books, including Therapy with Young Men, Assessing and Managing Violence Risk in Juveniles, Sexually Aggressive Youth, Parenting the Millennial Generation, and Working with the Wealthy and Well Known. As a licensed psychologist who earned his Ph.D. in psychology from the University of North Carolina at Chapel Hill, Verhaagen previously served as clinical director for three mental health agencies. He is a founding partner of Southeast Psych Nashville, a large psychology practice in Nashville, TN. He is board-certified in Child and Adolescent Clinical Psychology by the American Board of Professional Psychology and is a Fellow of both The American Board of Clinical Psychology and The American Board of Clinical Child and Adolescent Psychology. He has been cited several times in USA Today and Newsweek. He is an Adjunct Assistant Professor at Vanderbilt University with the Ph.D. Clinical Psychology program.

== Writing and publishing ==
As an author, Verhaagen has written on a range of topics, including parenting, violence risk, and therapeutic processes. His writings are unified by a focus on the positive, resiliency-based aspects of psychology. Verhaagen has individually authored four books. Published in 2010,Therapy with Young Men: 16-24 Year Olds in Treatment (Routledge) provides a model of therapy for working with young men in their late teens and early twenties. The book draws from the influences of Motivational Interviewing, Cognitive-Behavioral Therapy, and Positive Psychology. His book, Parenting the Millennial Generation: Guiding Our Children Born Between 1982 and 2000 (2005, Greenwood Publishing), offers research-based parenting strategies for building resilience in children. As with most of his writing, the book focuses on how to build on each individual's unique strengths. His book, "How White Evangelicals Think: The Psychology of White Conservative Christians," offers insights about evangelicals from the perspective of both psychological research and as an evangelical insider.. His most recent book is "Working with the Wealthy and Well Known: Evidence-Based Guidance for Treatment Plans and Strategies".

Verhaagen has also co-authored six books, including Assessing and Managing Violence Risk in Juveniles with Dr. Randy Borum, (2006, Guilford Press). He also co-authored Sexually Aggressive Youth: A Guide to Comprehensive Residential Treatment (2001, Praeger Press) with Tim Lemmond, M.A. With Lemmond, he also co-wrote the chapter, “Successful Transitions of Sexually Aggressive Youth from Secure Residential Settings to Less Secure Community Settings,” published in On Transitions from Group Care: Homeward Bound in 2003..

Verhaagen contributed the opening chapter entitled, “Seven Keys to Developing Your Dream Non-Managed Care Practice” to Earning a Living Outside of Managed Mental Health Care (2010, APA Books). He also contributed a chapter to Breaking Barriers in Counseling Men: Insights and Innovations (2013, Routledge) He has also written chapters for The Walking Dead Psychology and Game of Thrones Psychology, both edited by Dr. Travis Langley.
