= Rijsbrack =

Rysbrack, Rijsbrack or Rijsbraeck is a Flemish surname. Notable people with the surname include:

- Pieter Rijsbraeck (1655–1729), Flemish painter
- John Michael Rysbrack (1694–1770), Flemish sculptor working in Britain, son of Pieter Rijsbraeck
- Pieter Andreas Rijsbrack (1685–1748), Flemish painter, son of Pieter Rijsbraeck
- Gerard Rijsbrack (1696–1773), Flemish painter, son of Pieter Rijsbraeck
