= Philippe de Buyster =

Flemish-French sculptor (1595–1688)

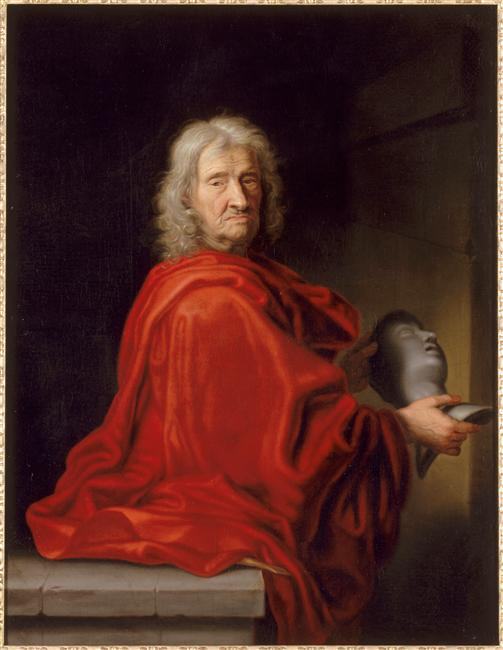
- Born: 1595
- Died: 1688
- Occupation: Sculptor

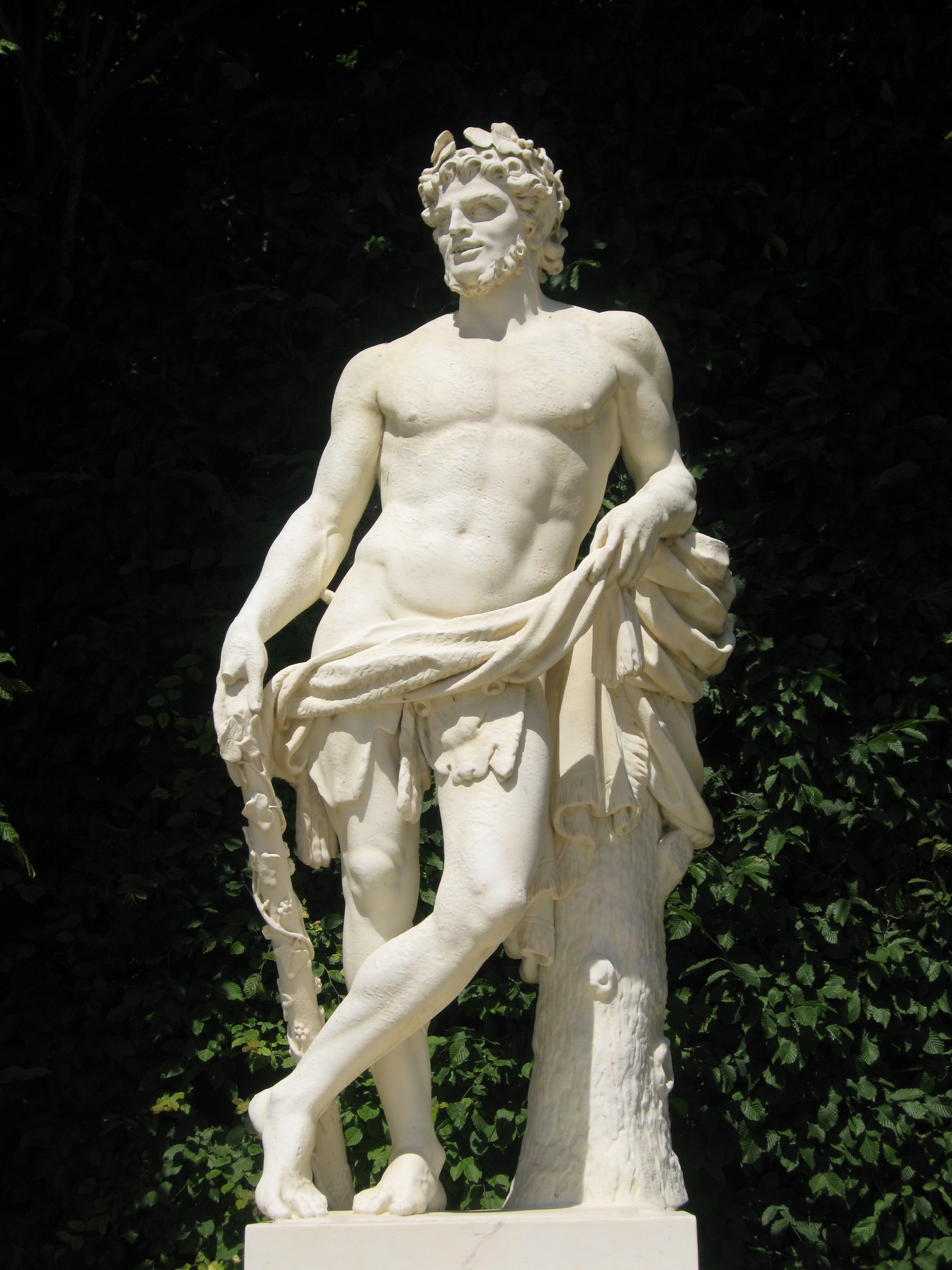
Le Poème satyrique, Versailles

Philippe de Buyster (1595 – 1688) was a Flemish-French sculptor.

== Biography ==
He was born in Antwerp and became a pupil of Gillis van Papenhoven. He moved to Paris in about 1622, where in 1632 he became 'Sculpteur ordinaire du Roi' and lived to a great age. He worked on numerous funeral monuments and decorations for the Royal court, often collaborating with Jacques Sarazin. He is known for mythological subjects. His widow remarried the painter Pieter Rijsbraeck. Their son John later became a sculptor, while another son, Pieter, became a painter. He died in 1688, in Paris, aged 92 or 93.
