= Peter Rysbrack =

Peter Rysbrack can refer to:

- Pieter Rijsbraeck (1655–1729), a Flemish painter
- Pieter Andreas Rijsbrack (1685 or 1690–1748), a Flemish painter and son of Pieter Rijsbraeck
