= Thuner =

Frisian god of thunder

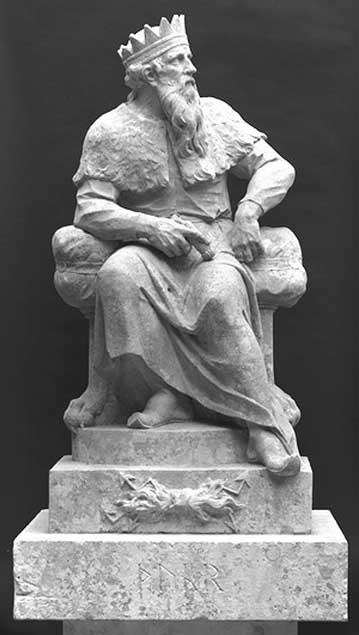
Thuner, about 1728–1730, John Michael Rysbrack V&A Museum no. A.10-1985

Thuner is the Frisian god of thunder and oldest son of Weda (in the Scandinavian mythology his name is Thor).

== Limestone figure ==
Thuner is an imposing limestone figure carved by John Michael Rysbrack (1693-1770). Thuner, the god of thunder, is one of the seven Saxon gods, each representing a day of the week. It was carved circa 1730 for Richard Temple, 1st Viscount Cobham (1675-1749) for his Stowe Gardens. On the base of the sculpture, Thuner's name is carved in runes beneath a thunderbolt. Originally the statues were set around an altar in an open grove, known as the Saxon Temple at Stowe; later they were placed in Stowe's Gothic Temple of Liberty. They formed part of an important group of buildings and statuary erected by Lord Cobham during the 1730s, which embodied a political programme championing Whig beliefs in historic British liberty.

Rysbrack was one of the most important sculptors working Britain at this time. A native of the Netherlands, he came over to England in about 1720, and soon established himself as a sculptor of monuments, portraits and busts. The Saxon gods, however, are unique in his work; neither are similar figures known by any other sculptors.

== Bibliography ==
- Jackson, Anna, ed. (2001). V&A: A Hundred Highlights. V&A Publications.
