= Cornelis Vermeulen =

Flemish printmaker

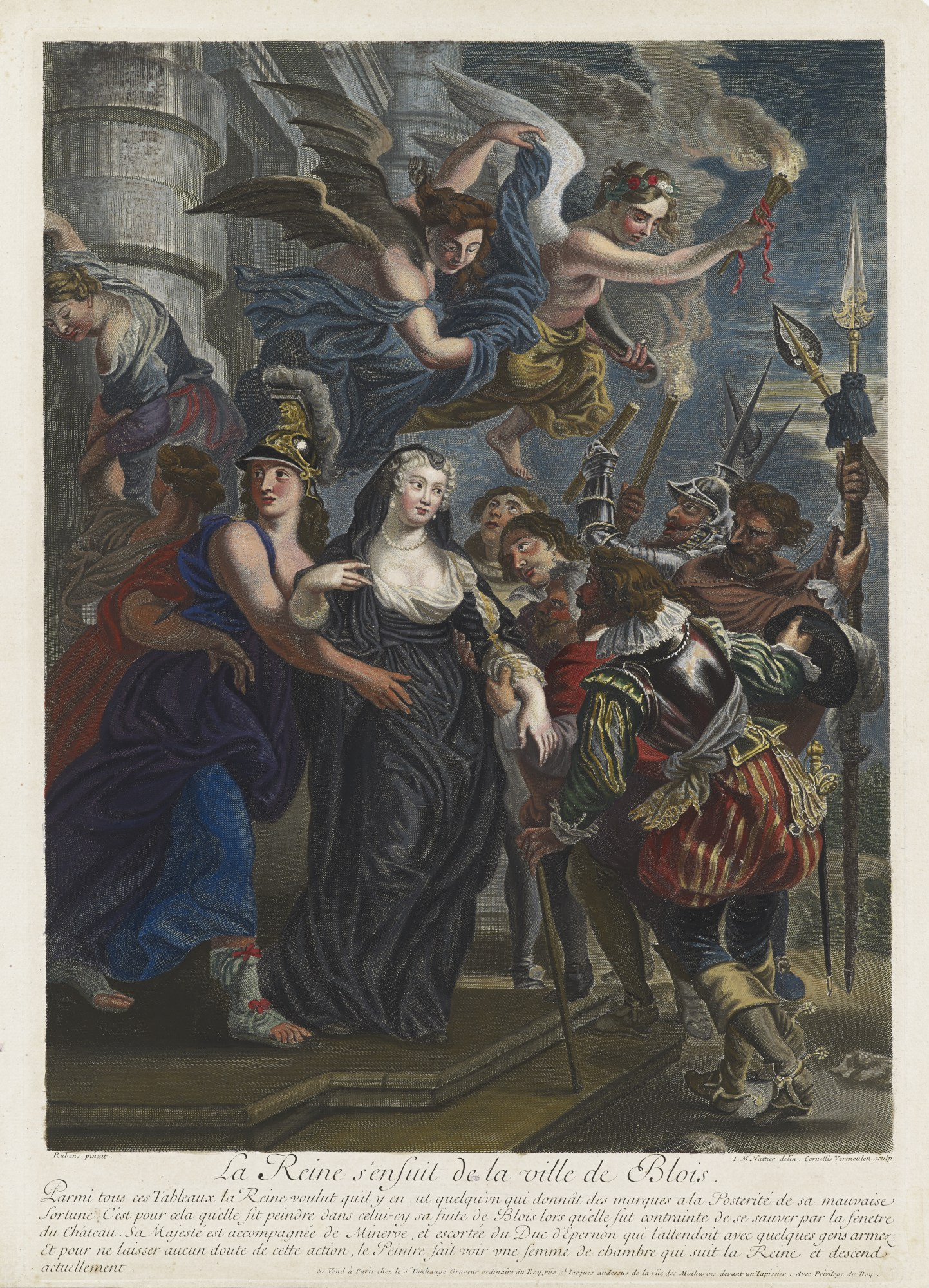
The Queen fleeing the city of Bloy, after Rubens

Cornelis Vermeulen or Cornelis Martinus Vermeulen (1654/55 in Antwerp – 1708/09 in Antwerp) was a Flemish printmaker mainly known for his portraits, reproductive prints, frontispieces and illustrations. He trained in Antwerp and worked for a number of years in Paris.

== Life ==
He was born in Antwerp in 1654 or 1655 as the son of Geeraert Vermeulen and Christina de Gande. His father was registered in the Antwerp Guild of Saint Luke as a 'stoffeerder' ('decorator'), and Cornelis was registered as an apprentice with Peeter Clouet (Clouwet) in the Antwerp guild in the guild year 1668–1669. In 1681, he joined the Confraternity of the Bachelors (Sodaliteit van de Bejaerde Jongmans), a fraternity for bachelors established in Antwerp by the Jesuit order.

In the years 1682 to 1683, he was active in Paris, where he moved in the circle of Flemish artists, amongst them the Antwerp battle and portrait painter Constantijn Francken. He was registered as a 'wijnmeester' (i.e. son of a master) in the Guild of St. Luke in Antwerp between 18 September 1682 and 18 September 1683. He maintained contact with Paris to which he often returned and where he was connected with the workshop of the Flemish printmaker Gérard Edelinck.

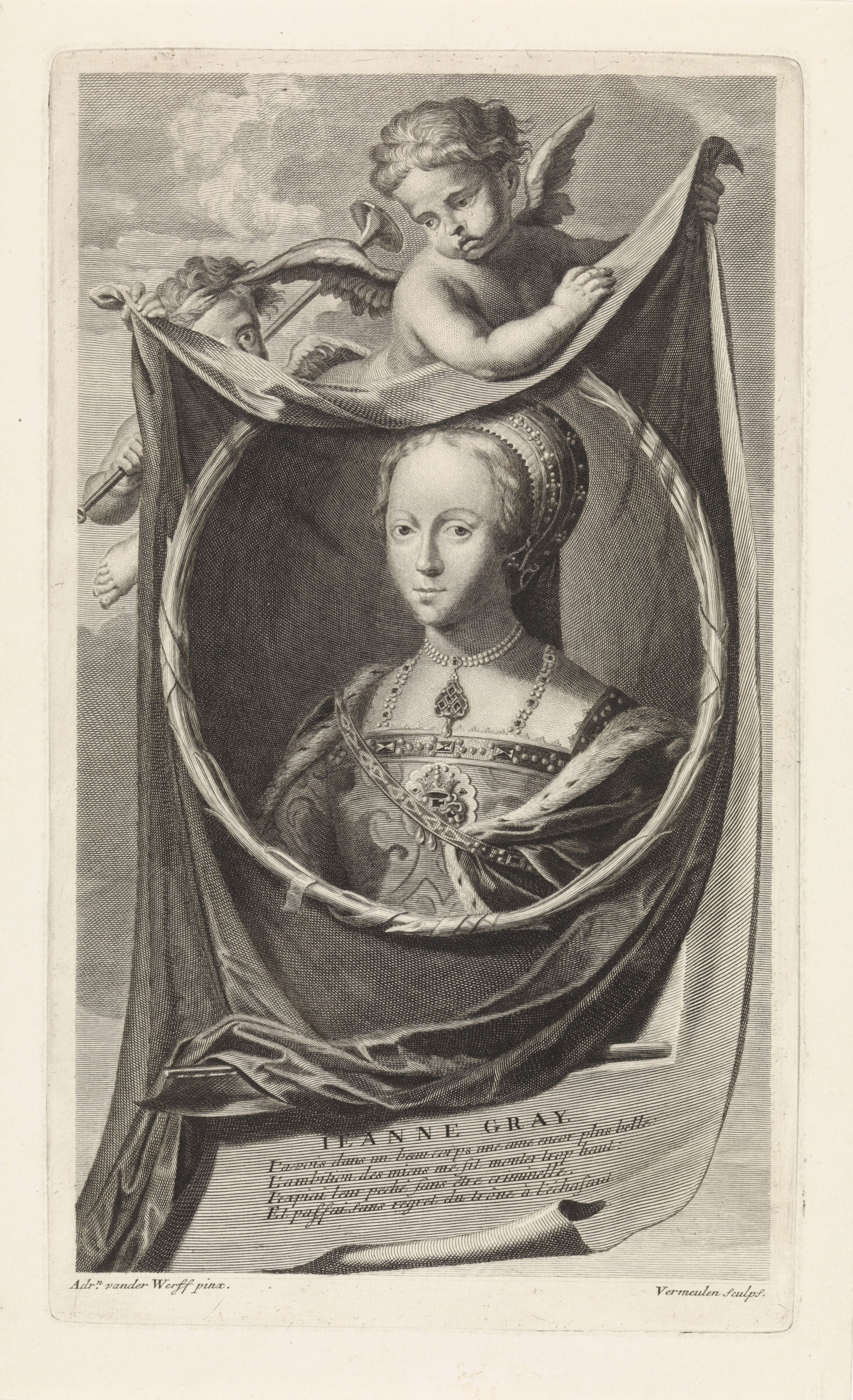
Portrait of Lady Jane Grey

He married Maria Anna van de Wee before 18 December 1706. The exact time of his death is not known, but it is suggested that he died in Antwerp between 18 September 1708 and 18 September 1709, as his death duties were paid to the Guild during that period. After his death, his widow married the painter Pieter Andreas Rijsbrack.

== Work ==
Vermeulen was a printmaker who mainly made portrait prints. He made portrait prints after the works of Nicolas de Largillière, Pierre Mignard, Hyacinthe Rigaud, Adriaen van der Werff and others. He made themed series of portraits, such as the series of Eleven portraits from English history published in 1697 which consists of 11 portraits of English kings, queens and nobles made after designs by Adriaen van der Werff. The Portrait of Lady Jane Grey from this series shows Lady Jane Grey in an oval which is held by two crying putti. Under her portrait, there is an ax which refers to her execution.

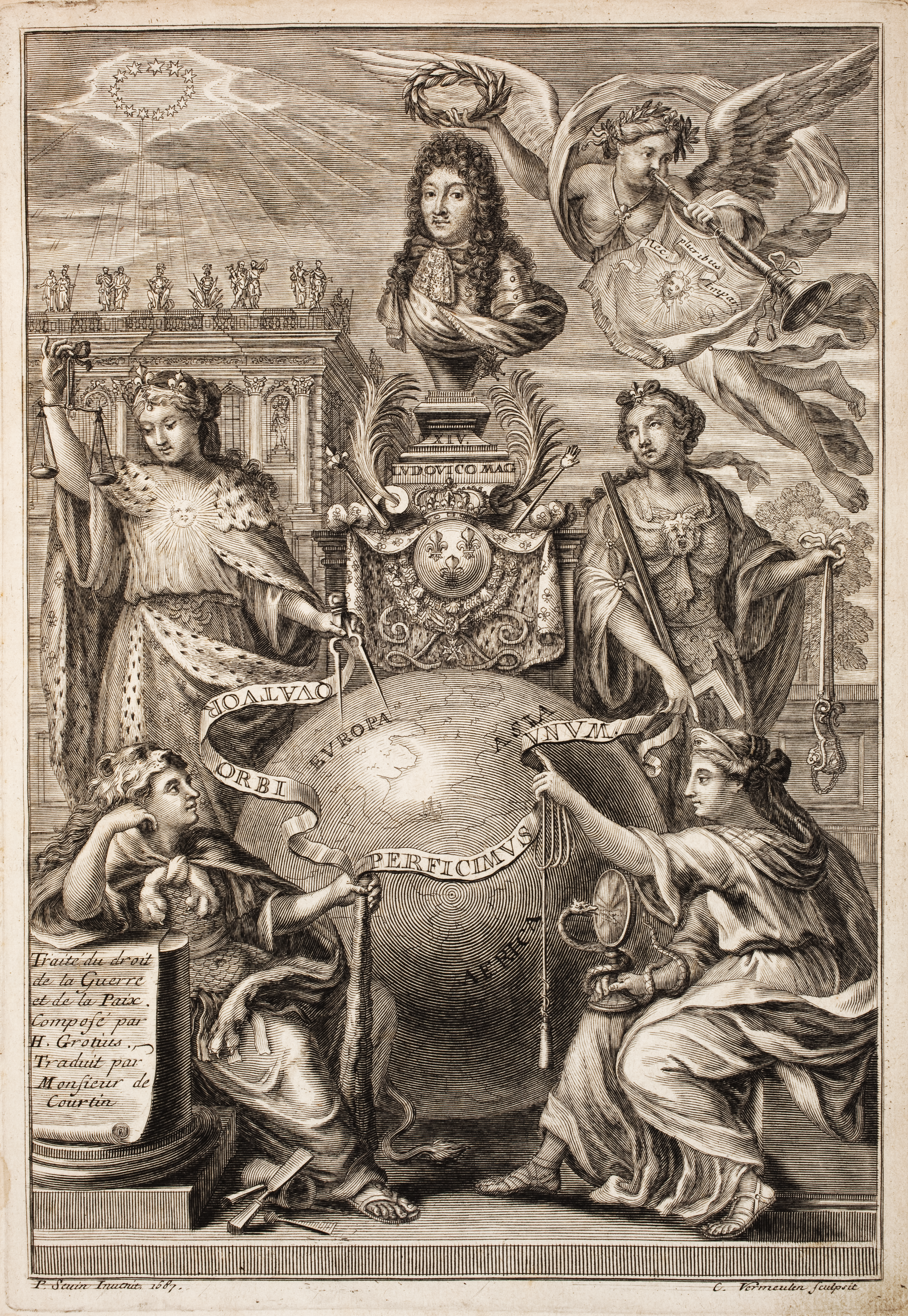
Frontispiece for Le droit de la guerre et de la paix

He also made reproductive prints after the works of the old masters such as Rubens, Adriaen van der Werff and Francesco Trevisani.

He engraved frontispieces for publications such as the frontispiece for Hugo de Groot and Antoine de Courtin's, Le droit de la guerre et de la paix (The law of war and peace)(Arnould Seneuze, Paris, 1687) and the frontispiece to Isaac de Larrey's Histoire d'Angleterre (History of England) (Rotterdam: 1697–1713).

He provided illustrations to various publications. These include the Snake in a landscape made for Guy Tachard's Voyage de Siam des Peres Jesuites (Travels of the Jesuits in Siam)(Paris, 1686). He also contributed six engraved plates (of which three folding plates) to Gabriel Dellon's Relation de l'inquisition de Goa (History of the Inquisition in Goa) (Paris, Chez Daniel Horthemels, 1688). The book recounts the ordeal of Gabriel Dellon, a French Roman Catholic physician who had traveled in the East Indies, where he was arrested, tortured and convicted to the galleys by the Inquisition in Goa. The three full-page plates depict heretics accused of different crimes wearing sanbenitos, i.e. special tunics that represent their fate: the Samarra, which is covered with dragons, devils, and flames surrounding an image of the heretic himself, signifying that the impenitent heretic was condemned to be burnt alive at the stake, the Fuego revolto, which is covered simply with flames pointing downwards, signifying that the heretic who became penitent after being condemned was not to be burnt alive at the stake, but was to have the mercy of being strangled before the fire was lit, and the Sambenito featured red saltires, whose wearer was only to do penance. The three folding plates show the following scenes: the procession of the Inquisition into a church, the Inquisition in session within a church and penitents being led from a church to be burned at the stake. The designs for the prints were made by Pierre Paul Sevin. The book was placed on the Index of Forbidden Books in 1690.

The three Sanbenitos engraved by Cornelis Vermeulen for Gabriel Dellon's Relation de l'inquisition de Goa, 1688

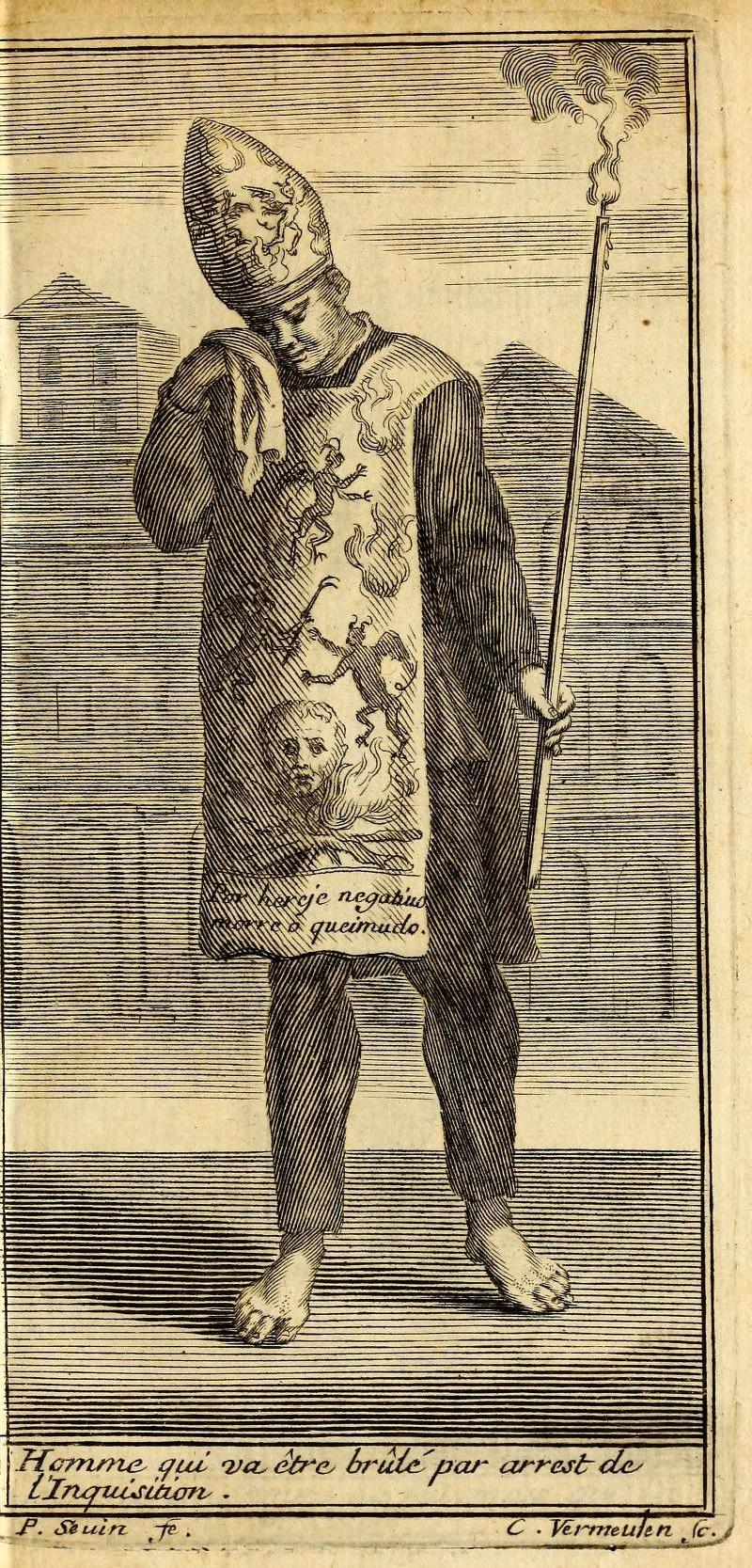
The Samarra

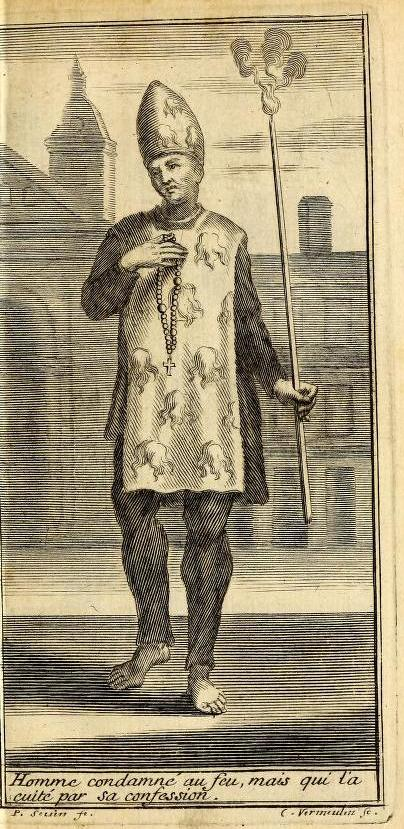
The Fuego revolto

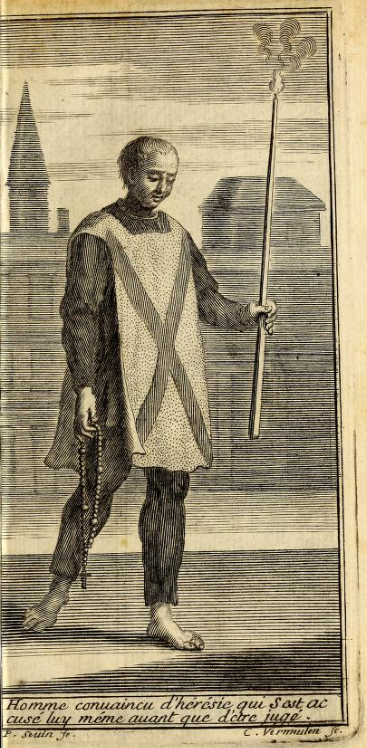
The Sambenito
