= Sanbenito =

Penitential garment during the Spanish Inquisition

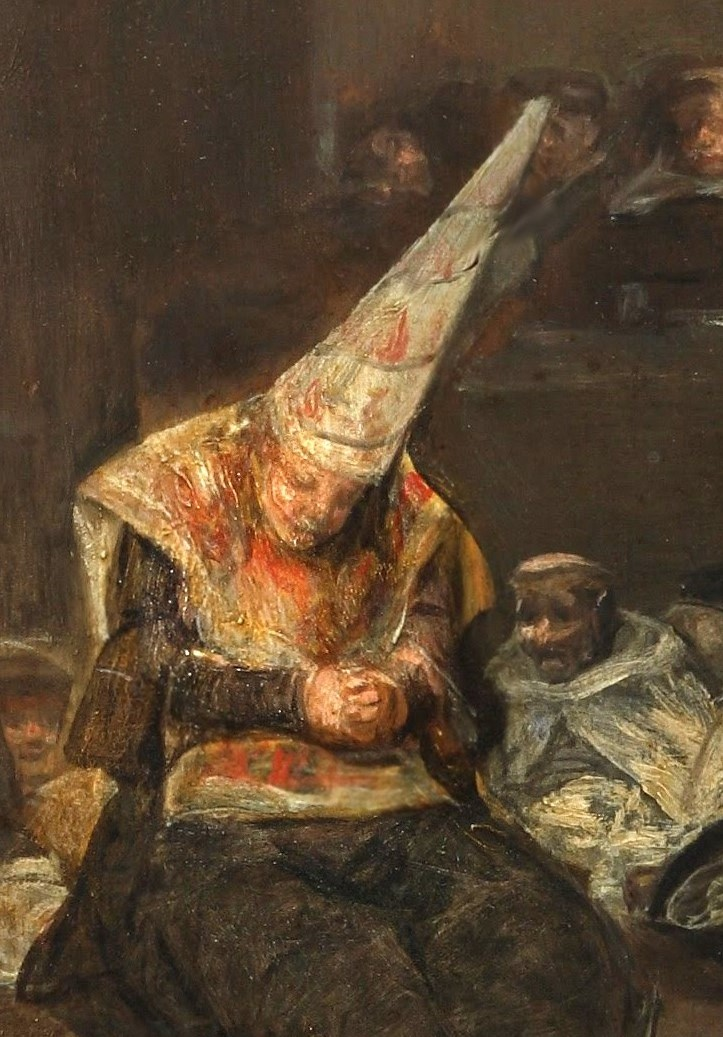
A convicted heretic before the Inquisition, wearing a sanbenito and a capirote (Francisco de Goya)

The sanbenito (Spanish: sambenito; Catalan: gramalleta, sambenet, Portuguese: sambenito) was a penitential garment that was used especially during the Portuguese and Spanish Inquisitions (also covering the Spanish] and Portuguese Empires). It was similar to a scapular, either yellow with red saltires for penitent heretics or black and decorated with devils and flames for impenitent heretics to wear at an auto-da-fé (meaning 'act of faith').

== Etymology ==
"San Benito" is the Spanish name of either Benedict the Moor or Benedict of Nursia. An alternative etymology by Covarrubias and former editions of the Diccionario de la lengua española has it from saco bendito "blessed sack". Américo Castro "proved that it does not come from saco bendito". Theologians tried to explain how the venerated saint Benedict was associated to the infamous sambenito. Friar Antonio de Yepes derived it from the scapulars worn by the Benedictines.

== Description and use ==
Mexican writer and historian Luis González Obregón describes the three basic types of tunic used to distinguish those being punished by the Inquisition. These were the samarra, the fuego revolto, and the sambenito. The samarra was painted with dragons, devils, and flames amongst which the image of the prisoner could be distinguished, signifying that the impenitent heretic was condemned to be burnt alive at the stake. The fuego revolto was painted simply with flames pointing downwards, signifying that the heretic who became penitent after being condemned was not to be burnt alive at the stake, but was to have the mercy of being strangled before the fire was lit. Finally, the sambenito featured red saltires, whose wearer was only to do penance. Eventually all three types of tunic became known as a sambenito; a conical cap, denominated coroza (and capirote), of the same material and motifs as the corresponding sambenito, would also be worn.

The three types of sambenito, engraved by Cornelis Vermeulen for Gabriel Dellon's Relation de l'inquisition de Goa, 1688

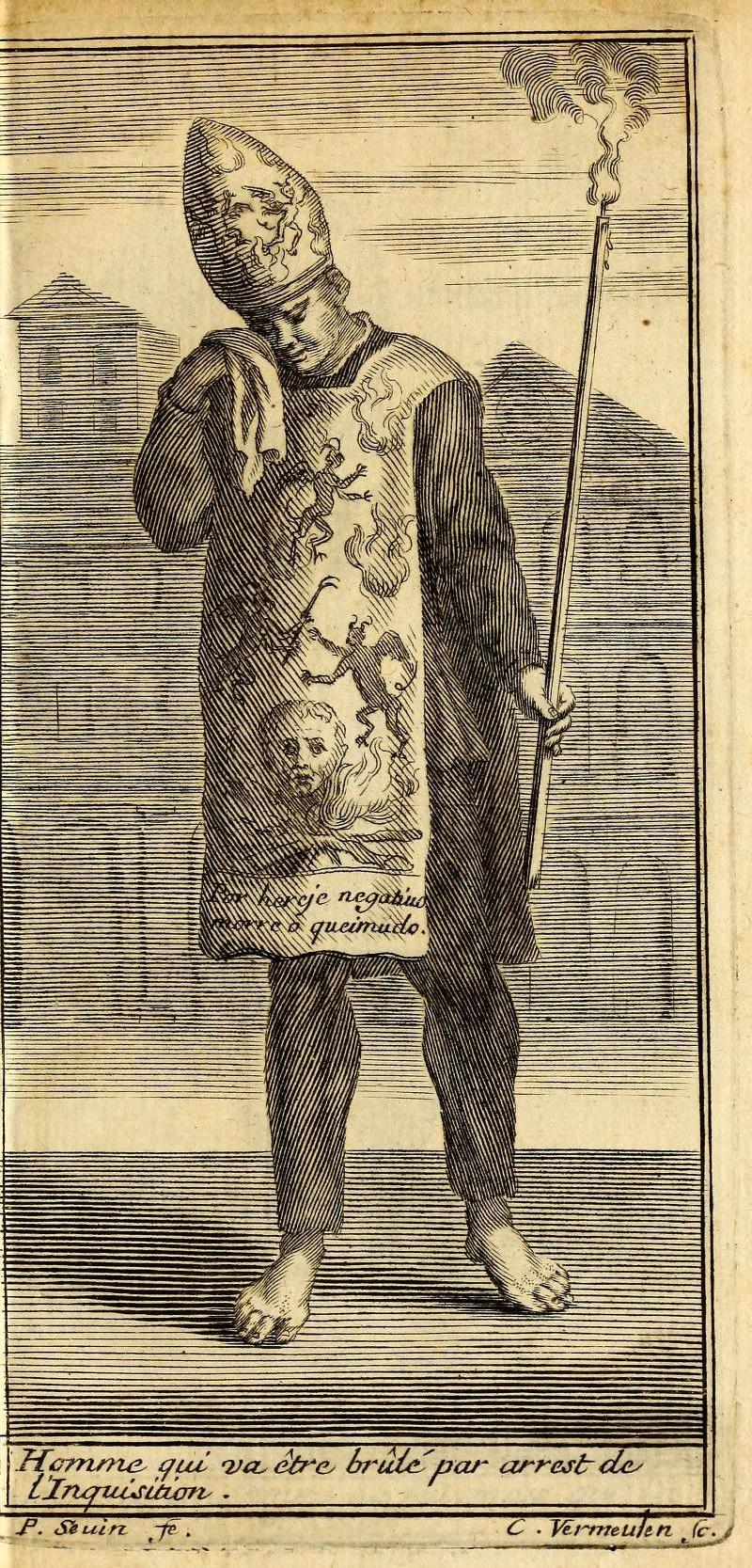
The samarra

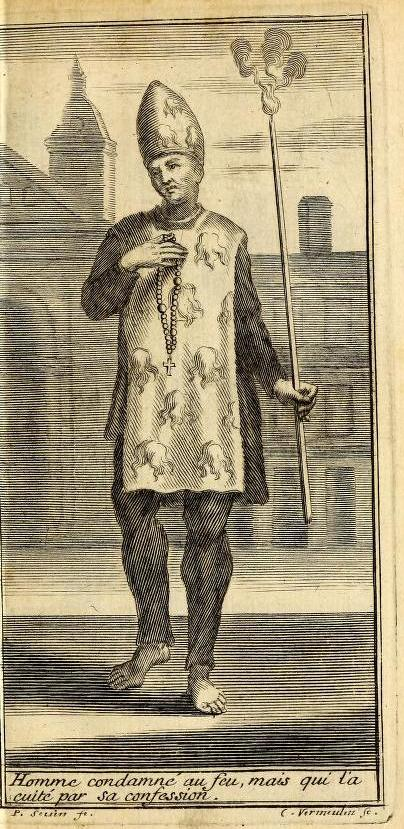
The fuego revolto

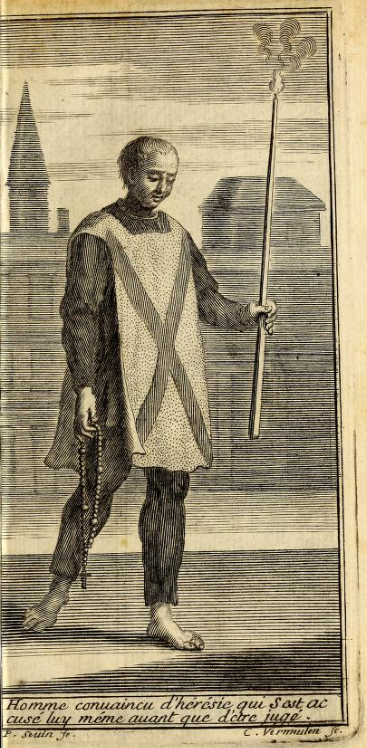
The sambenito

The heretics, found guilty by the inquisitors, had to walk in the procession wearing the sambenito, the coroza, the rope around the neck, the rosary, and in their hands a yellow or green wax candle. The court determined how long the penitent should wear the sambenito: during the reading of the sentence, several years or the rest of their lives. Hiding or removing it without permission carried new penalties.

Inquisitor Luis de Páramo considered the "garments of skin" given to Adam and Eve after their sin in Genesis 3 a precedent of the sambenito. Other precedents are the sackcloth and cilices worn by penitents in the Middle Ages. Diego de Simancas linked the display of sambenitos in churches to the episode of Moses' order to convert the censers of rebel Korah into plates attached to the altar (Numbers 16).

As the original sambenitos deteriorated, they were copied in new collective sheets, known as mantas or mantetas, 'blankets', or cortinas 'curtains', as in this 1550s oil on canvas from Coruña del Conde, Burgos, Spain. It reproduces the sambenitos of judaizers and Lutherans from 1490-1509. It has been argued that it has been subjected to aggressive restoration. For example, 1509 is eight years before Luther's Wittenberg Theses.

Originally the penitential garments were hung up in the churches as mementos of disgrace to their wearers, and as the trophies of the Holy Inquisition. The lists of the punished were also called sambenitos. The rules of how and where the sambenitos were made and displayed varied locally. Some were made by renowned painters, who could be familiares 'lay collaborators'. If the budget was not enough, less skilled artisans were employed. The bearers of the surnames of those listed in the church of Santo Domingo in Palma de Mallorca were discriminated against as xuetas (the local name for Converso Jews), even when those surnames were also borne by Old Christians and the surnames of other Majorcan Judaizers were not preserved at the cathedral.

The Iberian societies were concerned about "cleanliness of blood" and genealogy. The sambenitos displayed in churches were consulted as evidence of impure ancestry. Unlike the secret archive of the Inquisition, they were publicly accessible. Notarized copies could be included in trials.

There was no procedure to remove the exhibited sambenitos. Theft occurred in spite of the punishment. A 1516 riot in Sicily targeted them. Some communities asked that the sambenitos of foreigners were marked as such, to avoid the shame on the locals. Some elite families managed to move theirs to a less visible location. Conversely, false sambenitos were displayed against rival families in Mexico.

=== Location ===
Some local clergymen or foreigners opposed the display of sambenitos as it took place and attention away from pious images. They were neither profane nor purely sacred. They were produced by the Inquisition but displayed on churches and monasteries instead of its buildings. They displayed orthodoxy but also tainted the reputation of the community.

The location of the sambenitos in the new Granada Cathedral involved even king Philip II. Considerations of esthetics and liturgy were argued for decades. During the expulsion of the Moriscos, the Inquisition agreed to move them to a parish church.

=== Decadence ===
By the 18th century, lack of concern, wars and decay diminished the presence of the sambenitos. However, there could be supporters, as in Palma de Mallorca, where the Xuetas (converted descendants of Jews) tried to destroy them discreetly with the support of the authorities, but local resistance prevented it. It was in the early 19th century when two Xuetas torn them.

The Peninsular War destroyed or damaged lots of churches including their sambenitos. Napoleon abolished the Spanish Inquisition. They were also discussed by the Courts of Cádiz. In 1813, the Courts decreed their removal and destruction. When Ferdinand VII restored the Inquisition in 1814, they reappeared in a smaller scale. After the abolition of the Portuguese (1821) and Spanish (1834) Inquisitions, they became obsolete.

The sambenito should not be confused with the yellow robes worn by some monks, which are also garments related to penitence and which is one reason that caused the Inquisition to prefer common wool dyed yellow with red crosses for the sambenito. Such were the penitential robes in 1514, when Cardinal Francisco Ximénez de Cisneros replaced the common crosses with those of Saint Andrew. The inquisitors afterwards designated a different tunic for each class of penitents.

In the 1945 edition of México Viejo, Luis González Obregón shows images from Felipe A. Limborch's Historia Inquisitionis, dated 1692, which were images of sambenitos used in the Inquisition.

== See also ==
- Histoire de l'Inquisition en France
- Inquisitorial system
- List of Grand Inquisitors of Spain
- Pittura infamante – Defamatory depiction of petty criminals in Renaissance Italian art
- Sackcloth – Coarse fabric significant to Christianity
- Schandbild
- Vatican Secret Archives

== General references ==
- González Obregon, Luis (1945). Època Colonial, México Viejo, Noticias Históricas, Tradiciones, Leyendas y Costumbres. Editorial Patria, S.A. pp. 107–108.
