= Gerard Rijsbrack =

Flemish Baroque painter (1696–1773)

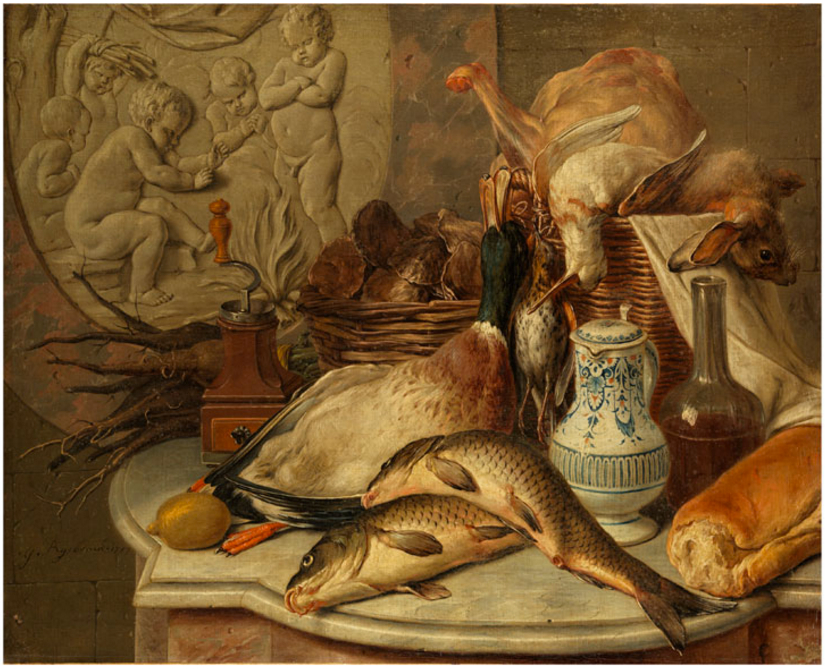
Still life with game and fish

Gerard Rijsbrack or Gerard Rysbrack (1696 – 1773) was a Flemish painter of still lifes, game pieces, hunting scenes and mythological scenes. He first worked in England and later in Paris where he received royal commissions. He was the younger brother of the sculptor John Rysbrack, one of the leading sculptors in England around the mid-18th century.

== Life ==
Gerard Rijsbrack was born in Antwerp as the son of the landscape painter Pieter Rijsbraeck and Geneviève (Genoveva) Compagnon, a French woman his father had married in France. He was baptized in the Antwerp Cathedral on 19 December 1696. Gerard likely studied painting with his father. He became a member of the Guild of St. Luke in Antwerp in 1725.

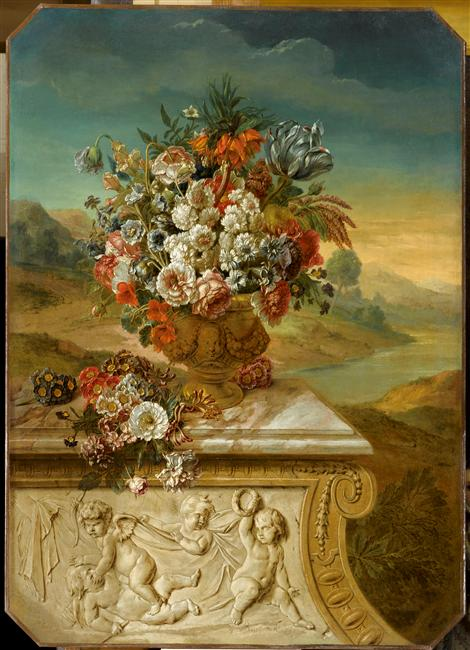
Vase of flowers before a mountainous scenery near a river

Gerard's siblings included a number of artists. His older brother Pieter Andreas was a still life and landscape painter while another older brother was the sculptor John Michael Rysbrack. Pieter Andreas and John Michael moved to London around 1620 where they built successful careers. Gerard joined his two brothers in England. John Michael Rysbrack became one of the leading sculptors in England and was particularly known for his portraits. As a sculptor to the elite, he was able to build a network of relationships with influential people in England. This network may have helped his brothers in gaining commissions from prominent patrons. The absence of signed and dated work by Gerard from his English period may indicate that he worked in the successful workshop of his brother Pieter Andreas.

Gerard left England for Paris where he is known to have been active from around 1747, although he may have moved there before this time. His move to Paris may be related to the fact that his brother Pieter Andreas Rijsbrack was no longer able to work as he was suffering from consumption from which he died in London in October 1748.

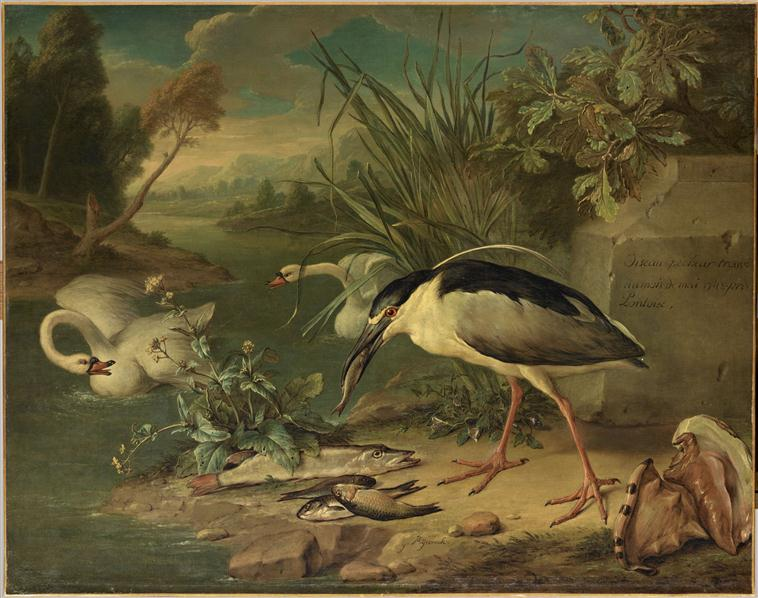
Fishing bird, swans and fish

Gerard Rijsbrack was successful in France where he enjoyed royal patronage. Like his compatriot Pieter Boel in the 17th century, Rysbrack received various commissions to produce paintings for the menagerie at Versailles. The artist also received a royal commission for overdoor paintings of hunting scenes for the Chateau de la Muette, originally the hunting lodge of the French king but used by Louis XV to entertain his mistresses. Rijsbrack received 700 pounds for each hunting piece between 1749 and 1751. Between 1748 and 1751 he also made paintings for the king's mistress Madame de Pompadour, destined for the Ermitage of Pompadour and the Palace of Versailles. He received 4,460 pounds for his paintings for the Ermitage.

He is said to have died blind and impoverished in Antwerp to where he had returned at the end of his life.

== Work ==
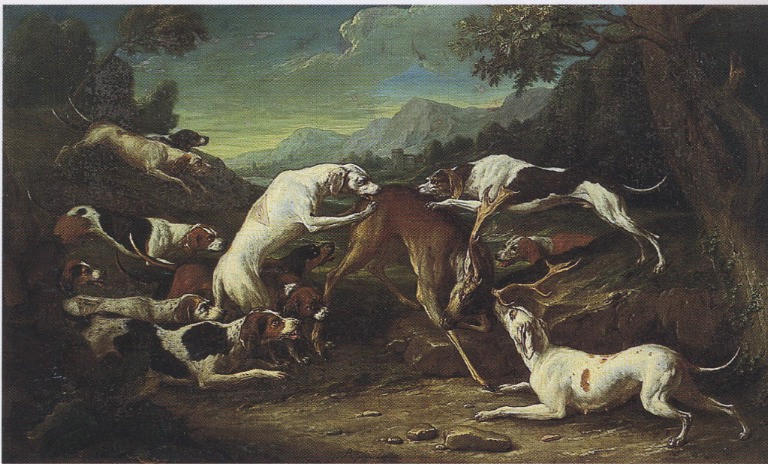
Deer hunt

He is known mainly for his still lifes, game pieces and hunting scenes. He is also reported to have painted mythological subjects.

In his compositions of hunting scenes for Mme Pompadour representing respectively a wolf hunt and a deer hunt, he stayed close to compositions by French painters François Desportes and Jean-Baptiste Oudry. The paintings were primarily intended to leave for posterity images of the king's hounds. The identity of each dog (12 depicted in the deer hunt and 13 in the wolf hunt) is recorded in a memorial on the animal paintings of Rysbrack. Various of the dogs are marked with a triangle with a cross inside. This mark resembles the old French Écu coins and were branded on the dogs that were part of the royal pack.

In two paintings of dead game he made for the menagerie at the Palace of Versailles in 1751 (Louvre Museum, Paris), his manner of representation shows an aesthetic as well as a documentary preoccupation. This intention to make a documentary representation of reality is further confirmed by another work in the Louvre, the Fishing bird, swans and fish, which bears an inscription stating that the subject is a ‘fishing bird found in May 1748 near Pontoise'.
