= Pieter Rijsbraeck =

Flemish painter

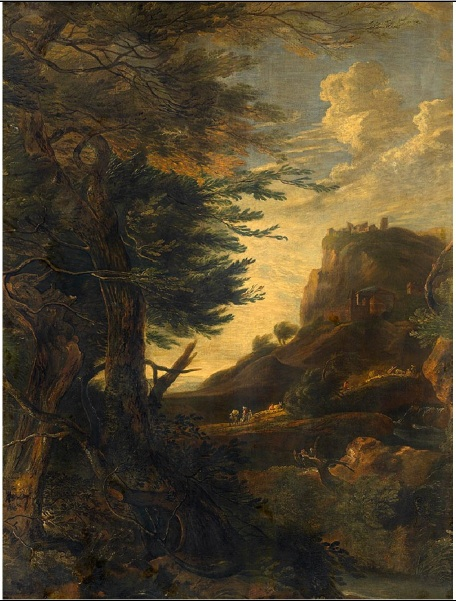
Landscape

Pieter Rijsbraeck (1655–1729) was a Flemish landscape painter, draughtsman and printmaker. He had an international career which brought him to England and Paris. His sons Pieter Andreas Rysbrack and John Michael Rysbrack were respectively a successful painter and sculptor in England in the 18th century.

== Life ==
Pieter Rijsbraeck was born in Antwerp where he was baptized on 25 April 1655. He was the son of Andries Rijsbraeck en Adriana Likens. He studied painting under the landscape painter Philips Augustijn Immenraet and was registered as a pupil in the Antwerp Guild of Saint Luke in 1672–1673. Not long after he left for England where he was active from c. 1675 to 1678.

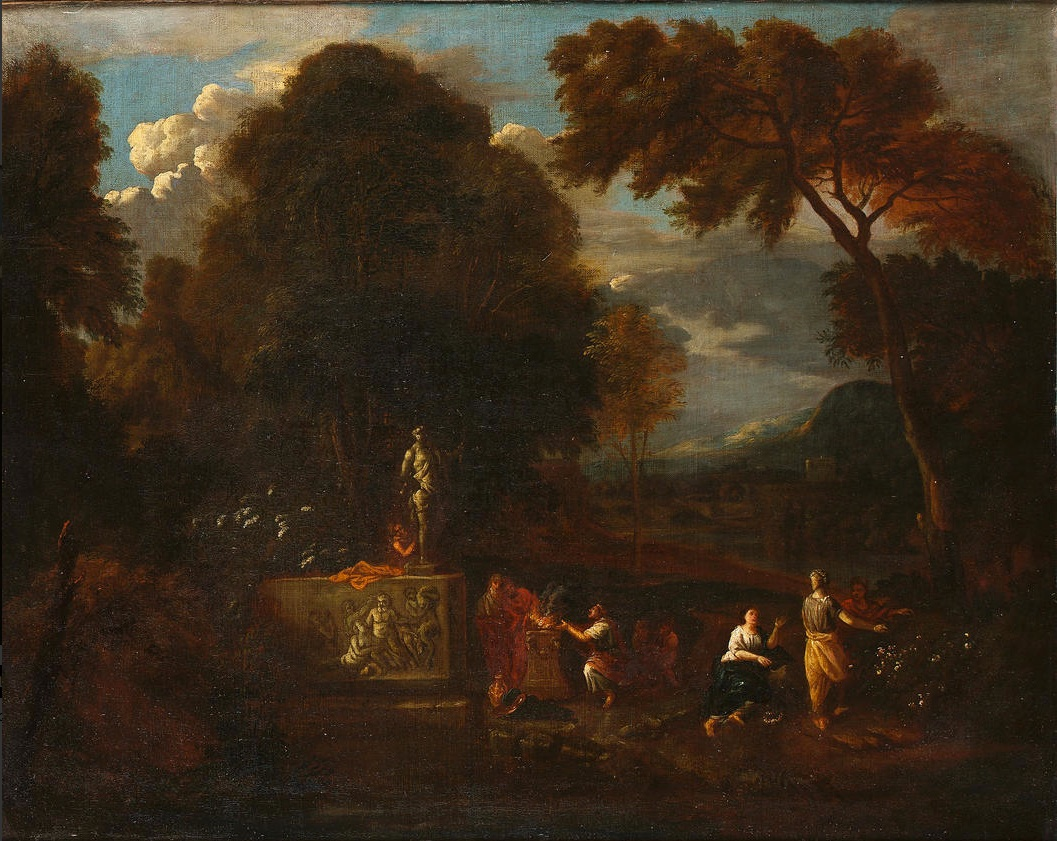
Arcadian landscape with figures making a sacrifice before an altar

He returned to Antwerp where he became a master in the Guild of Saint Luke in 1677–78. Not long after he left Antwerp again, this time for Paris where he was active for about ten years. Here he married Genoveva Compagnon, the widow of the Antwerp sculptor Philippe de Buyster who had died in Paris in 1688. Two of his sons became renowned artists in England: Pieter Andreas Rysbrack was a successful landscape and still life painter while John Michael Rysbrack was the leading sculptor in England in the mid 18th century. Another son named Gerard also became a painter. It is possible that the painter Jacques or Jacob Cornill Rijsbrack (1685–1765) was his son. If so this must have been with another spouse since Jacob was born before Pieter Rijsbraeck married Genoveva Compagnon in Paris. The genre painter Ludovicus Rijsbrack active around 1716–1717 in Antwerp may also have been a son of Pieter.

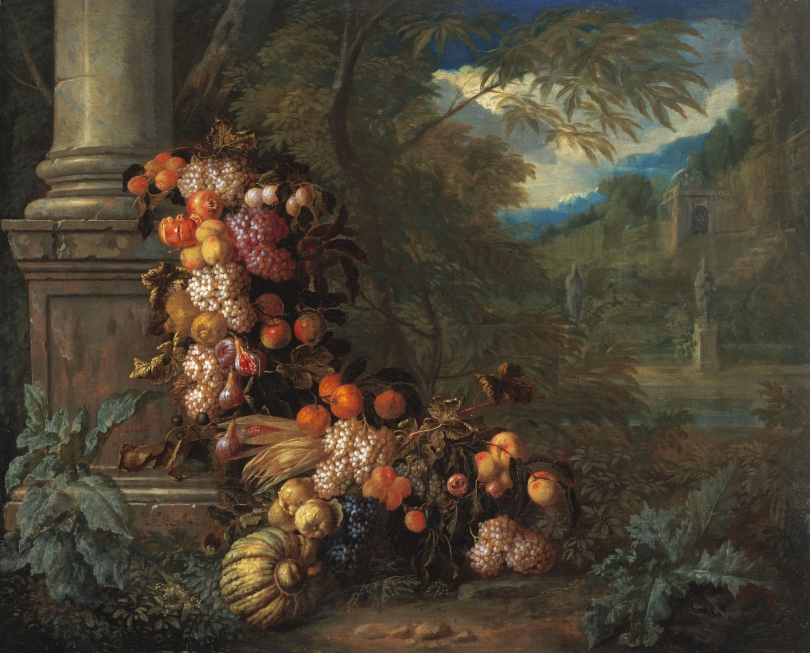
Still life with Fruit in a Landscape, collaboration with Jan Pauwel Gillemans the Younger

Pieter Rijsbraeck returned to Antwerp in 1689 (or possibly 1692) and was registered again as a master in the local Guild. His wife died in 1719.

After many years of activity in Antwerp he moved to Brussels in 1720. He died in Brussels in 1729.

His pupils included his sons Gerard and Pieter Andreas, and Karel Breydel.

== Work ==
Pieter Rijsbraeck was a landscape specialist. During his stay in France he was influenced by the classicist art movement that arose in the last quarter of the 17th century. He was in particular influenced by the French landscape artist Gaspard Dughet who painted in this classicizing style. His paintings often include mythological themes set in an idealized landscape.

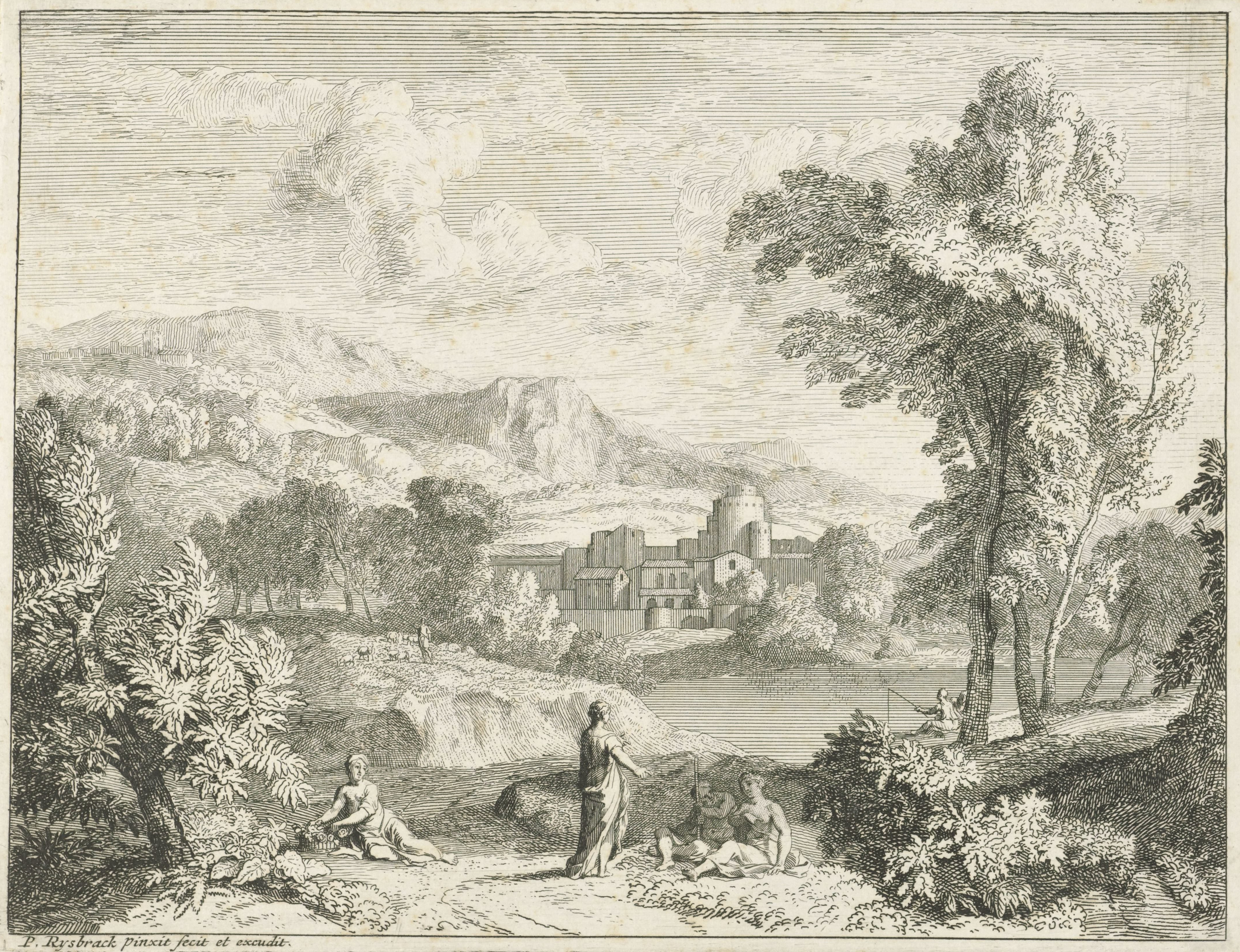
Various figures near a river

As was the custom at the time, Pieter Rijsbraeck regularly collaborated with other artists who were specialists in a particular genre. He collaborated with the still life painter Jan Pauwel Gillemans the Younger on two pendants depicting a landscape with a fruit still life painting (Private collection). The paintings are good examples of the classicizing style of the time. Pieter Rijsbraeck painted an idealized landscape in broad brush strokes which contrasts with the detailed fruit still lifes painted by Gillemans.

Pieter Rijsbraeck was a gifted etcher. A series of six etches depicting mythological scenes in idealized landscapes is in the collections of the Rijksmuseum and the British Museum.
