= John Michael Rysbrack =

Flemish sculptor (1694–1770)

John Rysbrack
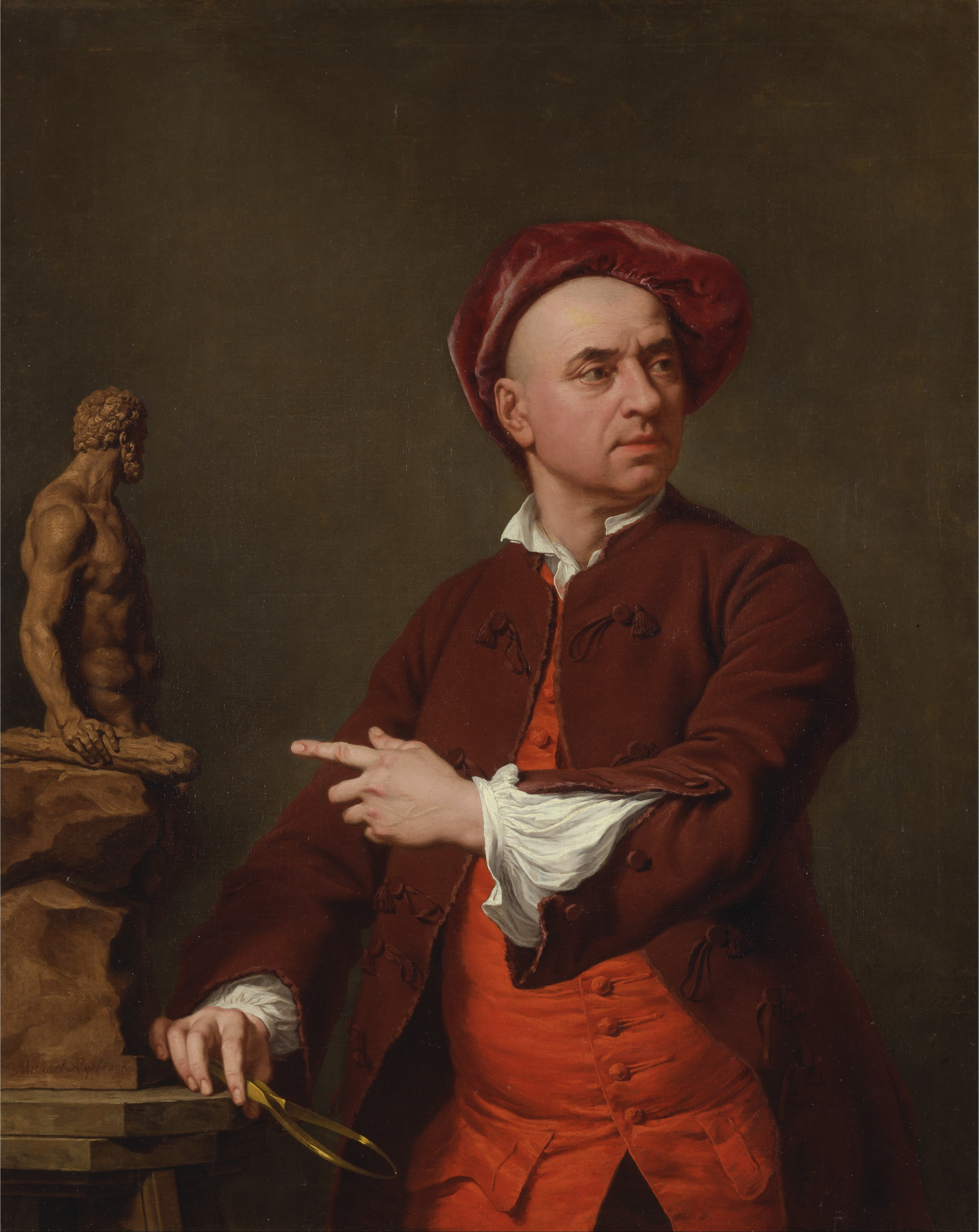
- Rysbrack by Andrea Soldi, c. 1753
- Born: 24 June 1694; Antwerp, Brabant, Spanish Netherlands
- Died: 8 January 1770 (aged 75); London, England, Great Britain
- Parent: Pieter Rijsbraeck

Johannes Michel or John Michael Rysbrack, original name Jan Michiel Rijsbrack, often referred to simply as Michael Rysbrack (24 June 1694 – 8 January 1770), was an 18th-century Flemish sculptor, who spent most of his career in England where he was one of the foremost sculptors of monuments, architectural decorations and portraits in the first half of the 18th century. His style combined the Flemish Baroque with Classical influences. He operated an important workshop whose output left an important imprint on the practice of sculpture in England.

== Family background and early life ==
Rysbrack was born on 24 June 1694 in Antwerp, the son of the landscape painter Pieter Rijsbraeck and Geneviève (Genoveva) Compagnon, a French woman who his father had married in France.

John was apprenticed to the Antwerp sculpture master Michiel van der Voort (the Elder) from 1706 to 1712. He became a member of the Guild of St. Luke in Antwerp in the Guild year 1714/1715. The following year he took on two apprentices. None of his works from this period have been preserved.

Michael's siblings included a number of artists. His older brother Pieter Andreas was a still life and landscape painter while his younger brother Gerard was a painter of still lifes, game pieces, hunting scenes and mythological scenes. Pieter Andreas and John Michael moved to London around 1720 where they built successful careers. Gerard later joined his two brothers in England.

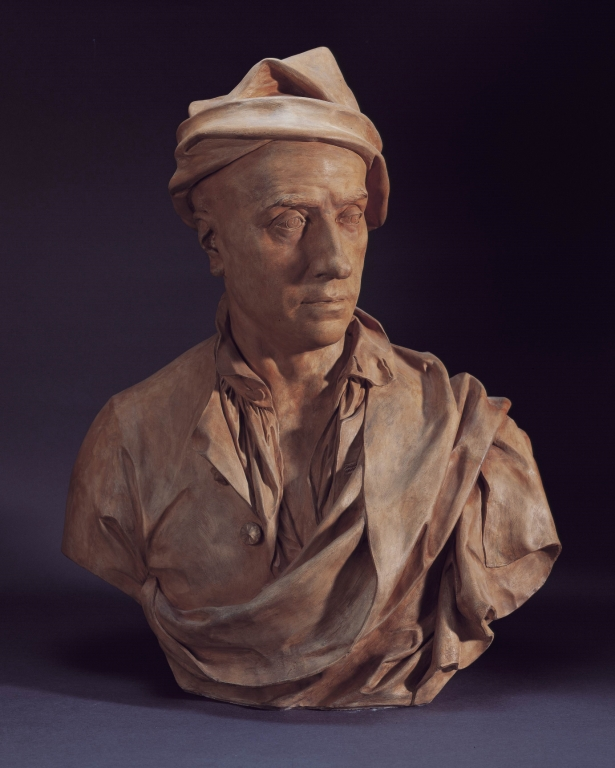
Self-Portrait

== Career ==
In London, Rysbrack quickly established himself as the leading sculptor, a position he was to retain until the mid-1740s, remaining one of the top three sculptors in Britain until shortly before his death. He operated an important workshop with many assistants, including other Flemish sculptors such as Gaspar van der Hagen and James Francis Verskovis.

He produced vivid portraits and monuments of lively baroque composition, rapidly establishing himself as a highly sought-after sculptor. He executed busts and funerary monuments of many of the most prominent men of his day, including the monument to Isaac Newton in Westminster Abbey, a statue of Marlborough, and busts of Walpole, Bolingbroke, and Pope. Dr Cox Macro commissioned him to make a bust of Flemish painter Peter Tillemans on his death in 1734.

In 1733 he carved a magnificent marble portrait bust of George Hamilton, 1st Earl of Orkney (1666–1737) in the guise of a Roman centurion. Orkney was a distinguished general serving under the Duke of Marlborough. Orkney had taken the surrender of the French at the Battle of Blenheim in 1704, and he took part in numerous subsequent battles during the War of the Spanish Succession. One of Rysbrack's greatest works, the bust of Lord Orkney is on display at the Victoria and Albert Museum, London. Its special character owes something to a bond between the sculptor and Lord Orkney, one that had its origins nearly 30 years earlier and was no doubt enhanced in their conversation when Lord Orkney sat to the sculptor for the modelling of the bust. Rysbrack would have been aware of Lord Orkney's heroism during the various campaigns in the Low Countries during the War of the Spanish Succession, not least the Battle of Ramillies on 23 May 1706 after which Orkney led the pursuit of the defeated French forces. Following the battle and pursuit, city after city – including Brussels, Bruges and Antwerp – capitulated to Marlborough's forces. In Antwerp, Rysbrack's home city, to which Orkney was dispatched by Marlborough with re-enforcements for Major-General Cadogan, the Spanish Governor was in no mood to offer even a token resistance, and constrained the French part of the garrison to join him in surrendering the city on 6 June. The arrival in Antwerp of Marlborough's victorious forces, led by Orkney (Marlborough himself arriving on 12 June) is an event that Rysbrack, then a boy aged 12, would surely have witnessed. These events must have given sculptor and Lord Orkney a great deal of opportunity for shared reminiscences during the sittings for the bust.

In St Michael and All Angels Church, Badminton, there is another splendid monument by Rysbrack, signed and dated 1754. The 2nd and the 3rd Duke of Beaufort are depicted in Roman costume, one standing, the other seated on the sarcophagus and holding a medallion. Decorative, asymmetrical drapery hangs down over the sarcophagus.

Rysbrack also cast the bronze equestrian statue of William III in Queen Square, Bristol in 1733, and sculpted a later monument to Edward Colston in All Saints' Church, Bristol.

== Death ==
Rysbrack died in Vere Street, Westminster, in 1770 and is buried in St Marylebone Parish Church.

== Monuments in Westminster Abbey ==
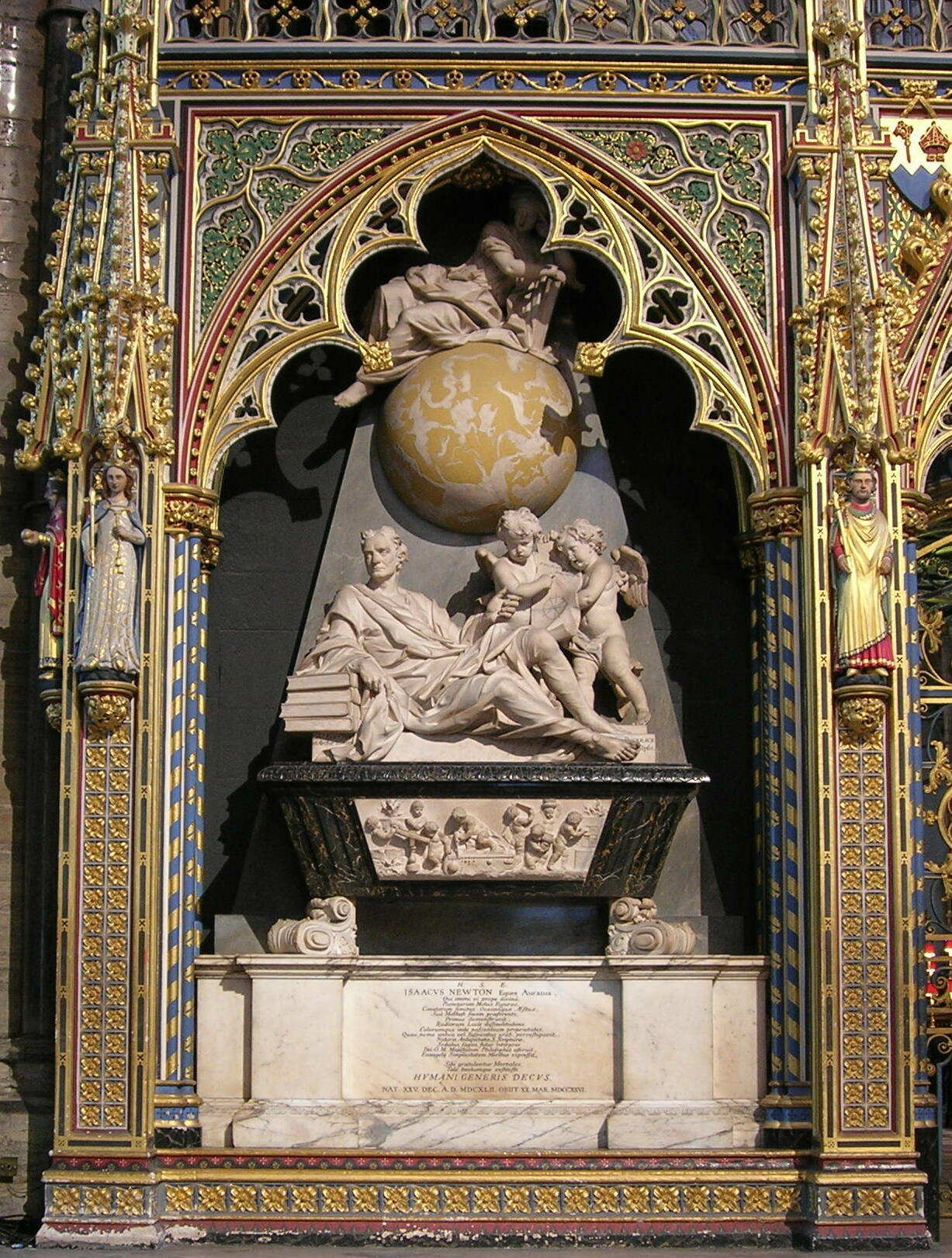
Newton's tomb monument in Westminster Abbey by Rysbrack

Rysbrack is particularly well represented in Westminster Abbey with monuments to:

- John Methuen
- Nicholas Rowe
- Matthew Prior (1721)
- John Freind (with bust) (1728)
- Benjamin Johnson (1728)
- Sir Godfrey Kneller (1730)
- Mrs Oldfield (1730)
- Sir Isaac Newton (1731)
- Daniel Pulteney (1732)
- John Gay (1732)
- Earl Stanhope (1733)
- Sir Richard Kane (1736)
- John Milton (1737)
- Ben Jonson (1737) 100 years after his death
- The Hon. John Hay (1751)
- Edward Vernon (1763)

Other notable works include the tomb of Dean Peter Drelincourt in Armagh Cathedral.

== Gallery ==
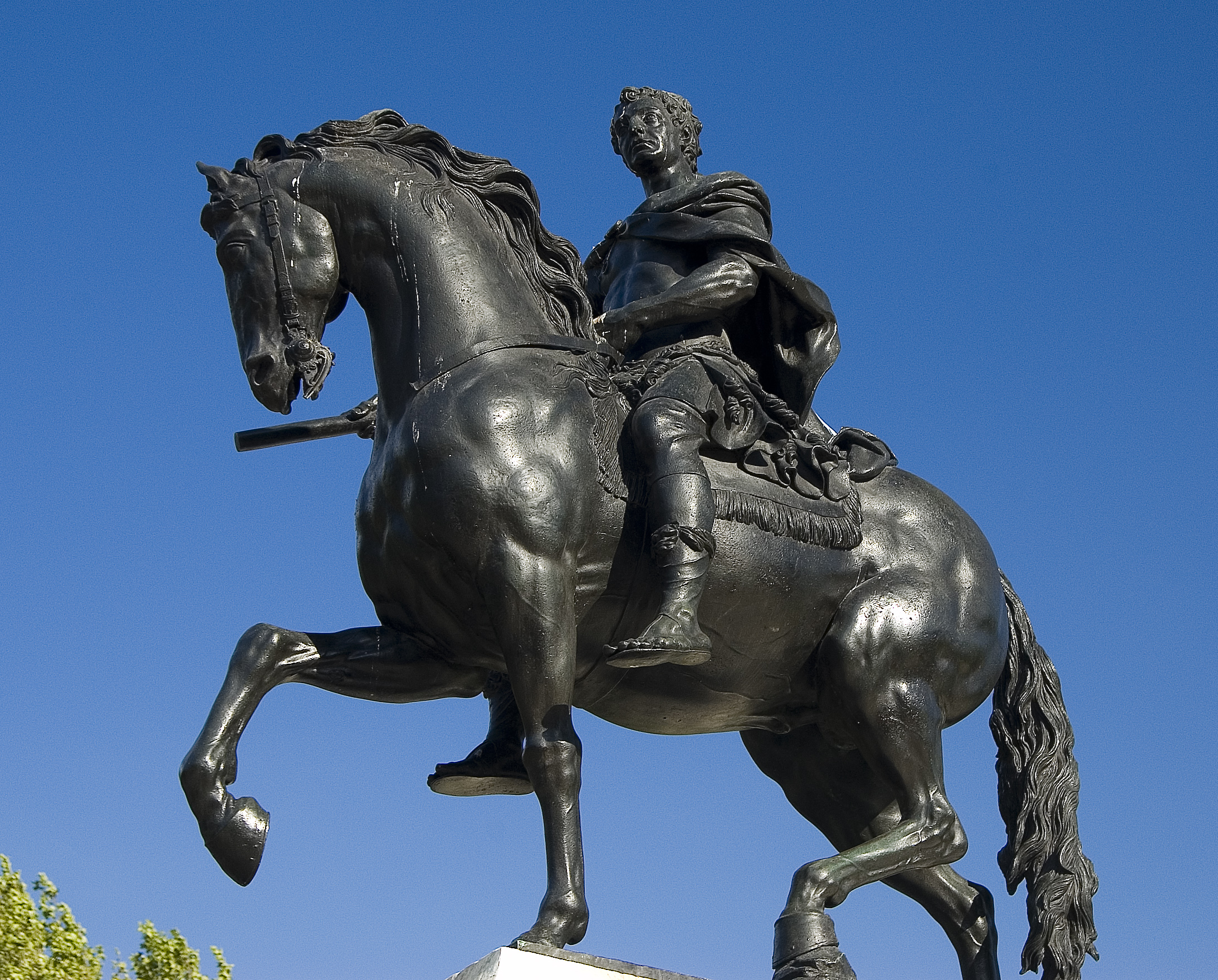
King William III, Queen Square, Bristol

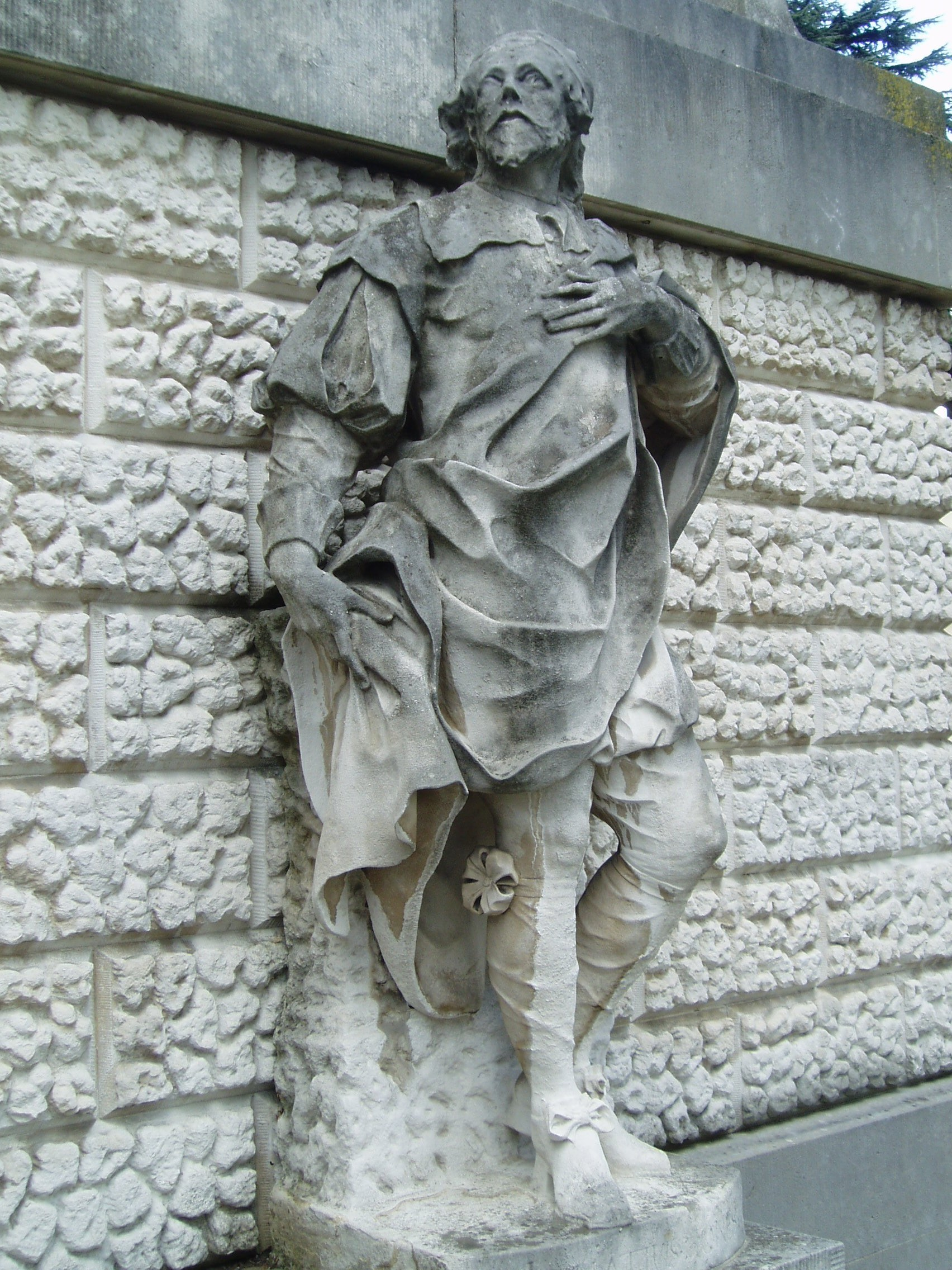
Inigo Jones, Chiswick House, London

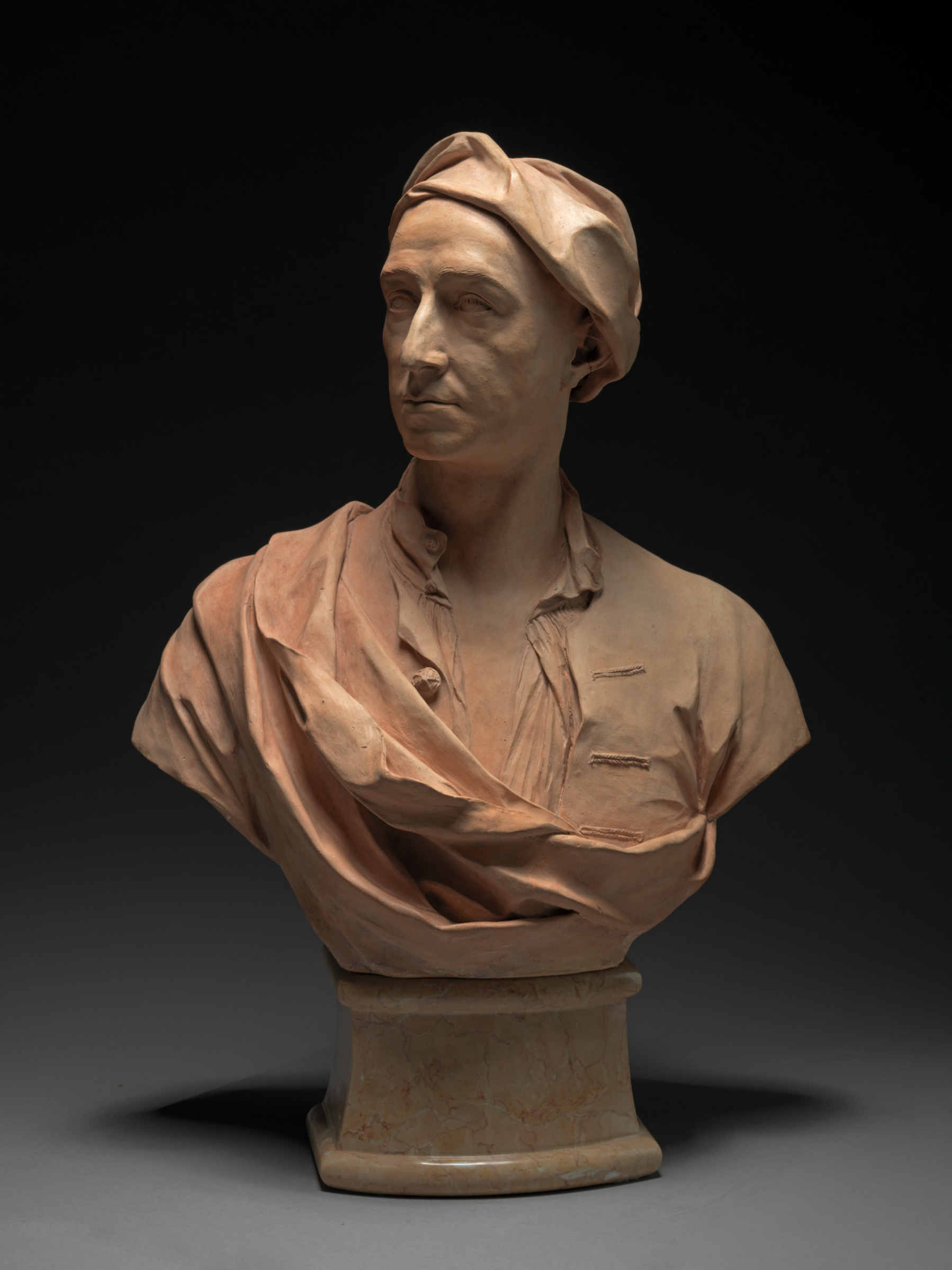
Bust of Peter Tillemans, 1727, Yale Center for British Art

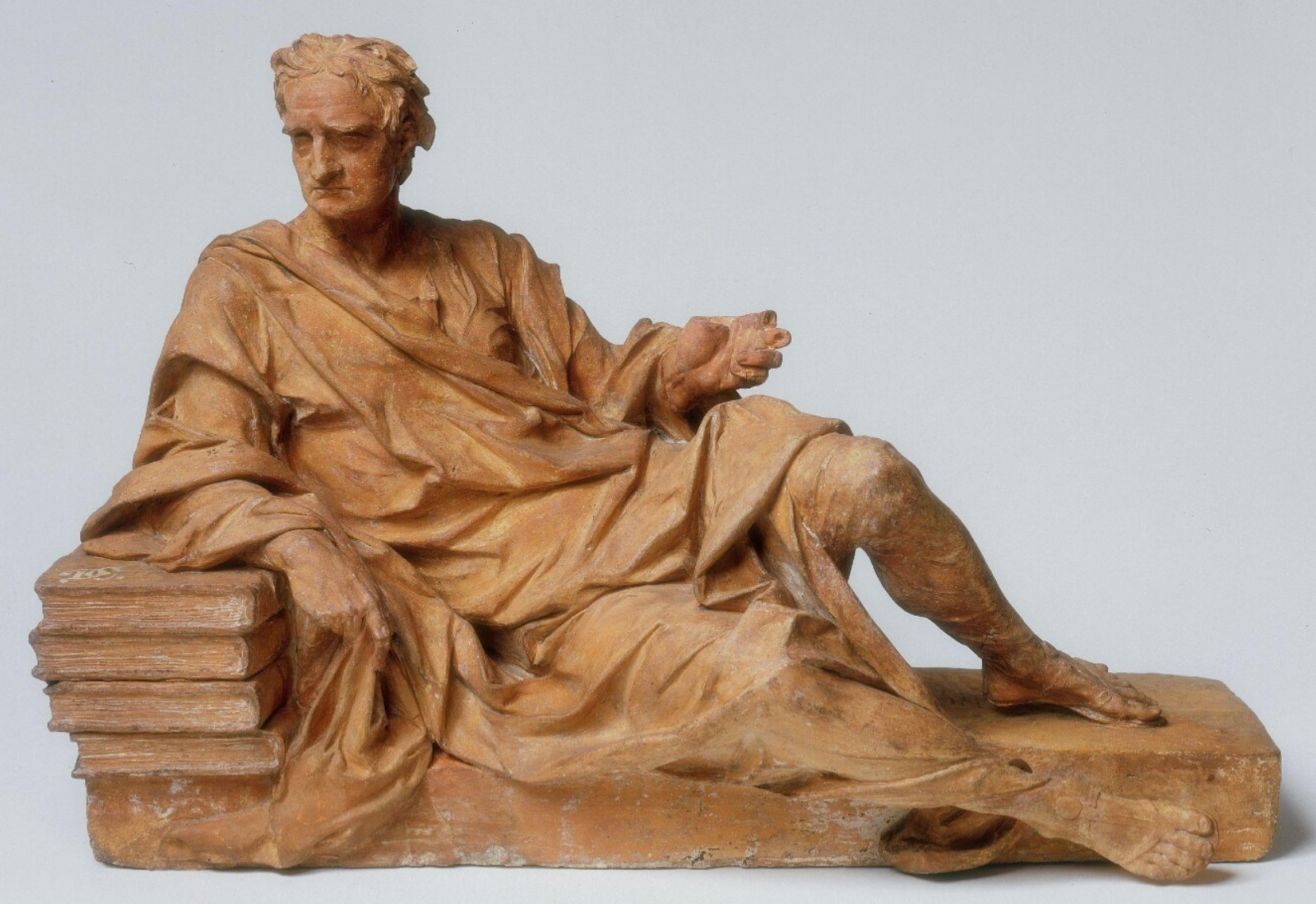
Model for the tomb of Sir Isaac Newton, Victoria and Albert Museum

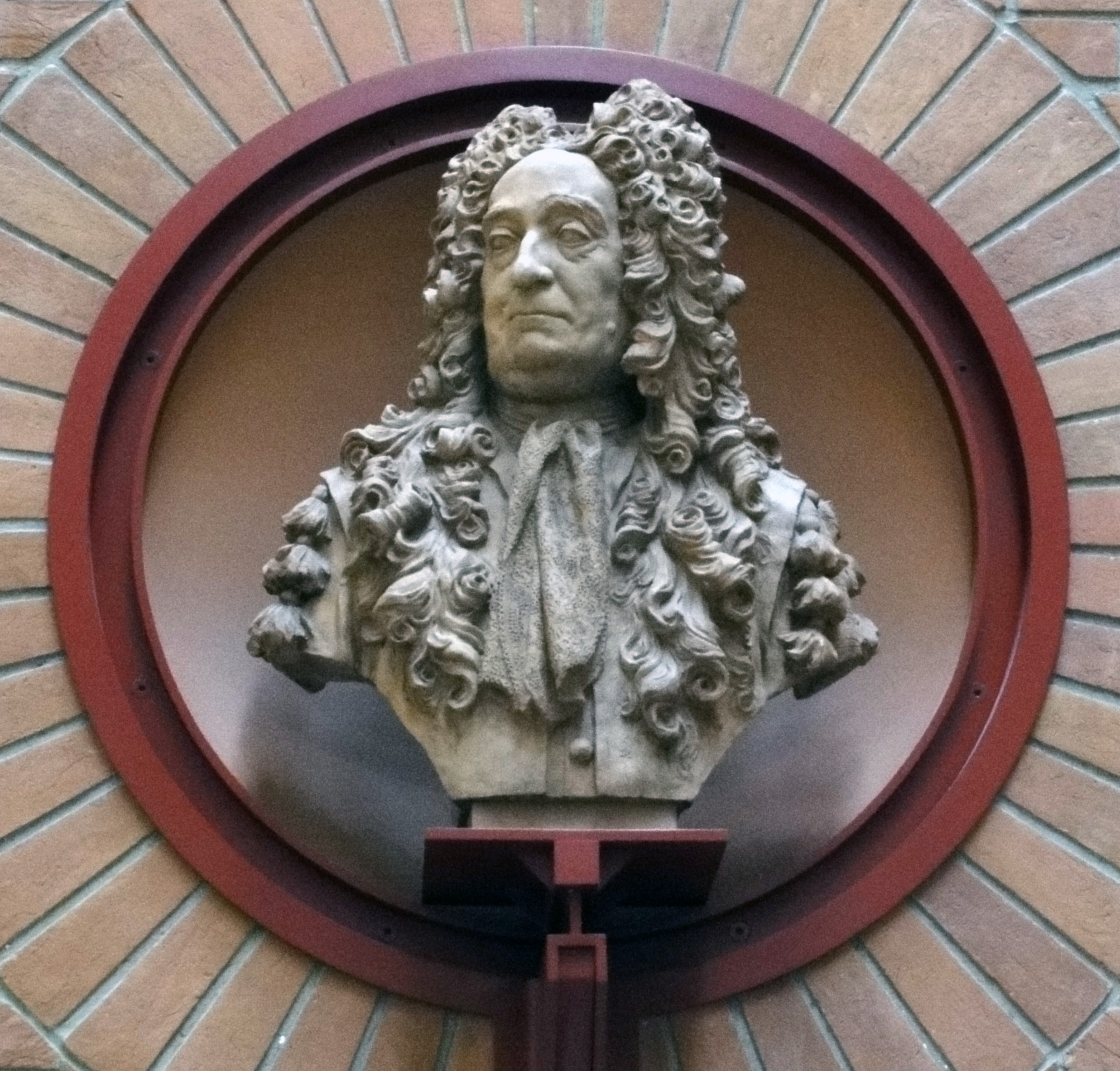
Hans Sloane, British Library, London

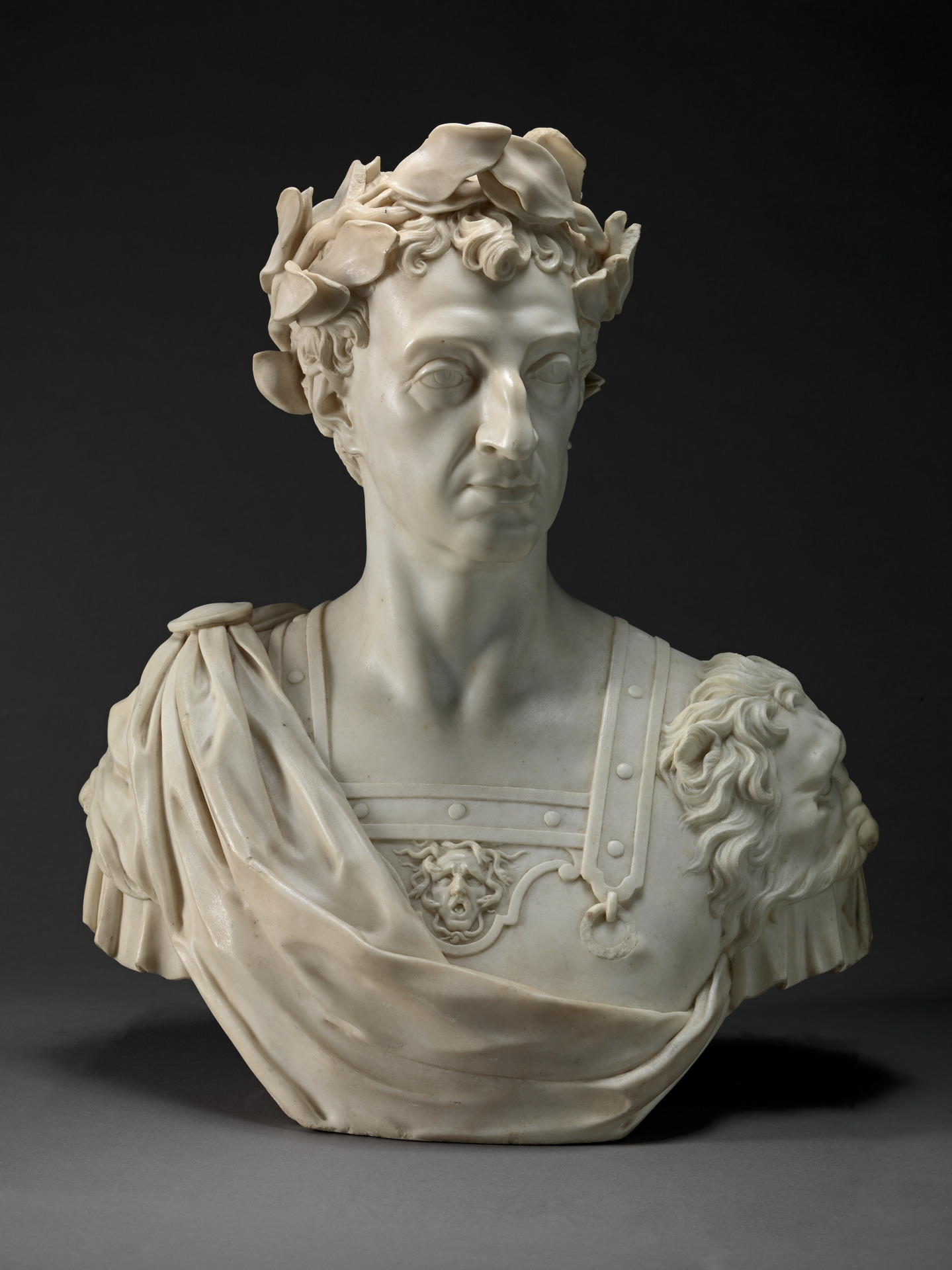
Marble bust of William III, ca. 1736, Yale Center for British Art, New Haven, Connecticut

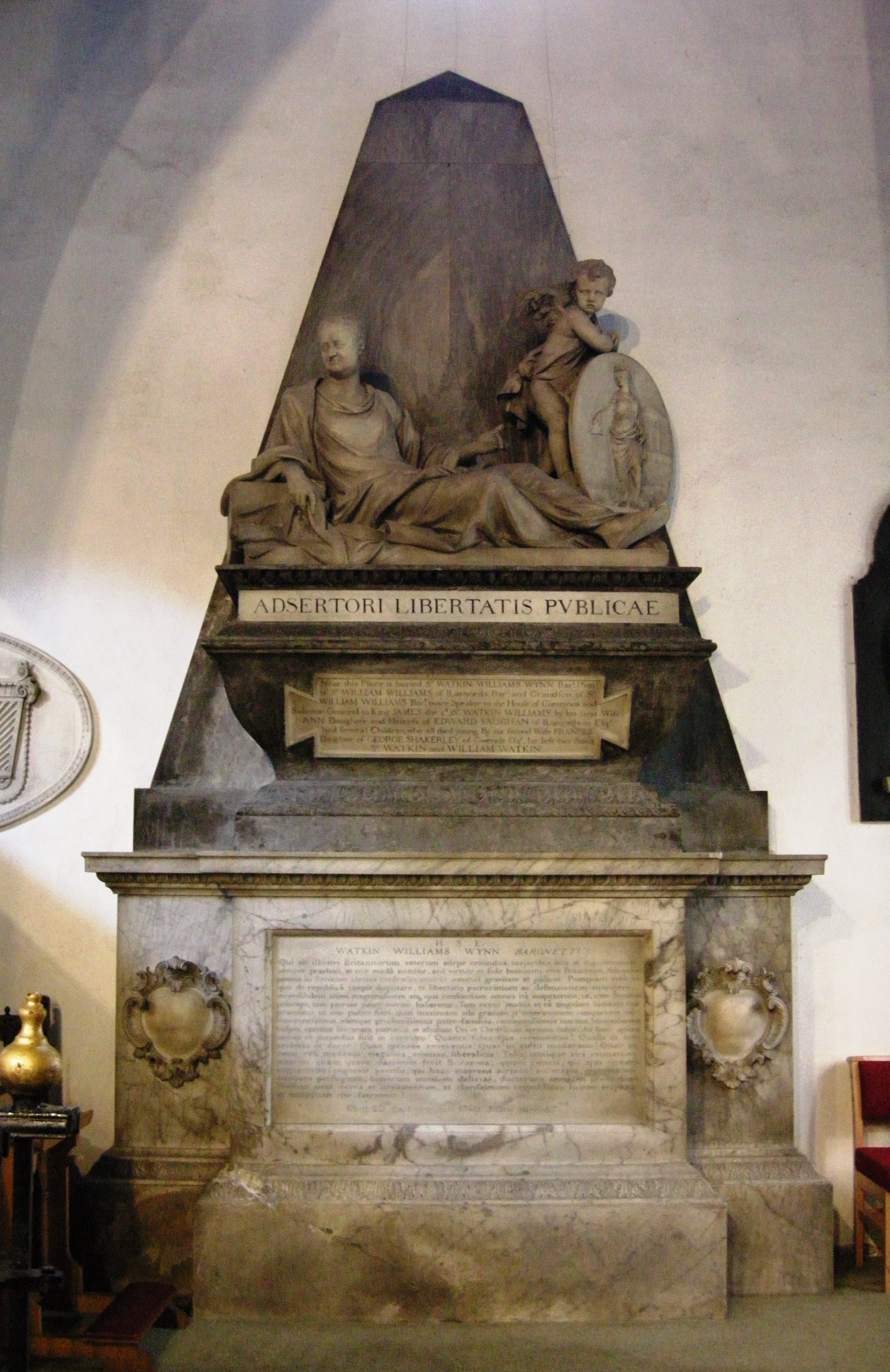
Tomb monument for Sir Watkin Williams-Wynn, Ruabon, Denbighshire, erected 1755

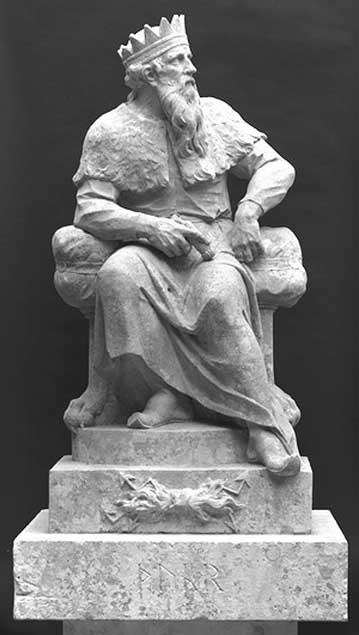
Thuner, originally in the gardens Stowe House now at the V&A Museum, London, England
