= Pieter Andreas Rijsbrack =

Flemish painter

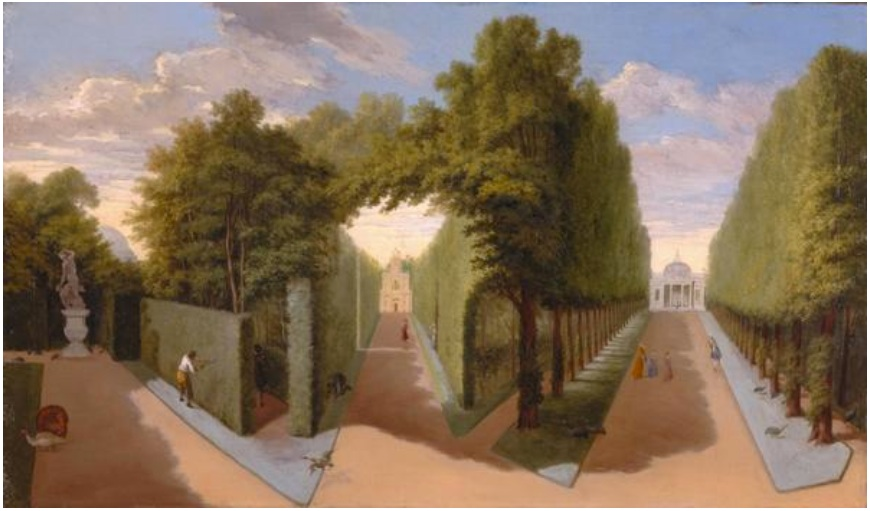
Chiswick House Gardens: A view of the Bagnio and Grand Allees

Pieter Andreas Rijsbrack (1685 or 1690 – 1748) (sometimes Anglicized as Peter Rysbrack) was a Flemish painter of still lifes and landscapes who was active in England in the first half of the 18th century. He is particularly known for launching the vogue of topographical views of English country houses and gardens. He was the older brother of the sculptor John Michael Rysbrack.

== Life ==
Pieter Andreas Rijsbrack was born in Paris as the son of the Antwerp landscape painter Pieter Rijsbraeck and his wife Genoveva Compagnon. His father had been working in Paris since c. 1678. Pieter Andreas moved with his parents to Antwerp around 1692. He learned to paint with his father and became a member of the Guild of St. Luke in Antwerp in 1711. He married the same year in Antwerp to Maria Anna van de Wee, the widow of the printmaker Cornelis Vermeulen. His wife died in 1718.

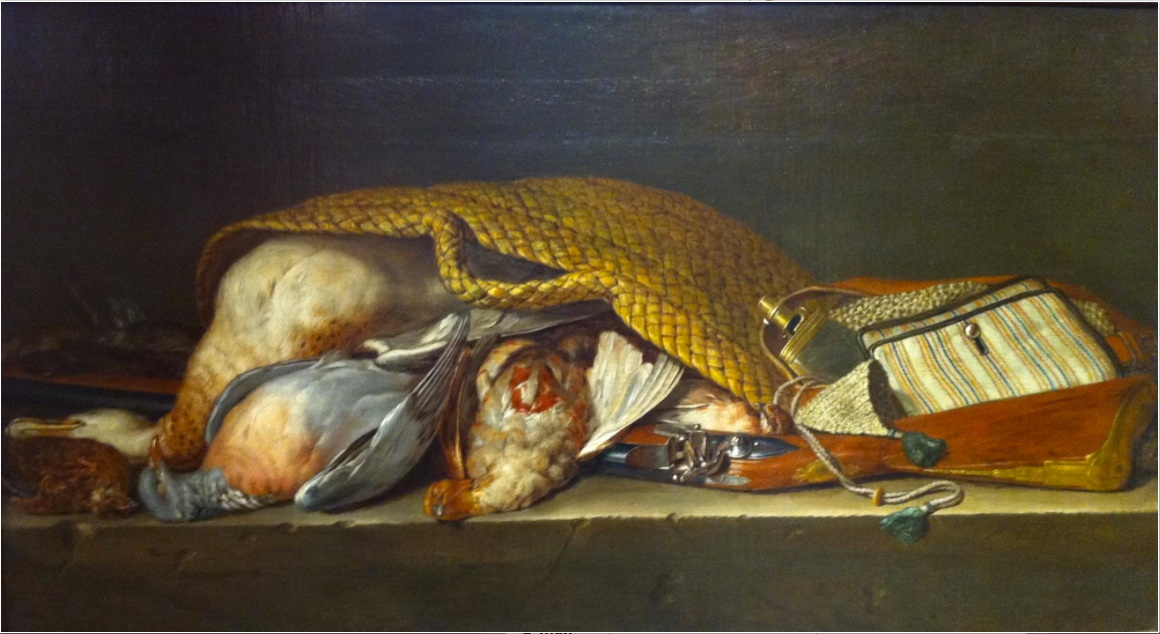
Still Life of Game

Pieter Andreas moved with his younger brother, the sculptor John Michael Rysbrack, to London around 1720. Pieter Andreas had more brothers who also became painters. One of these, the still life painter Gerard, joined him and John Michael in England.

John Michael Rysbrack became one of the leading sculptors in England and was particularly known for his portraits. As a sculptor to the elite, he was able to build a network of relationships with influential people in England. This served his brothers well as they were able to use these connections to gain commissions from prominent patrons.

One of Pieter Andreas most important commissions was the one he received from Lord Burlington to paint a series of country house portraits of Chiswick House. Rijsbrack thus took his place in a long tradition of Flemish painters who made topographical paintings of the estates of the British nobility which includes artists such as Jan Siberechts, Peter Tillemans and Hendrik Frans de Cort.

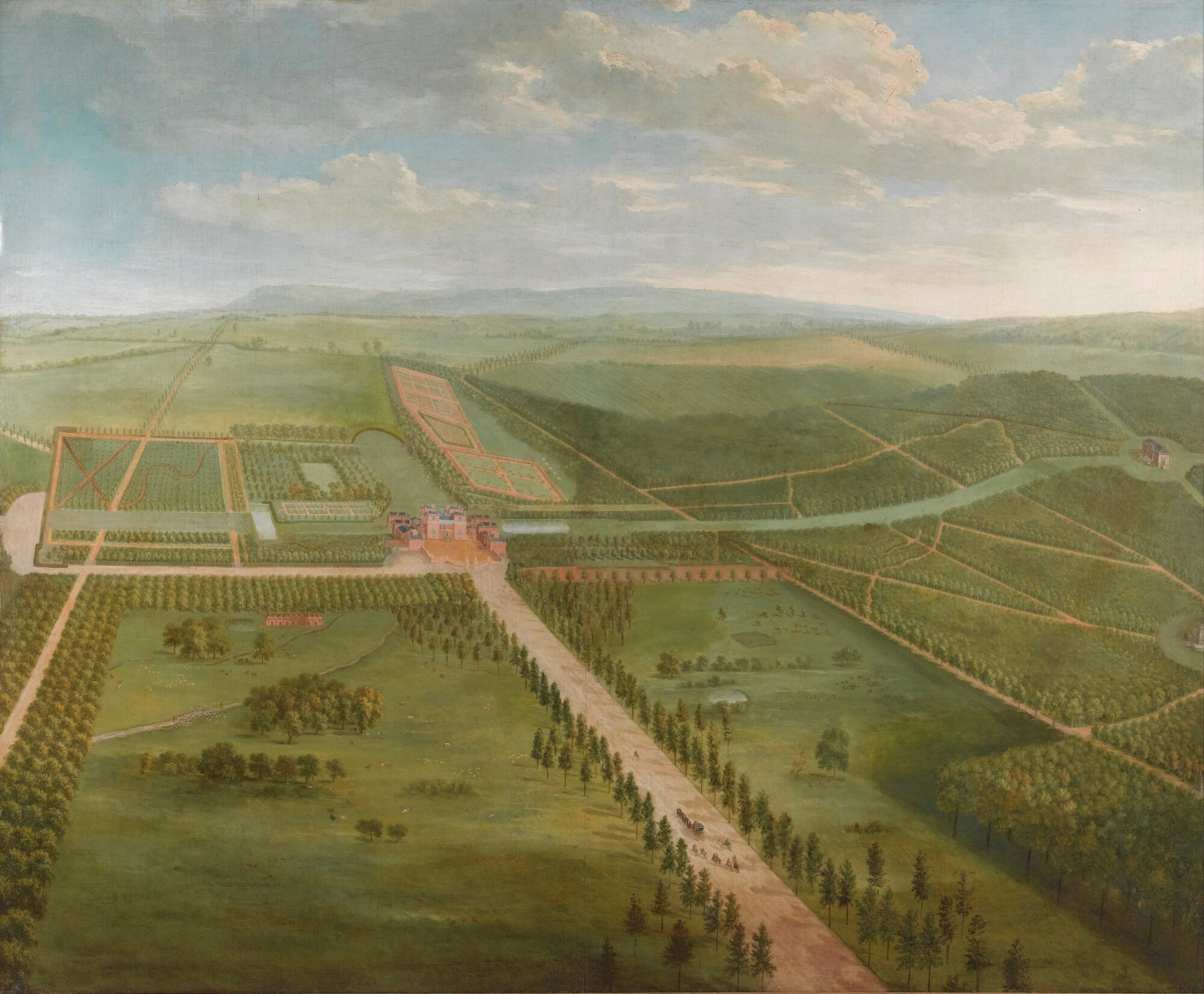
Prospect of Tottenham Park, Wiltshire

Pieter Andreas Rijsbrack died in London in October 1748, possibly of consumption.

== Work ==
He is known for his landscapes and still lifes. His still lifes cover the whole range of animal paintings, game pieces, fish pieces and fruit pieces.

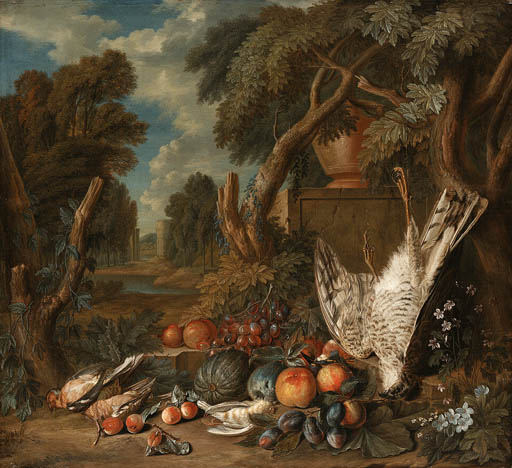
Fruit, dead Songbirds and a Kestrel on a forest floor, a river Landscape with a Castle beyond, by Pieter Andreas Rysbrack

The still lifes and game pieces where in the Flemish style.  An example is the Still Life of Vegetables, a Pineapple and Other Fruit with a Silver Platter on a Ledge (Corpus Christi College, Cambridge).

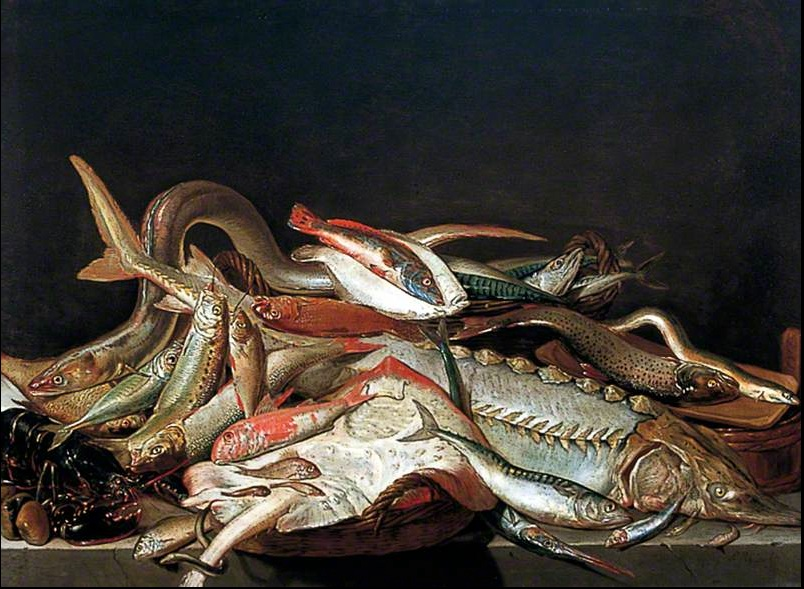
Fish

He also established a reputation with his topographical landscapes and portraits of country houses and gardens. He made two series of paintings of Chiswick House and Gardens upon the commission by Lord Burlington. The purpose of the paintings was to serve as a reminder to Lord Burlington of the progress of the work on the Palladian villa and its setting, which Burlington had designed himself. Work on Chiswick House and Gardens had commenced in 1717 and was completed in 1729. The paintings were probably displayed in Lord Burlington's various other properties such as Burlington House and at his Yorkshire country seat. The series of paintings had an important influence on the fashion for sets of garden views that emerged in the second quarter of the 18th century and gained further popularity with the rise of the picturesque movement.

Rijsbrack's work was also significant for its use of innovative ways of depicting the subject. He portrayed the house and gardens from different angles magnifying certain segments and adopting a somewhat exaggerated perspective. He could thus better illustrate the scenographic and topographical variety of the site. He also included scenes of animals, gardeners and 'polite society' in the landscape thus introducing French influences into English painting and adding an element of social discourse. Among his followers are John Rocque and Jacques Rigaud who both also worked at Chiswick. Rijsbrack's painting series forms an important historical document showing various phases of Lord Burlington's remodelling of the grounds at Chiswick before William Kent's interventions of the 1730s.

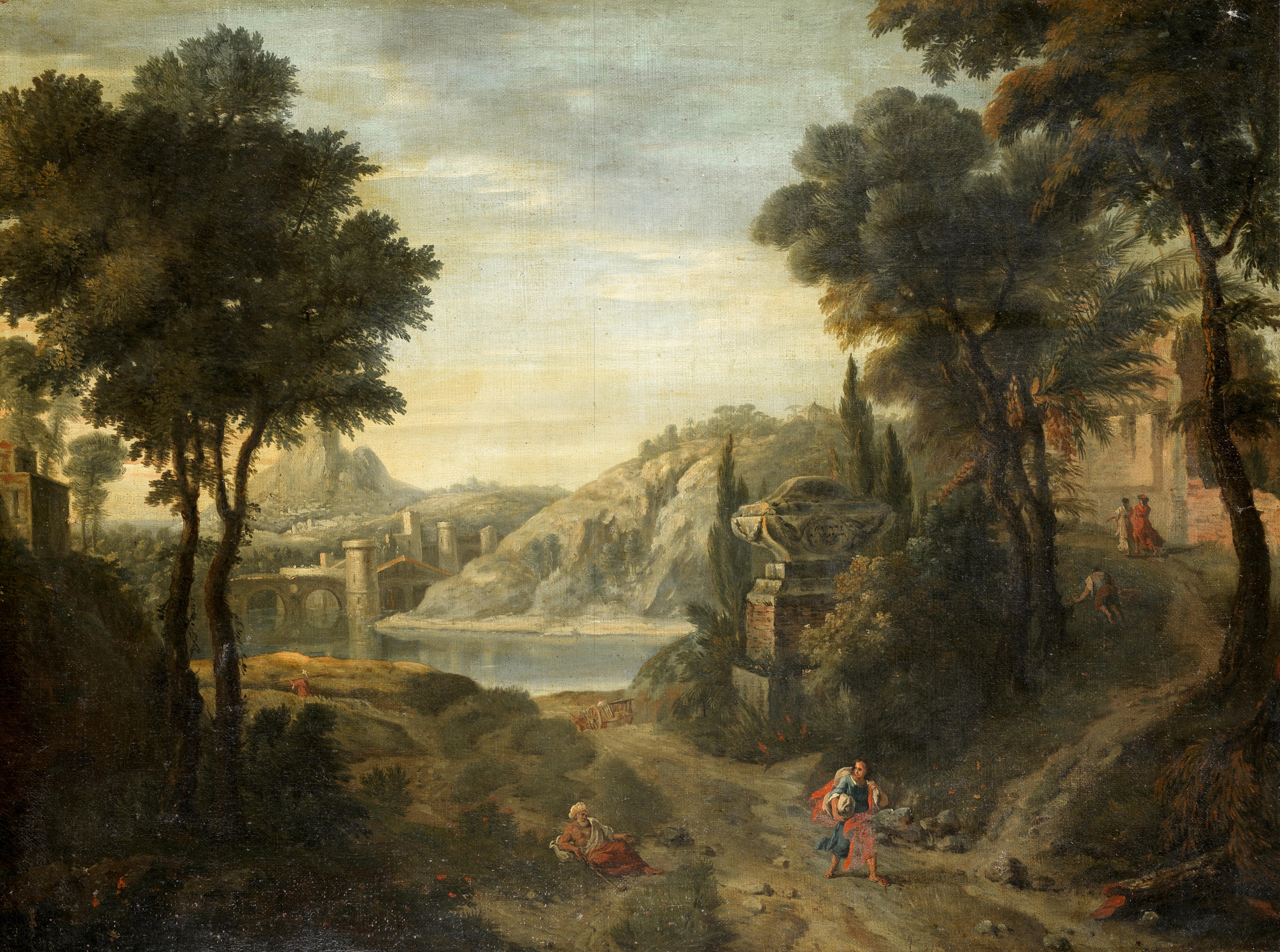
Travellers in a classical landscape

In 1735 Rijsbrack painted An Exact Draught and View of Mr Pope's House at Twickenham. He was possibly the first artist to paint Alexander Pope's villa from across the river. An engraved View of Mr Pope's House at Twickenham by Nathaniel Parr – the only print of Alexander Pope's Thames-side villa to be issued in the poet's lifetime – was made in 1735 after this painting or a drawing (untraced) by Rijsbrack.

Rijsbrack also received from Lord Burlington a commission to paint three views of Tottenham Park. The earliest one predates Burlington's reworking of the site, while the other two comprise a large bird-view prospect and a smaller view showing the Inigo Jones inspired rear portico.

Rijsbrack painted a bird-eye view of Richmond Ferry (Orleans House Gallery, London). The painting depicts the view from the Town Wharf next to the White Cross Inn.

At international auctions landscape paintings of Rijsbrack more reminiscent of the classicizing style of his father are regularly offered for sale. An example is the Travellers in a classical landscape. A work in a similar style entitled A Southern Landscape with Muleteers is part of the collection at the National Trust, Hatchlands.
