= Düsseldorf City Hall =

City hall in Düsseldorf, Germany

- Rathaus Düsseldorf
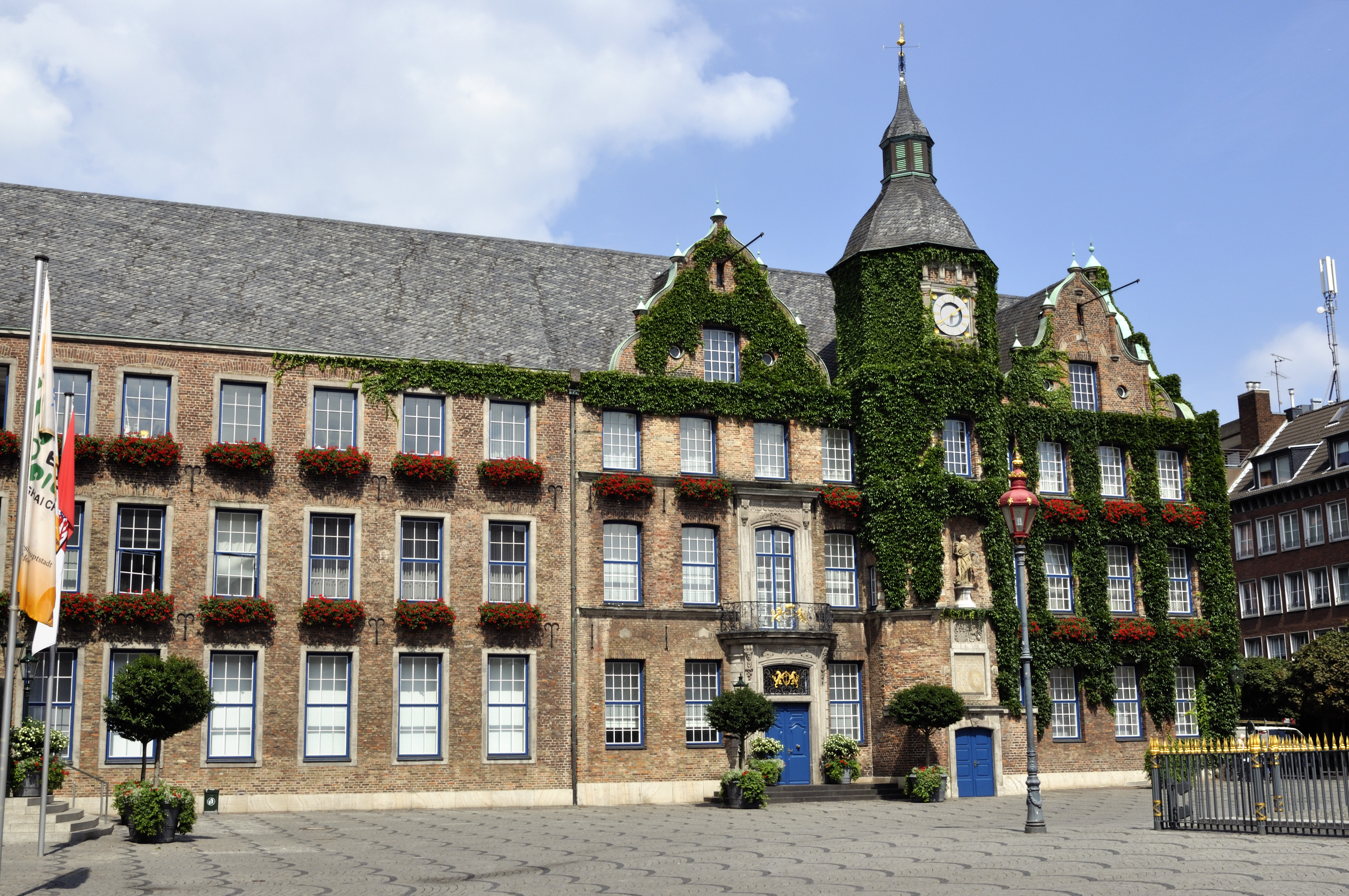
- The main frontage of the old town hall in August 2010

General information
- Type: City hall
- Architectural style: Renaissance Revival style
- Location: Düsseldorf, Germany
- Coordinates: 51.2260°N 6.7714°E
- Construction started: 1570
- Completed: 1573

Design and construction
- Architect: Heinrich Tussmann

The Düsseldorf City Hall (German: Rathaus Düsseldorf) is a municipal building in Düsseldorf, in western Germany, standing on Marktplatz.

== History ==
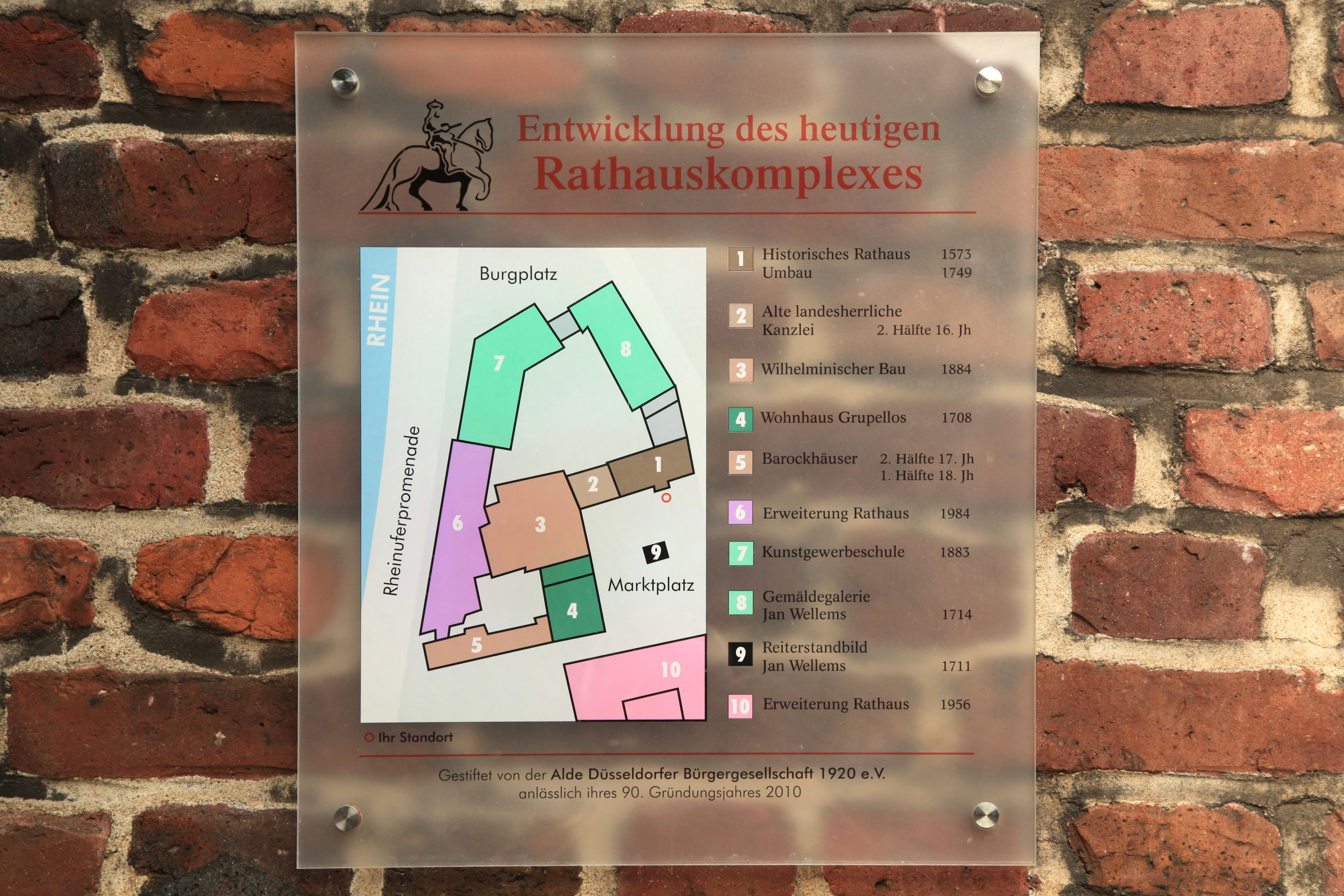
The development of today's town hall complex

The first town hall in Düsseldorf was probably located in a building opposite St. Lambert's Church that had previously served as a customs house. The second town hall, known as the house "Zum Schwarzen Horn" (At the Black Horn), was located on Ratinger Straße, and served as the town hall from 1470 to 1544. In 1545, the city acquired a building on Marktplatz which served the aldermen and the council as the third town hall.

The oldest part of the current complex, known as the Altes Rathaus (old town hall), was on the north side of Marktplatz. It was designed and built by a master builder, Heinrich Tussmann, in the Renaissance Revival style, using red brick, between 1570 and 1573. The design originally involved a symmetrical main frontage of nine bays facing onto Marktplatz (the right hand section of the current building). It featured, in the central bay, an octagonal, five-stage tower. The first stage involved a segmental-headed doorway, the second stage incorporated a stone panel, the third stage consisted of a niche containing a statue, the fourth stage incorporated a casement window and the fifth stage involved a clock. The tower was surmounted by a Gothic style frieze, a dome and a lantern. The building was fenestrated by casement windows on all three floors and the tower was flanked by stepped gables on both sides.

An equestrian statue by the sculptor, Gabriël Grupello, depicting Johann Wilhelm, Elector Palatine, was erected in the centre of Marktplatz in front of the old town hall in 1711. The old town hall also served as the assembly place of the Estates of the Duchy of Jülich-Berg until 1806.

A second wing, known as the Neues Rathaus (new town hall), was erected on the west side of Marktplatz. It was designed by Eberhard Westhofen in the Renaissance Revival style and built in red brick between 1884 and 1888. It originally featured a three-stage tower with a steep roof and a lantern. To the south of new town hall was the Grupello-Haus, which had been the home of Gabriël Grupello in the early 18th century and which was also later integrated into the complex. The new town hall was particularly badly damaged by the allied bombing of Germany during the Second World War and was subsequently restored to a simplified design.

A third wing known as Verwaltungsgebäude (administration building) was built on the south side of Marktplatz. It was designed by Julius Schulte-Frohlinde in the modern style and built in brick between 1952 and 1956. It went on to accommodate the treasury department of the council. Queen Elizabeth II, accompanied by Prince Philip, Duke of Edinburgh, visited the complex and met the council leaders in May 1965.

A fourth wing, which had formed part of the Gemäldegalerie Düsseldorf (Düsseldorf Art Gallery), to the north of the pre-existing buildings was added in 1984. A fifth wing, which had previously formed part of the Kunstgewerbeschule Düsseldorf (Düsseldorf School of Applied Arts) and was also located to the north of the pre-existing buildings was added around the same time.

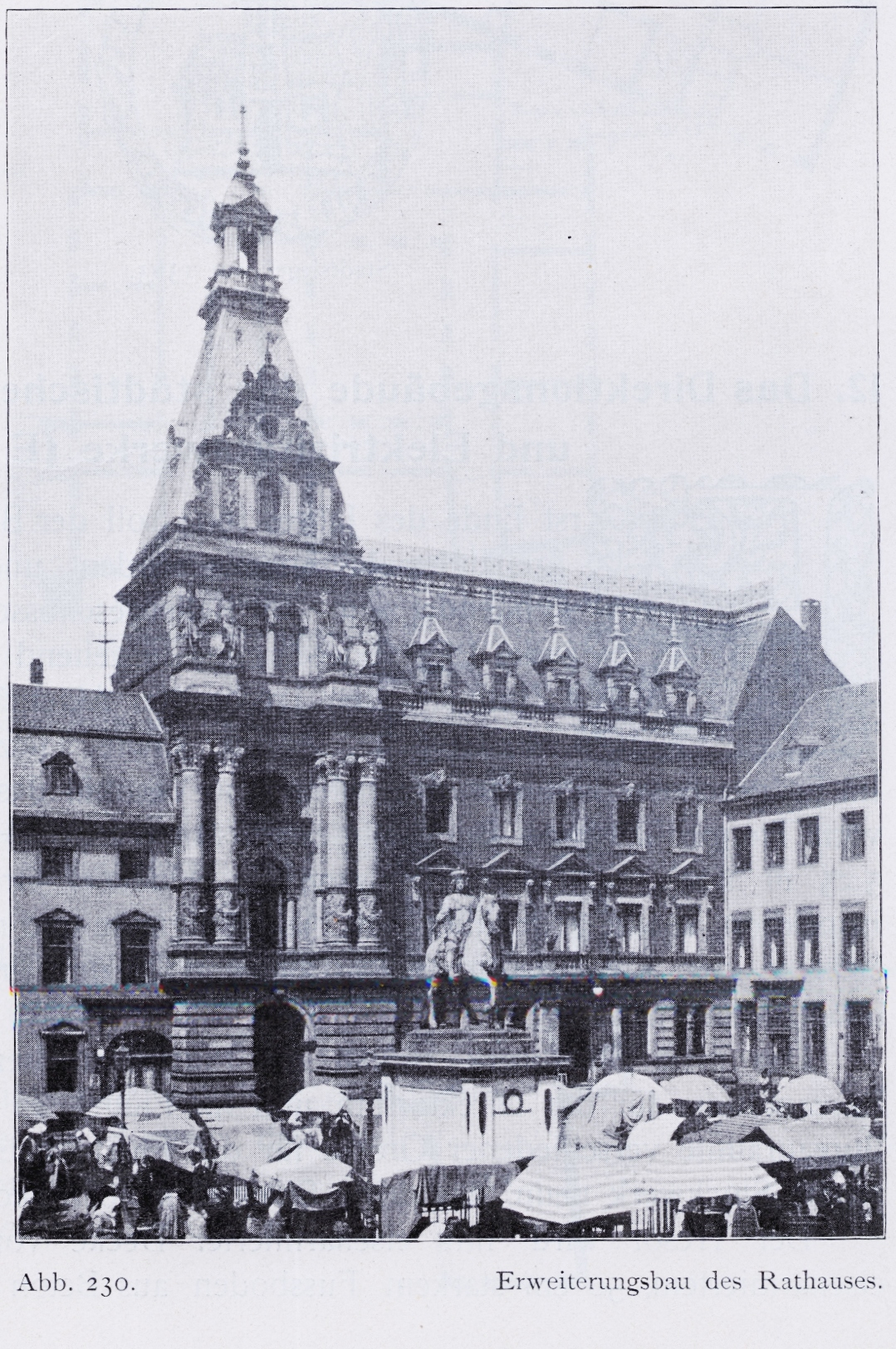
The Neues Rathaus (new town hall), as originally built

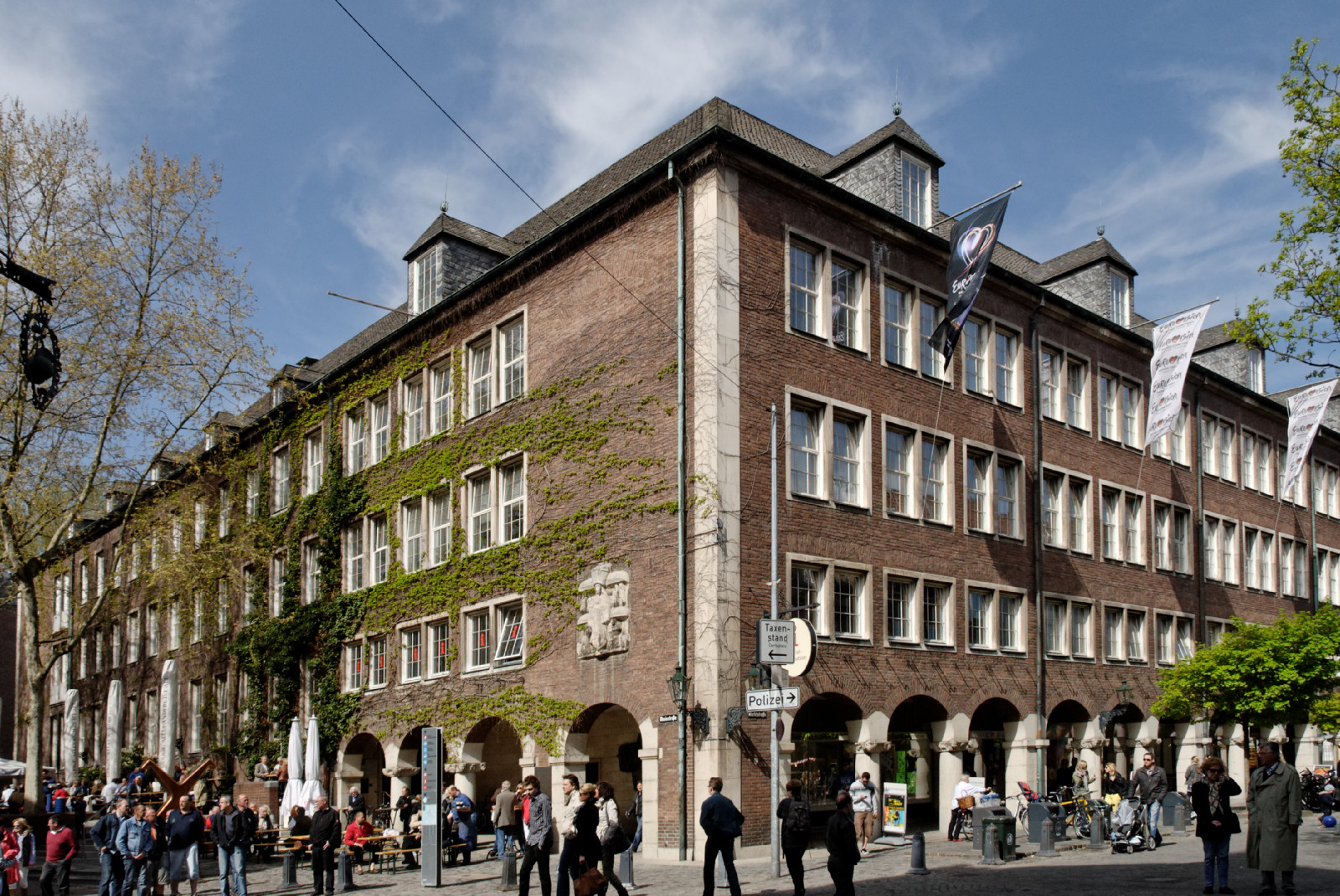
The Verwaltungsgebäude (administration building)

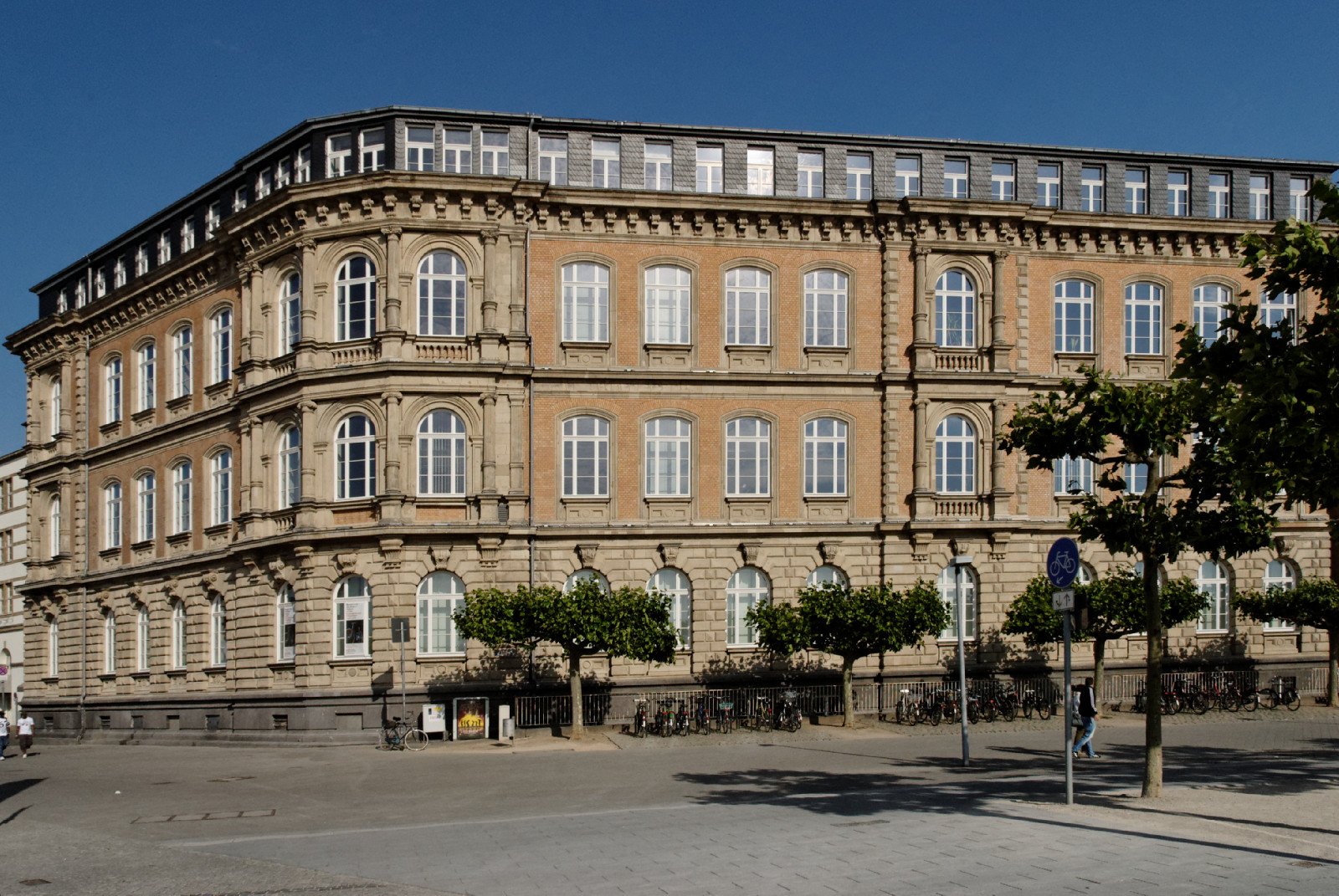
The former Gemäldegalerie Düsseldorf (Düsseldorf Art Gallery)

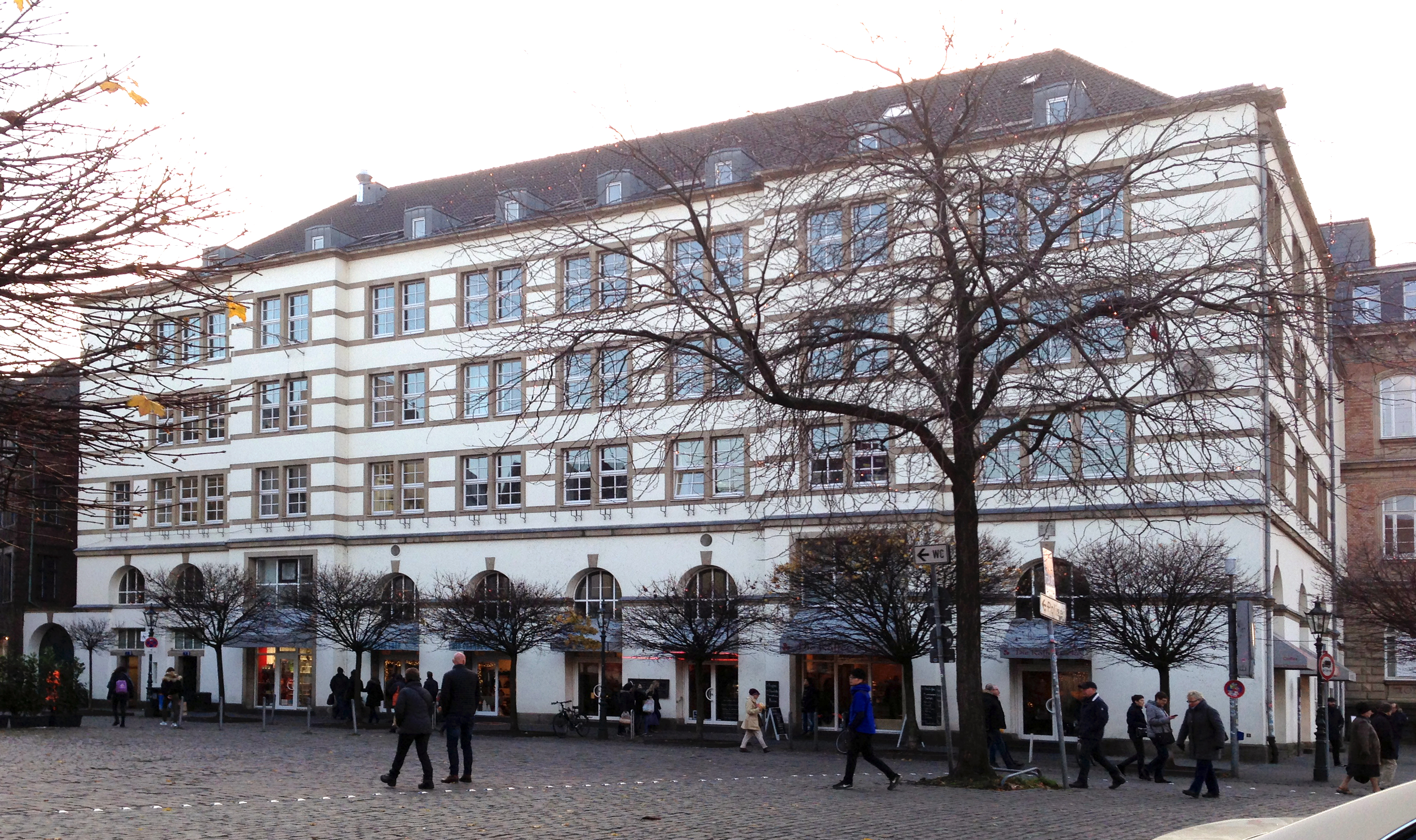
The former Kunstgewerbeschule Düsseldorf (Düsseldorf School of Applied Arts)
