= Jan van Delen =

Flemish sculptor (1635/36–1703)

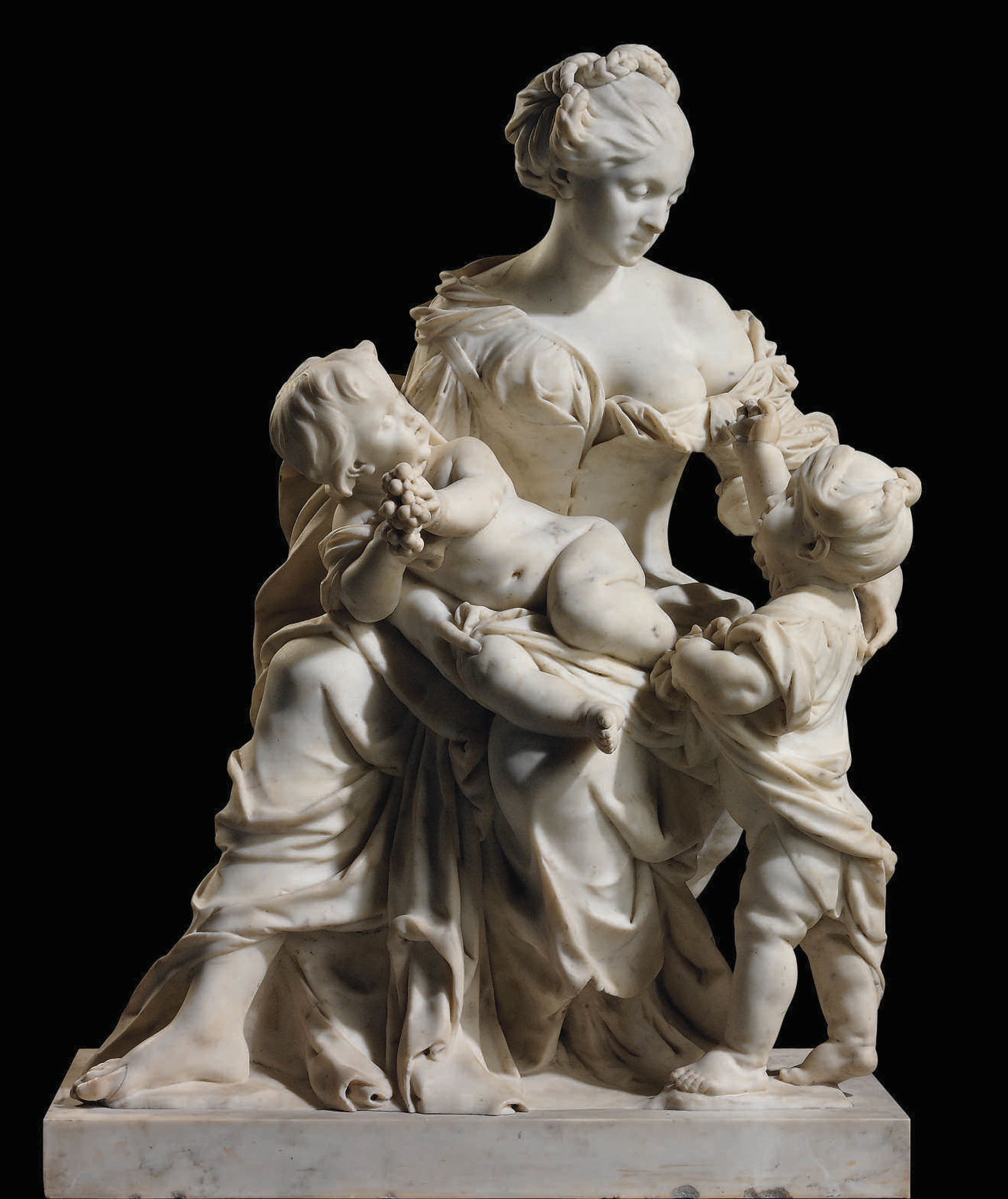
Caritas

Jan van Delen (1635/1636 in Brussels – 12 March 1703 in Brussels) was a Flemish sculptor who is mainly known for his Baroque church sculptures, allegorical scenes, funeral monuments and portraits. He was principally active in Brussels where he popularized the Flemish Baroque style in sculpture.

== Life ==
Details about his life are scarce. In a document in the Brussels city archives dated 19 June 1664, van Delen is reported declaring that his father had been a falconer in the service of the governors of the Spanish Netherlands for more than 25 years, he had from a young age and already for about 20 years practised the art of sculpting in Brussels, the Dutch Republic, Germany and, for the longest period, in Italy as well as in other places. The document also states that Jan van Delen was born in Brussels as the son of Hendrick. The document thus proves that he was born in Brussels. The time of his birth is not entirely clear but was likely in the middle of the 1630s, assuming he commenced his apprenticeship when he was around 10 years of age. The statement also indicates that he did not train with a master and was not a pupil in Brussels. In 1664 Jan obtained the poorterschap (citizenship) of Brussels for free in return for the performance of certain unspecified services.

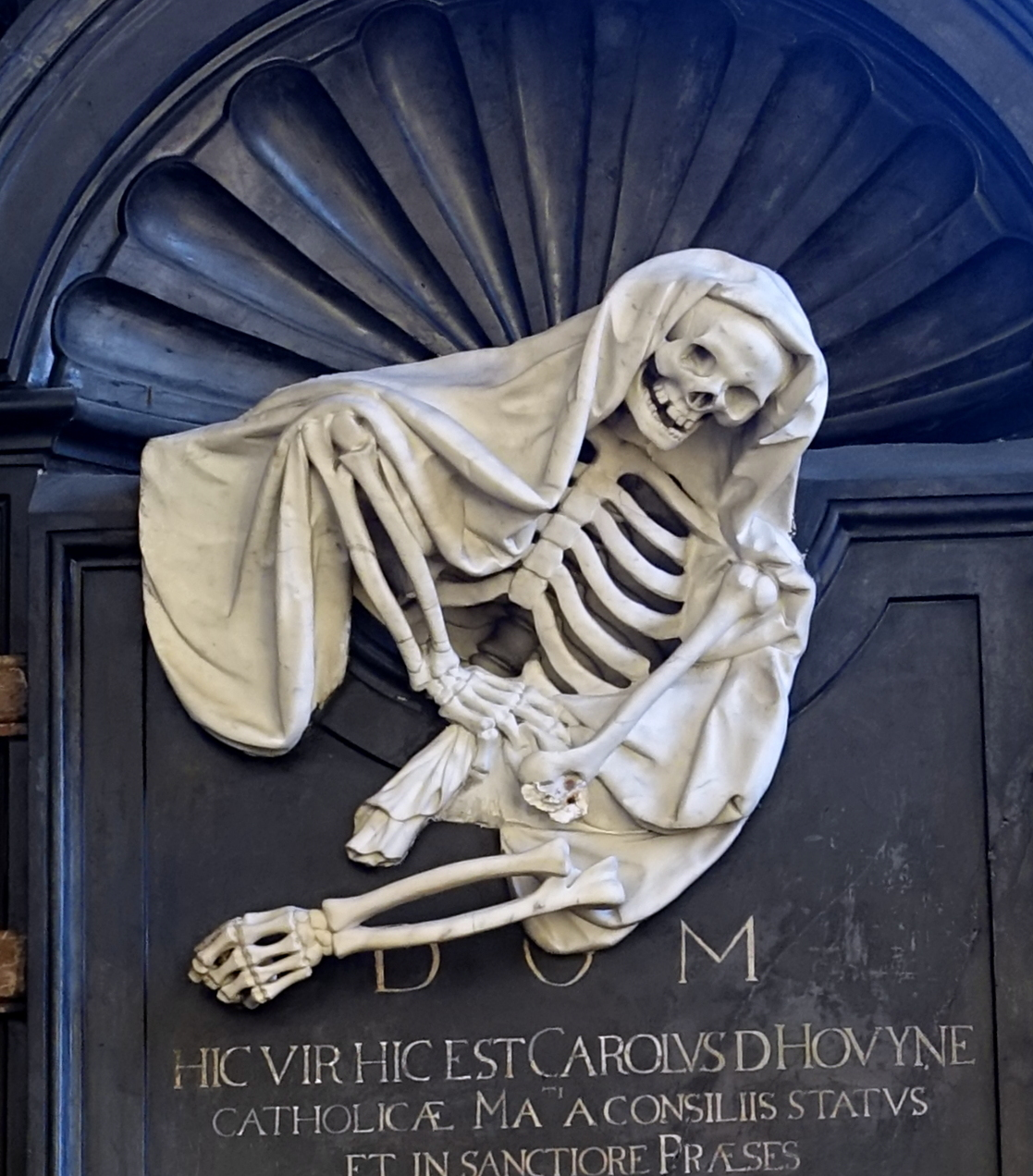
Charles d'Hovyne's mausoleum, Our Lady of the Chapel, Brussels

Art historians have speculated in the past that van Delen was the pupil of Lucas Faydherbe, a prominent sculptor and architect from Mechelen who had trained in Rubens' workshop and also worked on commissions in Brussels. No documents exist that prove such an apprenticeship. Van Delen later collaborated with Faydherbe and it may have been in this way that he familiarised himself with the Flemish Baroque style popularised by Rubens. He was in 1664 admitted as a master in the guild of the Vier Gekroonden, the Brussels guild of masons, sculptors, stonemasons and shale masons. On 24 June 1666 he married in the St. Rumbold's Cathedral in Mechelen Anna Barbara Faydherbe, the daughter of Lucas Faydherbe. The couple established their home in the Saint Gaugericus parish of Brussels. They had 14 children who were all baptized in the local parish church.

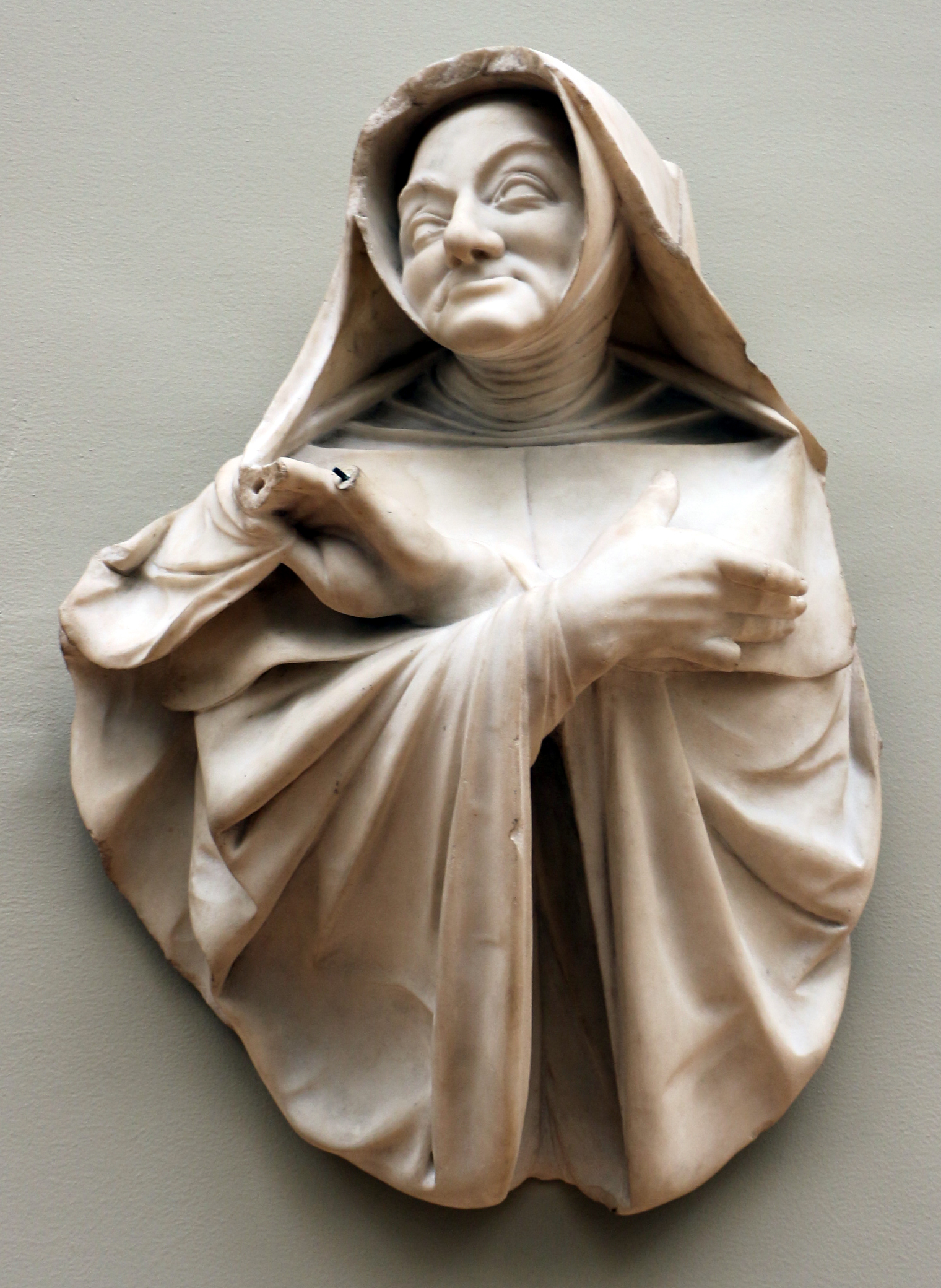
Fragment of a funerary monument

Faydherbe had in 1651 obtained a commission to create a monument in the funerary chapel of Duke Lamoral of Thorn and Taxis (in the Church of Our Lady of Victories at the Sablon in Brussels). Although Faydherbe was fired from his commission in 1653, the work on the chapel was continued by court architect Vincent Anthony until its completion in 1676. The result was a richly decorated, octagonal chapel decorated with black marble. Van Delen along with Jérôme Duquesnoy the Younger, Gabriel Grupello and Mattheus van Beveren worked on the execution of the sculptural project from about 1673 to 1678. Van Delen contributed two marble statues, one of which represents Charity. King Charles II of Spain, then sovereign of the Southern Netherlands, bestowed on him the title of court sculptor by letters patent dated 4 September 1675.

The well-known war criminal Duke of Villeroi ordered the French army to conduct from 13 to 15 August 1695 a whole-scale bombardment of the undefended city of Brussels, thereby turning a third of the buildings into ruins and completely destroying the central city square, the Grand-Place. In 1698, the Corporation of Haberdashers which was located on the Grand-Place commissioned van Delen and Marc de Vos to assist with the rebuilding of their building called In den Vos ("The Fox") on the Grand-Place. Van Delen made the sculptures in the meeting room, while de Vos was in charge of executing the decorations of the facade.

He worked mainly in Brussels where he had several pupils. One known pupil, Jan Michaels, continued to work in his Baroque style. He died on 10 or 12 March 1703 in Brussels where he was buried in the Saint Gaugericus Church in Brussels, which was demolished in the period from 1798 to 1801 during the French occupation of the Southern Netherlands.

== Work ==
Van Delen created church sculptures, allegorical scenes, funeral monuments and portraits. About 15 works are currently attributed to him of which 8 have been preserved. He worked mainly for the local churches and religious institutions in and around Brussels. Most of his known works are executed in marble and to a lesser extent wood. He worked in the Flemish Baroque style which he had mastered through his collaborations with Faydherbe, who in turn had developed it during his training in Rubens' workshop in Antwerp.

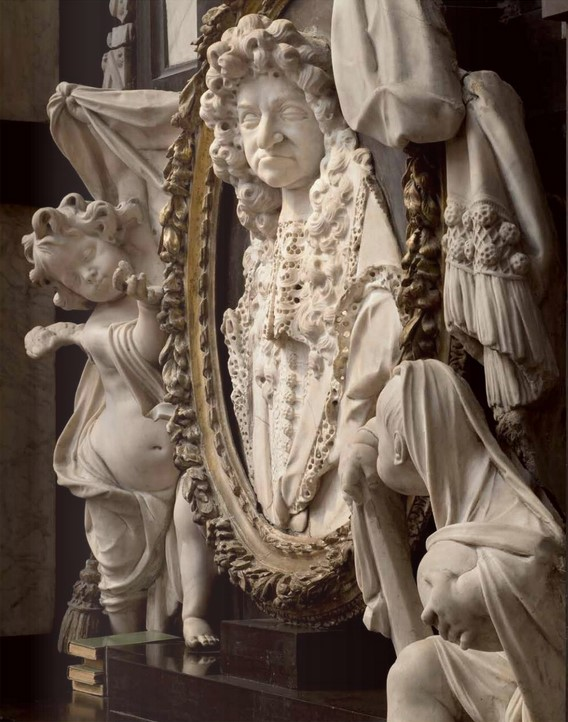
Portrait of Philippe-François d’Ennetières

His only signed and dated work is the funeral monument of the family d'Ennetières in the Cathedral of St. Michael and St. Gudula of Brussels. It consists of two superimposed monuments which commemorate two individuals from the same lineage and were made at different times. The epitaph for Jacques d’Ennetières which is in the upper part of the monument is documented through a contract including a modello dated 27 April 1675. At the centre of this epitaph is a marble slab with a funerary inscription surrounded by a molded gilded wooden frame, with eight arms of noble families. Two allegorical figures flank the marble slab: Vigilance and the Prudence, which are rendered in an idealized form. Vigilance, on the left, holds a palm in her hands and at her feet stands a rooster. On the right is Prudence who originally held a mirror in her left hand, which has now disappeared. At the top of the structure stands the bust of Jacques d’Ennetières inside a niche. He is represented with a worried look, wrinkles at the corner of his eyes, a sunken nose and wavy medium-length hair falling on his shoulders. The memorial of his son Philippe-François d'Ennetières, executed in 1690, carries van Delen's signature on the left-side of the base of the sarcophagus. It is in the form of a triumphal arch delimited on the sides by large pilasters. In the center of the structure, the epitaph of the deceased in white marble is framed by black marble and a series of sixteen coats of arms. The inscription is surmounted by a pediment itself topped by the coat of arms of sarcophagusthe deceased and his wife, Marie Obert. The whole is supported by two dogs. Below the epitaph, a bust of Philippe-François d'Ennetières is sculpted in bass-relief, inserted in a medallion created by a gilded wooden frame decorated with laurel leaves. He is represented turned three quarters to the right and wearing a wig with curls falling down his shoulders and a shirt with an openwork lace jabot and a coat. The upper part of the medallion is covered with a white double-foiled sheet supported by two angels.

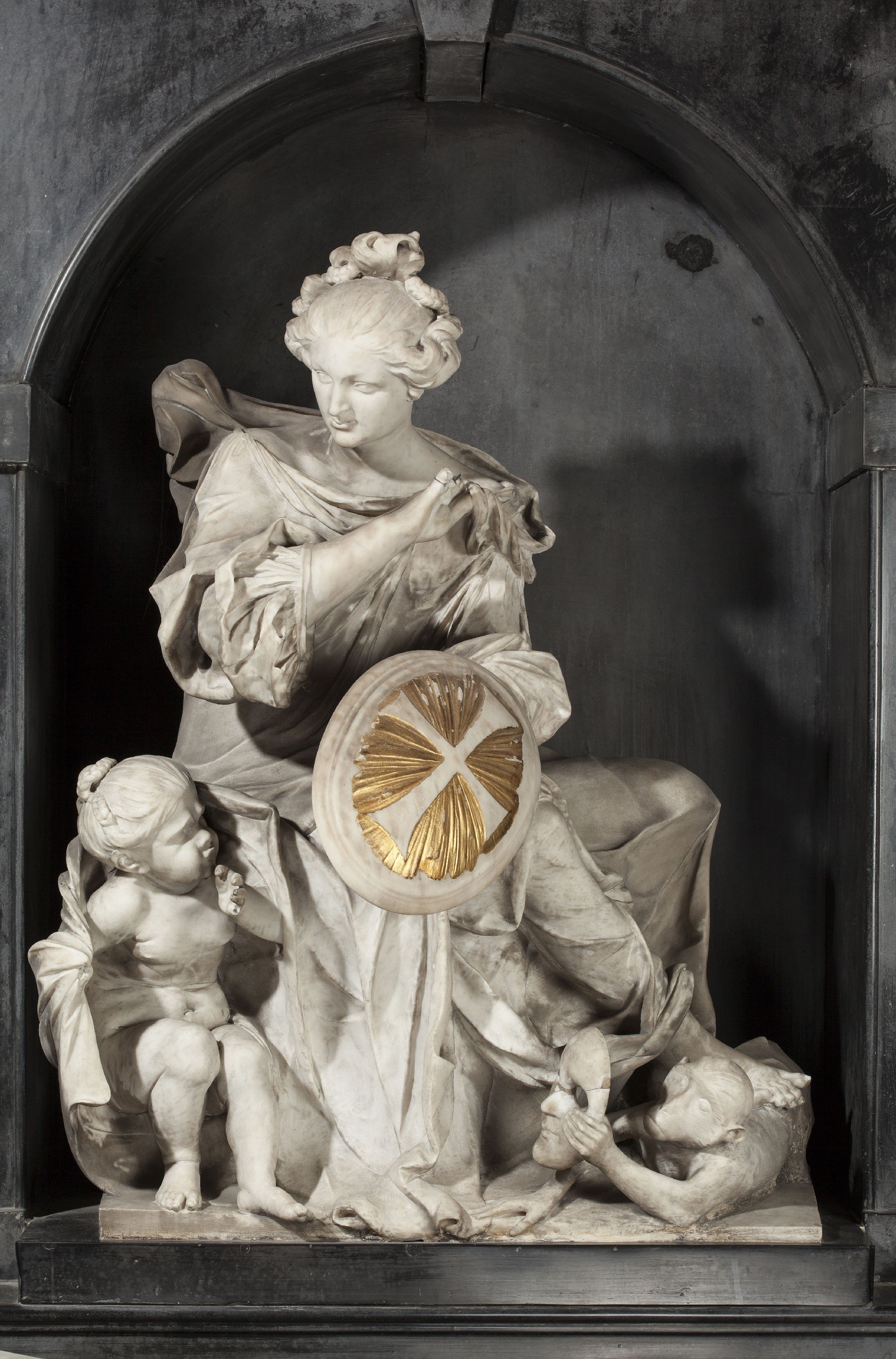
Allegory of Veritas (Truth)

As the funeral monument of the family d'Ennetières can be firmly attributed to van Delen it has been used to make further attributions. Other works have been attributed to him on the basis of contemporary documents. One important feature of his oeuvre that can be identified from the funeral monument of the family d'Ennetières is that it is intended to be viewed from a particular angle. When viewed from another than the intended angle of view, the figures may appear deformed.

Another funeral monument by van Delen is the mausoleum of Charles d'Hovyne executed in 1671 (base added in 1840) for the Church of Our Lady of the Chapel in Brussels. Charles d'Hovyne was president of the Privy Council of the Habsburg Netherlands. The mausoleum is made of white and black marble. The statues, of white marble, represent Justice, Steadfastness, Prudence and Strength. At the top is the bust of Charles d'Hovyne.

Van Delen collaborated from about 1673 to 1678 on the decorative project for the funerary chapel of Duke Lamoral of Thorn and Taxis (in the Church of Our Lady of Victories at the Sablon in Brussels). This decorative project was initially under the direction of his father-in-law Faydherbe. He created two allegorical figures representing Charity (Caritas) and Truth (Veritas), which were placed in niches in the chapel with two other allegorical sculptures of Hope and Faith executed by Gabriël Grupello. The Charity and Faith (Fides) sculptures were stolen at the end of the 18th century during one of the occupations of the Southern Netherlands by the French. Charity was rediscovered in a French private collection two centuries later and returned to Belgium after a sale at Christie's in 2012. The statue group shows charity personified by a seated young woman who has one putto on her lap and is looking at another putto who stands in front of her while raising an arm. The figures are united through there movements and express the selflessness of motherly love. The partially uncovered breast of the woman refers to the gift of the mother milk, the source of life for the next generation. The representation closely resembles the religious representations of the Virgo lactans in which the Virgin Mary is shown breastfeeding the infant Jesus. The bunch of grapes in the hands of one of the putti symbolizes the blood of Christ, which according to the Catholic faith was shed to save humanity from sin. The statue group of Truth (Veritas) by van Delen is placed in the niche of the lost statue group of Faith (Fides).
