= Grupello-Haus =

Coordinates: 51°13′32″N 6°46′18″E

The Grupello-Haus (Grupello house) is a three-storey building located at 4 Marktplatz, Düsseldorf, North Rhine-Westphalia, Germany. The original size of the building was likely half of its current size.

== History ==
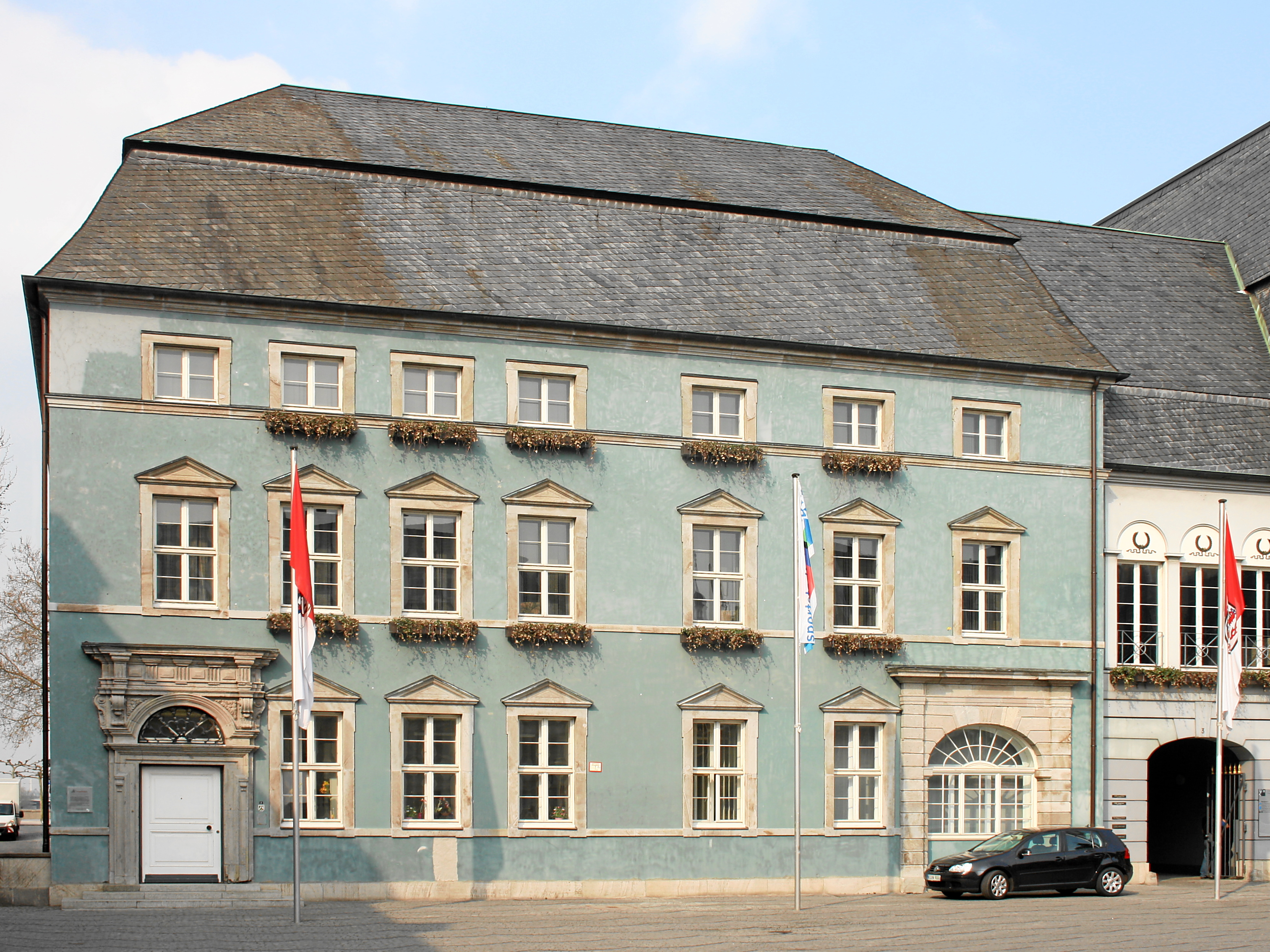
The Grupello-Haus in 2010

It is believed to have been designed by the Italian architect Matteo Alberti (architect) in 1706 for Duke Johann Wilhelm.

The Duke gave the house to his Flemish court sculptor Gabriël Grupello in 1708 and the name of the house is derived from this. Grupello carried out an important reconstruction of the building. He used the house as the living quarters of his family and partially as a studio. Originally, two female busts representing the Greek goddesses Artemis and Aphrodite presumed to be by Grupello were placed above the portal. The original bronze statues are now in the local Stadtmuseum Landeshauptstadt Düsseldorf and have been replaced by two concrete cast replicas.

In the year 1748 Elector Karl Theodor acquired the house and leased it to the painter and later Academy Director Lambert Krahe. From 1769 Governor Duke von Efferen lived in the house, which is why it is also called Gouvernementshaus (Government House). Later, the police department was housed in the building for some time. In 1818 it became property of Düsseldorf city through a donation by Prussia.

Heavily damaged in the war, the house was rebuilt in a simplified form. Nothing is left from the original interior. In 1969, a new meeting room of the town hall was opened in the house and it is now used as the meeting venue for the city council.
