= Michiel van der Voort the Elder =

Flemish sculptor and draftsman

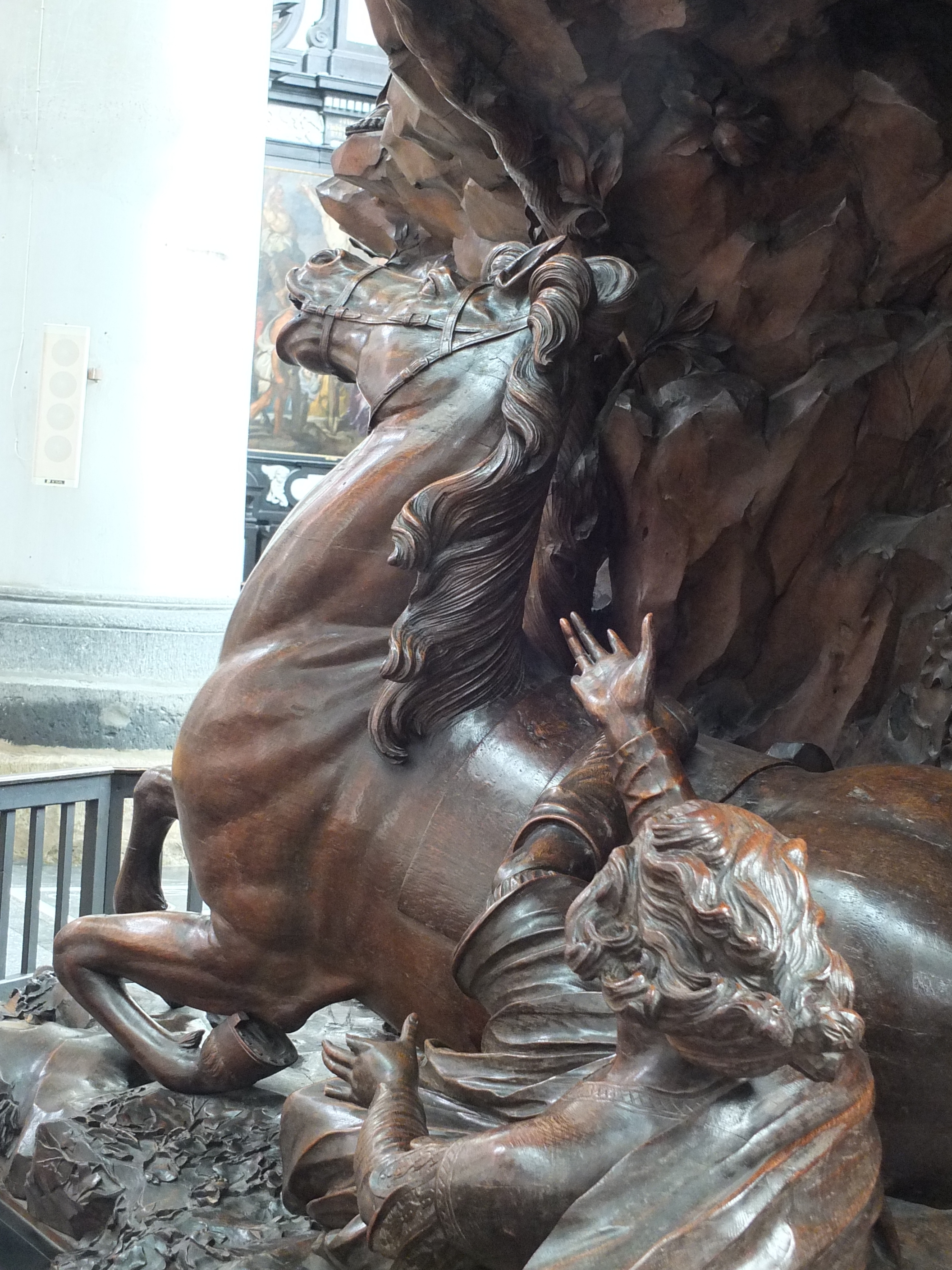
Detail of pulpit in the St. Rumbold's Cathedral, Mechelen

Michiel van der Voort the Elder, Michiel van der Voort (I) or Michiel Vervoort the Elder, nickname Welgemaeckt (Antwerp, 3 January 1667 – Antwerp, buried on 8 December 1737) was a Flemish sculptor and draftsman, who is best known for the Baroque church furniture which he made for the principal churches in Flanders. He also produced secular works, particularly of mythological and allegorical subjects. His work expresses both late Baroque exuberance and the quest for the simplicity of Classicism. His oeuvre shows the influence of Michelangelo, François Duquesnoy and Rubens. He trained many members of the next generation of Flemish sculptors.

== Life ==
Michiel van der Voort was born on 3 January 1667 and was baptized on 9 January 1667 in the Church of Our Lady South in Antwerp. His father Petrus or Pieter was a gilder. In 1680, Michiel became a member of the pious bachelor society, de 'Sodaliteit van de Bejaerde Jongmans', a fraternity for bachelors established by the Jesuit order. Michiel van der Voort is believed to have been initially an apprentice of possibly Jan Cosijn and later certainly of Pieter Scheemaeckers. In the guild year 1689-1690 he became a 'wijnmeester' ('wine master', a free master who was the son of an existing member) of the Antwerp Guild of Saint Luke.

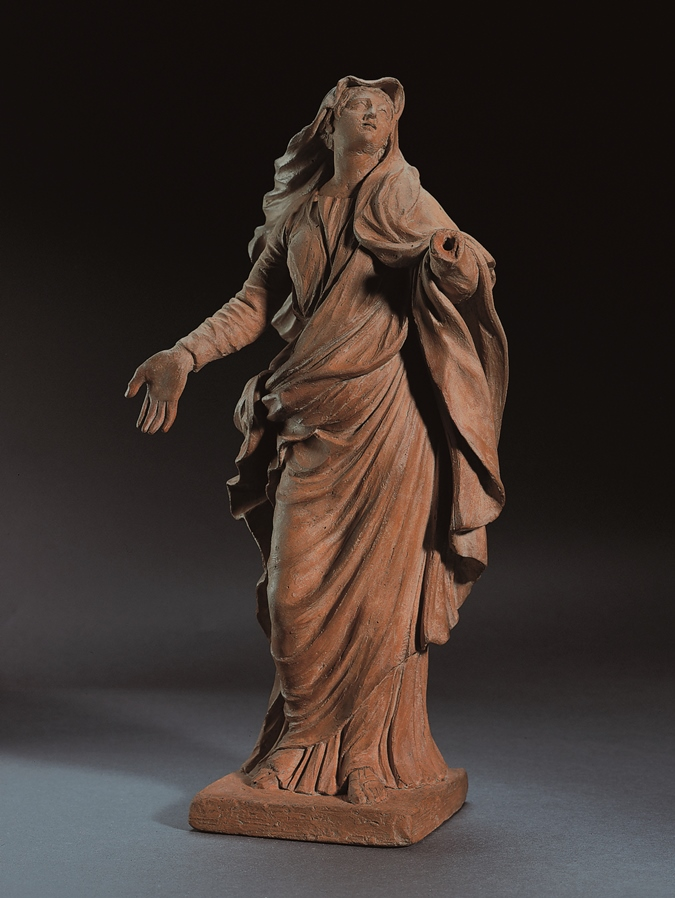
Model for a statue of the Virgin

Not long after becoming a master, he made the study trip to Italy that many Flemish artists of his time made. In Rome he joined the Bentvueghels, an association of mostly Dutch and Flemish artists working in Rome, which had mainly a social function. On joining, each new member was given a nickname. This so-called 'bentnaam' (bent name) was based on a striking trait of the artist in question. Van der Voort's nickname in the Bentveughels was 'Welgemaeckt' ('Well-made'). He also carved his name in the wall of the Mausoleum of Santa Costanza where the members would usually congregate when inducting a new member.

He likely returned to Antwerp in 1693 as he had pupils registered in the records of the Antwerp Guild of Saint Luke from the Guild year 1694–95. In 1700 he married Elisabeth Verbeckt or Verberckt. They had five children of whom Michiel became a sculptor and painter. Michiel the Elder's sister married the brother of his wife. They had a son called Jacob or Jacques Verbeckt who became a prominent wood sculptor in France. His wife died in 1708 or 1709.

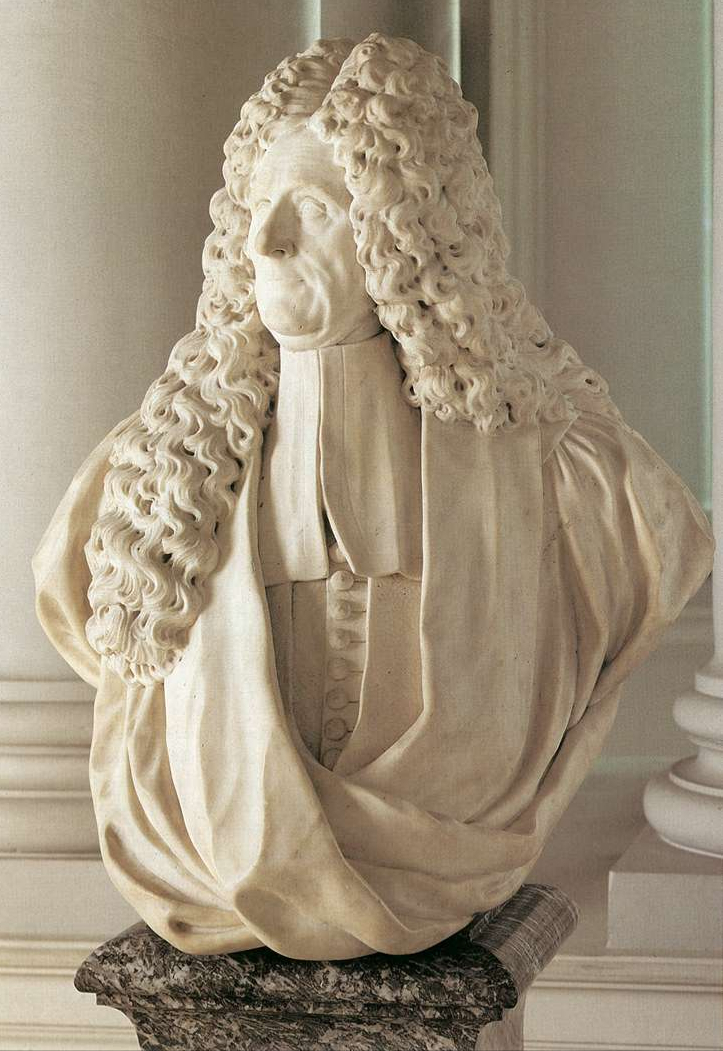
Bust portrait of Jacobus Franciscus van Caverson

He was able to secure many commissions including for funerary monuments, pulpits, confessionals and statutes of saints. He was particularly linked to the St. James' Church, Antwerp and he was a member of its Venerabel Kapel ('Venerable Chapel'). He provided many of the interior decorations for this church. In 1701 he created one of his first masterpieces with the epitaph of Michiel Peeters on the eastern wall of the St. James' Church. He also worked as a designer for the Antwerp silversmiths. His fame was such that the First Duke of Marlborough ordered from him two life-size marble statues of Bacchus and Flora for the main hall at Blenheim Palace. He also made a portrait bust of the Duke, who may have ordered these works during his exile in Europe.

Van der Voort operated a large workshop and trained many pupils. They included his son Michiel, Laurys Gillis, Jan Josef Horemans the Elder, Vincent Mattheyssens, Michiel van Balen, Francois Braeckmans, Rumoldus Juret, Ludovicus van der Linden, Carel Bieret and Anthoni Gillis. Jan Baptist Xavery also trained in his workshop.

He was buried on 8 December 1737 in Antwerp.

== Works ==
Van der Voort was a versatile sculptor who worked in many materials including marble, wood and stucco. He created mainly church furniture and funeral monuments. He also made some works with secular subject matter mainly derived from mythology or with allegorical figures. He further worked as a designer for the local silversmiths.

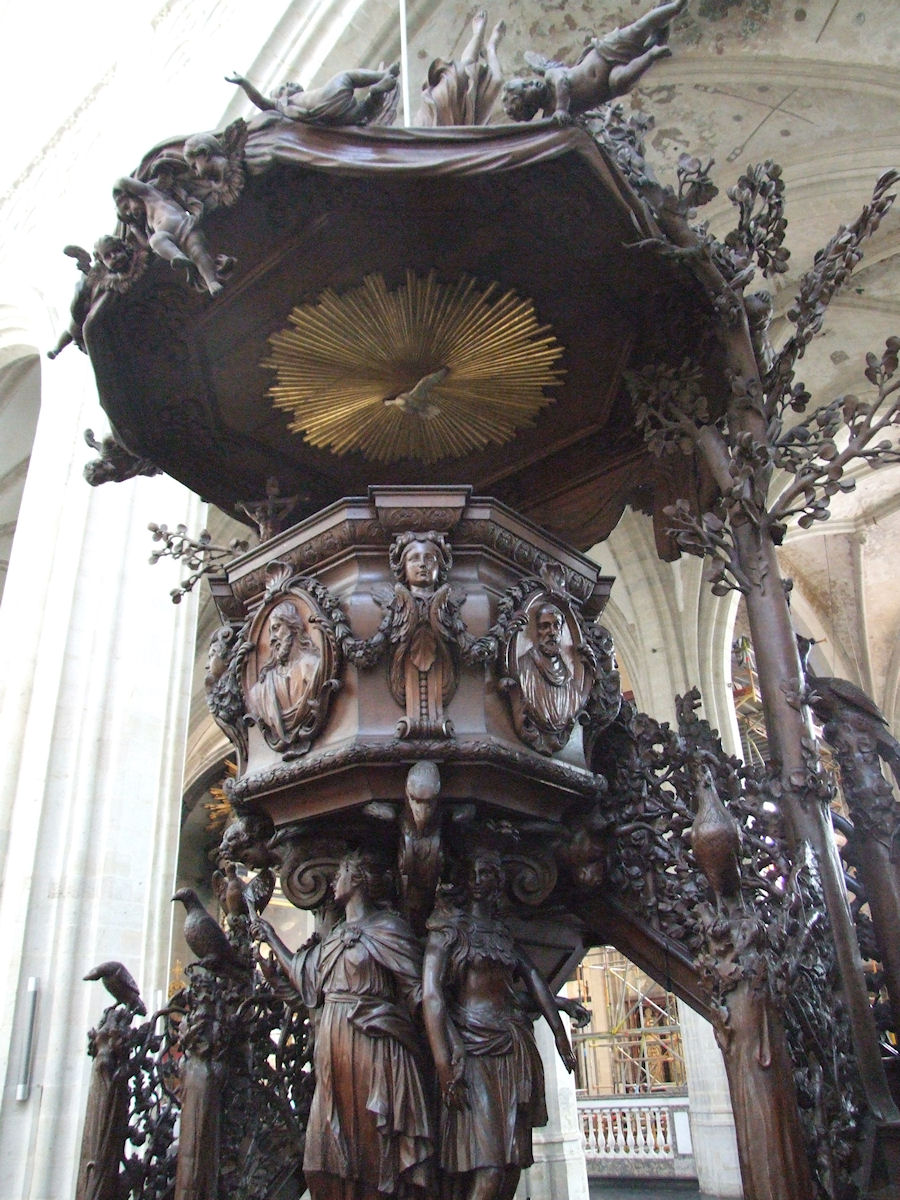
Pulpit in the Antwerp Cathedral

Van der Voort is well known for his funerary monuments. The style of his memorial statues was classical and simple as they were inspired by the classical sculpture he studied in Rome. Additional influences were Michelangelo and Rubens. In 1701 he created the epitaph for Michiel Peeters in the St. James Church in Antwerp. In the monument a personification of Eternity rises up like a body resurrected from the grave. The monument is carved in white marble against a black marble ground which is made to look like funerary cloth. The central figure is a personification of Eternity who is resting her right hand on a closed circle representing Eternity while her left arm is resting on a globe. The globe is a symbol of the sorrows and brevity of life on earth, which Eternity is leaving behind for the eternal joys of heaven. The style evokes the early 17th century classicizing sculptures of the Flemish sculptor François Duquesnoy in its clear outlines, Classical beauty type and smooth modeling.

He created in 1702 in the St. Rumbold's Cathedral in Mechelen two funeral monuments for the brothers de Precipiano. The memorial to Humbertus Guilielmus de Precipiano, Bishop of Mechelen is traditional in design, but the artist sculpted a lively portrait in full-length marble figure of the Bishop. The tomb of the Bishop's brother Count Prosper Ambrosius de Precipiano has as its base a vast stele combined with an allegorical figure holding a shield on which a portrait bust of de Precipiano is carved. The use of the stele was subsequently adopted by other Flemish sculptors. His interest in portrait sculpture is also visible in the Bust portrait of Jacobus Franciscus van Caverson (marble, 1713, Royal Museums of Fine Arts of Belgium), which is the sole surviving piece of a funeral monument that was originally in the former Dominican church in Brussels.

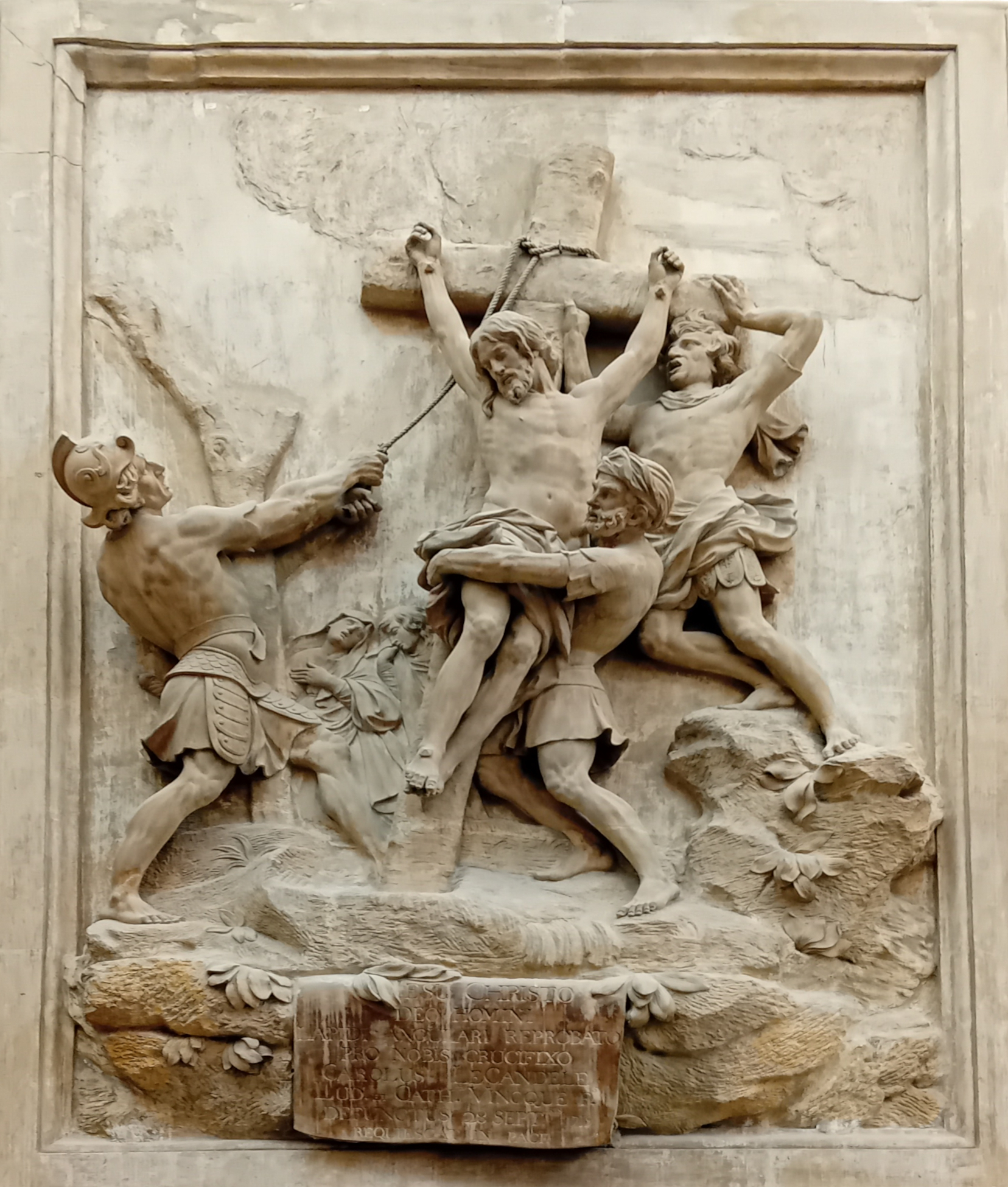
Raising of the Cross

In his pulpits van der Voort achieved the most exuberant expression of the late Baroque in Flemish sculpture. At the end of the 17th century a new design for pulpits had emerged in Flanders. Antwerp sculptor Hendrik Frans Verbruggen was the principal creator behind this new type of naturalist pulpit. In 1696–1699, Verbruggen created a pulpit for the Jesuit church in Leuven, which is now located in the Cathedral of St. Michael and St. Gudula in Brussels. He turned the pulpit into a complex theatrical stage in which at the bottom Adam and Eve are shown driven out of the Earthly Paradise, while the victorious Virgin on top of the pulpit's soundboard crushes the snake slithering from the tree of Good and Evil. In a similar vein van der Voort created a pulpit for the Church of the Abbey of St Bernard near Antwerp in 1713, which is now located in the Antwerp Cathedral. It is decorated with a myriad of plants and animals sculpted in a realistic manner. The supporting column of the pulpit consist of four figures who are representations of the Four Continents. His most exuberant pulpit is located in the St. Rumbold's Cathedral in Mechelen. He created it in 1721 for the abbey of Leliendael. He transformed the structure of a traditional pulpit into a stage for a 'tableau vivant'. The pulpit appears like a free-standing landscape in which a dramatic representation of the conversion of St Norbert takes central place. The saint is shown being thrown from his horse underneath a small mountain. The mountain is brimming with trees, animals and figures that emerge from the background of rough-hewn rocks. The Calvary and the temptation of Adam and Eve are also depicted in the pulpit. The crown of the tree of Good and Evil forms its sounding board. It is no longer possible to distinguish the architectural parts from each other which have become a single whole.

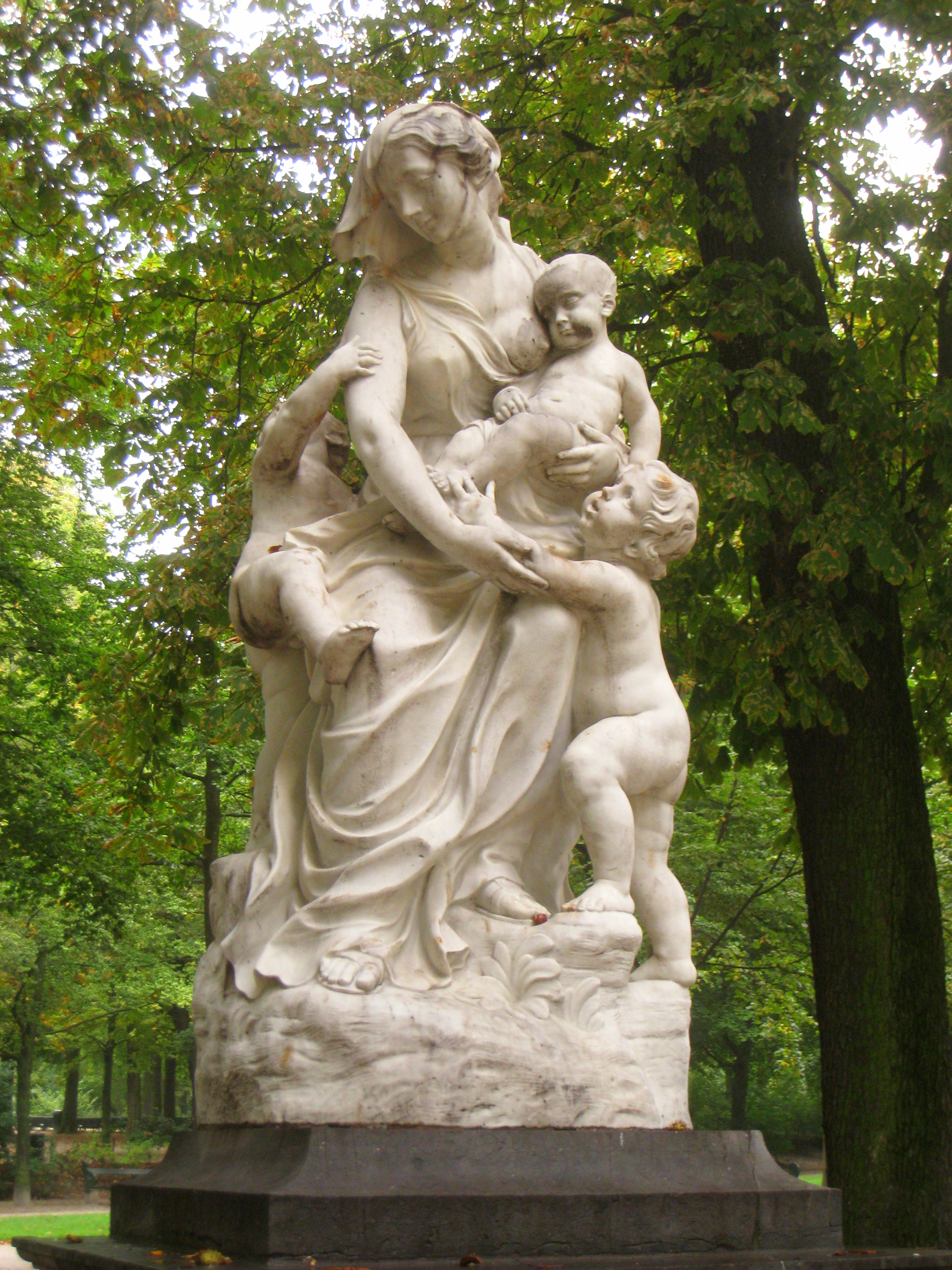
Charity

In 1720 he executed one of his finest reliefs, the Raising of the Cross, for the St. James Church in Antwerp. The design is taken from Rubens' treatment of the same subject in Antwerp Cathedral. Van der Voort achieves depth by letting figures overlap each other and lean out of the relief.

On the outside of the St. Paul's Church in Antwerp is a group of statues referred to as the Calvary. It was created on the location of an ancient Dominican cemetery by the brothers van Ketwigh who were Dominican friars. Its design dates from 1697. In 1734 construction of the Calvary was completed but further statues were added up to 1747. It is built as a courtyard and leans on one side against the south aisle of the church and the Chapel of the Holy Sacrament. The structure includes 63 life-size statues and nine reliefs executed in a popular and theatrical style. Most statues are of white stone with some made of wood. Some statues are dated or signed. The principal sculptors were Michiel Van der Voort the Elder, Alexander van Papenhoven and Jan Claudius de Cock with some statues by the hand of father and son Willem Kerricx, Jan Pieter van Baurscheit de Elder and anonymous collaborators. The statues are arranged into four groups: the angel path, which ascends to the Holy Sepulchre, the garden of the prophets on the left, the garden of the evangelists on the right and the Calvary itself, which consists of an elevated artificial rock, divided into three terraces, on which statues are placed with Christ on the cross at the top. The angels on the Calvary were directly inspired by the angels made by Bernini for the Bridge of Angels in Rome in 1657.

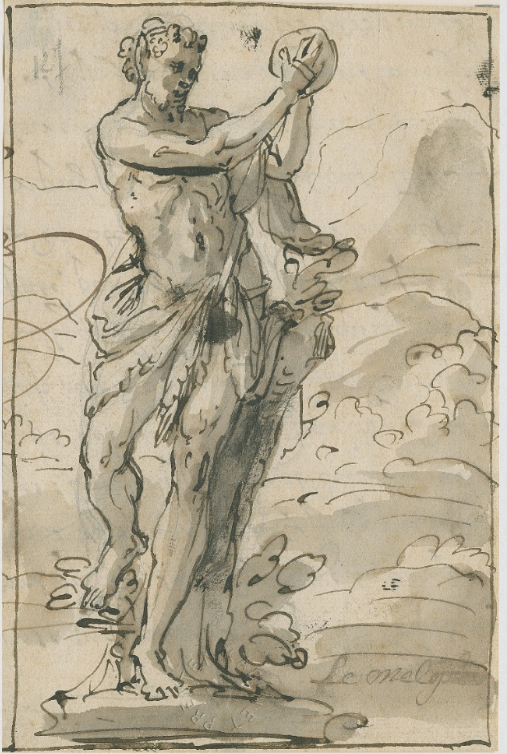
Faun making music

He also produced secular works, particularly of mythological subjects. An example is his Perseus and Andromeda (marble, 1746, Antwerp, Huis Osterrieth). In this work the virile Perseus stands beside the body of Andromeda in a carefully studied 'contrapposto'. Andromeda seems not to have suffered very much. Her body leans back like a bacchante by Rubens in an almost ecstatic posture. While the group lacks drama it breathes a certain pagan joy. In the century of the Counter Reformation, full of Christian symbolism, this work shows the force of Greek antiquity as an inspiration. A secular work with an allegorical subject is the Charity (marble, Brussels), which shows a female figure representing Charity surrounded by three children.

A number of drawings are ascribed to him. These include 12 preparatory sketches for the apostles in the nave of the St. Paul's Church in Antwerp (circa 1710) and a study for the portal of a Chapel of St. Eligius. He also made designs for the Antwerp silversmiths. He made a design for a monstrance, which was formerly attributed to the Antwerp silversmith Jan Baptiste Verberckt I. The design shows a kneeling angel to the left and a standing figure with an anchor that symbolizes Hope to the right. He made the design for the local silversmith Wierick Somers IV who made some changes to it in the executed work.
