= Laurys Gillis =

Flemish sculptor

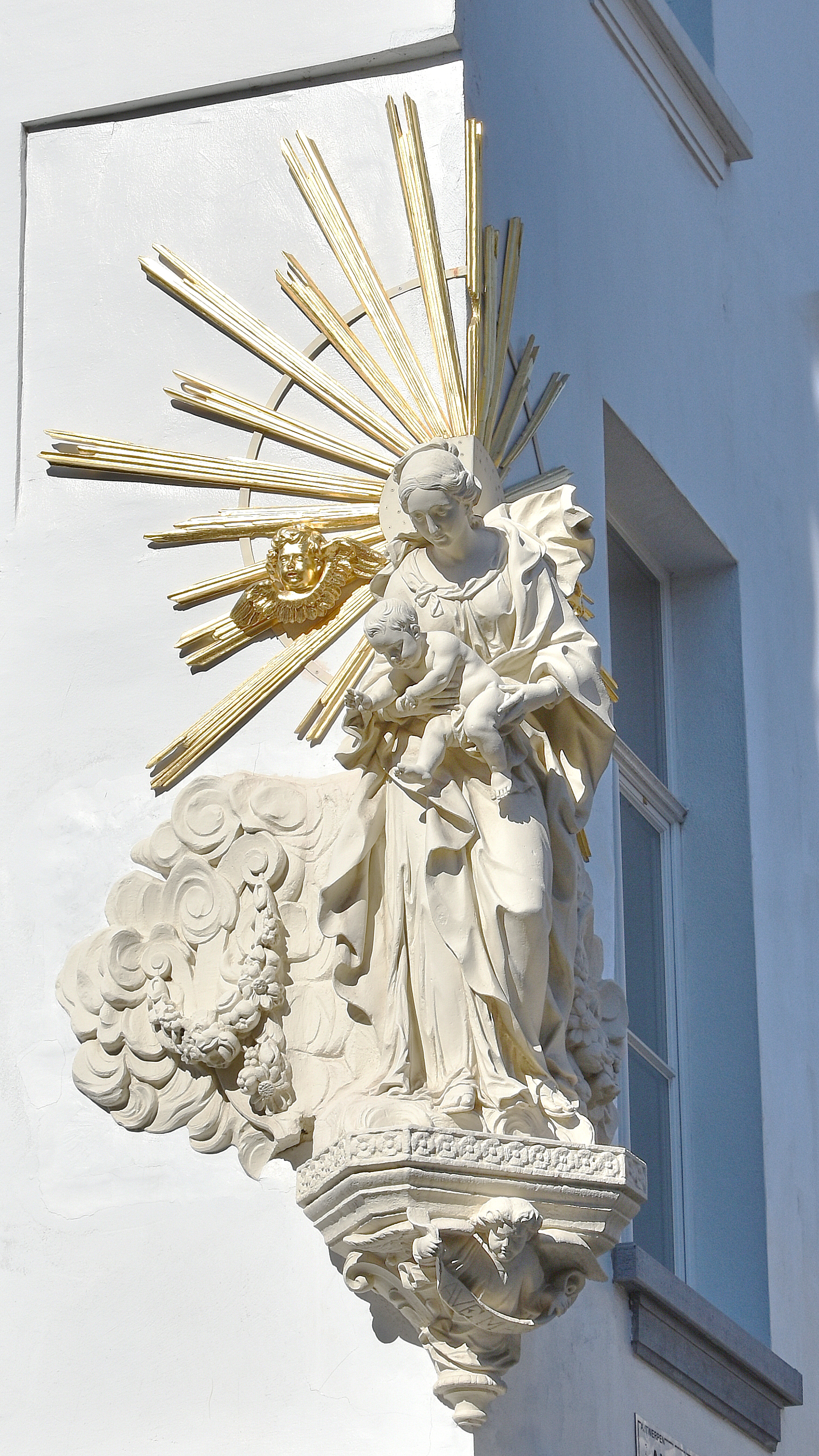
Virgin and Child, the Meir, Antwerp

Laurys Gillis or Laurent Gillis (1688 in Antwerp – 1749 in Antwerp) was a Flemish sculptor who was active in Antwerp in the first half of the 18th century. He worked for a long time in the workshop of the prominent Antwerp sculptor Michiel van der Voort the Elder. He is known for statues of historical and biblical figures, Christian saints and allegorical respresentations.

== Life ==
He was baptized on 25 August 1688 in Antwerp as the son of the cobbler Jan Gillis, originally from Hoegaarden, and Maria Margareta Gantier. In the Guild year 1701-1702 he was registered under the name Louwerijs Gieles at the Guild of Saint Luke of Antwerp as a pupil of the prominent sculptor Michiel van der Voort the Elder (Antwerp 1667 – Antwerp 1737). Van der Voort operated a large workshop in Antwerp which produced Baroque church furniture for the principal churches in Flanders and for export to the Dutch Republic.

He married Helena Mattheyssens (Matthijssens) on 3 May 1712 in Antwerp. Gillis remained to work in the workshop of his master for more than 20 years and only registered as an independent master sculptor (beltsnyder) in the Antwerp Guild in the guild year 1721–1722.

Two of his sons, Joseph (Josephus) (Antwerp 1724 – Antwerp 1773) and Jan Baptist (Antwerp 1717 – 1752) also became sculptors. A third, Herman (Antwerp 1733 – Antwerp 1791), became a painter and director of the academy in Leuven.

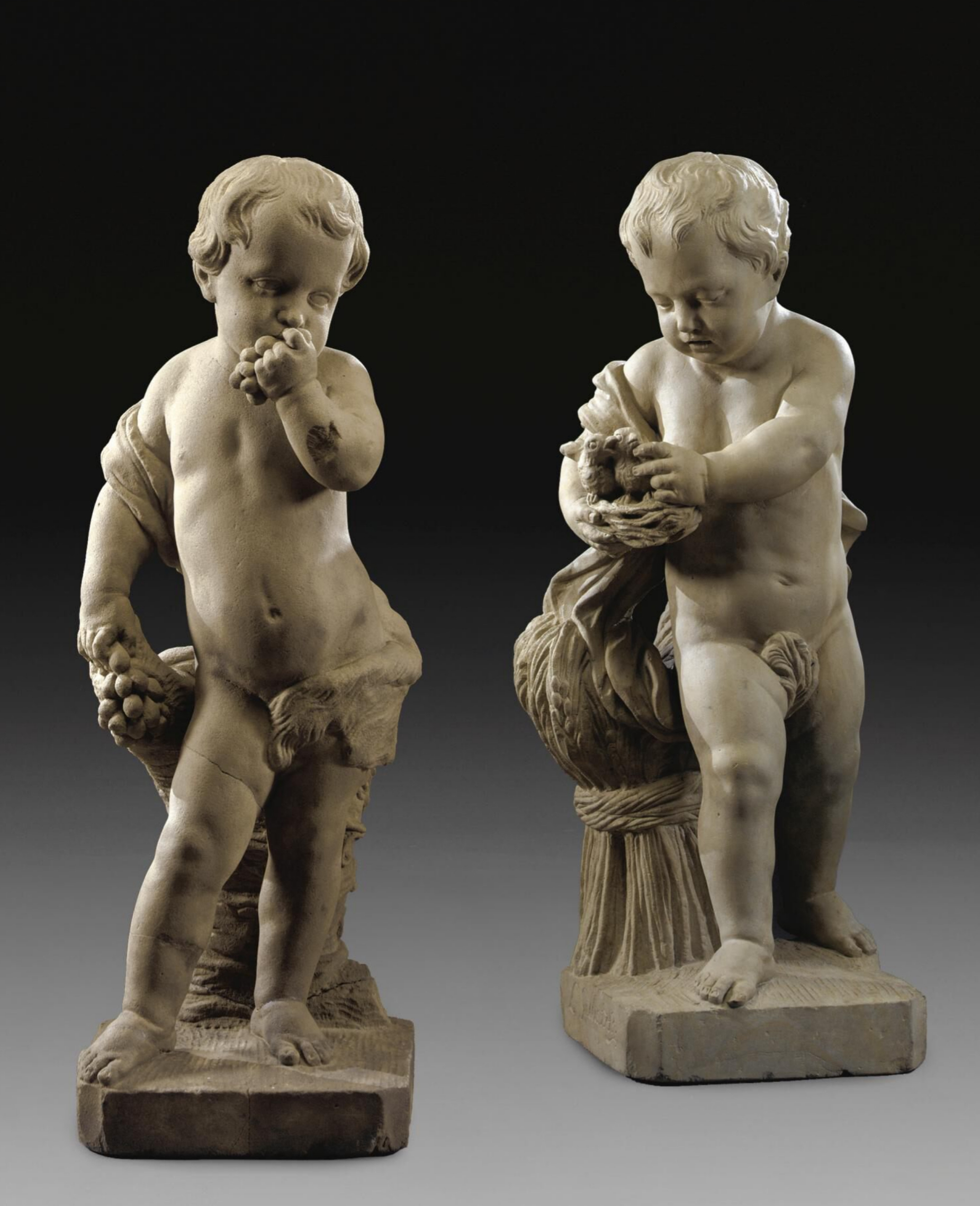
Two putti

On 13 October 1749 Gillis was reported ill and making a will together with his wife. In the will, they left the sculptor's tools, models and drawings to their son Jan Baptist, on the grounds that he had assisted his father for many years and had contributed most to the family income. He died later that year.

== Work ==
Only a few works are attributed to the artist as most of his work was produced during his stay in the workshop of his master van der Voort and is therefore not specifically attributable to a specific artist. His master's workshop exported many works to the Dutch Republic and it is therefore likely that many of Gillis' important works were also shipped there.

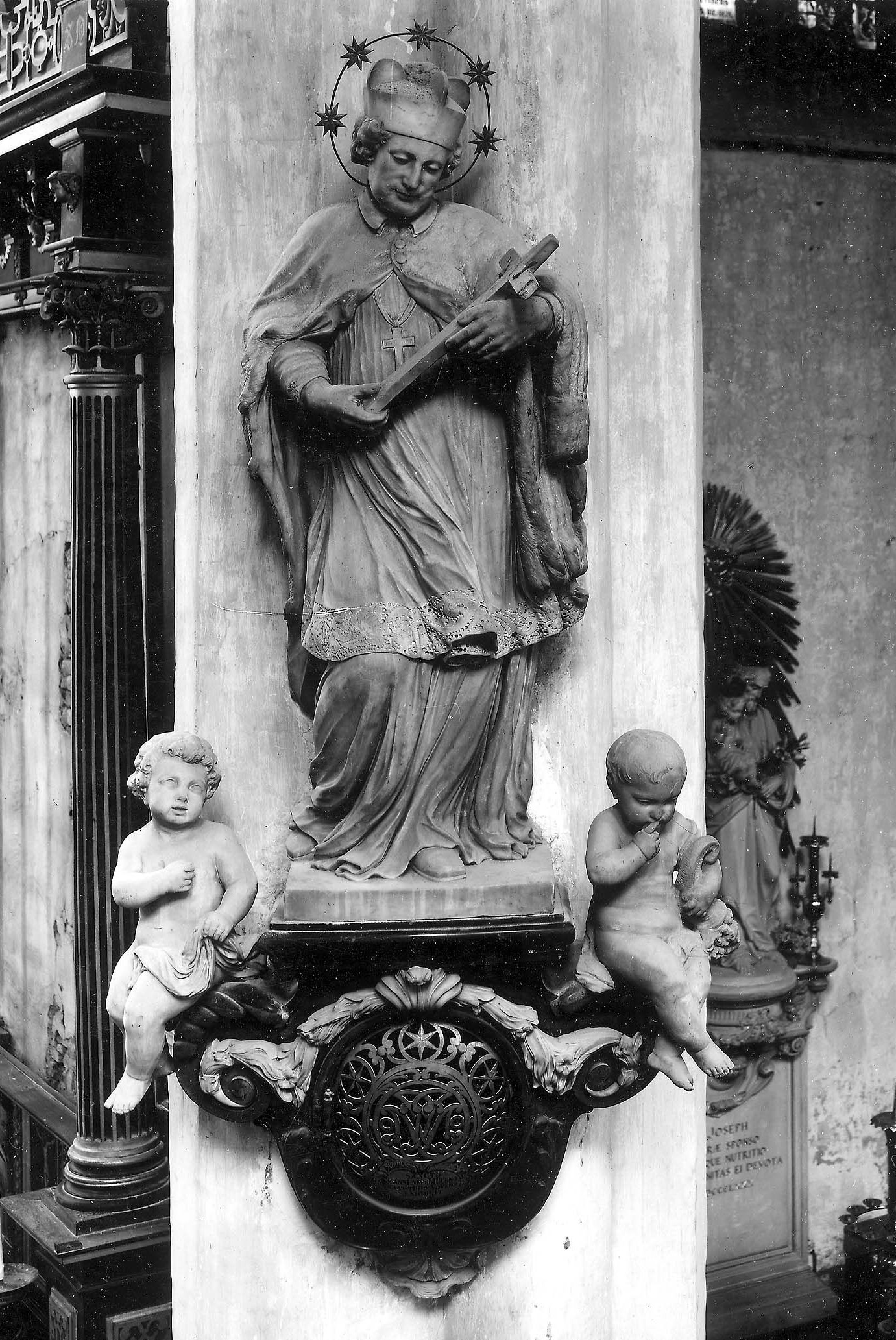
Statue of John of Nepomuk

A work attributed to him on the basis of documents from the 18th century is the statute of the Virgin and Child, which is attached to the facade of a building located on the corner of the Lange Klarenstraat and the Meir in Antwerp. This statue was previously attributed to Pieter Verbrugghen the Elder (Antwerp 1615 – Antwerp 1686). The late Baroque statue initially consisted of a group of three figures including a figure of Saint Aloysius. It was originally made for the boarding school of the Jesuits on the Sint-Jacobsmarkt in Antwerp but after the abolition of the Jesuit order in 1773, the statue fell into private possession, although it remained in situ. It was moved in 1814, without the statue of Saint Aloysius, first to the corner of the Meir and Twaalfmaandenstraat, and then in 1872 to its current location. This statue shows the remarkable skill of Gillis as he created a very elegant statue in terms of posture, facial expression and the folds of the robe of the Virgin. Behind he Virgin a cloud cover with garlands and a large gilded halo is attached to the corner of the building. While the Virgin now appears to show the Christ Child to the passersby, she originally showed him to a kneeling Saint Aloysius, the patron saint of young students. The statue was restored at the end of 2013. During the restoration an additional angel head was added to the gilded halo.

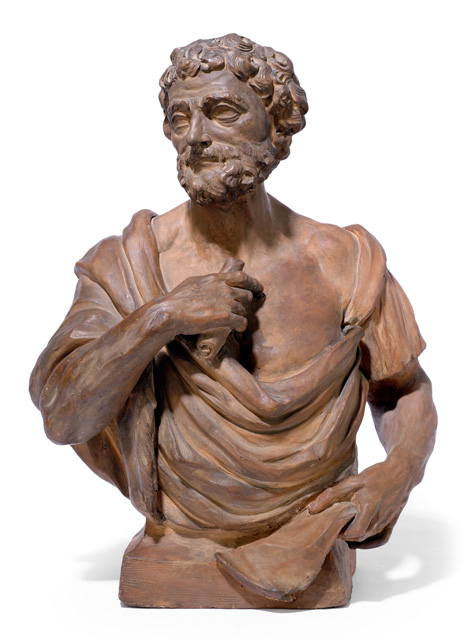
Bust of Marcus Aurelius

In 1740 he made a white marble statue for the Saint James' church in Antwerp. It represents John of Nepomuk with one angel holding a palm in his hand (now lost) and resting against a column, a symbol of steadfastness and another angel with his finger before his mouth, symbolising confessional secrecy. He made this statue five years after his teacher Michiel Van der Voort completed a similar statue for the St. Charles Borromeo Church of the Jesuits in Antwerp. The sculptures differ greatly in concept: whereas van der Voort shows the saint in a rather combative stance using the cross as a triumphal display, Gillis' saint is shown calmly contemplating Christ on the cross.

A Bust of Marcus Aurelius in terracotta, signed and dated 1739, is likely a study for a larger work.

Gillis also made small-scale works. Examples are the two small stone statues of putti, signed and dated 1743 (Sotheby's auction of 9 July 2008 lot 152). The figures appear to symbolise seasons: one has a basket of grapes behind him and is eating some grapes, which is likely an allegory of autumn, while the other has a wheat sheaf behind him and is holding a nest of birds, which is likely an allegory of summer.

== Bibliography ==
- J.M. Muller, 'St. Jacob's Antwerp Art and Counter Reformation in Rubens's Parish Church p. 405
- Verhandelingen van de Koninklijke Vlaamsche Academie voor Wetenschappen, Letteren en Schone Kunsten van België, Klasse der Schone Kunsten, Nummer 5, p. 431
- Piron, Académie Royale: Biographie nationale, pp. 255–257, 261
