= Miraculous Catch of Fish (Jacob Jordaens, St. James' Church, Antwerp) =

Painting by Jacob Jordaens

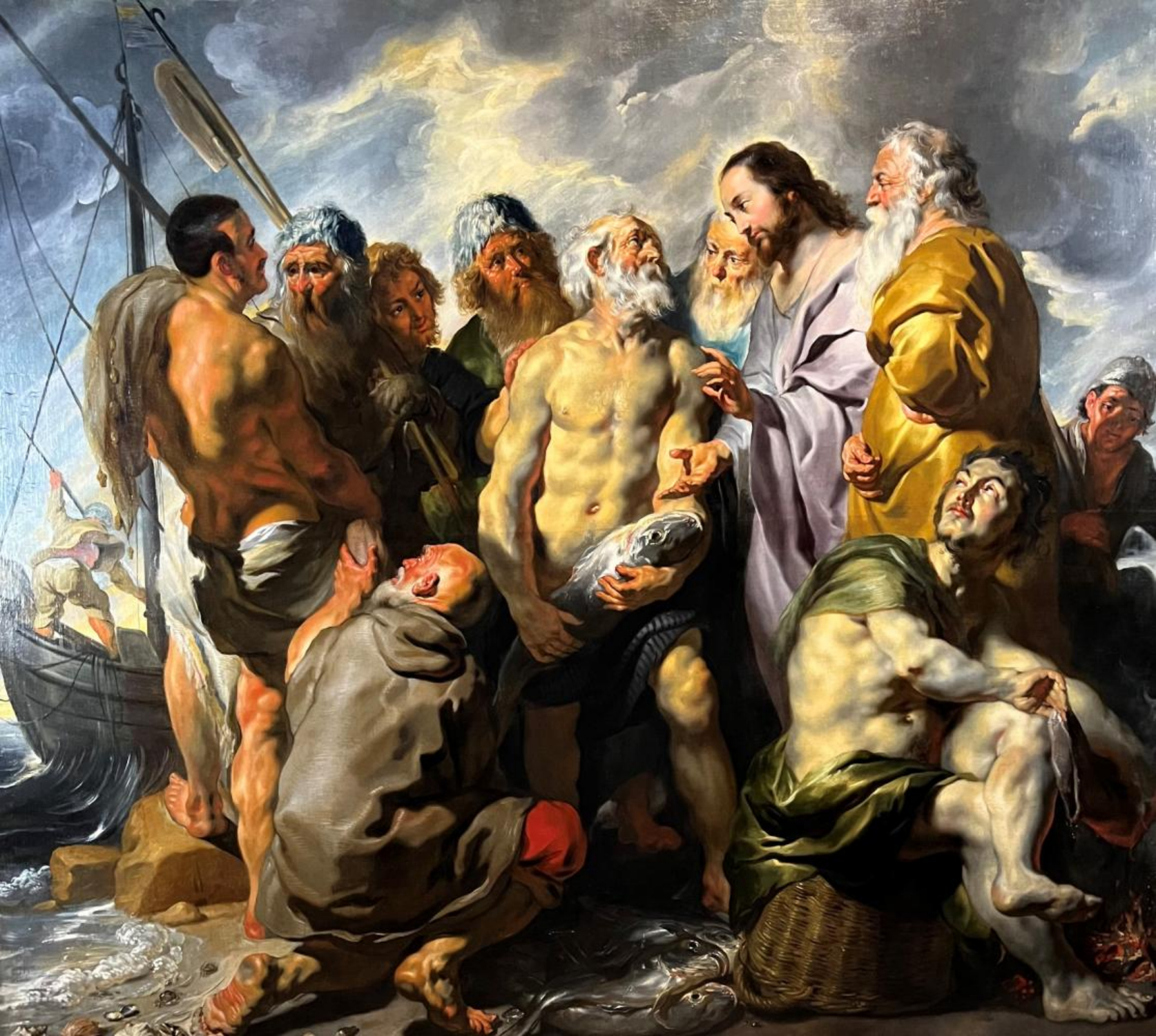
- Artist: Jacob Jordaens
- Year: 1616–1617
- Type: Oil on canvas
- Dimensions: 208 cm × 235 cm (82 in × 93 in)
- Location: St. James' Church, Antwerp

The Miraculous Catch of Fish is a painting by the Flemish artist Jacob Jordaens created some time around 1616 or 1617. It is in the collection of the St. James' Church in Antwerp. It is inspired by the story of the miraculous catch of fish as recounted in the Gospel of John (John 21:1–14) The composition was in the past called the Appointment of Peter as prime shepherd of the church or the Mission of Saint Peter.

== Biblical story ==
The composition is a dramatic staging of an episode in the story of Jesus' third appearance to his disciples after his resurrection as told in John 21:1-13. According to these Gospel verses, seven disciples of Jesus, comprising Peter, Thomas (called the Twin), Nathanael of Cana in Galilee, the sons of Zebedee (presumably John the Apostle and James the Great) and two unnamed disciples take their boat out one night to go fishing on the Sea of Tiberias (also called the Sea of Galilee). They fail to catch any fish all night. Just after daybreak, Jesus is standing on the shore of the Sea but the disciples do not recognize him. He calls out and asks whether they caught any fish. When they answer in the negative, he tells them to cast their net on the right side of the boat. After casting their net as advised they catch a great number of fish — 153 large ones. When John realizes that the person on the shore is Jesus, he tells this to Peter. Peter, who is fishing naked, puts on some clothes and jumps into the water to swim ashore, while the others bring in the catch. Upon reaching the shore, they notice a charcoal fire with fish on it and bread. Jesus asks them to bring some of their catch. Peter then returns to the boat and pulls the net ashore. The net does not break despite the large and heavy catch. Jesus then invites them to have breakfast. The disciples do not dare to ask him who he is as they know it is Jesus. Jesus comes, takes the bread and gives it to them, and does the same with the fish.

== Description of the painting ==
Jordaens has depicted the scene when the seven disciples have landed ashore and Jesus is gesturing them to join him in breakfast. A half-naked, very athletic looking Peter is depicted in the center facing the viewer and holding a large fish with both hands. Jesus, seen from the side, stands immediately to the left of Peter who is looking up into Jesus' face.

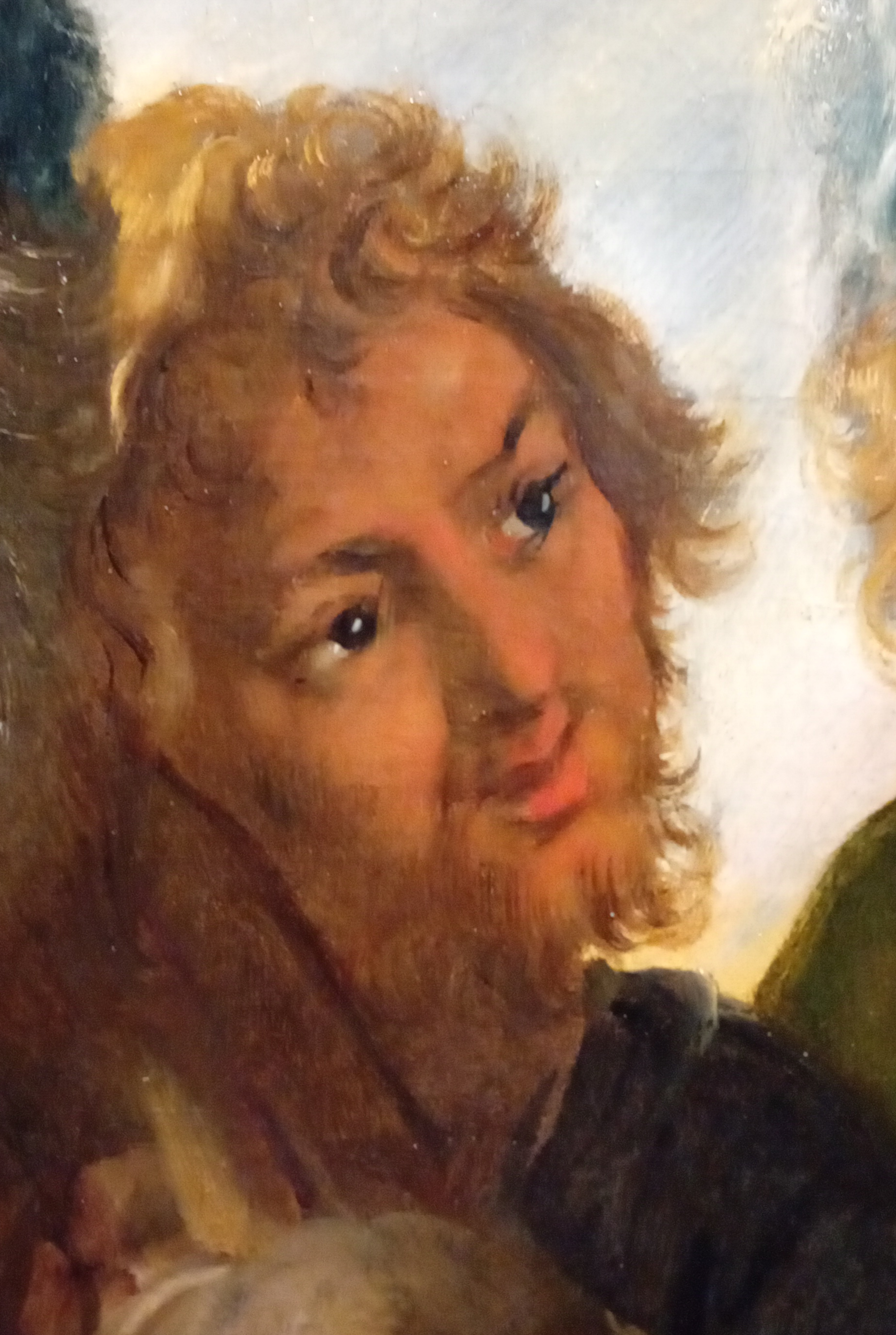
John lovingly looking at Jesus

The other six disciples stand in a half circle around Peter and Jesus. The disciples cannot be identified with certainty. Possibly John the Apostle is the youthful apostle touching Peter with his hand and looking at Jesus over the shoulders of the grey-haired and bearded apostles on the left. John's brother James may be the black-haired disciple on the left who is holding with his right hand a net draped over his left shoulder. The net references the mission given by Jesus to his disciples to become fishers of men (Matthew 4:18-22). On the bottom left we see the back of a squatting man with dirty feet who is looking up to the two disciples on the left while pulling at the part of the net held in James' right hand. This may symbolize the man's eagerness to become one of the men caught by the fishers of men. The grey-haired man next to James may be Saint Jude as he holds an oar and boat hook which are often his attributes in artworks. The disciples seem to have looks of wonderment and expectation on their faces. At the feet of Peter is a small mound of large fish. In the background on the left a boat is visible with a sailor busy on it.

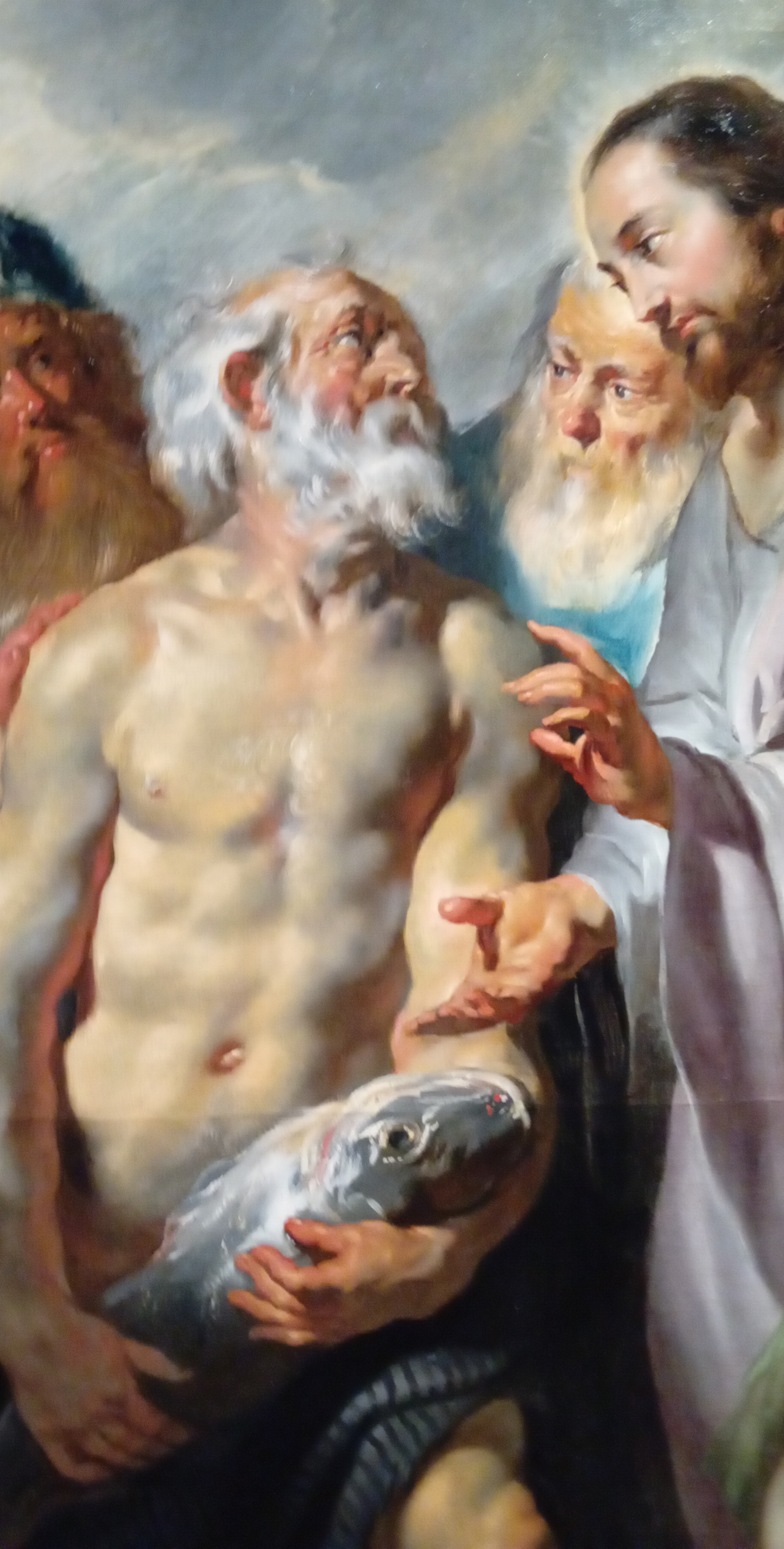
St Peter and Jesus

On the bottom right a man is sitting on an upturned basket. Next to him is a charcoal fire which he is stoking with a bellows held in his hands. The sitting man is as pale as a corpse. He is looking up backwards towards the group of disciples and Jesus. By placing the resurrected Jesus immediately behind the dead-looking man and by using the imagery of the rekindling of a fire, Jordaens symbolizes Jesus' resurrection from the dead, an important theme of the painting together with the theme of celebrating communion by jointly eating and breaking bread (as during the Last Supper). On the far right is a fairly young man holding a pole who looks towards the charcoal fire with a smile on his face, possibly in anticipation of the upcoming shared breakfast. The sky in the background looks dramatic with the sun starting to break through heavy clouds, possibly symbolising the bright future that awaits the followers of Jesus.

== History of the painting ==
Little is known about the history of the painting. It was commissioned by tapestry trader Michiel Wauters as a mantel painting to be hung above the chimney of his residence. It was donated in 1844 to the St. James' Church in Antwerp by Adriaan van Camp from Antwerp.

In 2025 the painting underwent a thorough restoration. During and after the restoration it was exhibited at the Snijders&Rockox House in Antwerp before returning to its location in the St. James' Church.
