= St. James' Church, Antwerp =

Church in Antwerp, Belgium

Coordinates: 51°13′12.75″N 4°24′38″E

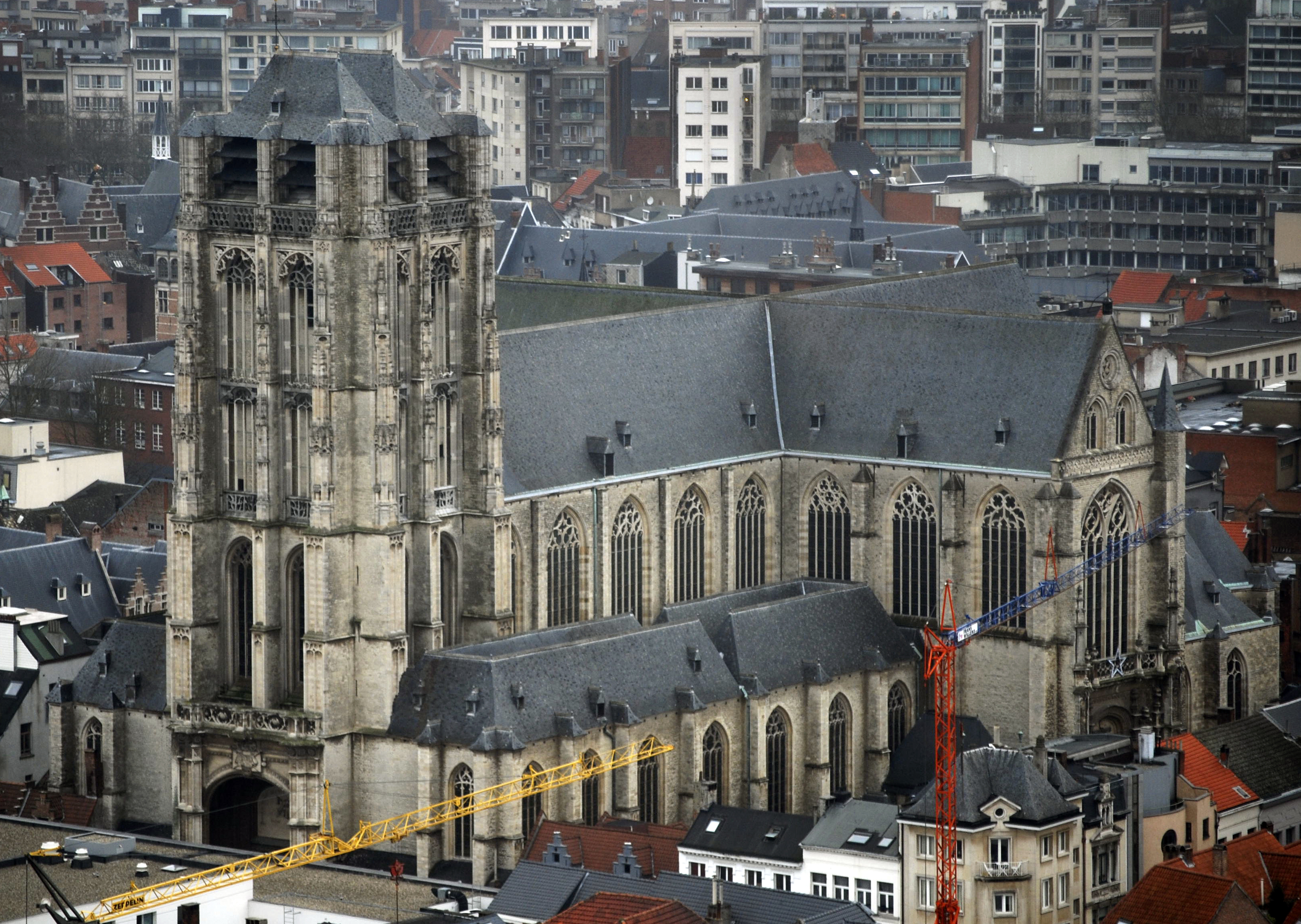
St. James' Church seen from the south-west

St. James' Church (Dutch: Sint-Jacobskerk) is a former collegiate church in Antwerp, Belgium. The church was built on the site of a hostel and chapel used by pilgrims to Santiago de Compostela and is still a pilgrimage church for those travelling to Santiago de Compostela. The building was designed by members of the Waghemakere family and Rombout Keldermans in the Brabantine Gothic style. The church has a very rich interior with furnishings and decorations mainly executed in the Baroque style. It holds paintings by Antwerp's leading painters from the 16th and 17th century such as Maerten de Vos, Peter Paul Rubens and Jacob Jordaens as well as abundant marble sculptures and church furniture crafted by Antwerp sculptors such as Artus Quellinus the Younger, Pieter Verbrugghen the Elder, Jan Pieter van Baurscheit de Elder, Jan Claudius de Cock and Michiel van der Voort the Elder. The church has 24 altars and contains the last resting place of many prominent Antwerp citizens, including Rubens and his wife Helena Fourment.

== History ==
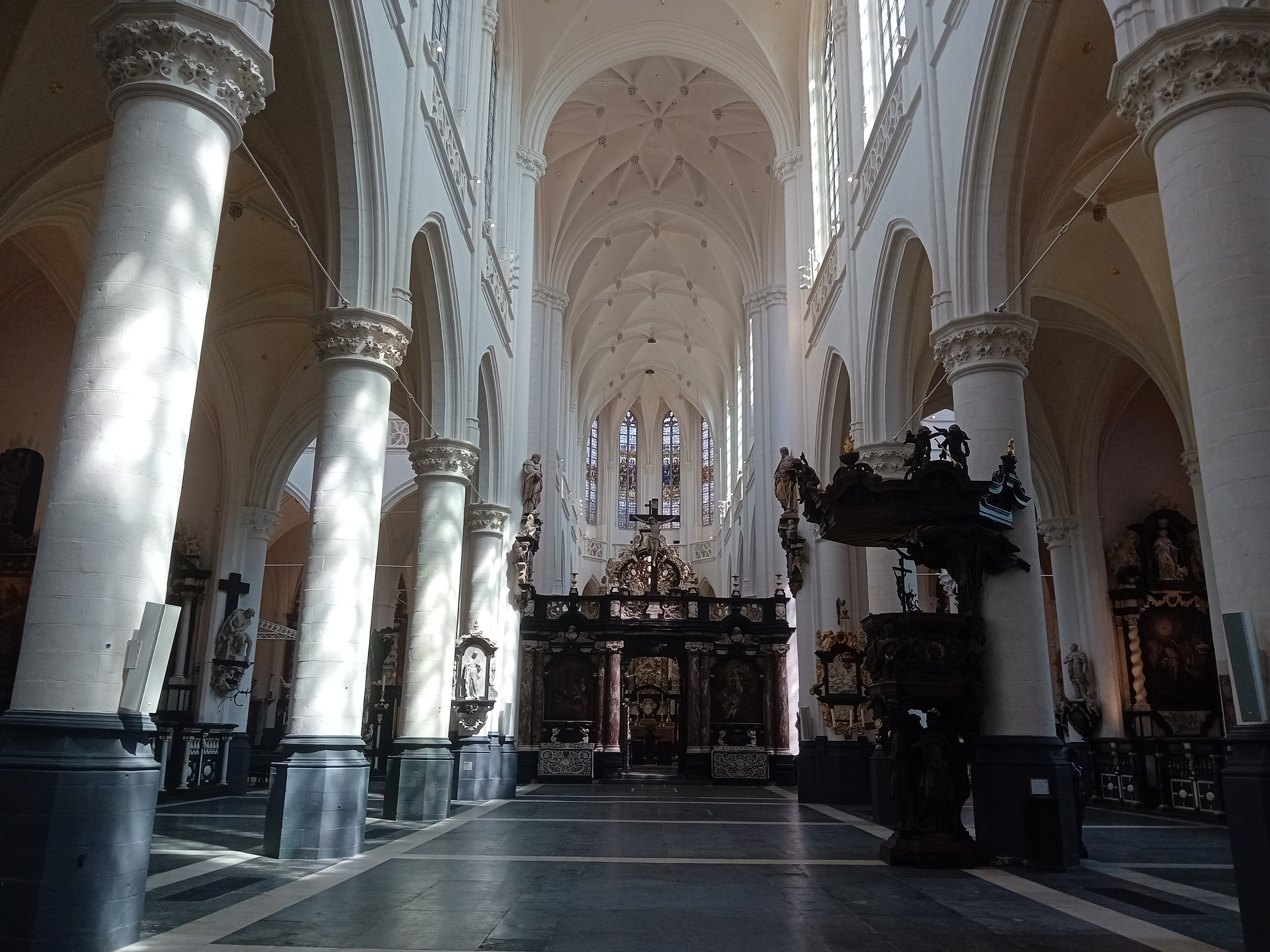
View of the nave towards the choir

St. James' Church has its origin in 14th century when a guesthouse was built outside Antwerp's city walls to accommodate pilgrims en route to Santiago de Compostela who had arrived after Antwerp's gates were closed. According to a medieval legend, Santiago de Compostela is the burial place of the Catholic saint Saint James the Great. In 1399, the brotherhood of St. James bought land outside the city walls on which the pilgrim's guesthouse and a chapel in honor of St. James were built in 1404-1413. As this district of the city became incorporated in the city walls and attracted wealthy merchants, bankers and noblemen, the St. James' Chapel was elevated to an independent parish church in 1478. Plans were made to replace the modest building with a large church. At the start of the church's construction Antwerp was on its way to becoming one of the most important economic hubs in Europe. This was reflected in a very ambitious plan to build an imposing church with a single tower of about 150 m (490 ft) tall, well above the 123 m (404 ft) of the two planned towers of Antwerp Cathedral. Due to the economic decline of Antwerp from the mid-16th century onwards, financial constraints eventually caused construction to be halted after the tower had reached just one third of its planned height.

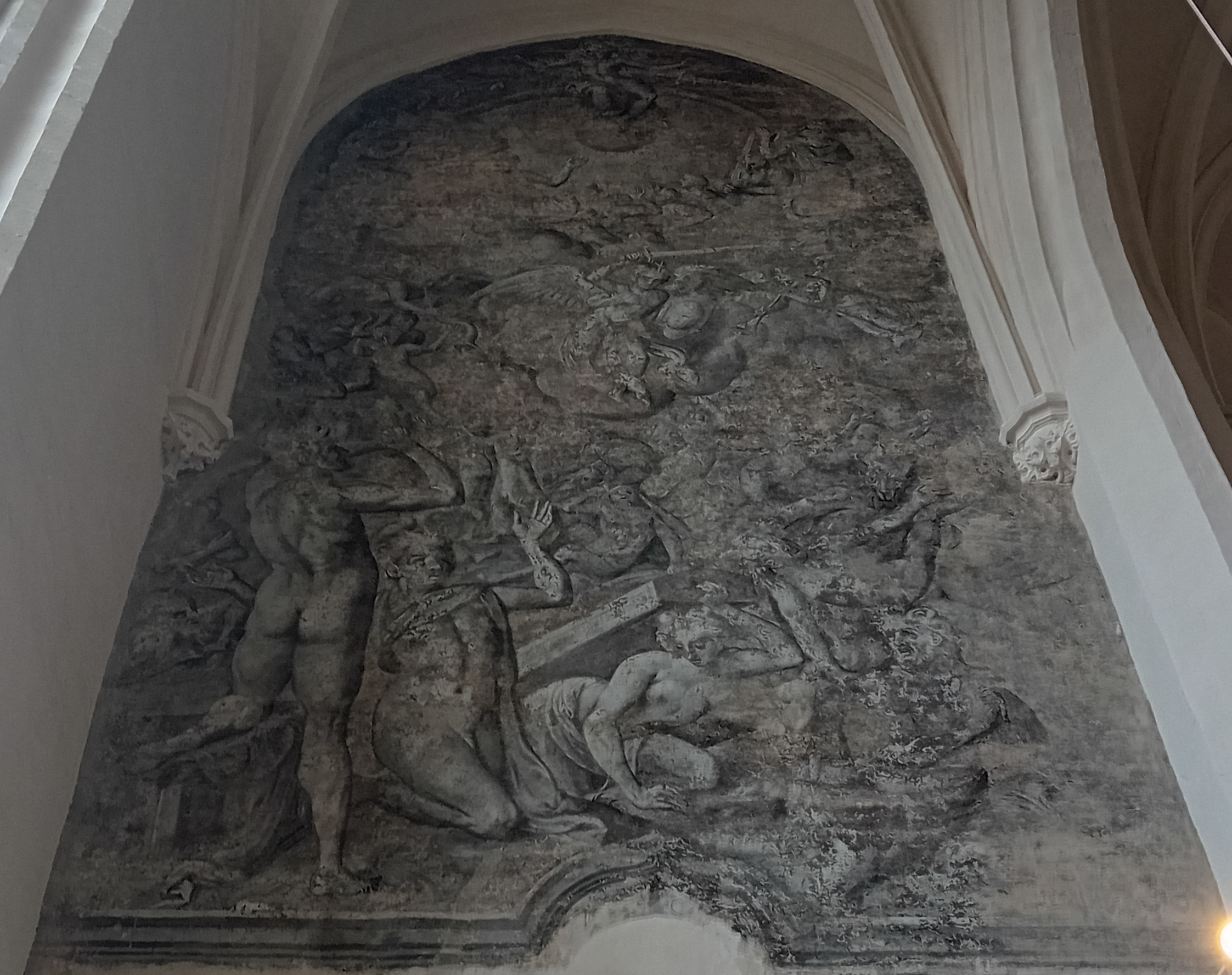
Last Judgement, mural in the St Roch Chapel

Construction of the church started in 1491 and was only completed in 1656 after three building phases. In the first phase from 1491 to 1533, construction on the tower and the large nave was commenced. The master builders Herman I, Domien and Herman II de Waghemakere and Rombout Keldermans were in charge of the design and supervision of the works. They ensured that the final church building has a consistent late Gothic exterior. In 1533 construction was halted due to financial problems. During the second construction phase between 1552 and 1566 the nave and transept were finished with financial assistance of Emperor Charles V. Construction ceased again due to financial and material constraints. In the third construction period from 1602 to 1656 the choir was completed, the side aisles and chapels of the nave were vaulted and the tower was raised further. The Venerable Chapel was enlarged between 1664 and 1665 and expanded to include the wedding chapel in 1669 and 1670.

The church was from 1579 to 1581 used by the Calvinists and restored to Catholic worship in 1585. Until 1801, the church enjoyed the status of a collegiate church where a daily office of worship was maintained by a college of canons, a non-monastic or "secular" community of clergy, organised as a self-governing corporate body.

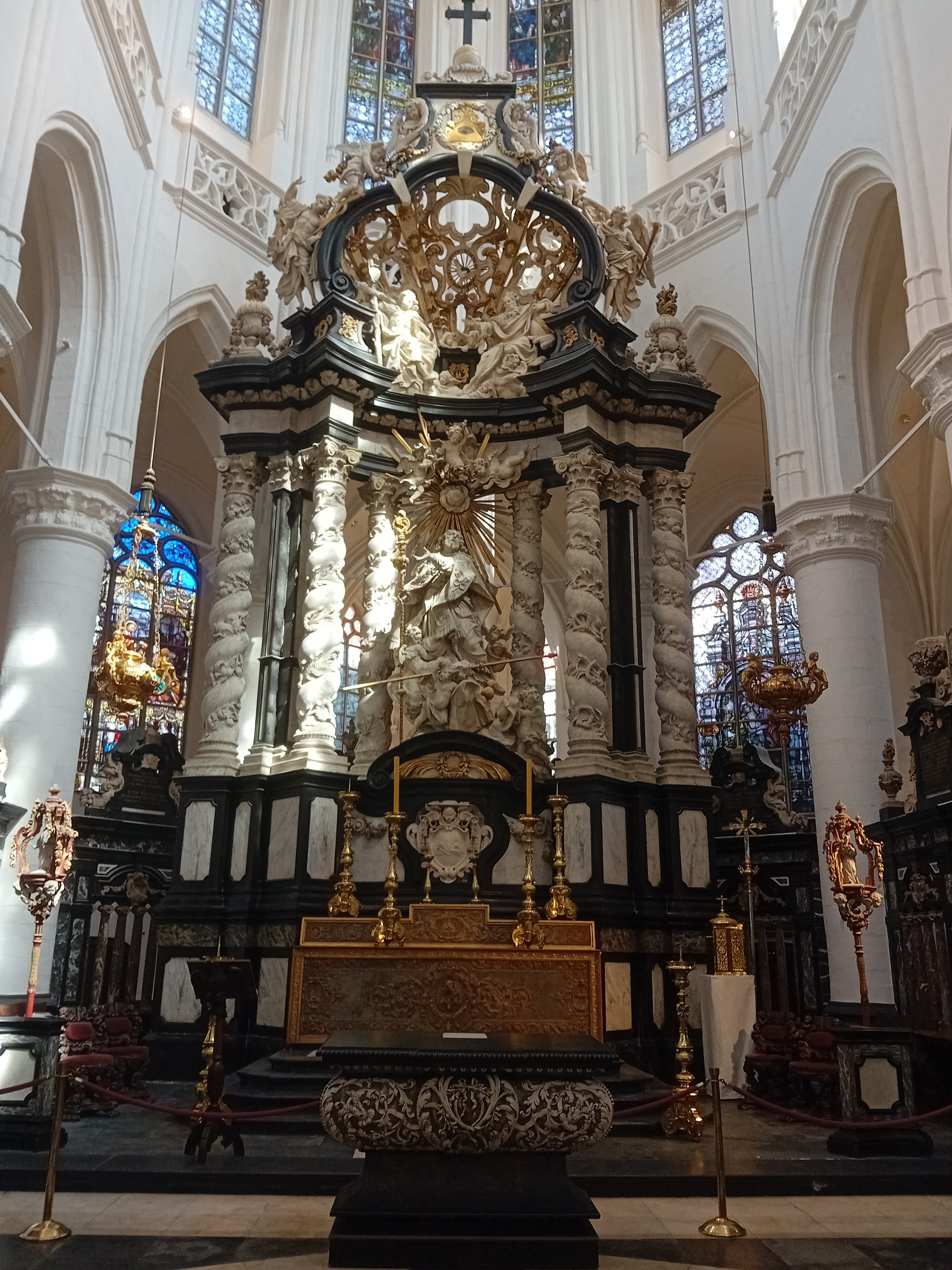
High altar by Willem Kerricx and Artus Quellinus II

== Style ==
The church is executed in the Brabantine Gothic style and its principal features are a sober exterior architecture, a heavy west tower, a gallery with skylights, a reduced triforium and powerful columns placed on octagonal pedestals. A row of chapels adjoining both aisles creates a unique three-dimensional effect. For reasons of stability and unity in style, the eastern part holding the choir and the ambulatory were executed in the Gothic style in the first half of the 17th century during the peak time of the Flemish Baroque. Even Baroque master Rubens' memorial chapel is in Gothic style.

The original Gothic and Renaissance interior furnishing, decorations and paintings were destroyed during the iconoclastic riots of 1566 and 1581. A single altarpiece depicing scenes from the life of Saint Roch, dated 1517, survived the destructive fury. The interior was decorated in Baroque style from the 17th century. Among the Baroque interior decorations are the carved wooden choir stalls, created between 1658 and 1670, the opulent main altar completed in 1685 by Willem Kerricx and Artus Quellinus II and the communion rails of the Venerable Chapel completed by Willem Kerricx en Hendrik Verbruggen in 1696. The central pulpit was finished in 1678 by Lodewijk Willemsens.

The Baroque 17th-century interior was saved when the French occupied Antwerp during the French Revolution thanks to a priest who pledged allegiance to the revolutionaries. They rewarded him by letting him choose one church in Antwerp which would be saved from plunder by the French. He chose St. James', thus saving its interior. Many of the original stained-glass windows were destroyed during World War II except for The Last Supper (1538) in the Chapel of the Holy Cross, the Habsburg Window (1626) in the Venerable Chapel and the Annunciation (1629) and the Visitation (1641) in the Chapel of Our Lady by Jan de Labaer.

=== Stations of the Cross ===
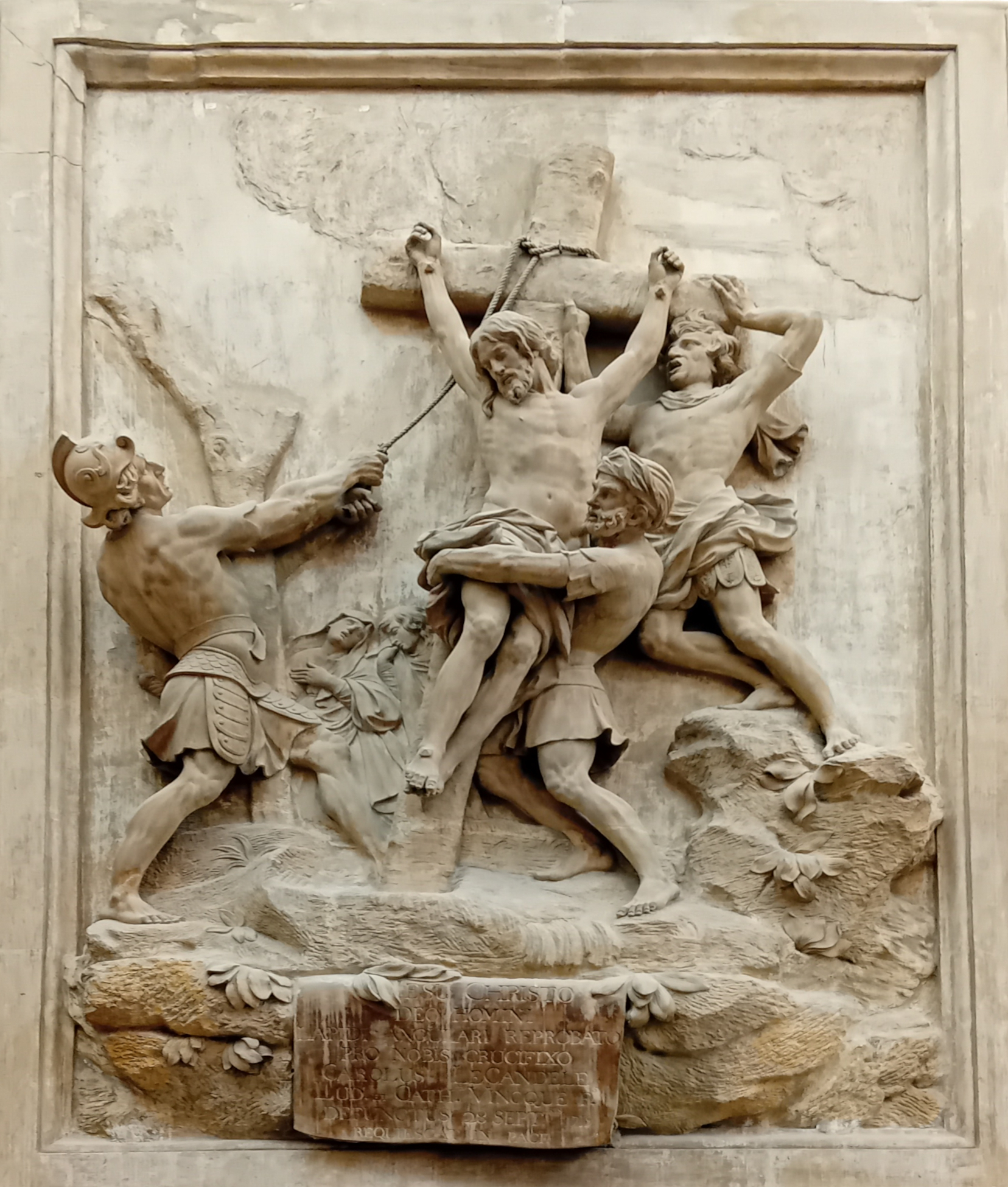
The Raising of the Cross by Michiel van der Voort the Elder

A series of sculptures representing the stations of the Cross was gifted by several noble houses and consecrated in 1855. Joseph Geefs executed the sculptures for stations 1, 2, 4, 8, 9, 12 and 13 while P. J. De Cuyper executed the others.

== Other notable events ==
- Rubens married on 6 December 1630 in Saint James his second wife Helena Fourment.
- Cardinal Danneels was consecrated in this church by Cardinal Leo Joseph Suenens in 1977.

== Organs ==
On top of the rood loft sculpted by Sebastiaan de Neve is the famous Jean-Baptiste Forceville (1727) and still has a functioning tracker action. Michiel van der Voort the Elder sculpted the angels playing music. The organ was played by many famous people, among them Henry Bredemers. The grand organ against the tower wall of the church was built in 1884 by Charles Anneesens in the Romantic style.

== Burials ==
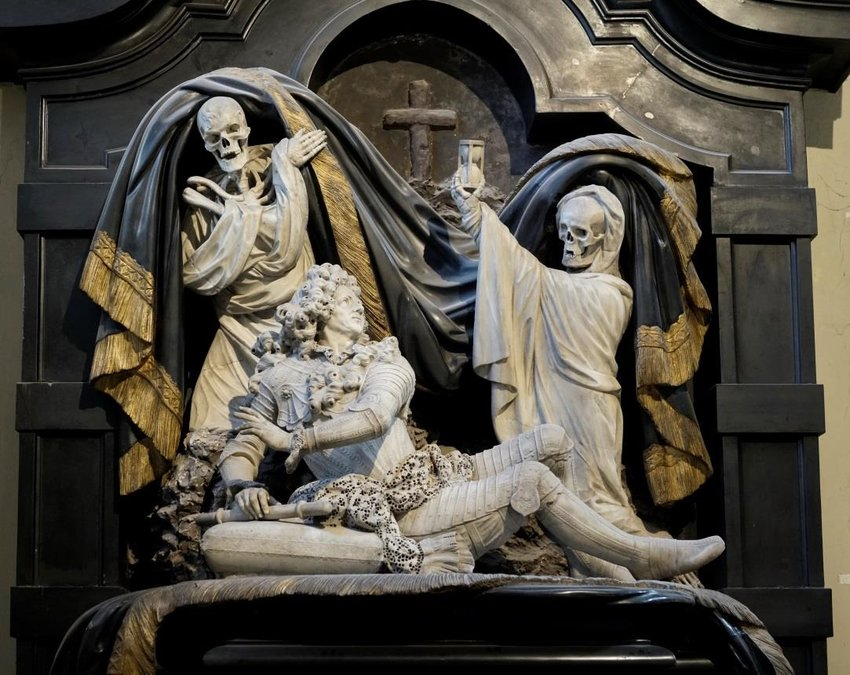
Gisant of Francisco Marcos de Velasco by Pieter Scheemaeckers

In the 16th, 17th and 18th century St. James' Church was the parish church of Antwerp's prominent citizens, several of whom built private burial chapels in the church. There are more than 1,300 graves in the church. Tomb monuments and epitaphs are found throughout the church. Some are very elaborate such as the funeral monument of Francisco Marcos de Velasco made by Pieter Scheemaeckers the epitaph for Ludovicus van Anthoine made by Willem Ignatius Kerricx and the tombs of Henrica Carolina Adriana Josepha van Cornelissen and Eugenia Catherina van Ertborn sculpted in marble by Guillaume Geefs. The most famous grave is that of Antwerp's renowned painter Peter Paul Rubens, completed five years after his death in 1640. The painting above Rubens' tomb is by the master himself.

=== Rubens family ===
- Peter Paul Rubens and Helena Fourment.
- Daniel Fourment, died 1643: marr. Clara Stappaert: father in law of Peter Paul Rubens.
- François I , son of Peter Paul Rubens: alderman of Antwerp in 1659, marr. Suzanne Charles.
- Alexander Josephus Rubens, Grandson of Peter Paul Rubens. Marr. Catherina Philippine de Parys, Philip Constant de Parys, Alexander Jacob de Parys, Joannes Bapt. de Parys, Isabella Alexandrine de Parys, Frans Frederic, Count of Respani.
- Albert Rubens, son of Peter Paul Rubens, marr. Clara del Monte.
- Clara IV Joanna, lady of Merksem, daughter of Peter Paul Rubens. Marr. Philip Constant de Parys, Catharina Franscica Rubens
- Nicolas Piqueri, died 1661: Almoner of Antwerp, marr. in 1627 to Elisabeth Fourment.
- Ghisbert van Colen, marr. Mary Fourment, niece of Helena.
- Emmanuel van Hoorebeeck, Son of Henry and Joanne Fourment.
- Ferdinand Helman, (1550–1617): father in law of Nicolaas Rubens, Lord of Rameyen. marr. Catharine vander Veken.

=== General ===
Artist

- Jan Boeckhorst, Painter.
- Godfried Maes, died 1679: marr. Anna Eeckelmans.
- Cornelis Schut, died 1655: Marr. Catharine Geensins, and Anna Schut, Peter Guillaume Schut.
- Hendrick van Balen, died 1632: Marr. Margreta Briers, and Son Jan van Balen.
- Jan van Balen, died 1654. Marr. Joanne van Weerden.
- Justus van Egmont, painter.
- Artus Quellinus the Younger

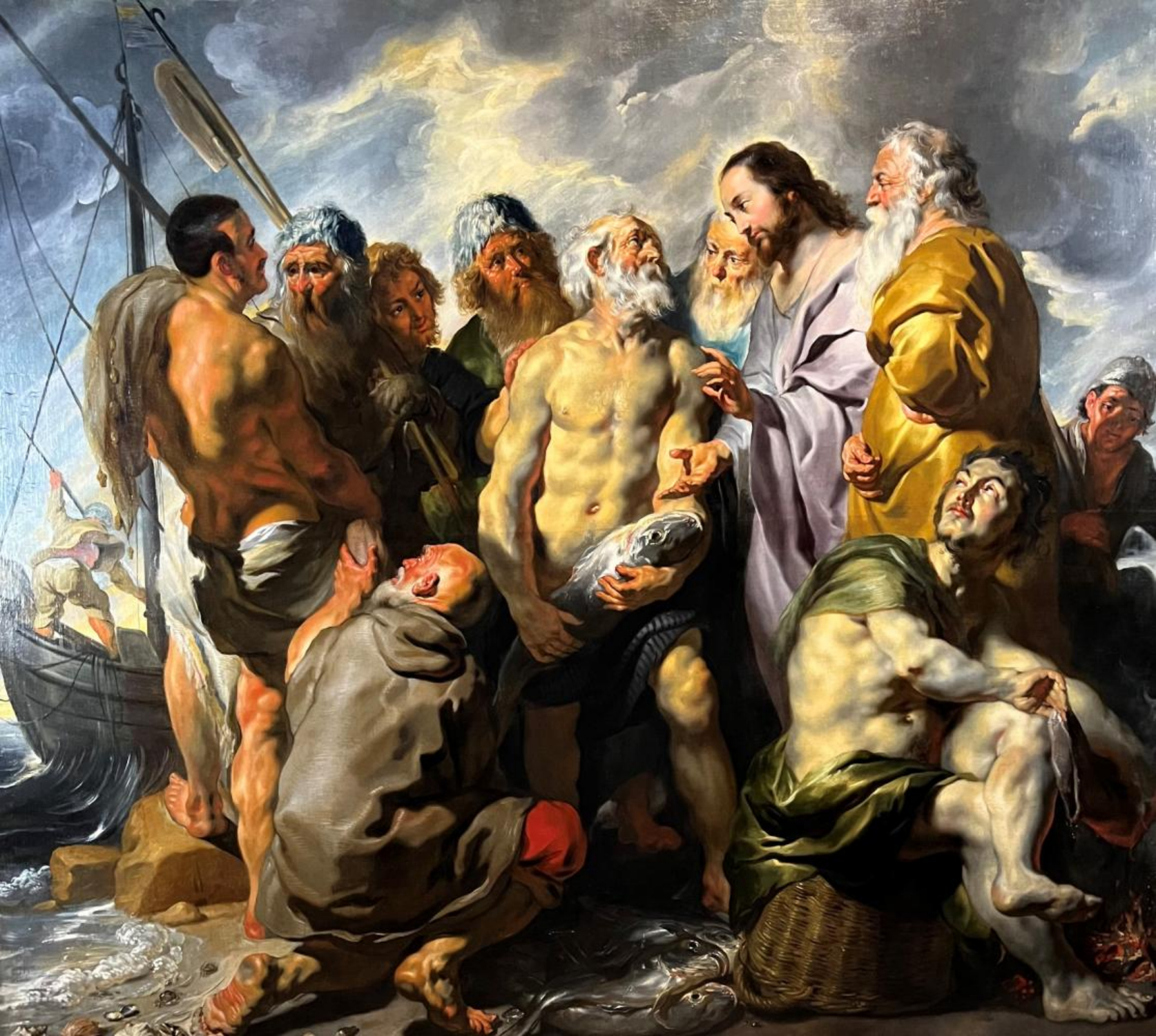
Miraculous Catch of Fish by Jacob Jordaens

- Hieronymus Wierix
- Arnoldus Hessius
- Mathias Joostens, 1767–1830: Composer, Marr. Catharine Stuyck.

Lord mayors of Antwerp

- Nicolaas I Rockox, uncle of Nicolaas II Rockox.
- Johannes Rockox, alderman of Antwerp.
- Jacob Dassa, son of Ferdinand and Barbara Rockox : knighted, Marr. Magdalena van Gammeren.
- John III Antony Tucher, knight: marr. Sussana de Cordes, died 1725. Both buried inside St-Anthonys chapel, Sculpted by Michiel van der Voort the Elder.
  - his daughter: Maria Antonia Tucher, marr. don Juan Franscisco de Santa Cruz, Lord of Boortmeerbeek.
- Ambrosius Tucher, knight marr. Mary of Ursel.
- Gaspard de Rovelasco, born 1540: marr. Elisabeth van Kestelt.
- the parents of Florent van Ertborn.
- Philippe Louis de Pret, father in law of Charles III Philippe van de Werve, 1st Count of Vorsselaer.
- Jan Roosen
- Jan van Weerden

Other

- Nicolaas III van de Werve, Lord of Giesenoudekercke: Married Magdalene of Halmale.
- Henry I van de Werve, married Lady van Cuyck.
- Isabelle Anne van de Werve, daughter of John IV van de Werve, 7th Lord of Hovorst, married John Baptiste della Faille, mayor of Antwerp.
- Joos Draeck, died 1528: son of Willem Draeck, Lord of Merksem, married Barbara Colibrant, gifted important window to the church.
- Adriaan Rockox, marr. Isabella van Olmen, parents of Sir Nicolaas II Rockox.
- Adriana Rockox, marr. Lancelot II of Ursel.
- Claire Rockox, marr Jan van de Werve, sister of Sir Nicolaas II Rockox.
- Antonio de Castro y Lopez, died 1663
- Jacon de Miranda, died 1602
- Pedro de Lapena, marr. Maria de Espinosa.
- Cornelis Lantschot, Benef. of the poor.
- Jacobo Hernandes de Miranda, marr. Amantia de Robelledo.
- Daniel Gerardus Melyn, marr. Anna Maria de Lannoy
- Melchior Gijsbert Hendrik van Susteren, died 1741: Marr. Constance Barbou.
- Fernando de Montesinos, marr. Serafina de Almeida y Castro.
- Johan Damant, marr. Anne de Witte.
- Paul Wuyts, esq. marr. Jacqueline de Landas.
- Louis du Boisch, marr. Mary Anne of Hoorenbeeck.
- Arnold Martin du Boisch, marr. Mary Catherine Vecquemans.
- George Mendes de Andrada.
- Manuel Tuvares Ulloa and Franscisco Alvarez Tavarez Lopez de Ulloa.
- Manuel Soarez Ribeiro.
- Henry Geelhand, (1694–1776): marr. Hélène de Claessens (1698–1766).
- Eugenia Catharine van Ertborn, sculpted by Guillaume Geefs.
- François de Paule-Joseph van Ertborn, died 1807: Grand Almoner of Antwerp, marr. Joanna Jozef Louisa van de Werve.
- Henrica Carolina Adriana Josepha de Havre, born de Cornelissen), baroness of Havre, sculpted by Guillaume Geefs.
- Giacomo Antonio Carenna, (1591–1672): Almoner of Antwerp, built the Borromeo Chapel in 1656.
- Joannes Bollaert, marr. Susanne de San Estevan.
- Francisco Lopez Franco.
- Joannes van Weerden, Church master: Marr. Maria van Severdonck, sculpted by Sebastiaan Van den Eynde (1669–1675).
- Christoffel Cominetto, marr. Maria Heyndrickx
- Joanne de Cuellar, mar. Clara Pels
- Bartholomaeus Balbi, (1542–1593): consul of genovese, and Giovanni Agostino Balbi.
- Manuel Nuñez de Evora, marr. Justa Nuñes.
- Jacobus Matth. de Moor.
- Joan Fernand. Sant Vittores de la Poitilla, marr. Maria de Steelandt.
- Fernando de Palma Carillo.
- Antonio Lopez de San Paio.
- Luis de Quesada, marr. Clara de Ayala.
- Johann Jakob Schenk von Stauffenberg, died 1588.
- Gaspar Rovelasco
