= Francisco Marcos de Velasco =

Spanish military governor and commander of Antwerp Citadel

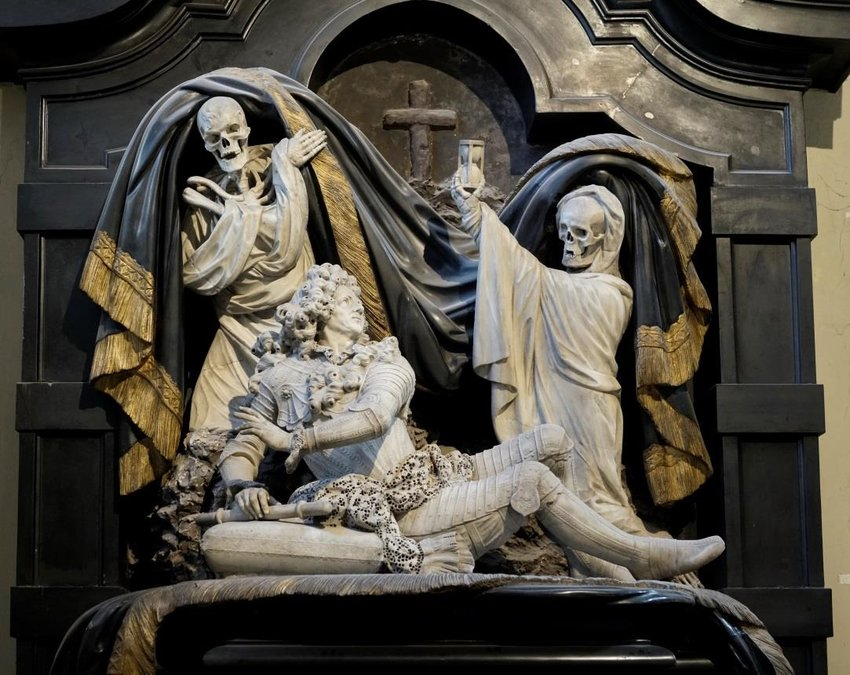
Tomb monument for the Marquess sculpted by Pieter Scheemaeckers

Don Francisco Marcos de Velasco y Alvear, Marquess of Pico de Velasco, (Carasa, Voto, Cantabria, 1633 – Antwerp, 17 June 1693) was a Spanish military governor and commander of Antwerp Citadel.

== Life ==
Velasco was born into a Spanish noble house descended from Pedro Fernández de Velasco (1399-1470), Royal Chamberlain and Count of Haro, and inherited the lordship of Pico de Velasco de Angustina. He became a knight of Saint James at a very young age in 1641 and went on to pursue a military career. In 1678 he was sent to Antwerp, where he became governor of the citadel between 1679 and 1693. In 1684 the king of Spain created him 1st Marques of Pico de Velasco de Angustina.

== Tomb ==
The Marquess is buried in Antwerp in the Church of St. Andrew's, the parish of the Citadel. The impressive marble monument sculpted for his tomb by Pieter Scheemaeckers was later transferred to the Saint James Church in Antwerp.
