= Jan Pieter van Baurscheit the Elder =

Jan Peter van Baurscheit the Elder
- Born: 8 December 1669; Wormersdorf
- Died: 10 May 1728 (aged 58); Antwerp

Jan Peter van Baurscheit the Elder (1669–1728) was a sculptor from the Southern Netherlands.

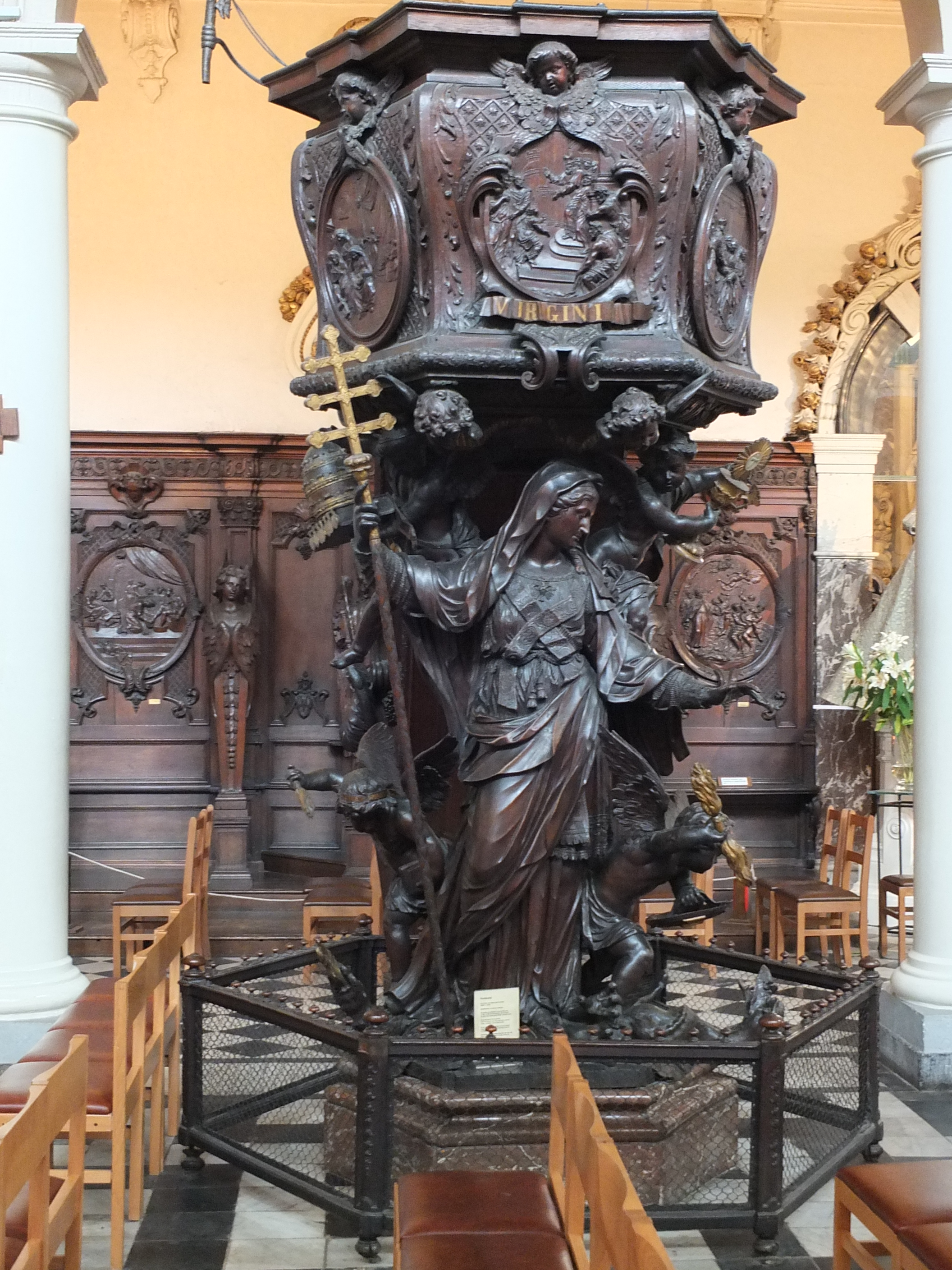
Pulpit of the Saint Carolus Borromeus church by Baurscheit the Elder

Elder was born in Wormersdorf as the son of the mayor there, and moved to Antwerp, where he first apprenticed to the nephew of Pieter Verbrugghen the Elder, Pieter Scheemaeckers, and then joined the Guild of St. Luke as master sculptor in 1694. The next year he married Catharina Boets and their son Jan Pieter van Baurscheit the Younger became an architect.

Baurscheit or Baurscheidt the Elder is known for religious works in various materials for churches around Antwerp.

Elder died there and was buried in the Sint-Walburgiskerk, Antwerp. Works by him and his son are preserved in the collection of the Royal Museums of Fine Arts of Belgium, Brussels.

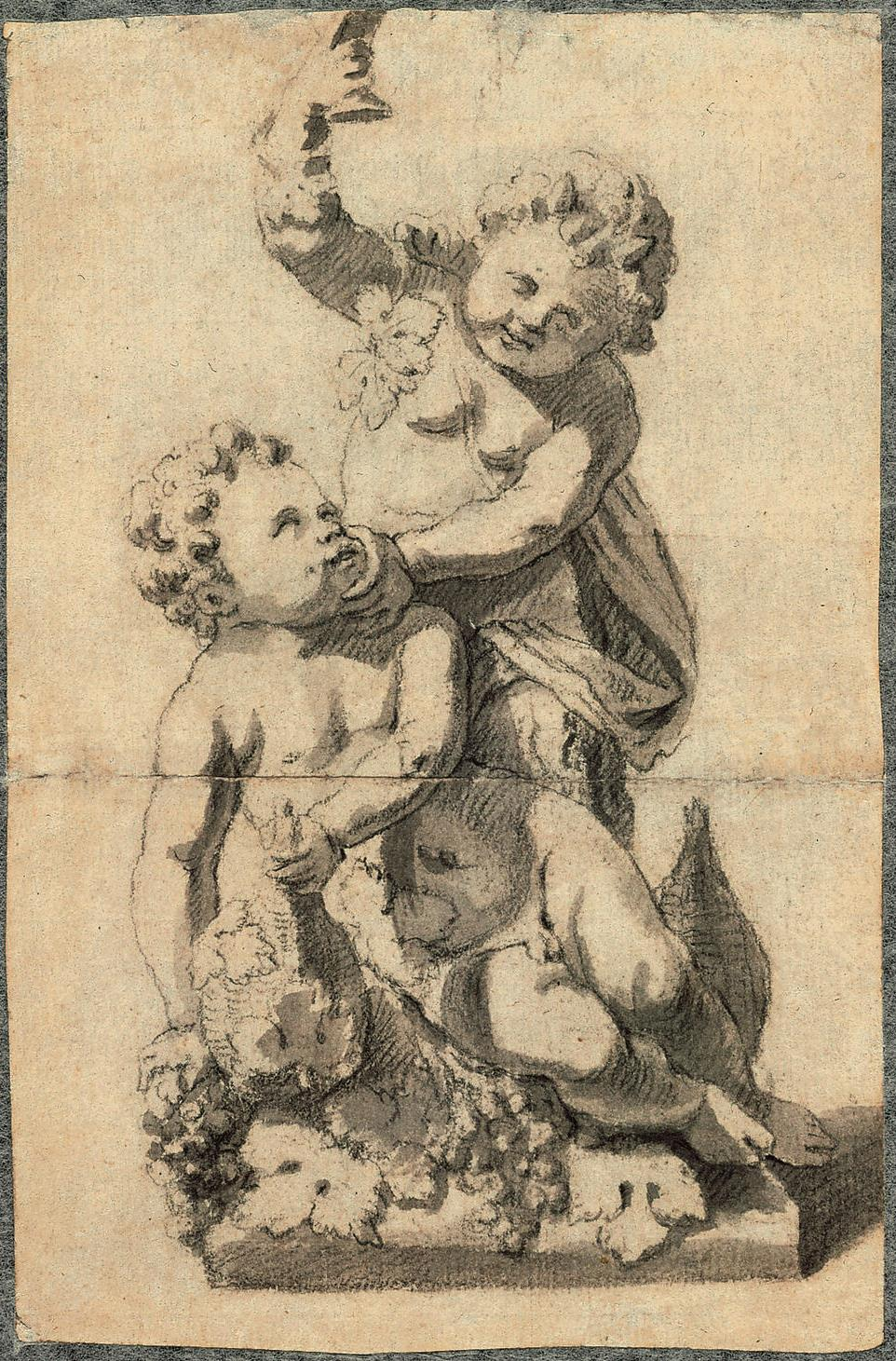

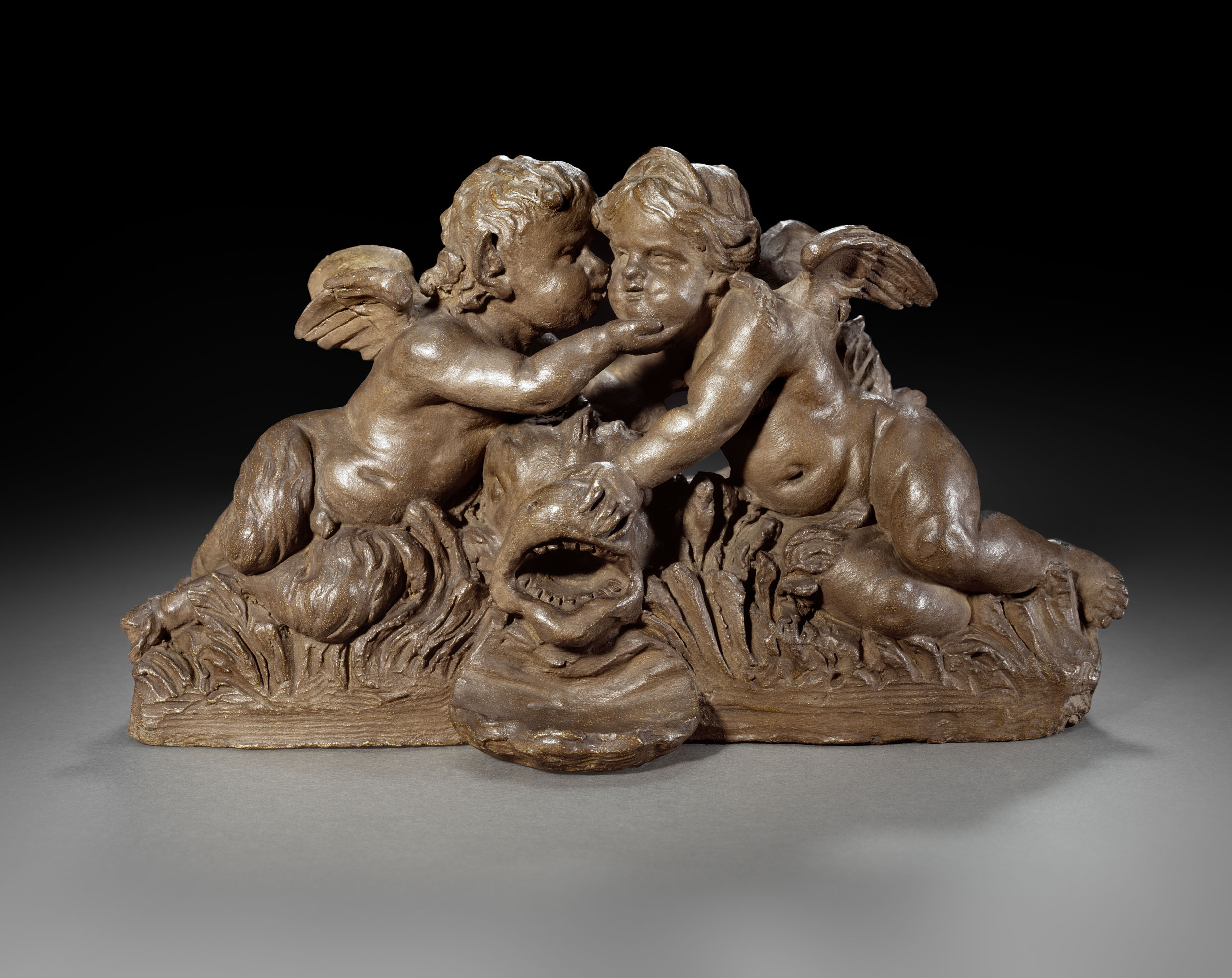

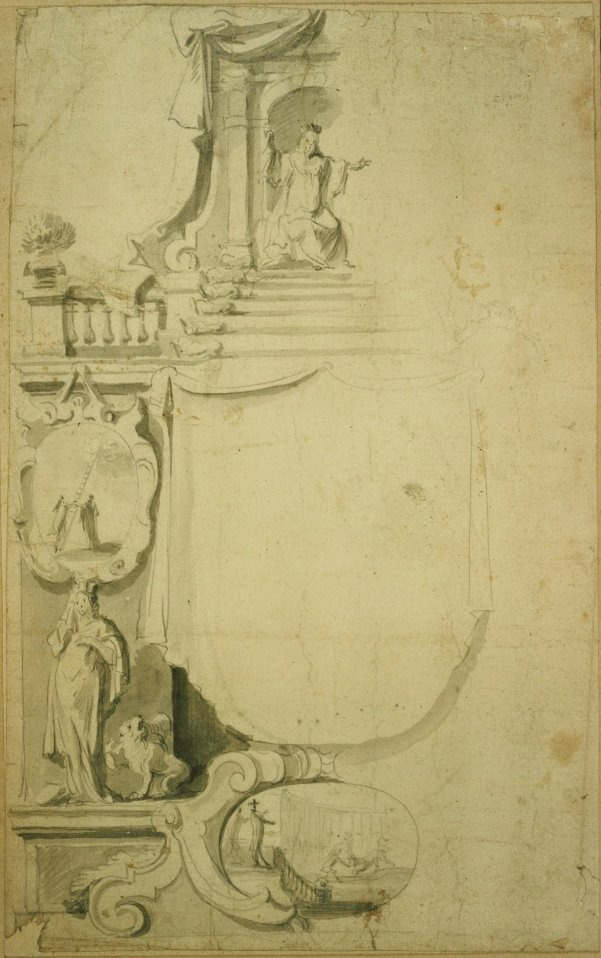

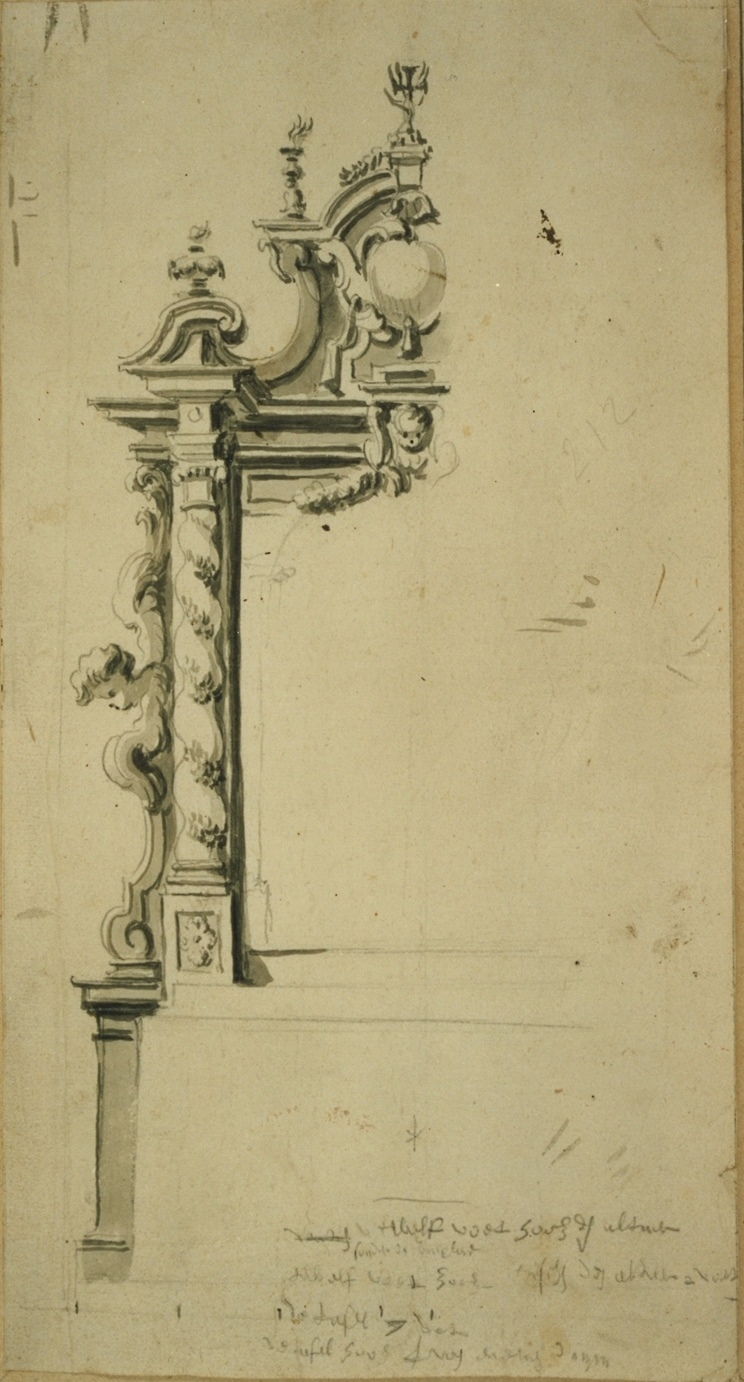

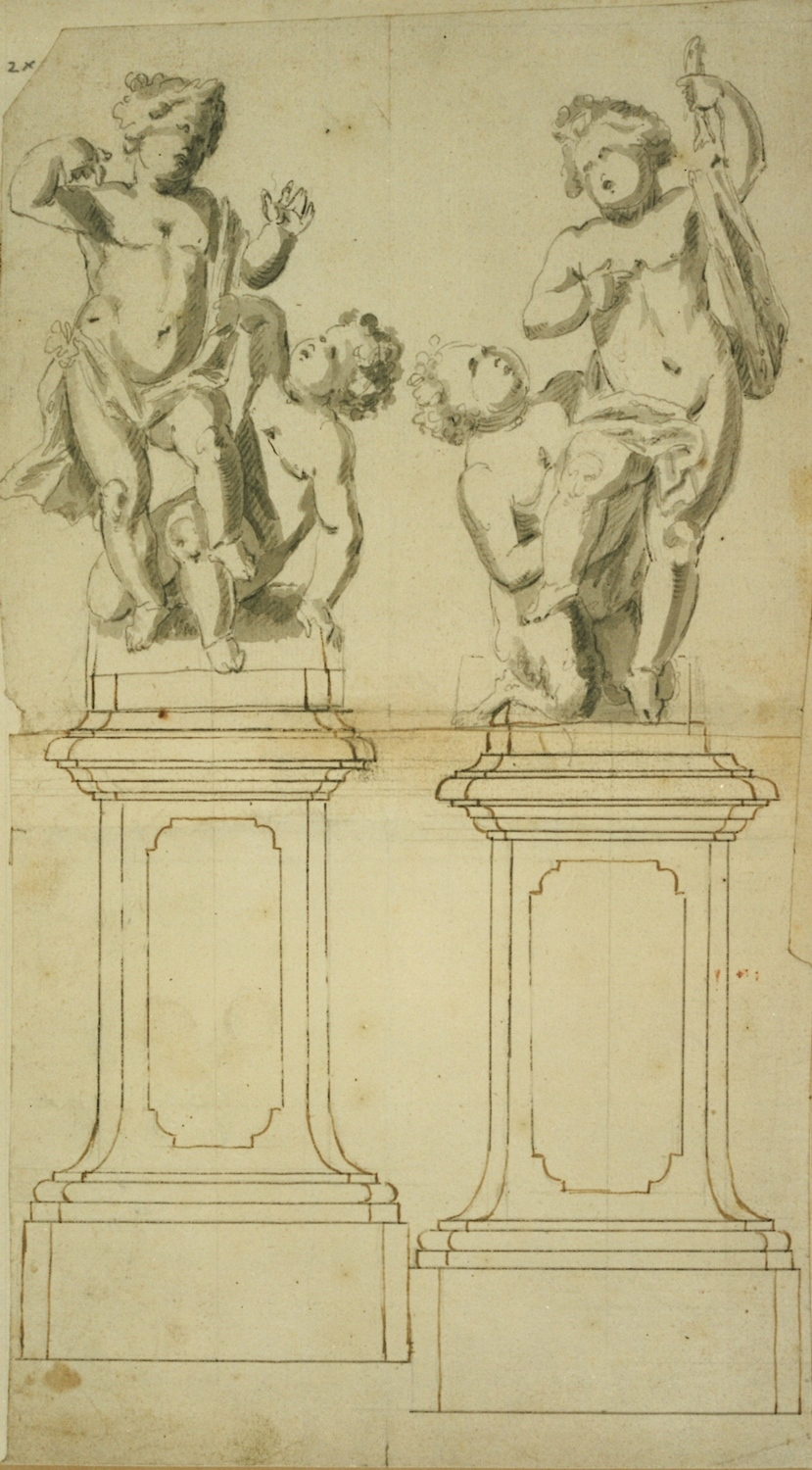

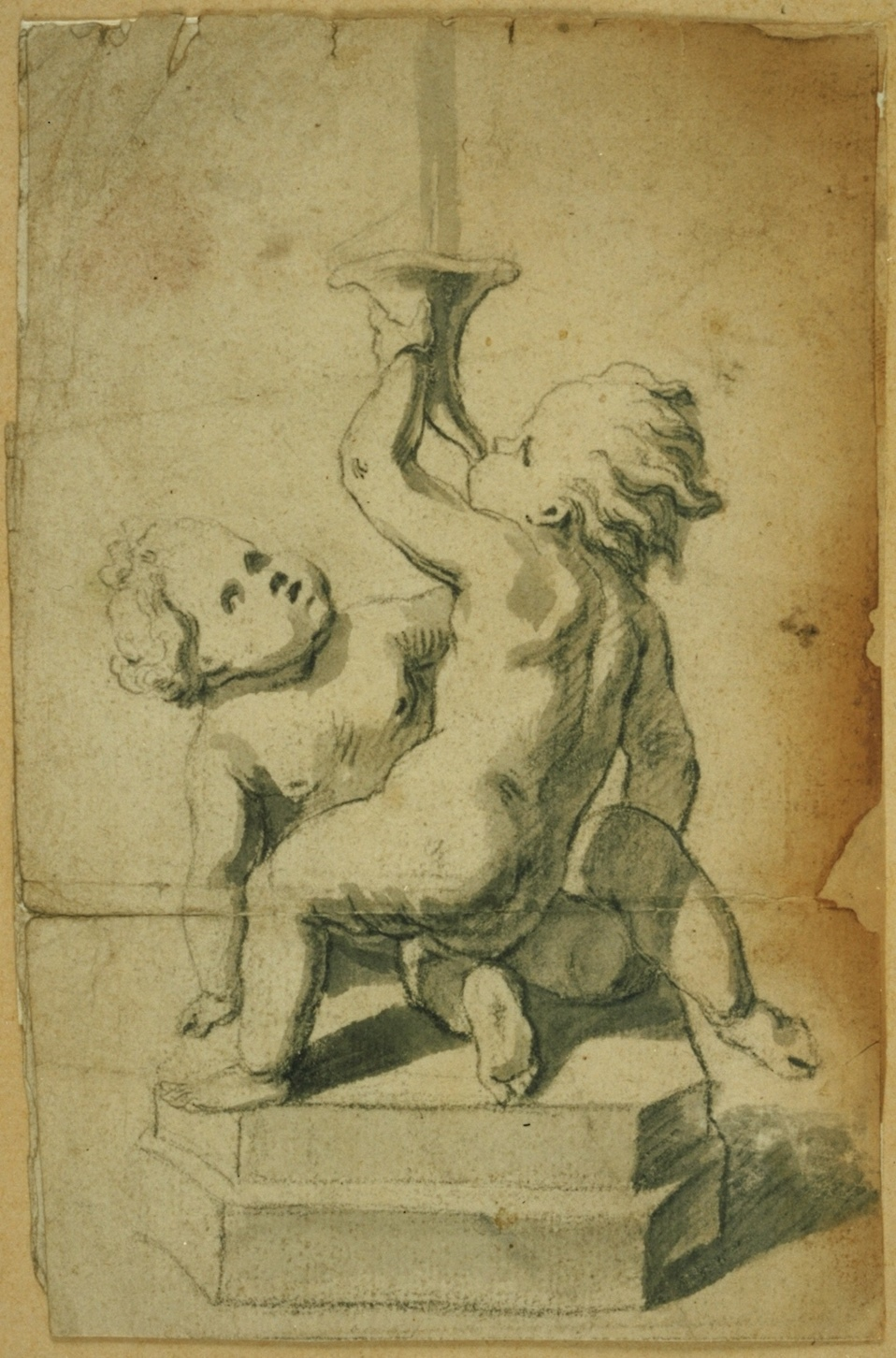

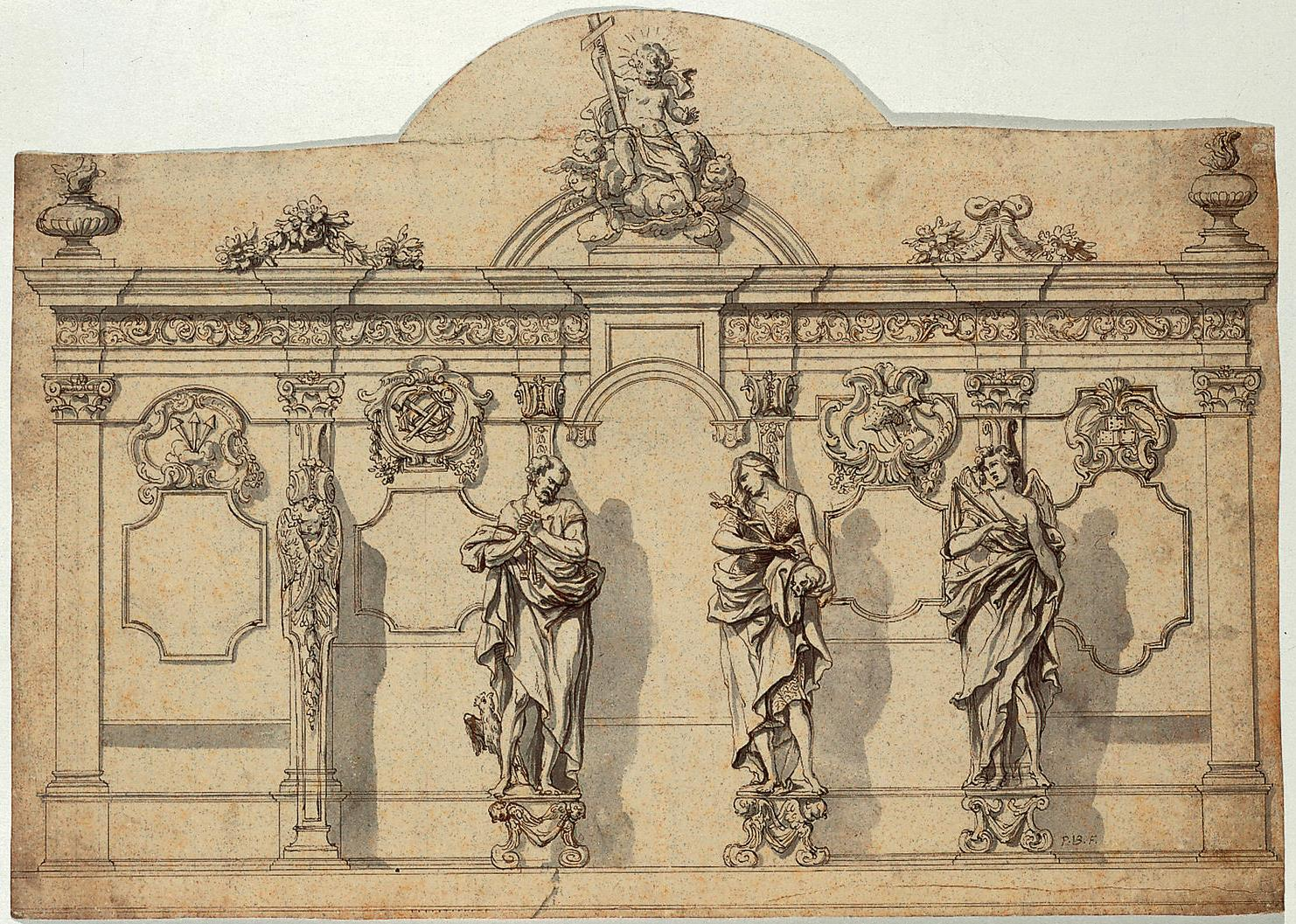

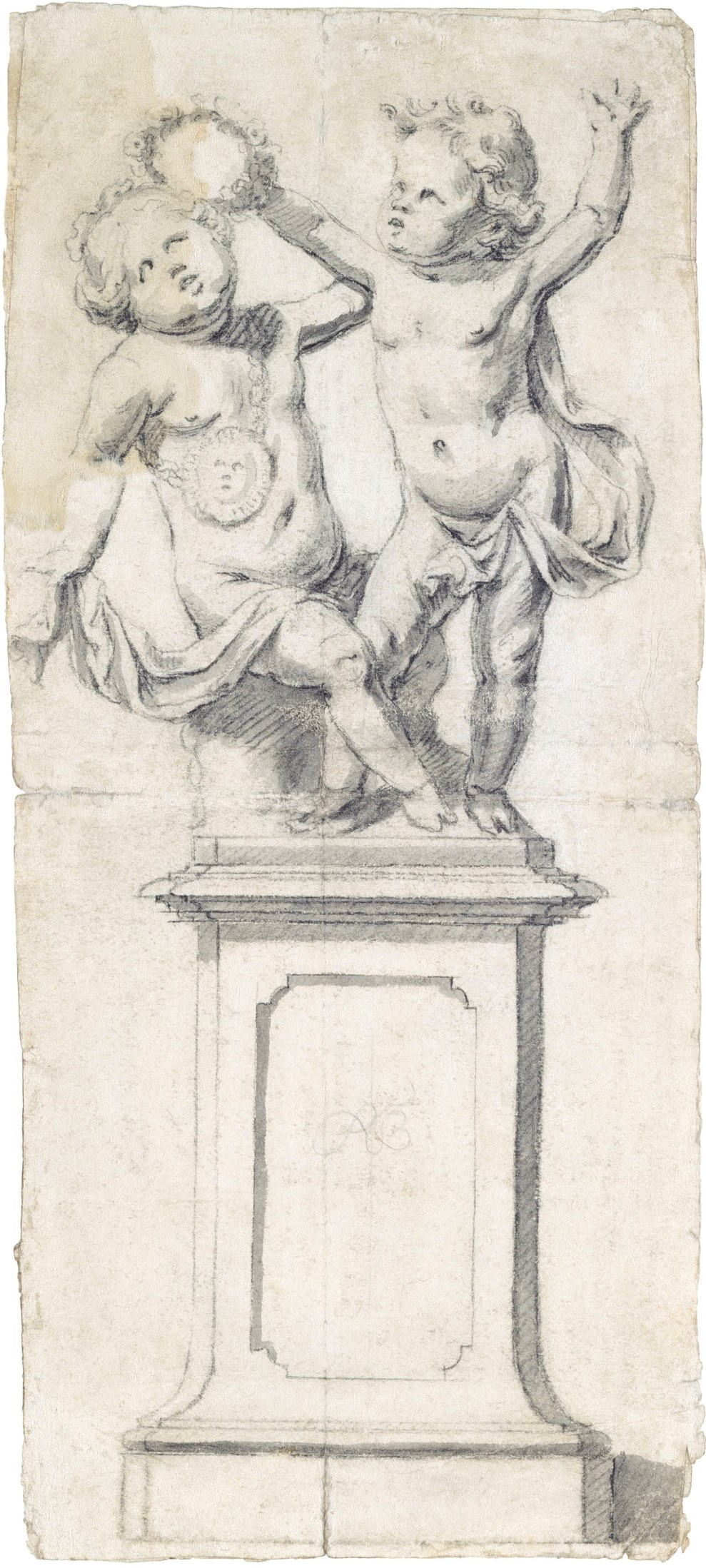

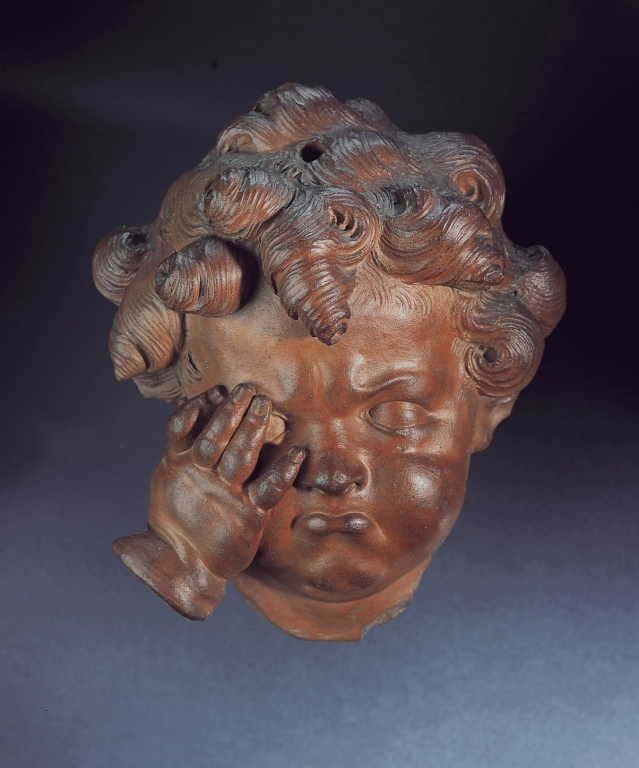

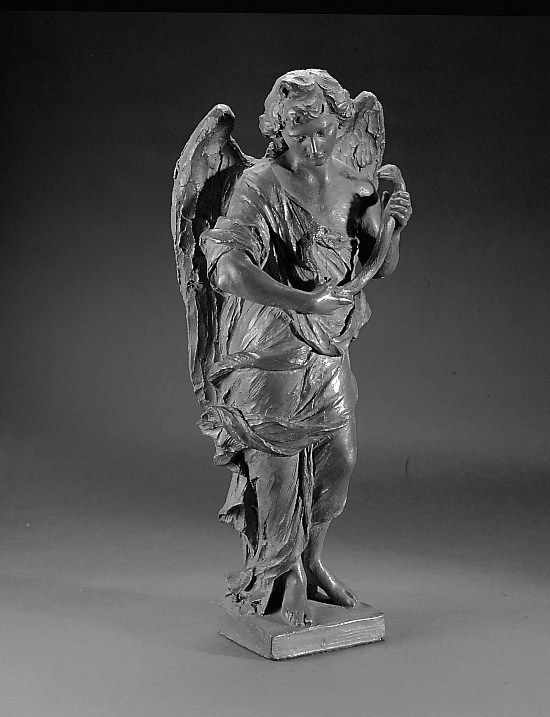
