= Pieter Scheemaeckers =

Flemish artist

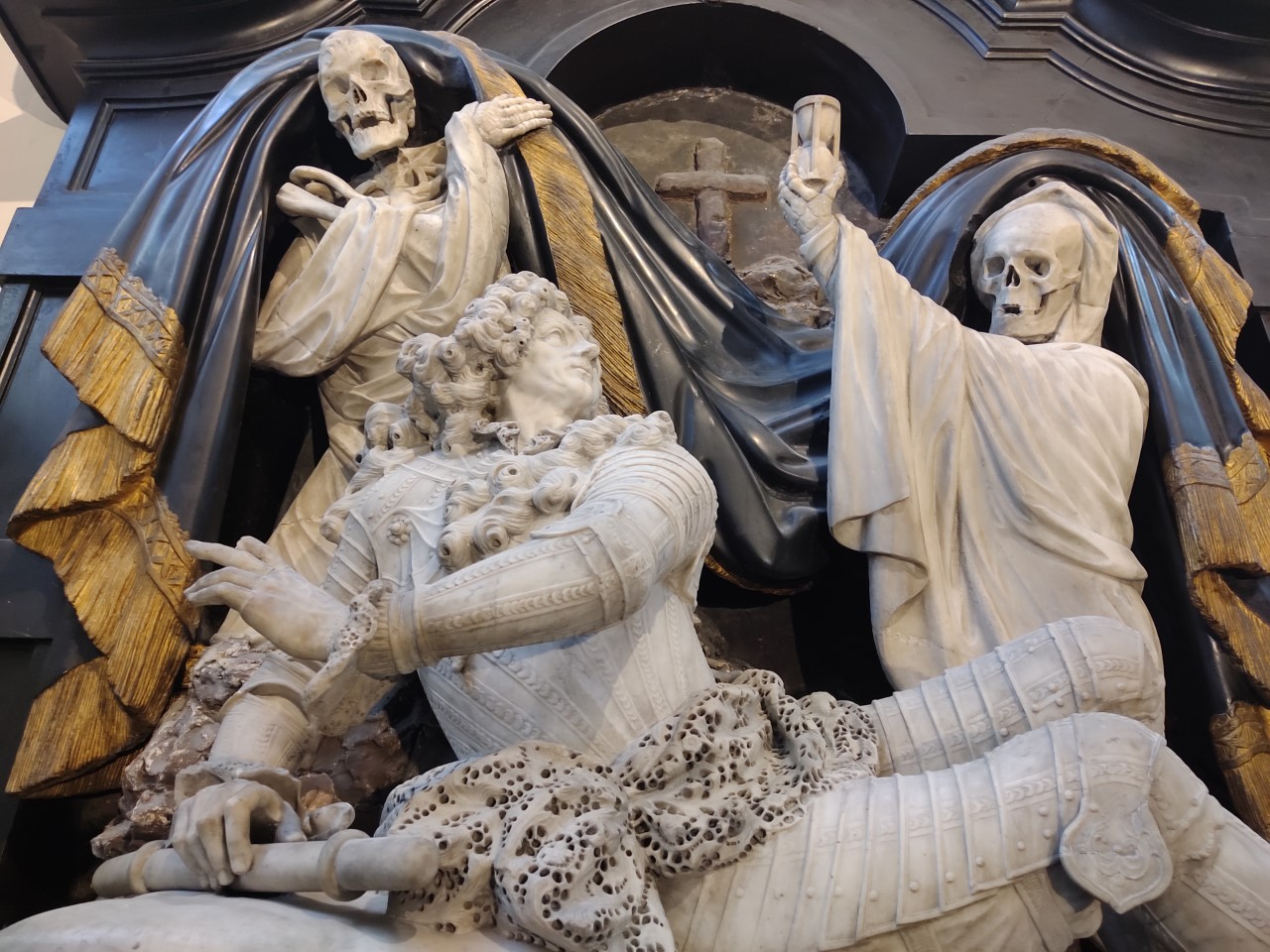
Funerary monument for Don Francisco Marcos de Velasco

Pieter Scheemaeckers, Pieter Scheemackers, Pieter Scheemaeckers I or Pieter Scheemaeckers the Elder (alternative spellings and form of first name: Peter, Peeter and Petrus) (1640, Antwerp – 1714, Antwerp) was a Flemish sculptor who played an important role in the development of Baroque church sculpture in the late 17th-century Habsburg Netherlands. He was also known for his marble funerary monuments and small scale ivory works. He was the father of Peter Scheemakers who became a leading sculptor of portraits and church monuments in 18th century London.

== Life ==
He was born in Antwerp where he was baptised on 10 August 1652. His mother was the sister of the prominent Antwerp Baroque sculptor Pieter Verbrugghen the Elder. Scheemaeckers trained with his uncle Pieter Verbrugghen the Elder. He was registered as a pupil in the local Guild of Saint Luke in the guild year 1660–61. He seems to have remained in the workshop of his uncle for quite some time as he was only registered as a master at the local Guild of Saint Luke in the guild year 1674–75. In 1699 he became dean of the Guild. He received many commissions from churches in his native Antwerp, as well as from churches and abbeys in the Duchy of Brabant.

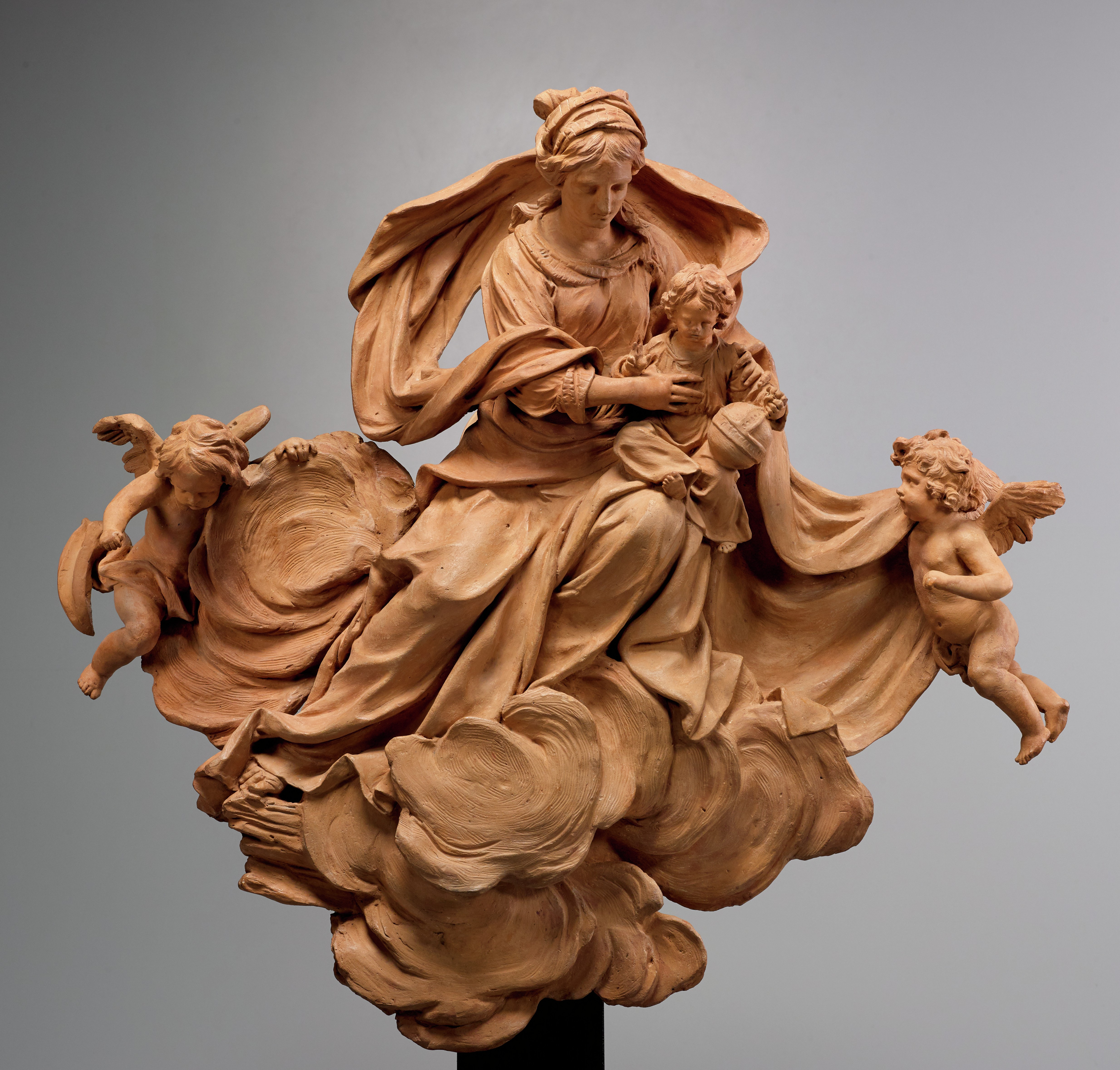
Virgin and child

He married Catharina Verhulst. Of his many children, two sons - Pieter and Hendrik - became sculptors who made a career in England. His marriage ended in an acrimonious divorce in 1707, that dragged on in the courts for several years. The testimony of various persons made on 2 July 1708 attests to the awful behaviour of Peeter I: he was said to mistreat his children, whom he called 'pigs' and to have beaten one of his daughters until she was unconscious. He was further accused of having threatened to destroy their house with a hammer and chisel.

In addition to his sons, he trained Jacob Rottiers, Joannes van de Wael (1677), Inghenasius Leysens (1680–81), Joseph Verhulst, Jan van Hoeck, Abraham Hynderickx (Hendericx) (1682–83), Jacobus Rottiers (1685–86), Peter van Tienen, Pauels de Decker (1687–88), Franciscus Sions (1688–89), Franciscus Geeregroot (1692–93), Philippus Terroude (1695–96), Judocus van Schoor, Theodor Geiregroot, Hendrick van Wetteren, Jacobus Vinckenboom (1697–98), Egidius Schoenmaeckers (1699–1700); Lenaert Batalie (1700–1701) and Jan van Rehabel (1701–1702). This great number of pupils shows the respect in which he was held. One of his most successful pupils was German-born Jan Pieter van Baurscheit who made a name in Antwerp as a sculptor and architect.

== Work ==
He produced mainly church sculpture and monumental tombs, in which he displayed a vivid imagination and a virtuoso execution. He also made ivory sculptures and drew many designs for other sculptors. His style is exemplary of the late Baroque in Flemish sculpture and shows the trend towards the Rococo in its pictorial and decorative effects.

One of the high points of his work is the funeral monument for Count Karel Florentijn van Salm (who died at the Siege of Maastricht) in St Catherine's church in Hoogstraten (completed in 1709). This monument, topped by flags, military trophies and the family blazon, depicts the deceased in full battle regalia. Grieving angels, a skull and an hourglass complete the funeral monument.

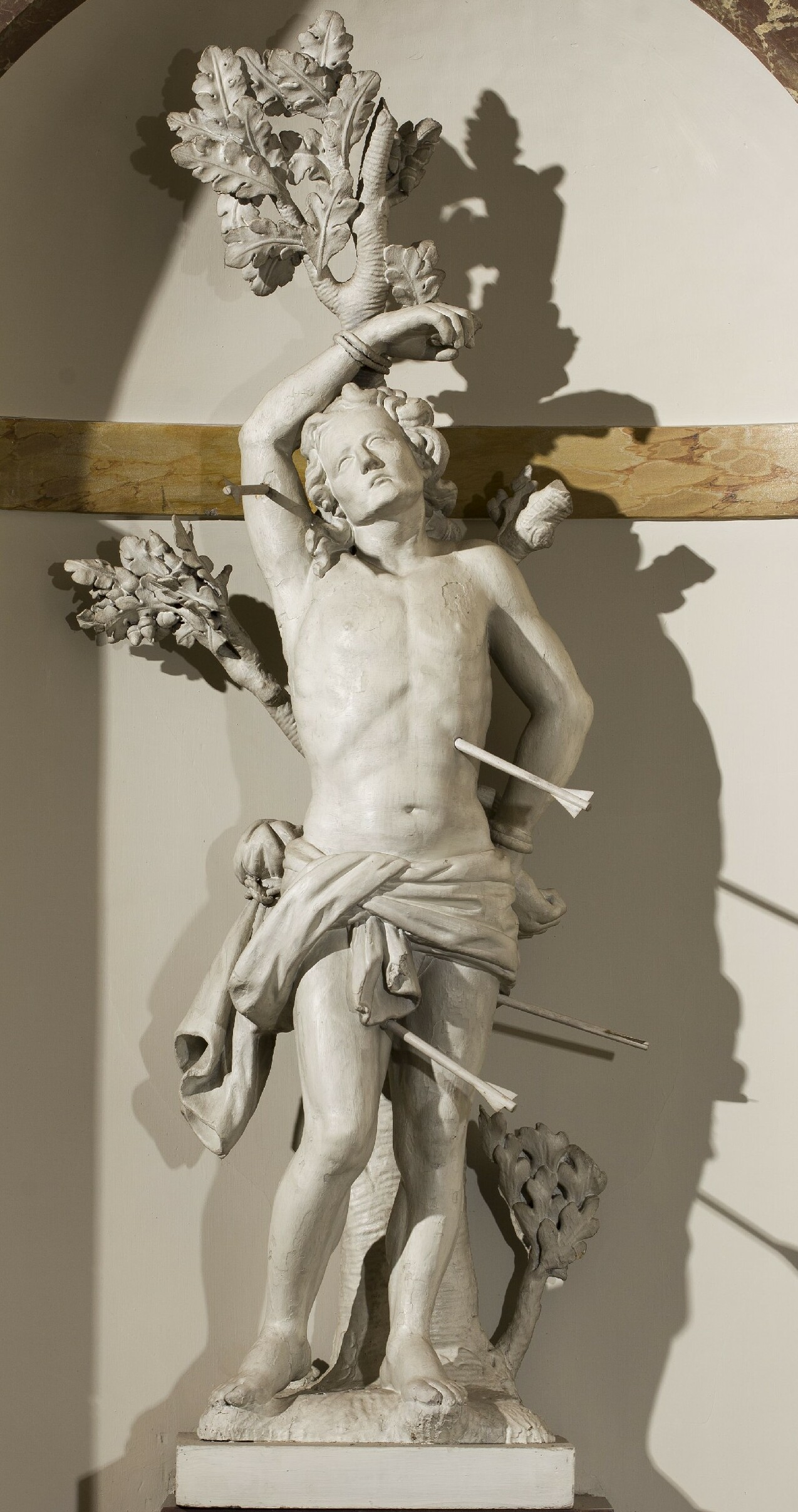
Martyrdom of St Sebastian

Another important funeral monument was that for Don Francisco Marcos de Velasco, the Spanish military governor and commander of the Citadel of Antwerp who had died in Antwerp on 17 June 1693. The monument was made for the church of the Citadel of Antwerp between 1684 and 1697 and moved from there to the Saint James Church in Antwerp in 1856. The monument is made in black marble on top of which are the marble statues of the sitting Don Francisco and two skeletons, one holding an hourglass as a sign of vanitas. At the top are the coat of arms of Don Francisco and various arms.

== Selected works ==
- 1664: Main altar in St Margaret's Church in the Beguinage of Lier, Belgium
- 1688: Funeral monument of the family Kuerlinckx-Van Delft in the Cathedral of Antwerp
- 1692: Two side altars (one of Our Lady and the other of St. Sebastian and the Holy Cross) in the St. Willibrord Church of Berchem
- 1693: Marble communion rails of St Amand's church in Geel
- 1693: Marble monument for Don Francisco Marcos de Velasco, Marquesss of Pico de Velasco - died 17 June 1693, buried in St. James' Church, Antwerp (attributed to Scheemaeckers)
- 1699-1700: Altar of St. Norbert's church in Averbode Abbey
- 1707: Pulpit for St. Martin's church, Venlo, the Netherlands
- 1709: Funerary monument for Count Karel Florentijn van Salm in St Catherine's Church, Hoogstraten
- c. 1710: Main altar in the Basilica of Our Lady of Kortenbos
