= St. Andrew's Church, Antwerp =

Church in Antwerp, Belgium

Coordinates: 51.2164°N 4.3981°E

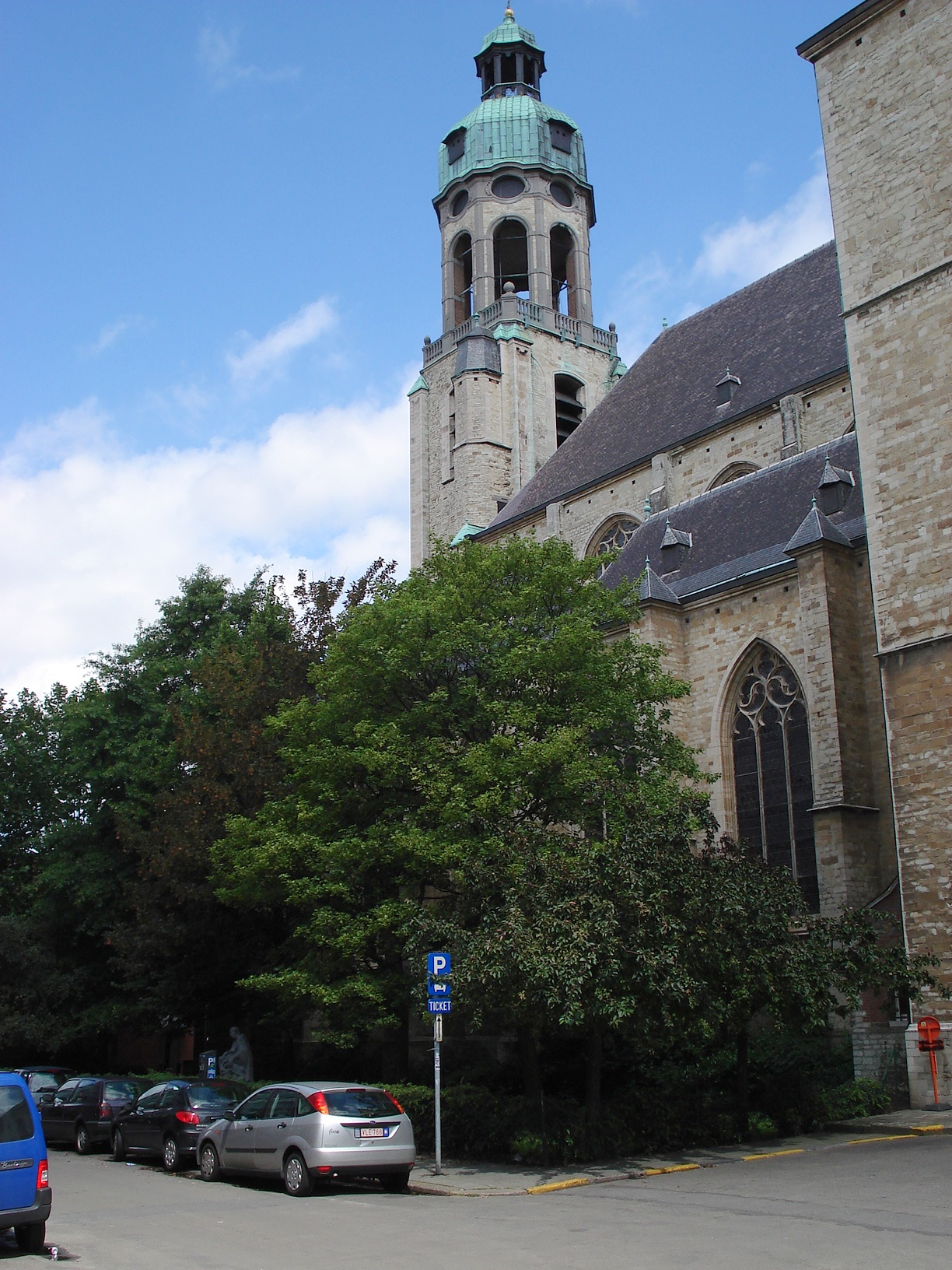
Exterior of St. Andrew's Church

St. Andrew's Church (Dutch: Sint-Andrieskerk) is a Catholic church in Antwerp built in the 16th century. Its exterior is mainly characterised by a late-Gothic style while its interior is decorated predominantly in the Baroque style. It is currently the parish church of the parish of St. Andrew's. In the 19th century, this parish was known as 'the parish of misery' as it was by then principally populated by poor people.

== History ==
In the early 16th century, the Observant Augustinian monastery in Enkhuizen, which was under the rule of the Saxon Congregation, sent some of its friars on a mission to Antwerp in 1510. Joost Hoens and Marc Mussche, prominent citizens of Antwerp, donated a house and plot of land on the Ridderstraat to them. They built a chapel on the site, which was consecrated to the Holy Trinity in 1513. The existing Chapter of Our Lady objected and brought a lawsuit, in which they initially prevailed, but relented after the Augustinians received support from the city administration, which was even willing to cover the costs of building the monastery. The agreement that was reached shows that there were eight Augustinians, led by Prior Johannes van Mechelen. Since the original chapel turned out to be too small, they began building a larger church. In doing so, they laid the first stones of the present St. Andrew's Church.

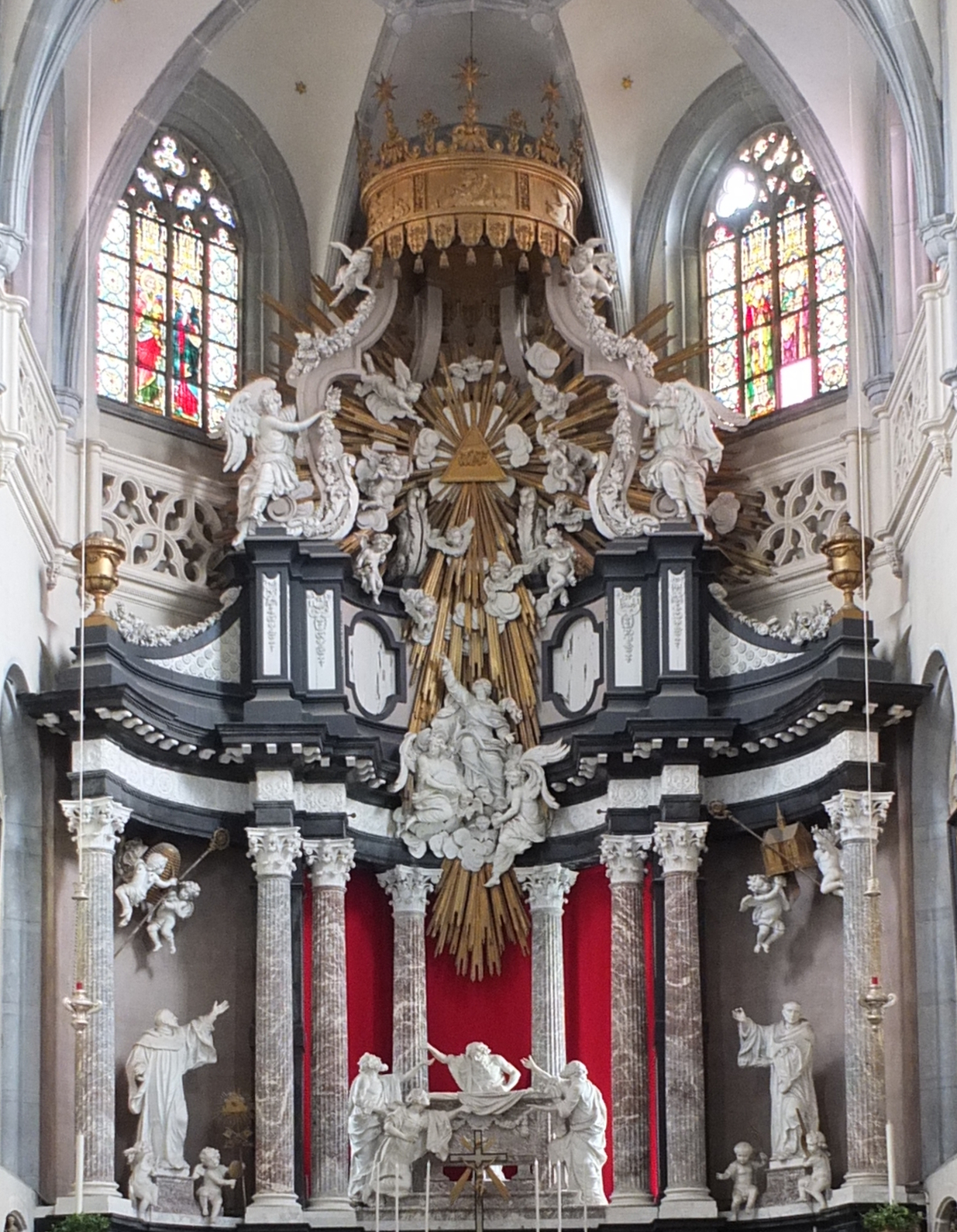
High Altar by Willem Ignatius Kerricx

The Augustinian friars in Antwerp declared allegiance to the Lutheran doctrine in 1517. The government dissolved the monastery and arrested all the friars on 6 October 1522. The next day, the monastery was walled up and its furnishings sold at a public auction. With the permission of Emperor Charles V, Margaret of Austria, the Governor of the Habsburg Netherlands, had the monastery demolished in early 1523. By then, thirteen Augustinians had recanted their heresy, but three others refused. Two of them, Jan van Essen and Hendrik Vos, were burned at the stake on 1 July 1523 on the Grand Place in Brussels.

It was then decided to convert the former monastery property into a parish church. Governor Margaret of Austria supported this plan and the Dutch Pope Adrian VI signed the bull of foundation for the new parish in the summer of 1523. The parish was dedicated to Saint Andrew, patron saint of Burgundy, in honor of Margaret of Austria (whose mother was of the House of Burgundy). In 1527 the site was sold and parceled to finance the construction of the church. The former convent chapel was expanded and then consecrated as a parish church in 1529. The church was later expanded with a tower in the west and a transept.

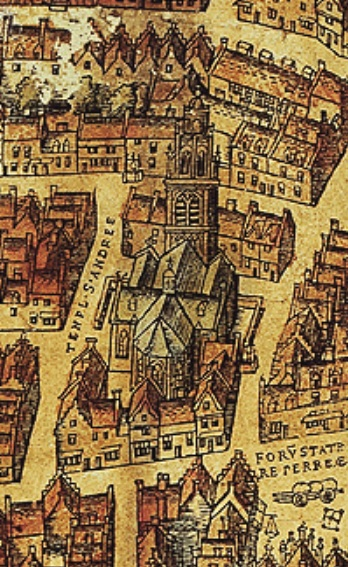
St. Andrew's church in 1565

In 1549, city politician and ecclesiastic Nicolaas Beukelaer endowed the church with a prebendary to assist with the administration of the church. During the Beeldenstorm of 1566 the church interior was destroyed. The church was divided up between Catholics and Calvinists in 1568. In 1579 the division was made permanent through the construction of a dividing wall. In 1581 the Calvinists denied the Catholics access to the church and demolished the part of the church that was assigned to the Catholics. After the Fall of Antwerp in 1585 and the defeat of the Calvinists, the church was returned to the Catholics. The church was decorated with new altar pieces by leading Antwerp artists such as Otto van Veen, Maerten de Vos and one of the many members of the Francken family who lived nearby.

In the middle of the 17th century a large construction campaign was started. First an arch was built over the nave and the transept destroyed by the Calvinists was rebuilt and expanded. In subsequent years, the church was further expanded with a choir with two bays and later with two chapels. In 1755 the tower of the church collapsed and a new Baroque tower designed by Engelbert Baets was constructed inside the western bay of the nave.

During the French revolutionary occupation starting in 1794, the church was saved by the decision of the priest Jan-Michiel Timmermans to swear allegiance to the French regime. The church lost some of its silver, the triptych by Maerten de Vos and the statue of St. Peter by Artus Quellinus I to confiscation by the French. After the Concordat of 1801 between Napoleon and the Pope, the church became again the parish church of the Parish of St. Andrew's in 1802 and the confiscated St. Peter statue was returned. It would take longer to recover the Marten de Vos triptych which finally ended up in the Museum of Fine Arts, Antwerp.

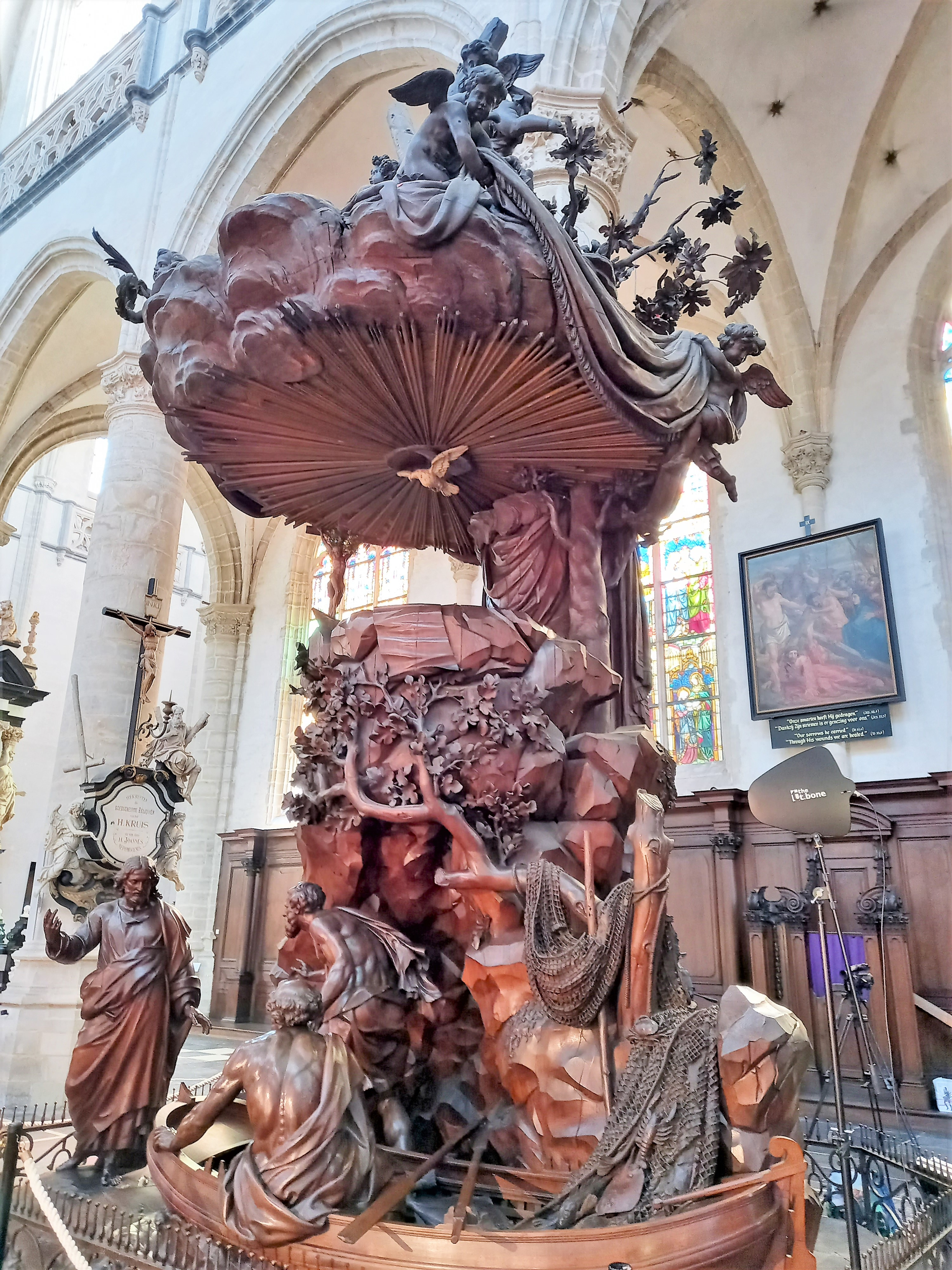
Pulpit by Jan Baptist Van Hool and Jan Frans van Geel

In the early 19th century, more Baroque furniture and paintings, mainly retrieved from churches and monasteries destroyed or closed during the French occupation, were added to the church. The church suffered major damage during the Dutch bombardment of Antwerp in 1830 and burnt down partially. From 1863 the church was fitted out with new stained glass windows in Gothic Revival style. The stained glass windows on the north side were destroyed on 2 January 1945 through the explosion of a German V-1 flying bomb. These were later replaced by windows designed by Jan Huet.

== Church art ==
The church contains many valuable artefacts and art works. It holds a monument erected by Barbara Mowbray in memory of Mary, Queen of Scots, by Robert and Jan De Nole (1620) with a portrait painted on copper by Frans Pourbus the Younger (1569-1622).

There are many paintings by Antwerp's leading painters such as Ambrosius Francken (1544-1618), Otto van Veen (1560-1629), Hendrick van Balen (1575-1632), Maarten Pepyn (1575-1643), Frans Francken the Younger (1581-1642), the workshop of Anthony van Dyck (1599-1641), Erasmus Quellinus the Younger (1607-78), Theodoor Boeyermans and Karel Verlat (1845–57).

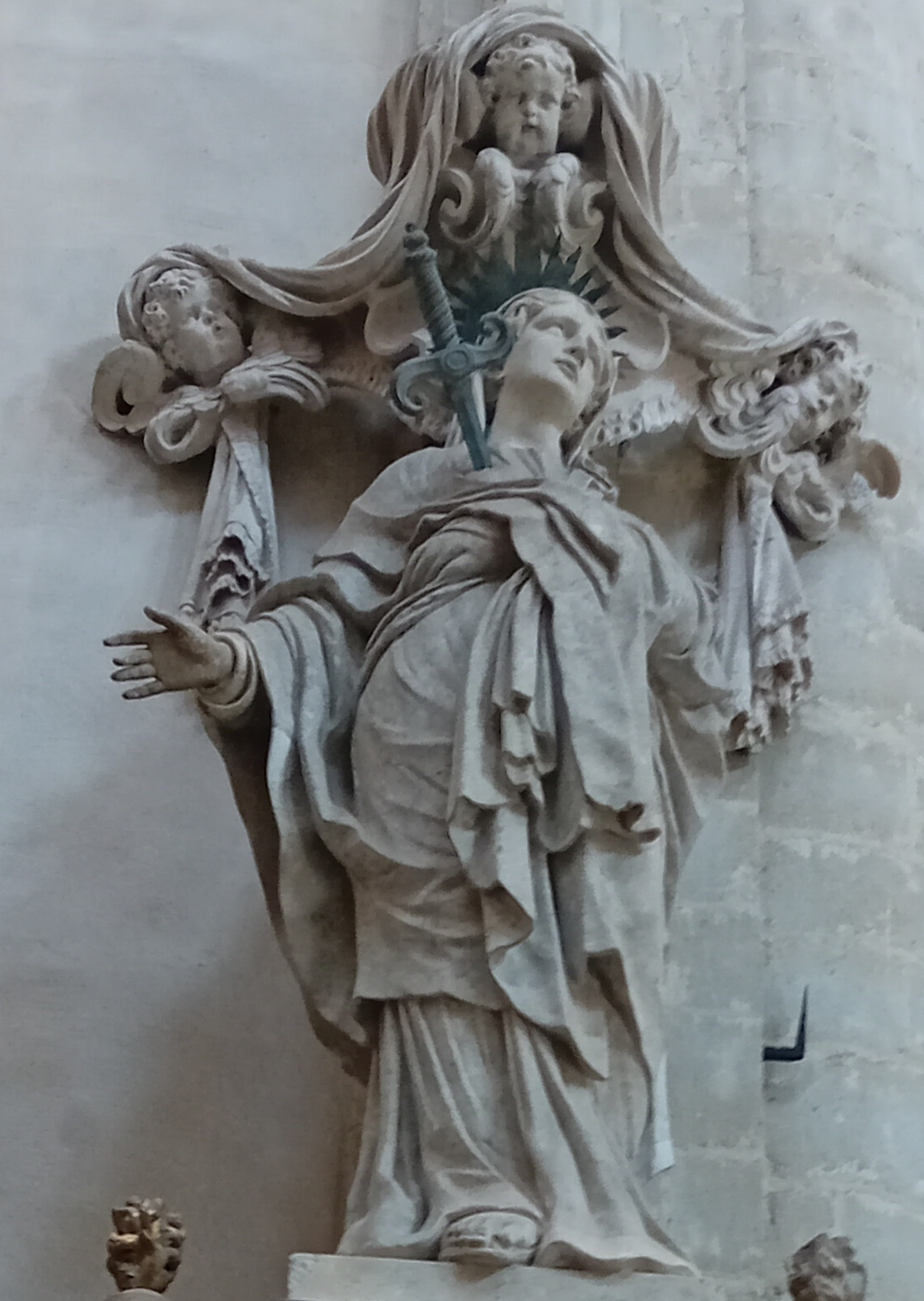
Our Lady of Sorrows pierced by a sword by Lodewijk Willemsens

Many of the church's furnishings are distinctly in the Baroque style, as earlier pieces had been destroyed during the 16th century Beeldenstorm. The church furniture is made by some of the leading sculptors of their time. The High Altar was originally from the former St. Bernard Abbey. The predella is the work of Pieter Verbrugghen I (1665) and the high altar itself the work of Willem Ignatius Kerricx (1729). The choir stalls was originally made for the convent of the Augustinian friars by Pieter Verbrugghen I. The sacrament altar and confessional in the Our Lady's Chapel are by Lodewijk Willemsens (1630-1703). The Holy Cross Altar is by Cornelis van Mildert (1664), the St. Anna Shrine is by Jan van den Cruyce (1674), while the Our Lady Altar was made by Peeter Vervoort, Willem Kerricx and his son Willem Ignatius Kerricx (1729). The pulpit is by Jan Baptist Van Hool and Jan Frans van Geel (1821). The organ case is the work of Engelbert Baets (1779).

Many of the church's features were restored in the 1970s. In 2001, the church's statue of the Virgin Mary dated 1585 (referred to as Our Lady of Succour and Victory) was dressed in modern clothes designed by local fashion designer Ann Demeulemeester to commemorate Antwerp's "Fashion Year".

== See also ==
- List of Catholic churches in Belgium
