= August Keersmaekers =

August Albert Keersmaekers (1920–2009) was a Belgian literary scholar, with a particular interest in Dutch-language literature of the 17th through to early 20th centuries, and the literature of the Kempen. He identified a number of poems by Gerbrand Bredero, which had been assumed to reflect incidents in the poet's own life, as translations of French originals, fundamentally changing the understanding of Bredero's character and literary career.

== Life ==
Keersmaekers was born in Retie on 26 October 1920, the youngest of five children in a farming family. He was educated at the local primary school and then at the Minor Seminary in Hoogstraten. In 1938 the family moved to Arendonk, and August matriculated at the Catholic University of Leuven. During his years as a student he was also involved in literary and cultural activities. In 1942 he graduated Licentiate in Germanic Philology, with an additional certificate for teaching in secondary education.

After graduating he taught at the state secondary school in Turnhout until 1958. In 1945 he married Maria Ooms (1923–2009), with whom he would have ten children.

In 1952 he completed a doctoral dissertation on Willem van Nieulandt II, and in 1961 he became a lecturer at the Facultés Universitaires Saint-Louis in Brussels. In 1963 he added courses at a college of commercial education in Antwerp. From 1969 until his retirement on 1 October 1986, he taught at the Jesuit university in Antwerp.

Keersmaekers was a member of numerous literary and scholarly societies, and in 1978 he was elected to the Royal Academy of Dutch Language and Literature, in succession to the recently deceased Stephanus Axters. He was acting president of the academy in 1988 and in 1994.

His wife died on 12 April 2009, and he died the following 28 September, at home in Duffel, where he had lived since 1963.

== Bibliography ==
Over the course of his lifetime Keersmaekers wrote at least 498 publications, not counting over 200 book reviews. The most significant of these are:

- Het milde leven (1946)
- De dichter Guilliam van Nieuwelandt en de Senecaans-classieke tragedie in de Zuidelijke Nederlanden (1957)
- "De onbekende Bredero", Spiegel der letteren, 11 (1968–1969), pp. 81–97.
- Felix Timmermans: een wonder van eenvoud (1990)
- Het geluk van de schrijver: Felix Timmermans en zijn Pallieter (2000)
