= Willem Ignatius Kerricx =

Flemish sculptor & artist (1682–1745)

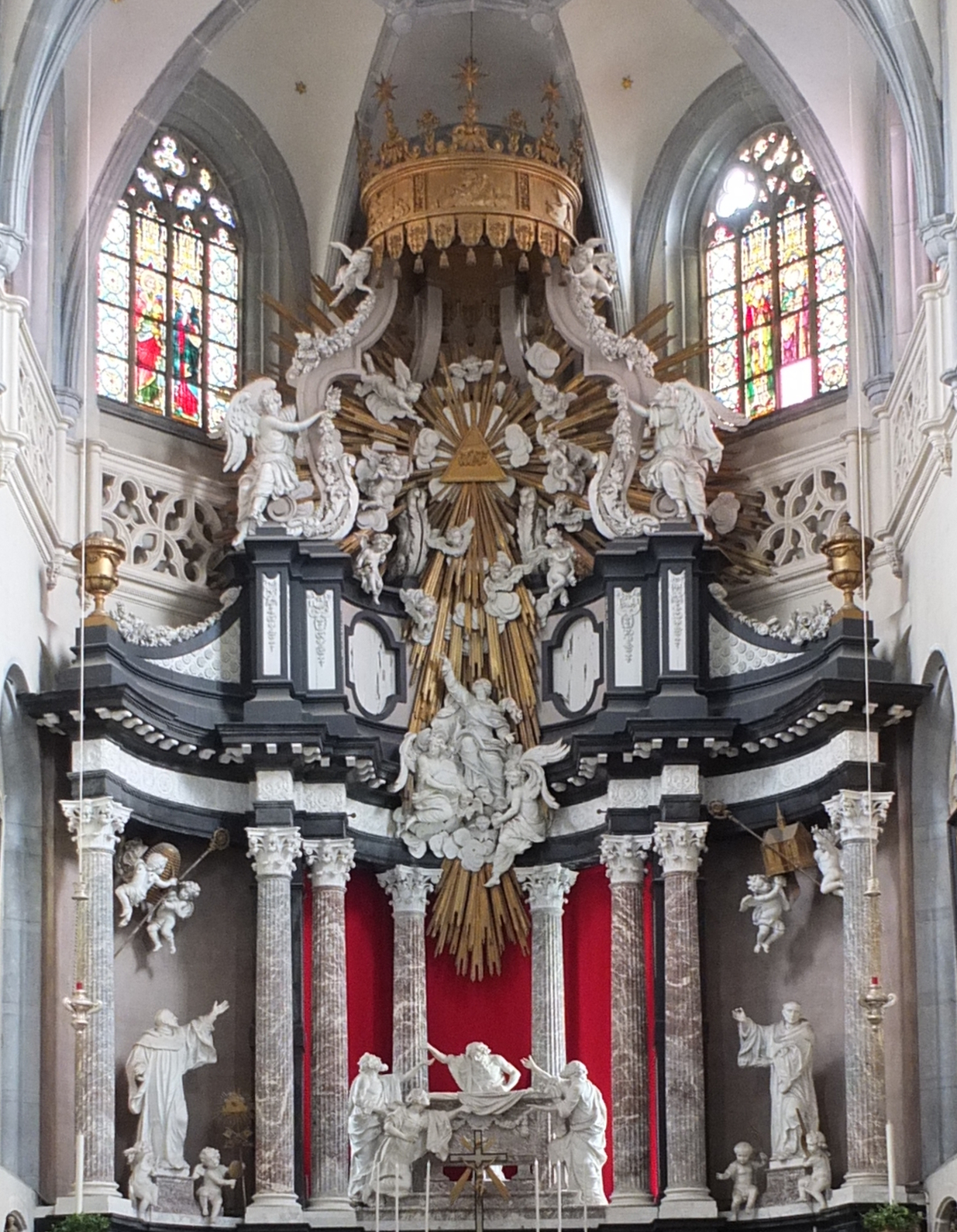
High altar of the St Andrew's Church, Antwerp

Willem Ignatius Kerricx (Antwerp, baptized on 22 April 1682 – Antwerp, 4 January 1745) was a Flemish sculptor, painter, draftsman, architect, engineer, playwright and author active in Antwerp in the first half of the 18th century. His sculptural works comprise mostly sculptured church furniture, individual sculptures, mainly statues of saints for churches and a few funerary monuments. His sculptural style is typical for the late Flemish Baroque while he shows a preference for Classicism in his architectural projects. He took over the large family sculpture workshop in Antwerp. As a painter he created both history paintings for churches and still lifes. He was also employed as an architect and engineer, mainly on reconstruction projects. In his youth, he composed a number of comedies and tragedies for the Antwerp theatre.

== Life ==
Kerricx was born in Antwerp as the eldest son of the sculptor Willem Kerricx and the poet Barbara Ogier, the daughter of the Antwerp playwright Willem Ogier. He was baptized in the St Walburga Church of Antwerp on 22 April 1682. His father operated a large sculpture workshop in Antwerp. His great-grandfather, also called Willem Ignatius, was a sculptor as was his great-uncle Jan Kerricx. Of his two younger siblings, his sister Catharina Clara became a painter and aquarellist.

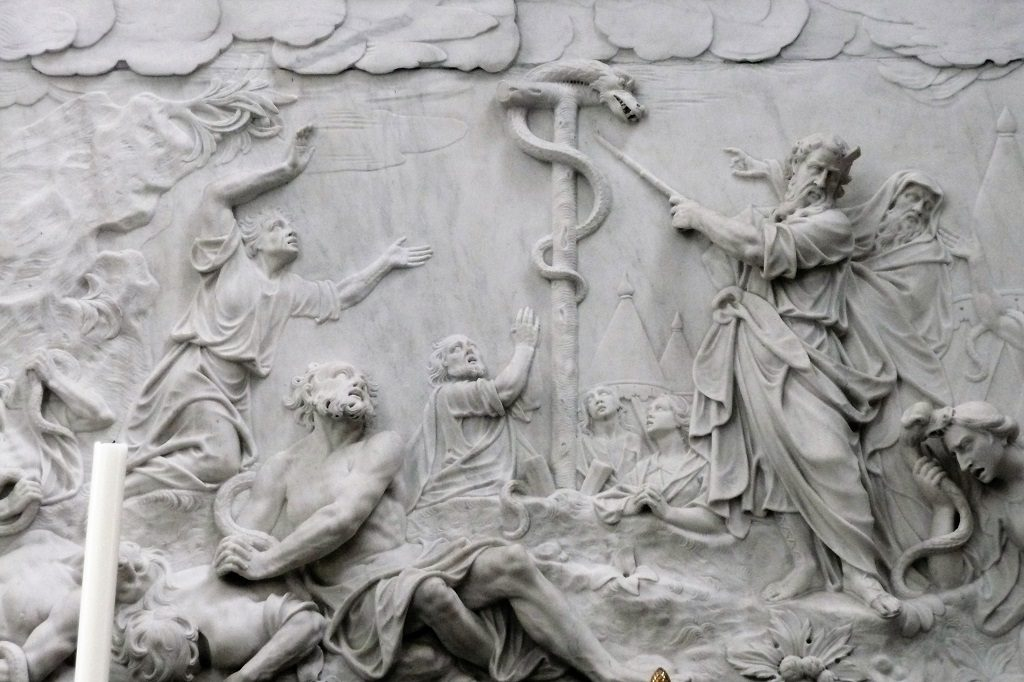
The raising of the brass snake

He obtained his artistic training in his father's workshop. Some art historical literature states that he studied painting with Godfried Maes or in the workshop of Godfried Maes, the prominent history painter and dean of the Guild, although he was never formally registered as a pupil of this master in the records of the Antwerp Guild of Saint Luke. In his early years, Kerricx displayed, like his parents, an interest in the theatre. Already on 8 April 1700, at only 18 years of age, he was elected the 'factor' (chief playwright and stage director) of the local chamber of rhetoric de Olijftak (Olive Branch). The chamber of rhetoric organised the staging of plays and other performances. Both his mother and grandfather played important roles in the Olijftak. Under his motto "Konst wint jonst" (Art wins favour) he wrote a number of plays until the year 1705. He was admitted to the Antwerp Guild of Saint Luke as a master painter and sculptor in the guild year 1703–1704. He did not need to pay the admission in return for services rendered. From then on he concentrated on his busy work as a sculptor, architect and painter and abandoned his writing career.

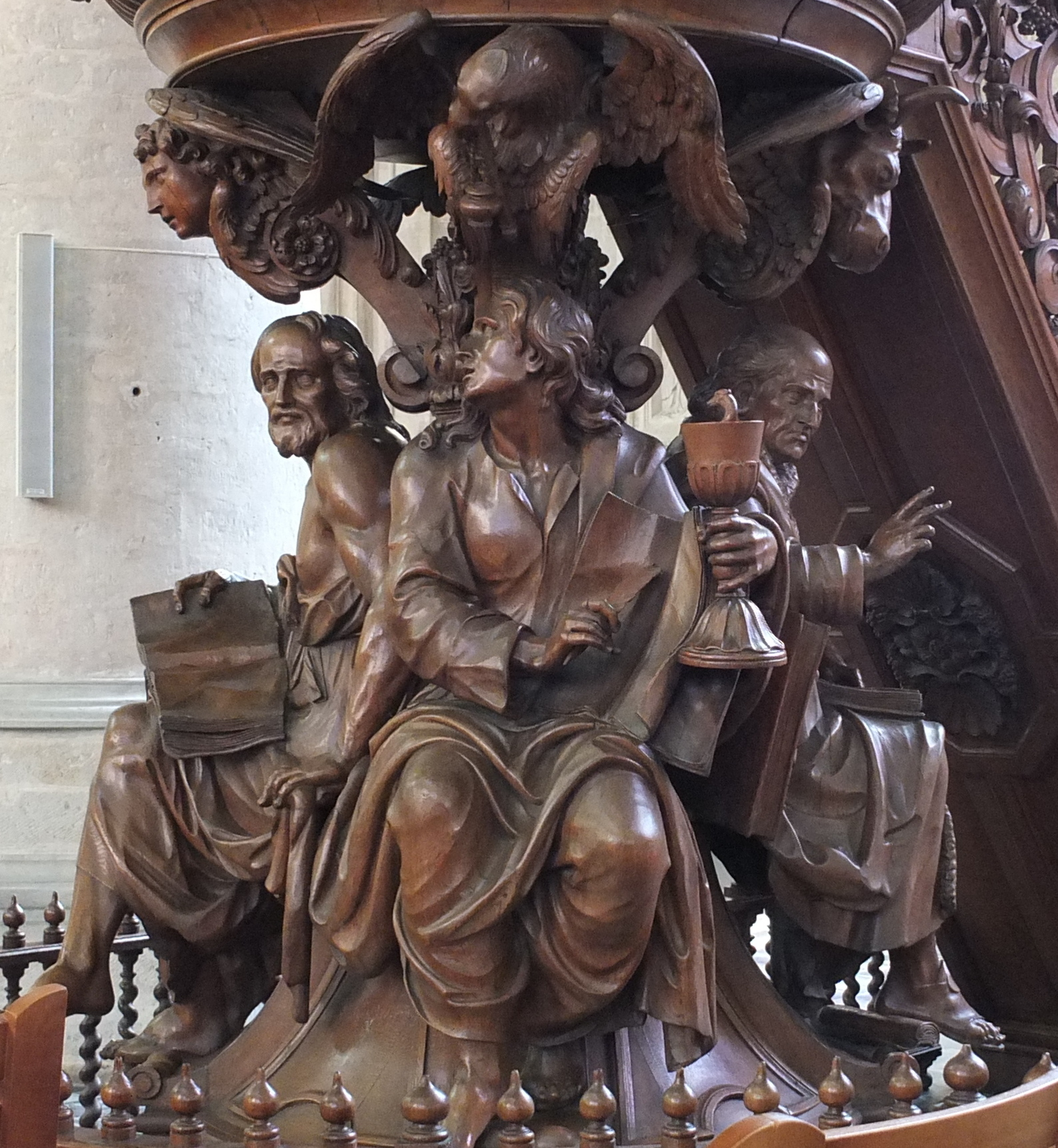
Pulpit with the four evangelists, Onze-Lieve-Vrouw over de Dijlekerk, iMechelen)

On 22 July 1709 he married in Antwerp Joanna Maria van Hengsthoven (Hencxthoven), a daughter of the medical doctor Franciscus Gommaris van Hengsthoven. The couple had 7 children, of whom only one daughter survived. He was dean of the Guild of St. Luke in the guild years 1718–1719 and 1723–1724.

He received numerous commissions from local religious institutions. In 1713 he and Michiel van der Voort the Elder received the commission to make confessionals for the Saint Bernard's Abbey in Hemiksem. These were moved to Antwerp Cathedral after the Abbey was confiscated during the French occupation. Around 1718, he sculpted a new pulpit for the Church of Our Lady-across-the-Dyle (Onze-Lieve-Vrouw over de Dijlekerk) in Mechelen. In 1724 he received the commission to design the new city hall of Diest. From 1725 to 1732 he worked as an architect, sculptor and painter on the decorations for the Tongerlo Abbey, in particular the abbot's residence. In 1629 he created the high altar for the St. Bernard Abbey in Hemiksem (now in the St. Andrew's Church, Antwerp). He worked also on the design and implementation of the restoration and stabilisation of the Saint Walburga Church in Antwerp (demolished during the French occupation). Around 1744 he created two altars in the church of the Capuchins in Dendermonde.

Willem Ignatius Kerricx operated a busy workshop in Antwerp as from 1704 onwards, he employed various apprentices who came to study painting as well as sculpture with him. They included Jacobus de Hollander (1704), Jacobus van Innoville, Joannes Baptista Kints (1711) and Egidius van den Busdom (1713).

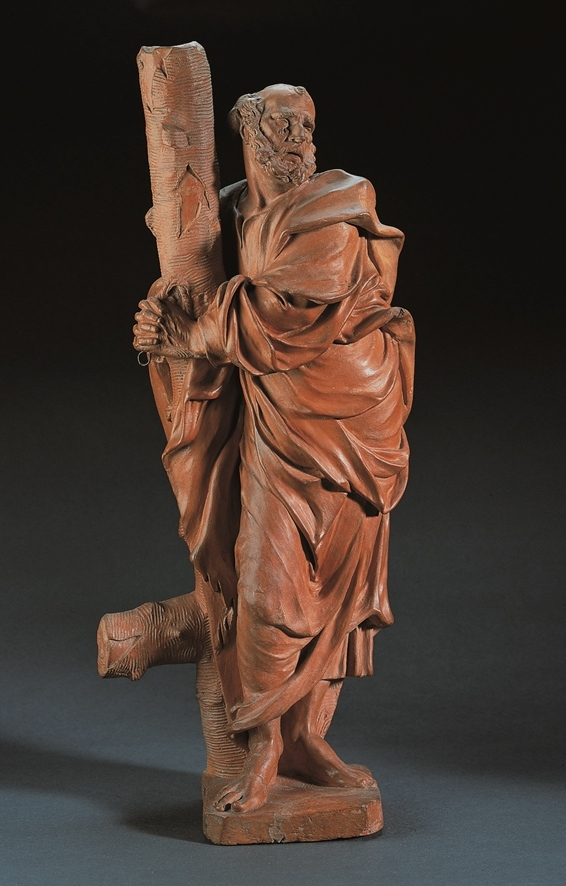
Design for a statue of St Peter

In 1744 he was put in charge of the decoration project on the occasion of the Joyous Entry into Antwerp of the new governor of the Spanish Netherlands Prince Charles of Lorraine and the Archduchess. He spent all his energy on this project. He contracted pneumonia as a result of overexerting himself during the creation of the triumphal arches for the celebration. He died in Antwerp on 4 January 1745 not long after the festivities had ended. He was buried on 7 January 1745 in the St. Paul's Church in Antwerp, where his father, mother, wife and in-laws were also buried.

== Work ==
=== Sculpture ===
He did not generally sign his works. His oeuvre has therefore been attributed based on archival materials. He created mostly sculptured church furniture and individual statues, principally statues of saints and biblical figures. He worked in many materials including wood, marble and terracotta. The terracotta works were typically studies for larger works to be executed in marble or wood. He produced principally for the churches and monasteries in the Duchy of Brabant. Many of his works are no longer located in the churches for which they were made as they were displaced as a consequence of the confiscation and destruction of churches and the dissolution of religious orders during the French occupation at the end of the 18th century. His work blends the Flemish Baroque style with French Classicism and Rococo elements.

Kerricx created many altars for churches. Typical for the last phase of Baroque altar architecture in the Southern Netherlands is the use of life-size statues of figures in three-dimensional sculpture. One of his masterpieces is the High altar of the St Andrew's Church, Antwerp. It was created for the St. Bernard Abbey in Hemiksem but later moved to the St. Andrew's Church, Antwerp due to the abbey community having been abolished during the French occupation. The High Altar represents the Assumption of the Virgin in a very theatrical manner. At the bottom are life-size figures who stand next to the empty grave of the Virgin. Their gestures show their amazement at her transition to the next world. The Virgin is in the middle being carried upward by angels in mid-relief. Heaven, life's ultimate purpose ín the Catholic belief system, is at the top of the altar. God's presence is indicated by the Hebrew four-letter word for God in a flat triangle, which itself refers to the Holy Trinity. The central scene is flanked by life-size statues of St Bernard and St Robert of Molesme.

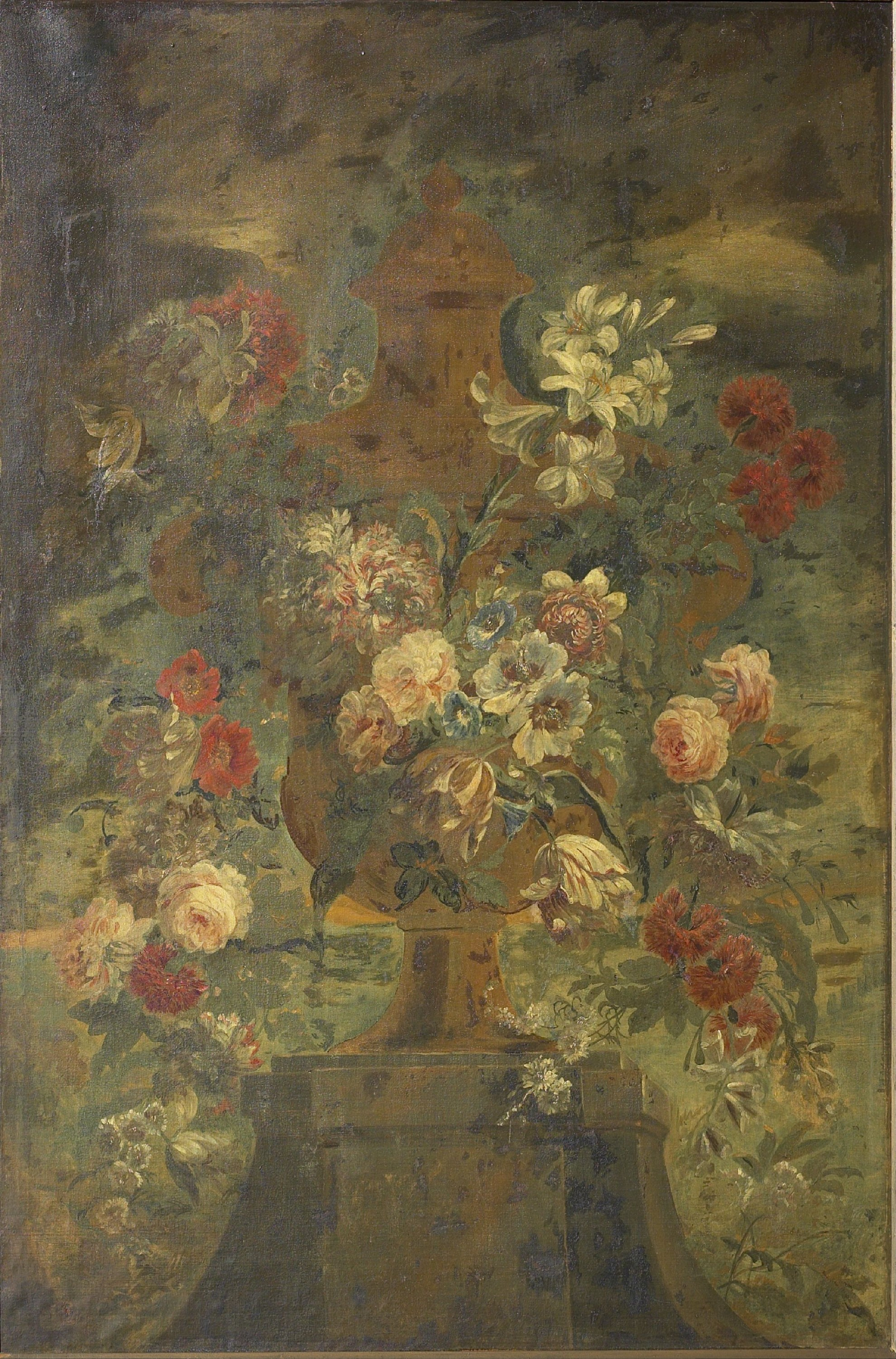
Still life of flowers

The Onze-Lieve-Vrouwkerk in Kruibeke holds many of his wooden artworks: a communion rail (1712), choir-stalls (1714), the altar of St Blasius (1722) and four statues for the confessionals (1733). His wooden pulpits can also been found in the Church of St Amandus in Geel (1715), the Church of St Ludgerus in Zele (1716), the Onze-Lieve-Vrouw over de Dijle Church in Mechelen (1718), the Church of St Lambertus in Heist-op-den-Berg (1737) and the Saint Sulpitius and Dionysius Church in Diest (1738).

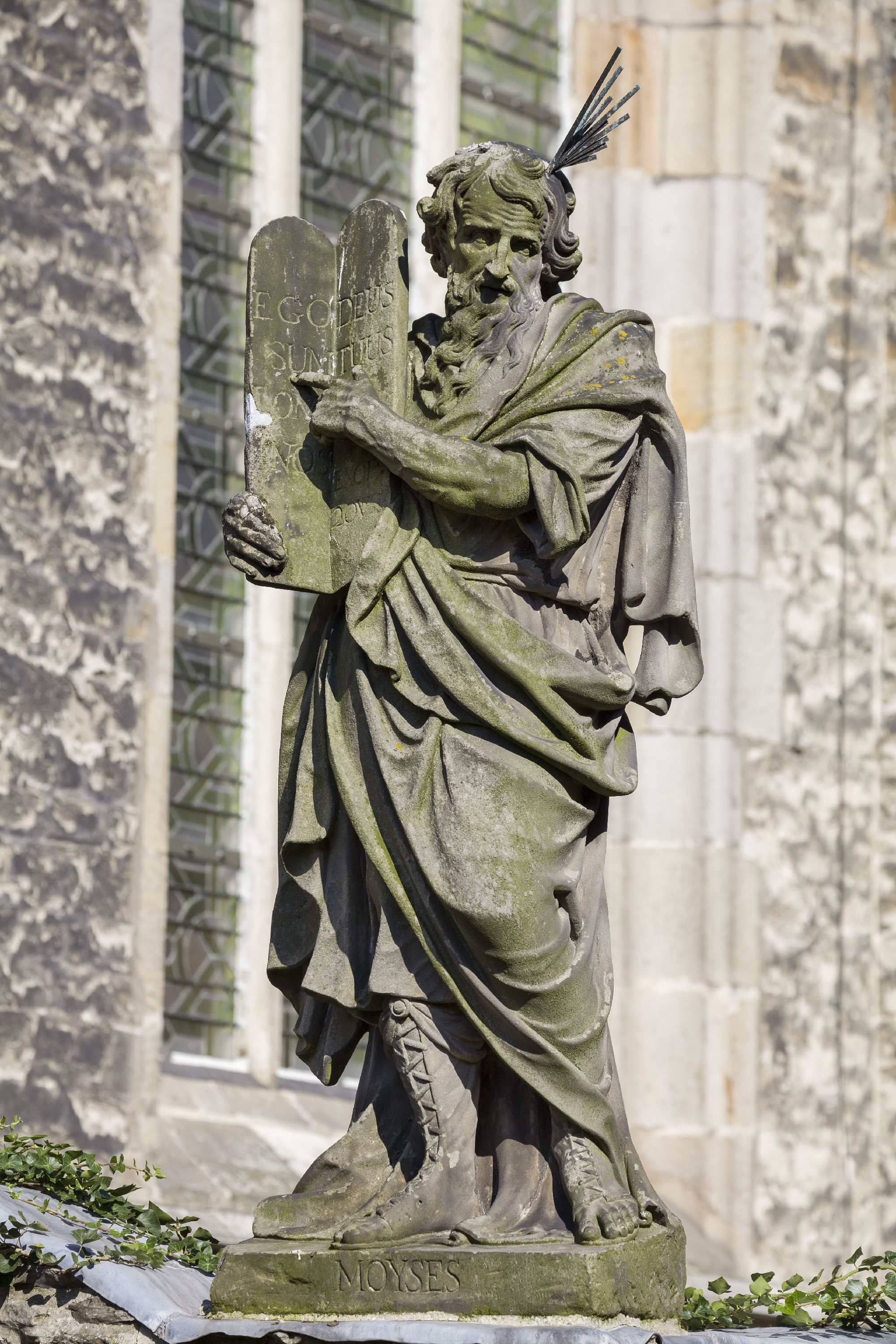
Statue of Moses in the Calvary

Kerricx collaborated with several major sculptors in Antwerp on various projects. In the second half of the 17th century and the early 18th, a few large sculpture workshops in Antwerp came to dominate the market. They were the workshops of the families Quellinus, van den Eynde, Scheemaeckers, Willemsens and Verbrugghen with whom Kerricx' father had also formed an informal partnership. The close links between these Antwerp workshops resulted in a very similar style of late Baroque sculpture, which has made it often difficult to distinguish which artist or workshop produced a particular work.

Kerricx was one of the artists who worked on the creation of a group of statues referred to as the Calvary on the outside of the St. Paul's Church in Antwerp. Its overall design dates from 1697. In 1734 construction of the Calvary was completed but further statues were added up to 1747. It is built as a courtyard and leans on one side against the south aisle of the church and the Chapel of the Holy Sacrament. The structure includes 63 life-size statues and nine reliefs executed in a popular and theatrical style. The statues are arranged into four groups: the angel path, which ascends to the Holy Sepulcher, the garden of the prophets on the left, the garden of the evangelists on the right and the Calvary itself, which consists of an elevated artificial rock, divided into three terraces, on which statues are placed with Christ on the cross at the top. Most statues are of white stone with some made of wood. Some statues are dated or signed. The principal sculptors were Michiel van der Voort the Elder, Alexander van Papenhoven and Jan Claudius de Cock with some statues by the hand of Jan Pieter van Baurscheit de Elder and anonymous collaborators. Kerricx and his father also sculpted a few of the statues. Kerricx sculpted a King David with a lyre and a statue of Moses as well as a Christ in the tomb and a few Stations of the Cross.

=== Paintings ===
Only a few paintings by Kerricx are known. There is a Saint Luke painting the Virgin with the Child Jesus in the Royal Museum of Fine Arts Antwerp. There are also a Moses speaks to his people, Adoration of the lamb and two still life paintings of flowers in Tongerlo Abbey.

=== Architecture ===
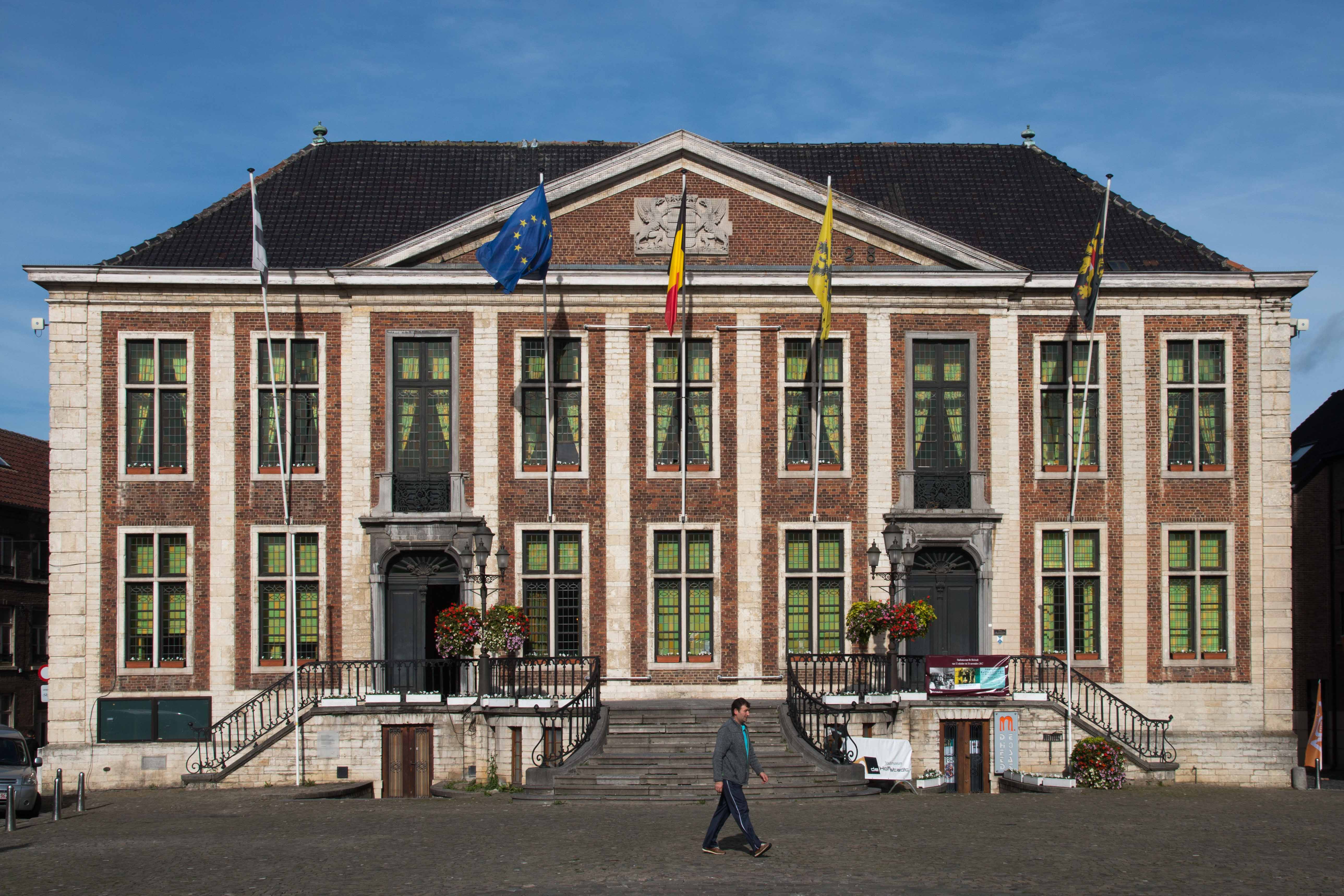
Town hall of Diest

His two most important architectural creations that have survived are the city hall of Diest and the abbot's residence in Tongerlo Abbey. Work on the city hall of Diest began in 1726, structural work was completed in 1728 but final works were only completed in 1731. The former Gothic cellars were used for the substructure. The building with a raised ground and upper floors is built of brick. Executed in a Classical style, it follows the French example with flat colossal pilasters between each bay of the facade. The five central pilasters support a with pediment on which are displayed a coat of arms and the year 1728. The interior design was mostly changed and adapted during the 19th century. The facade was altered in 1948 through the addition of two ostentatious staircases.

The abbot's residence in Tongerlo Abbey was built between 1725 and 1728 after a design by Kerricx. The facade of the building is in Classicist style while the interior decoration and stairs are in a Baroque style. Kerricx also worked on other projects in the abbey. He further provided engineering advice and directed the stabilisation works for the St Walburga Church in Antwerp. He designed new foundations for the church, which was sinking, and a new wooden frame for Rubens' painting of the Raising of the Cross.

=== Plays ===
Kerricx wrote the following plays:

- Het ongestadig wankelrad of den onderdrukten weer herstelden Cambysus, Koning van Persien, tragedy, 1700.
- Don Quichot de la Mansche, farce, 1700.
- De Beschaemden Minnaer of verliefden Droguist, farce, 1702.
- De klucht van den heerschenden Vastenavond, farce, 1703.
- De volbrachte straf in Jerusalems ondergangh, tragedy, 1703.
- Ontwekten krijghslust uyt den slag van Eeckeren, farce, 1703.
- Berouwden krijgslust uyt den slag van Eeckeren, farce, 1704.
- Suffenden min en stinkenden Cupido, farce, 1705.
