= Barbara Ogier =

Flemish playwright

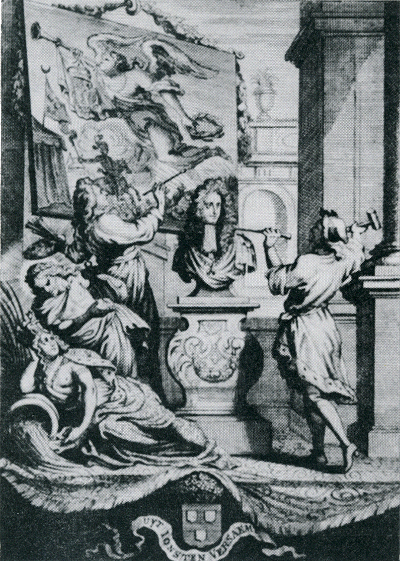
- Frontispiece of Verwellecominghe by Barbara Ogiers, a poem of circumstance, in honor of Maximilian-Emmanuel of Bavaria on the occasion of his visit to Antwerp
- Born: Baptized on 17 February 1648; Antwerp, Spanish Netherlands
- Died: 18 March 1729 (aged 81); Antwerp, Austrian Netherlands
- Occupations: Playwright, poet

Barbara Ogier (baptized 17 February 1648 – 18 March 1720) was a Flemish playwright of De Olijftak, a chamber of rhetoric in Antwerp. Her motto was "Deugd voeght yder" (Virtue is in order).

== Life ==
Barbara Ogier was the daughter of Maria Schoenmaeckers and Willem Ogier. Her father was a playwright and, from 1660, also the factor (principal author) of the De Olijftak (the Olive Branch) chamber of rhetoric. On 10 December 1680 she married the sculptor Willem Kerricx, who became prince of the Olijftak in 1692. Their son Willem Ignatius was born on 22 April 1682. He became a sculptor, painter and architect. He also wrote plays, as had his mother and grandfather, and in 1700 became factor of the Olijftak.

Ogier's Dood van Achilles (The Death of Achilles, 1680) was played before a farce by her father, played on the same day. In the introduction to this play Ogier stresses that women have their own view of history, even on a matter like the siege of Troy. In this case that was reasonable because the motive of the Trojan War was the abduction of a woman, Helen. The play was dedicated to Isabelle de Condé, wife of an Antwerp lawyer.

De Olijftak recognized Ogier's talent, and she was able to represent the chamber during the competition in Bruges in 1700. She also represented De Olijftak on the occasion of great festivities such as the visit to Antwerp in 1693 of the new governor general of the Spanish Netherlands, Maximilian Emanuel of Bavaria. On this occasion, she wrote in two days a short play in which allegorical and mythological characters praise the elector and also describe the sad economic state of Antwerp after the closure of the mouth of the Scheldt. The 360 lines of verse feature the allegorical figures of the Virgin of Antwerp, Apollo, Painting accompanied by three students and Sculpture with two students. The decor for the play was made by the painter Godefridus Maes, while the play was published by Godgaf Verhulst, illustrated with an engraving by Gaspar Bouttats.

== Work ==
=== General ===
Since they had less access to public life than men it was harder for women to print their works. Some opportunities were almost entirely reserved for men, such as chambers of rhetoric, and societies that women could not join. Barbara Ogier was an exception in many respects, since most of the female writers in the southern Netherlands were nuns or beguines who led a religious life in a convent or a women's community. However, the three tragedies she wrote were never printed, and were only partly transmitted. The poems known by her are from anthologies of the De Olijftak chamber.

=== Reception ===
Among those who held Ogier in high esteem during her life was Joseph Lamorlet, her colleague in the chamber of rhetoric, who in his Ontwaekte Poesie through the voice of Apollo called her Sappho, writing verse with no equal. In 1724, in his Parnas, of de zang-godinnen van een schilder, Willem van Swaanenburg published a funeral poem in memory of Barbara Ogier. According to Jan Frans Willems, the quality of her poetry was equal and perhaps superior to that of her father, Willem. She herself apologized for the flaws of her style in the following verses:

Verse in Dutch	Rough translation
Is myn Rymkonst vol ghebreken ? Tis door kortheydt van den tydt : 'K wacht van Konstenaers gheen strydt. Wie sal vrouwen teghenspreken ?	My poetry, is it full of defects? Lack of time is the cause: I do not fear criticism by artists. Who would dare to contradict a woman?

=== List of works ===
Year	Title	Notes
1677	De Getrouwe Panthera	The Faithful Panther; Tragedy presented on 18 October 1677 in honor of Théodore Verbruggen, sculptor, chief dean of the chamber of rhetoric, as a prelude to the play De Traegheydt of her father, Willem Ogier.
1680	De dood van Achilles in het belegerd Troyen	The Death of Achilles in the besieged city of Troy; Tragedy presented on 18 October 1680 in honor of Isabelle de Condé, wife of Guillaume-Philippe de Herzelles; again presented in 1703.
1693	Verwellecominghe op de Saele van Pictura, aen Syne Doorluchtigheydt Maximiliaen Emmanuel	Welcome to the chamber of painting, to His Highness Maximilian-Emmanuel, Duke of Bavaria. 21 February 1693. This is the De Olijftak chamber of rhetoric, linked to the Guild of Saint Luke.
1693	Inhout der Vereenigde Consten met de vertrooste Antverpia	The arts united and Antwerp consoled Shown to His Highness the Prince-elector in the Chamber of Painting, 21 February 1693.
1693	Baucis en Philemon	Baucis and Philemon; Play of welcome on the occasion of the meal of the Dean, Guillielmus Kerrickx, presented on 18 October 18, 1693.
1693	Het verwert Paradys	Paradise disturbed Farce presented on 18 October 1693, again presented in 1700.
1693	Willekom wensch	Welcome in honor of Étienne Cornelisz. Janssens de Huioel, knight, former burgomaster and alderman in office, at his election as chief (Hoofdman) in 1693.
1694	De Dolende Poësis	The Wandering Poetry; Welcome, presented on 26 August 1694 in honor of the new Chief Gregorius Martens.
1694	Zeghenpraelende academie in de openinghe van haeren nieuwen Bouw	The Academy triumphant at the opening of its new building Play dedicated to the magistrate of Antwerp on the occasion of the opening of a new building of the art school, presented on 21 November 1694 in Antwerp.
1699	Den Overwonnen Mars en de triumpherende Peijs	Mars vanquished and Peace victorious. Recited at the reception for Joannes Carolus van Hove, former mayor and alderman of the city of Antwerp, head of the Guild of St. Luke, at the Chamber of the Arts, 25 March 1699.
1700	Den betwisten doodslag in het schuldig gemoet van den Grooten Alexander	Disputed homicide in the guilty conscience of Alexander the Great; Tragedy presented on 19 December 1700.
1709	De Dood van Clytus	The Death of Clytus; Tragedy presented on 19 December 1709 on the King's birthday in the presence of the bishop and the magistrate of Antwerp.
1714	Don Ferdinand oft Spaenschen Sterrekyker	Don Ferdinand, or the Spanish Telescope; Comedy presented at the Chamber of the Arts, known as the Guild of St. Luke, by the amateurs of the Olijftak in Antwerp on 21 October 1714.

== Sources ==
- Aa, A.J. van der (1867), Biographisch woordenboek der Nederlanden (in Dutch), vol. 17, Haarlem: J.J. van Brederode, pp. 55–56
- Angillis, A. Angz (1856), "Barbara Ogier", Rumbeeksche avondstonden (in Dutch), De Vereenigde vrienden, De Brauwer-Stock, pp. 27–41
- Branden, F. Jos. van den (1914), Willem Ogier, tooneeldichter 1618–1689 (in Dutch), Antwerp: V. Resseler
- Frederiks, J.G.; Branden, F. Jos. van den (1888–1891), Biographisch woordenboek der Noord- en Zuidnederlandsche letterkunde (in Dutch), Amsterdam: L.J. Veen, p. 566
- Meeus, Hubert (1995), "Dye vermaerde coopstat van Antwerpen", Colloquium Neerlandicum 12 1994 Nederlands in culturele context (in Dutch), Woubrugge: Internationale Vereniging voor Neerlandistiek, pp. 234–235
- Stecher, J. (1886), Histoire de la littérature néerlandaise en Belgique (in Dutch), Antwerp: J. Sebèque & Cie., p. 257
- Straelen, J.B. van der (1853), "Geschiedenis der Rederykkamer de Violieren of Violettebloem of Violettebloem onder zinspreuk Wt jonsten versaemt te Antwerpen", Het taelverbond: letterkundig tijdschrift (in Dutch), Antwerp: Hendrik Peeters, pp. 300, 309, 315
- Straelen, J.B. van der (1854), Geschiedenis der Antwerpsche rederykkamers. 1: Geschiedenis der Violieren (in Dutch), Antwerp: Peeters, p. 97
- Straelen, J.B. van der (1855), Jaerboek der vermaerde en kunstryke gilde van Sint Lucas binnen de stad Antwerpen behelzende de gedenkweerdigste geschiedenissen in dit genootschap voorgevallen sedert het jaer 1434 tot het jaer 1793 (in Dutch), Antwerp: Peeters-Van Genechten, p. 163
- Swaanenburg, Willem van (1724), Parnas, of de zang-godinnen van een schilder (in Dutch), Amsterdam: Hendrik Bosch, pp. 150–155
- Vieu-Kuik, H.J.; Smeyers, Jos (1975), Geschiedenis van de letterkunde der Nederlanden (in Dutch), vol. 6, Standaard Uitgeverij, Antwerp/Amsterdam, p. 406
- Willems, Jan Frans (1820–1824), Verhandeling over de Nederuytsche tael- en letterkunde (in Dutch), vol. 2, Antwerp: Vve J.S. Schoesetters, p. 148
- Witsen Geysbeek, P.G. (1822), Biographisch anthologisch en critisch woordenboek der Nederduitsche dichters (in Dutch), vol. 4, JAC–NYV, Amsterdam: C.L. Schleijer, pp. 73–74
