= Willem Kerricx =

Flemish sculptor (1652–1719)

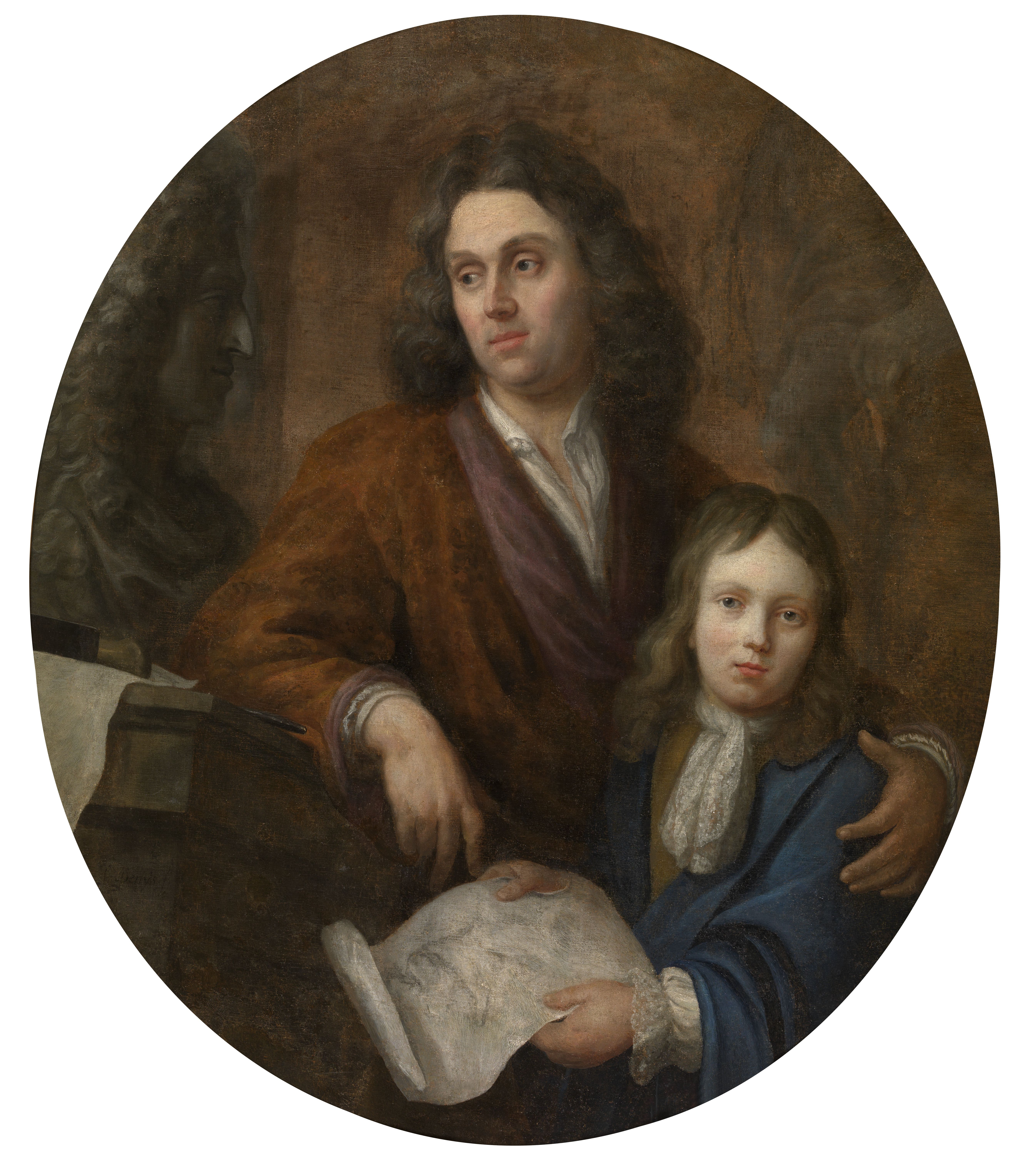
Willem Kerricx and his son Willem Ignatius by Jacob Denys

Willem Kerricx or Willem Kerricx the Elder (2 July 1652, in Dendermonde – 20 June 1719, in Antwerp) was a Flemish sculptor active in Antwerp. His works comprise mostly sculptured church furniture, individual sculptures, both portrait busts as well as statues of saints for churches and funerary monuments. His style shows the transition from the highly dramatic expressiveness of the Antwerp late Baroque towards a more gracious and elegant Rococo style. He operated a large workshop in Antwerp which was continued by his son into the middle of the 18th century.

== Life ==
Kerricx was born in Dendermonde on 2 July 1652. His father, Petrus or Peter, was a brewer who had married Willem's mother Catharina de Bolle in Dendermonde on 18 January 1648. His grandfather, also called Willem, was a sculptor as was his uncle Jan Kerricx. He was registered as an apprentice sculptor in the records of the Antwerp Guild of Saint Luke in the guild year 1660–1661, when he was barely 8 years old. His master was the obscure sculptor Jan Baptist Buys. Some sources also mention Artus Quellinus the Younger as a master of Kerricx. Quellinus was an Antwerp sculptor who played an important role in the evolution of Northern-European sculpture from High Baroque to Late Baroque.

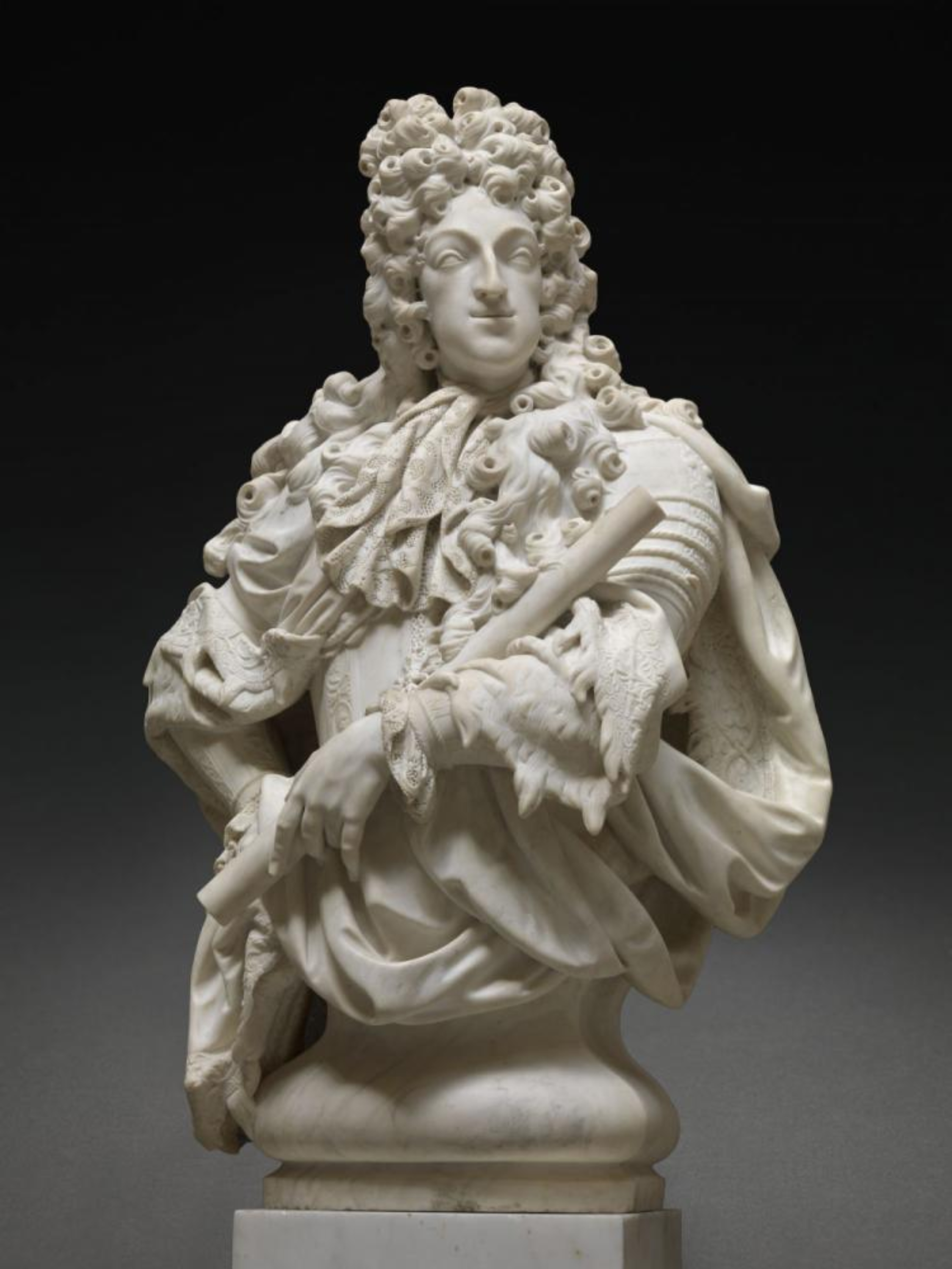
Bust of Maximilian II Emanuel

He was registered as a master at the Antwerp guild in the guild year 1674–1675. He then spent the next three years furthering his training in Paris before returning to Antwerp. He returned to Antwerp in 1678 and joined the same year the chamber of rhetoric de Olijftak as a 'liefhebber' (enthusiast or fan). The chamber of rhetoric organised the staging of plays and other performances. He married Barbara Ogier in Antwerp on 10 December 1680. His wife was a poet and playwright whose father was the Antwerp playwright Willem Ogier. She was active in de Olijftak as a playwright and that is how she and Kerricx met. From their marriage three children were born: Willem Ignatius Kerricx who became a sculptor, painter and writer and took over the family business from his father, Catharina Clara who became a painter and aquarellist and Anna Maria.

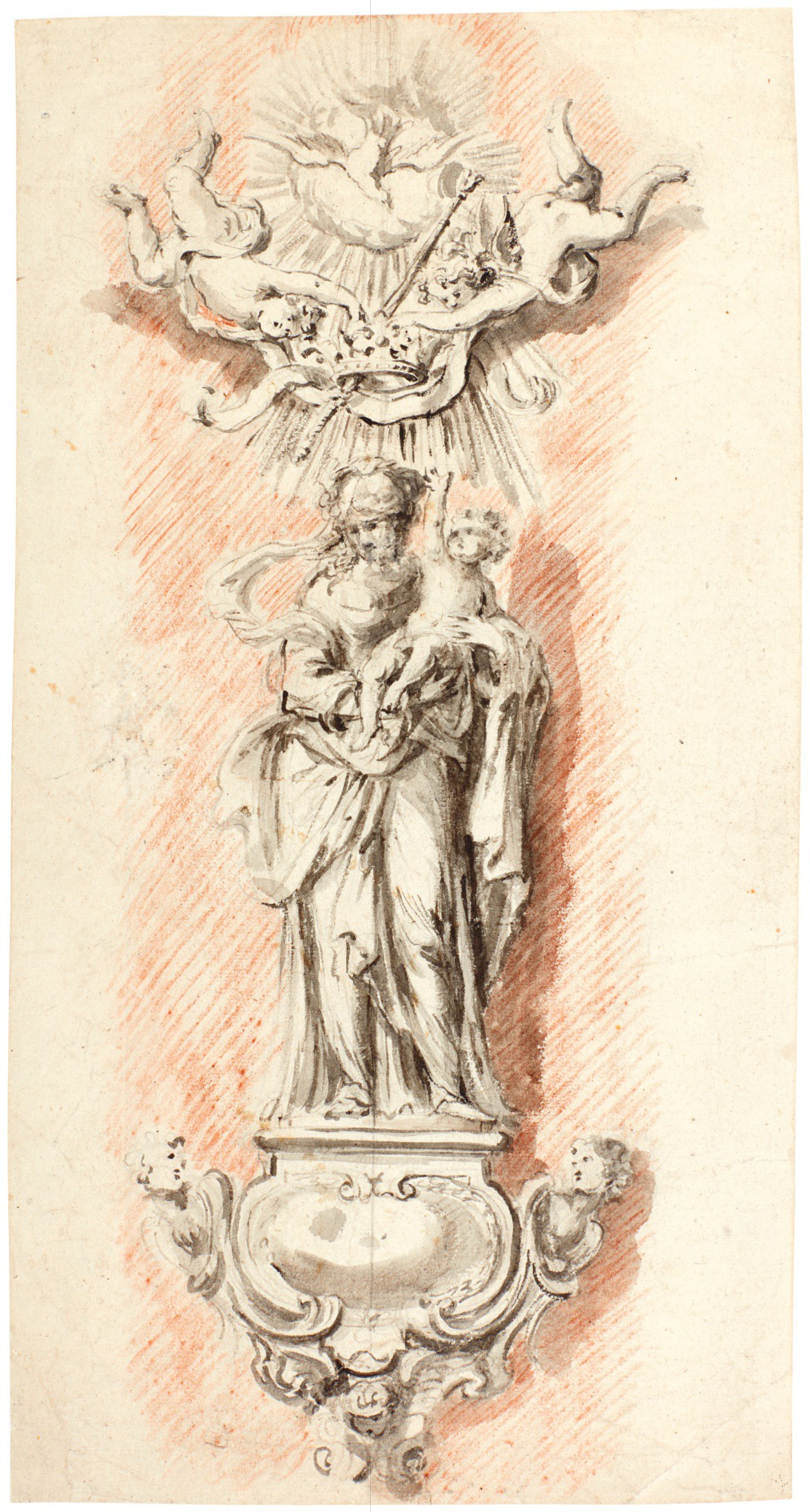
Study for a pillar statue of the Virgin and child crowned by angels

He was a member of the 'sodaliteit der getrouwden', a fraternity for married men established by the Jesuit order. He was elected the 'consultor' of the sodaliteit in 1682, 1715 and 1719. In 1693 he became the deacon of the Guild of Saint Luke. On 21 February 1693 his wife's play was performed by de Olijftak in the presence of Maximilian II Emanuel, Elector of Bavaria, on the occasion of his Joyous Entry as the new governor of the Spanish Netherlands into Antwerp on 18 February. On 3 March Kerricx, in his function of deacon of the Guild, received the new governor in the grand chamber of the Guild of Saint Luke. The next year he was commissioned by the Guild to make a bust of the governor as a token of gratitude for the four new privileges which Maximilian II Emanuel had granted the Antwerp academy in 1693. The proceeds from the privileges were used towards the construction of a building for the Antwerp Academy. The bust was placed in the Guild's large meeting room in 1694. It is possibly he resided abroad, possibly in England, between 1701 and 1710 as there were no registrations of pupils during this period.

Willem Kerricx operated a busy workshop in Antwerp. To assist in the work he would also employ apprentices. He had a very large number of apprentices over his career. Assuming that they all served for four years, he employed on average about 2.5 apprentices at any time. The more prominent of his apprentices are his son, Petrus Jacobus Galliard and Cornelius Struyf.

He died in Antwerp on 20 June 1719. He was buried in the Church of the Dominicans. His widow was buried with him the next year and their son in 1745.

== Work ==
He created mostly sculptured church furniture, individual sculptures, both portrait busts as well as statues of saints for churches and funerary monuments. He worked in many materials including wood, marble and terracotta. The terracotta works were typically studies for larger works to be executed in marble or wood. He produced mainly for the churches of Antwerp. Among these works stand out the marble pillar throne dated 1688 in the St. Paul's Church, Antwerp which includes two marble reliefs telling the story of a woman who sold her soul to the devil but was saved through the force of the prayer of the rosary.

He collaborated with Hendrik Frans Verbrugghen on a marble communion bench (marble, 1695) in the St. James' Church, Antwerp. In 1711 he carved four confessionals for the Grimbergen Abbey near Brussels. These confessionals have also been attributed to Hendrik Frans Verbrugghen. He also made the funerary monuments for two abbots in the Saint Gertrude church in Leuven (partially destroyed at the end of World War Two).

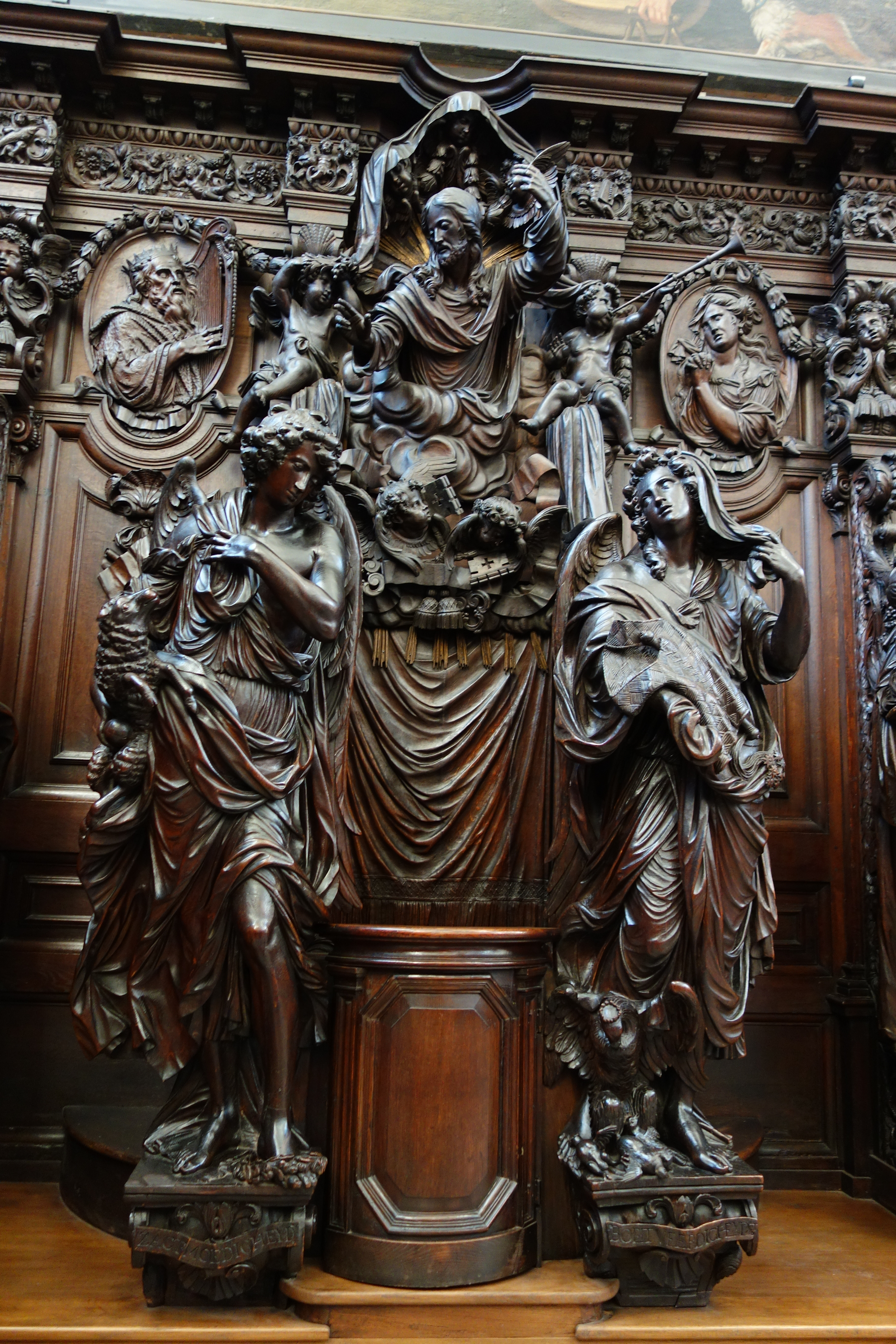
Confessional representing the Last Judgement, St. Paul's Church, Antwerp

His style shows the transition from the highly dramatic expressiveness of the Antwerp late Baroque towards a more gracious and elegant Rococo style. This is demonstrated in his best known work, the bust of Maximilian II Emanuel, Elector of Bavaria, the Governor of the Habsburg Netherlands (Royal Museum of Fine Arts Antwerp). The work is qualitatively on the same level as the Italian and French court portraits of the late Baroque period.

Kerricx collaborated with several major sculptors in Antwerp, where he resided for most of his life. In the second half of the 17th century a few large sculpture workshops in Antwerp came to dominate the market. They were the workshops of the families Quellinus, van den Eynde, Scheemaeckers, Willemsens and Verbrugghen with whom Kerricx also formed an informal partnership. The close links between these Antwerp workshops resulted in a very similar style of late Baroque sculpture, which has made it often difficult to distinguish which artist or workshop produced a particular work.
