= Theodoor Boeyermans =

Flemish painter (1620–1678)

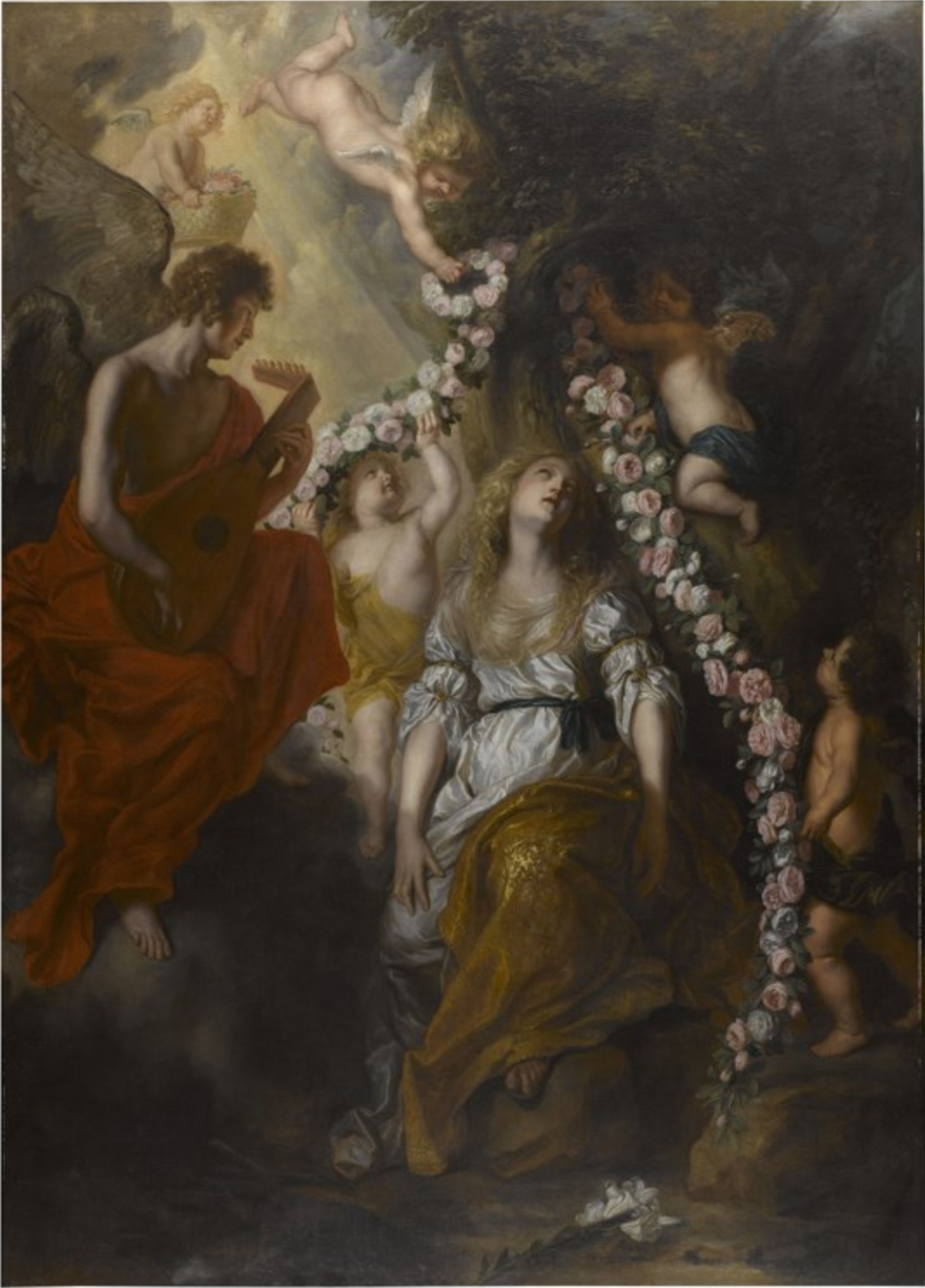
The ecstasy of Saint Rosalia of Palermo

Theodoor Boeyermans, Theodor Boeyermans or Theodor Boeijermans (10 November 1620 – January 1678) was a Flemish painter active in Antwerp who painted Baroque history paintings and group portraits informed by the tradition of Peter Paul Rubens and Anthony van Dyck.

== Life ==
Theodoor Boeyermans was born in Antwerp as the son of Jan Boeyermans, Dirkszoon, originally from Haarlem who was a long-time resident of Antwerp and Agneta Leermans, a native of Antwerp. His mother was a widow who brought nine children from her first marriage into the family. The father of Boeyermans died in 1624. Boeyermans received his initial education in Antwerp. In 1634 his mother obtained a safe conduct allowing her family to stay in Eindhoven in the Dutch Republic. Here Boeyermans probably obtained a master's degree. He returned a few times to Antwerp to study and deal with several matters, including the receipt of his inheritance upon becoming an adult. From 1649 onwards he settled back in his native city where he lived in the house in which he was born and which was called 'De Gulden Pers' (The Golden Press).

It is not clear with whom he trained as a painter. Some historians have suggested a training in van Dyck's studio in Antwerp. He may also have made a trip to Italy. He became a master of the Antwerp guild of St. Luke in 1654 when he was already 34 years old.

He remained a bachelor his entire life. He joined the Sodaliteit der Bejaarde Jongmans, a fraternity for elderly bachelors established by the Jesuit order. He was also a member of the Antwerp chamber of rhetoric de Olyftack (Olive Branch) from 1664. He collaborated with Dirck van Delen, a Dutch member of 'de Olyftack', on a large painting entitled Allegory of the Arts which they donated to the chamber of rhetoric in 1666.

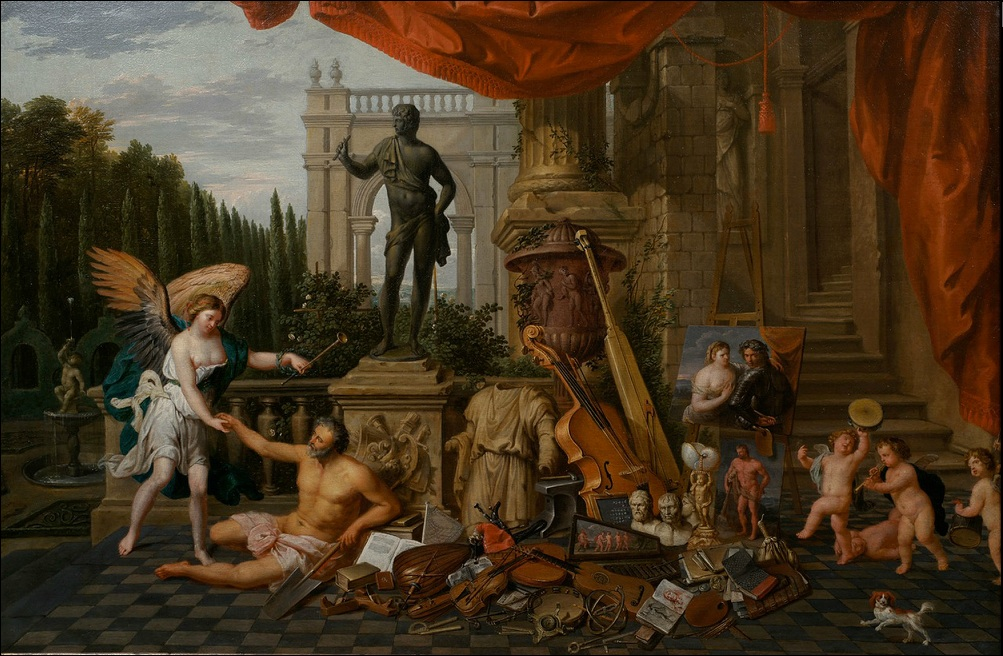
Allegory of the City of Antwerp

Marcus Forchondt, son of the art dealer Guillam Forchondt the Elder, was Boeyermans's pupil in 1670. Marcus later moved to Vienna to represent the family business but he remained in contact with Boeyermans as is testified by a letter dated September 1677.

Boeyermans died in Antwerp in January 1678.

== Work ==
Boeyermans' dated works are dated between 1660 and 1677. He was mainly a painter of history and allegorical paintings. The artist received many important commissions for churches in his native Antwerp, the Kempen region and in Malines, but made his name in his hometown by painting secular compositions. He also painted group portraits. Together with Jan-Erasmus Quellinus, Boeyermans was one of the last important 17th-century Flemish history painters.

His style was influenced by Rubens and van Dyck but he favoured a darker palette than those two artists. Even as a more expressive style was developing in Antwerp, Boeyermans retained a classicist approach in his work. At the same time he championed the more emotional style of van Dyck. His compositions show his sense of balance and repose and his facial types often represent a refined ideal of beauty.

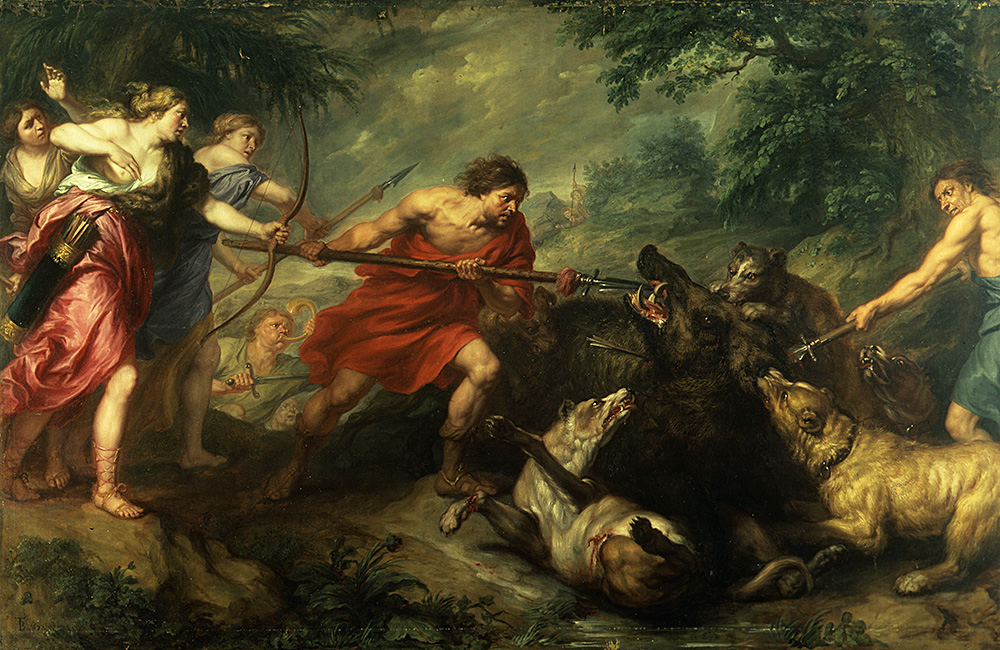
The Caledonian boar hunt

One of his allegorical paintings called Antwerp, Nourishing the Painters (1665, Royal Museum of Fine Arts, Antwerp) is a tribute to the artistic history of Antwerp and was executed for the meeting hall of the Antwerp Academy, which had been founded shortly before in 1663 at the initiative of David Teniers the Younger. The painting was intended as ceiling decoration of the meeting hall of the academy for which Jacob Jordaens also donated two other ceiling paintings. Boeyermans' allegorical painting celebrates Anwerp's glorious artistic past. This past is represented by means of the portraits of Peter Paul Rubens and Anthony van Dyck, who watch over young students practising the arts. In the center is an allegorical female figure who represents the city of Antwerp and was according to some a portrait of van Dyck's wife Mary Ruthven. Chronos (Time) accompanies young students who present their artwork, while the river god Scaldis (a symbol of Antwerp's river Scheldt) with his cornucopia, symbolizes the wealth and bounty of the city's artistic heritage. A bust of Homer emphasizes the close link between Pictura (painting) and Poesis (poetry). In the 1660s Boeyermans produced another allegorical painting of Antwerp referred to as Allegory of the City of Antwerp (private collection).

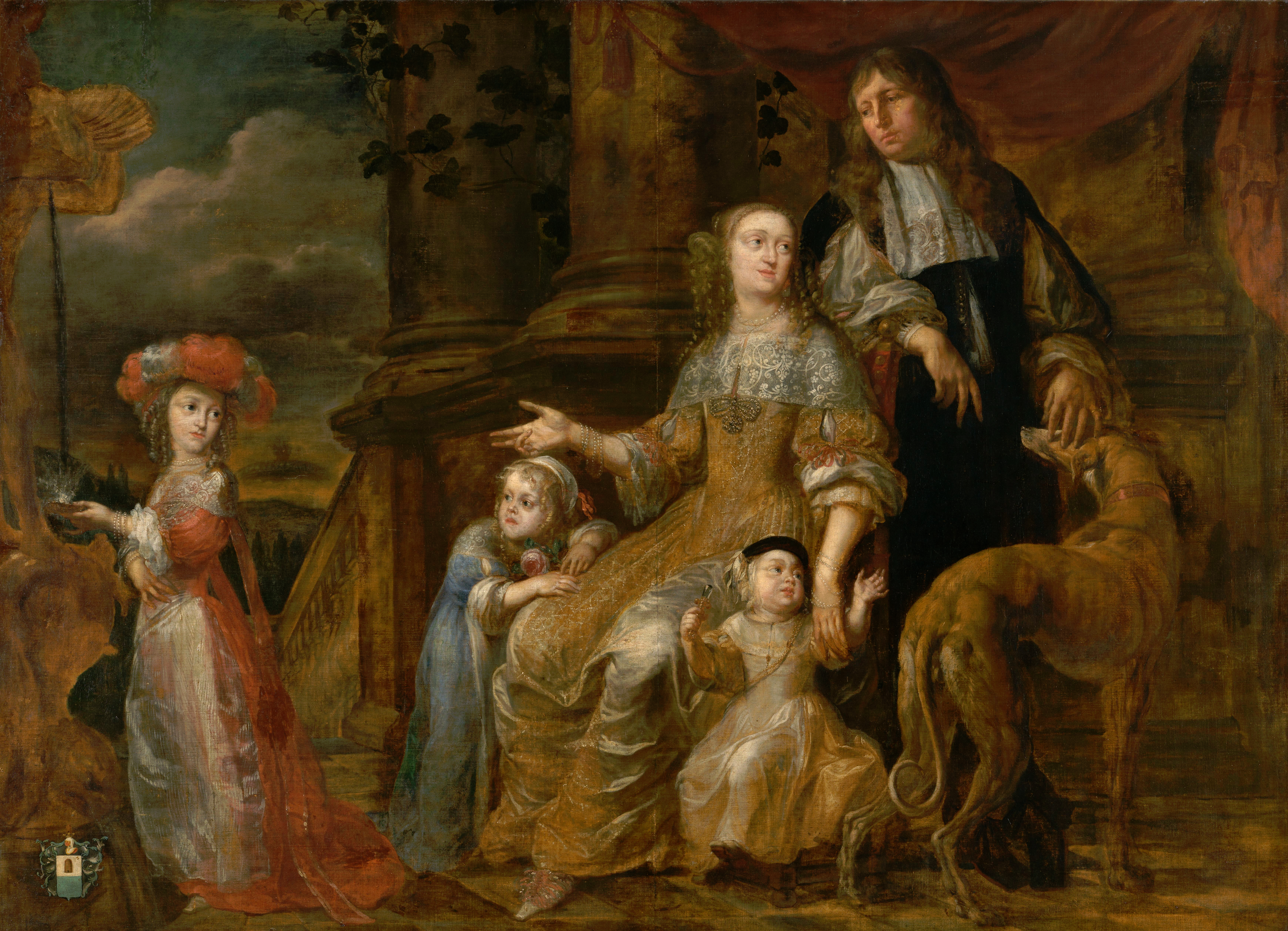
Portrait of the de Bie family

One of his last works represents The Hunt of the Calydonian Boar (1677, Musée de la chasse et de la nature, Paris) and is inspired by Rubens' treatment of the same subject (Kunsthistorisches Museum). The scene depicted centers on the killing of the boar by the hunters and hounds. While clearly inspired by Rubens, Boeyermans' originality is manifested in his simpler and more intense treatment compared to Rubens' violent whirlwind of people and animals. Boeyermans used in his composition a free and delicate technique but tightened his brush stroke in the details that contribute most to the understanding of the scene, i.e. in the faces of the hunters.

In his portraits, the refined treatment of his subjects shows the influence of van Dyck's portraits. An example is the family portrait of the de Bie family (Royal Museum of Fine Arts, Antwerp), which depicts the well-to-do de Bie family of Antwerp amidst the usual symbols of fidelity (the dog), fortitude (the columns), fertility (the vines) and love (the fire).

== Selected works ==
- Antwerp, Nourishing the Painters, Royal Museum of Fine Arts, Antwerp, 1665
- The Envoy, Royal Museum of Fine Arts, Antwerp
- Saint Charles Borromeo Nursing the Plague Victims, Museum of Fine Arts Ghent, 1669
- Portrait of the Family de Bie, Royal Museum of Fine Arts, Antwerp
- The Visit, Royal Museum of Fine Arts, Antwerp
- The Vision of Saint Mary Magdalene of Pazzi, Royal Museum of Fine Arts, Antwerp, 1669
- Christ Healing the Sick People Lying near the Pool of Bethesda, Royal Museum of Fine Arts, Antwerp, 1675
