= Stephanus Axters =

Stephanus Gerardus Axters (1901–1977) was a Belgian scholar with a particular interest in the history and literature of Christian mysticism.

== Life ==
Axters was born in Bruges, West Flanders (Belgium) on 15 October 1901. He joined the Order of Preachers at the age of 20, in 1921, and studied in Rome. After early work on Thomas Aquinas and Catherine of Siena, he became an expert on the history of Flemish mysticism, publishing a four-volume history and numerous articles on the subject, as well as founding the periodical Tijdschrift voor Geestelijk Leven (1945).

On 30 November 1957, he became a member of the Royal Academy of Dutch Language and Literature.

== Works ==
A bibliography of his writings was published in 1971 to mark his 70th birthday. It enumerates 286 items. His most important works are:

- Scholastiek Lexicon, Latijn-Nederlandsch (1937)
- Het Nederlandsche mystieke proza (1944)
- De Nederlandsche mystieke poëzie (1946)
- Geschiedenis van de vroomheid in de Nederlanden (4 vols., 1950–1960)
- Inkeer (1967)
- Inleiding tot een geschiedenis van de mystiek in de Nederlanden (1967)
- Bibliotheca Dominicana Neerlandica manuscripta 1224-1500 (1970)
- "Waartoe mystiek?", Verslagen en mededelingen van de Koninklijke Academie voor Nederlandse taal- en letterkunde (1972), pp. 132-138.
