= Willem van Nieulandt II =

Flemish painter, printmaker, playwright and poet

Guilliam van Nieulandt II
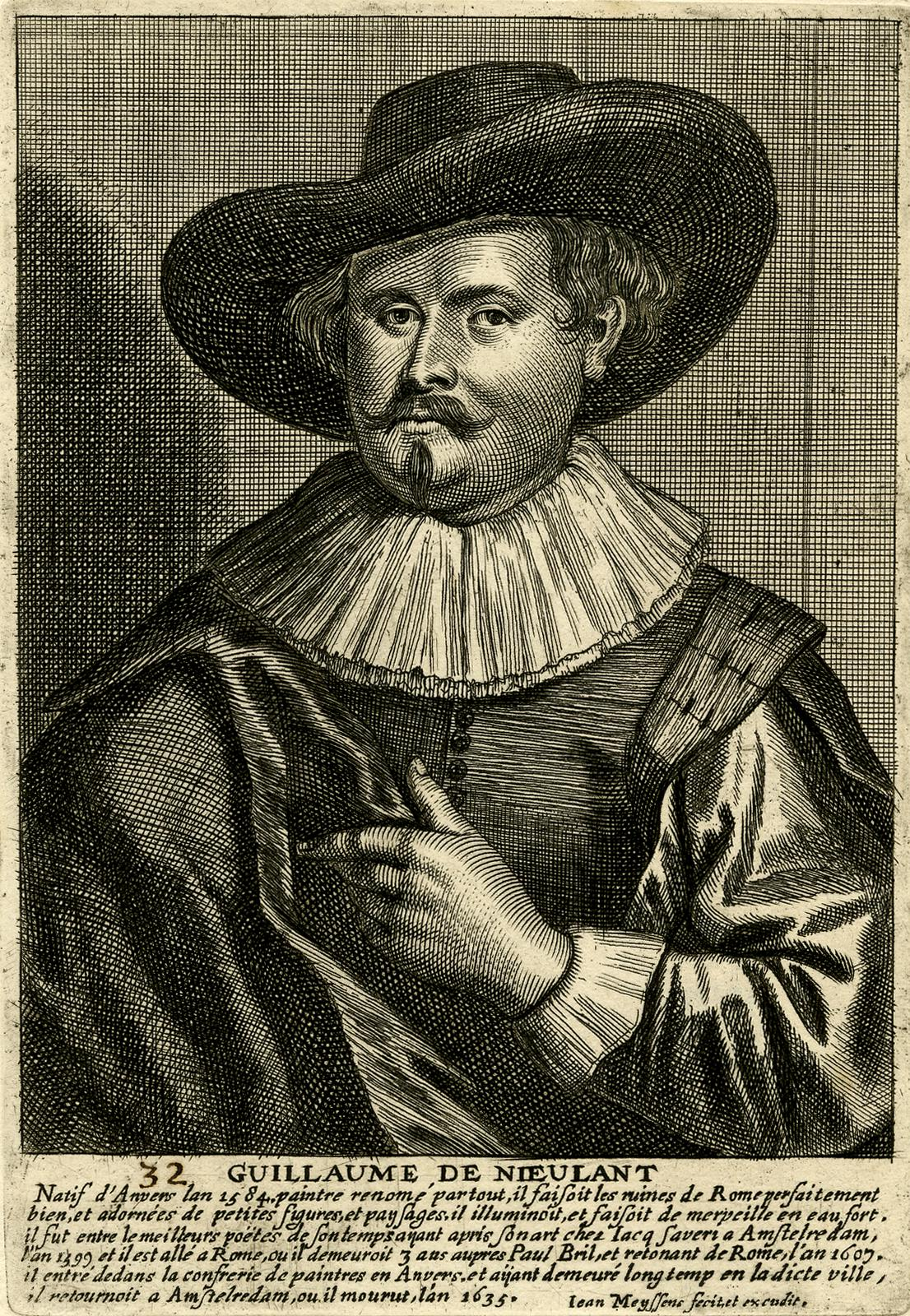
- Guilliam van Nieulandt in Cornelis de Bie's Het Gulden Cabinet.
- Born: Guilliam van Nieulandt; 1584; Antwerp
- Died: 1635 (aged 50–51); Amsterdam
- Known for: Painting, poetry, stage plays
- Movement: Baroque

Guilliam or Willem van Nieulandt or van Nieuwelandt (1582/84–1635) was a Flemish painter, engraver, poet and playwright from Antwerp. He spent two thirds of his career in the Habsburg Netherlands and the remainder in Italy and the Dutch Republic. He is known for his Italianate landscape paintings and prints, often real views or capricci of landscapes and buildings from in or around Rome enlivened by contemporary figures or biblical or mythological scenes. He is regarded as the principal poet and playwright active in the Habsburg Netherlands in the first three decades of the 17th century.

== Biography ==
He was born in Antwerp in 1582 or 1584 as the son of Adriaen van Nieulandt the elder (died 1603) and Geertruyd Loyson (died ca. 1627). His father was a merchant dealing in quills as was his grandfather who was also admitted as a master of the Guild of Saint Luke of Antwerp in 1573. His family included a number of artists such as his uncle Guilliam or Willem van Nieulandt (I) who was a painter and draftsperson. His younger brother Adriaen van Nieulandt the younger (born in 1586 in Antwerp) became a decorative painter of interiors, print artist, art dealer, appraiser, painter and draftsperson and was mainly active in Amsterdam. The van Nielandt family moved to Amsterdam in 1589, after the Fall of Antwerp, possibly because they were Protestants or simply for economic reasons as Antwerp was suffering the effects of the ongoing war with Holland. Another brother called Jacob van Nieulandt was born in 1593/94 in Amsterdam where he became an art dealer, painter, innkeeper and draftsperson. Father van Nieulandt became a poorter of Amsterdam in 1594, which shows that he was of good means.

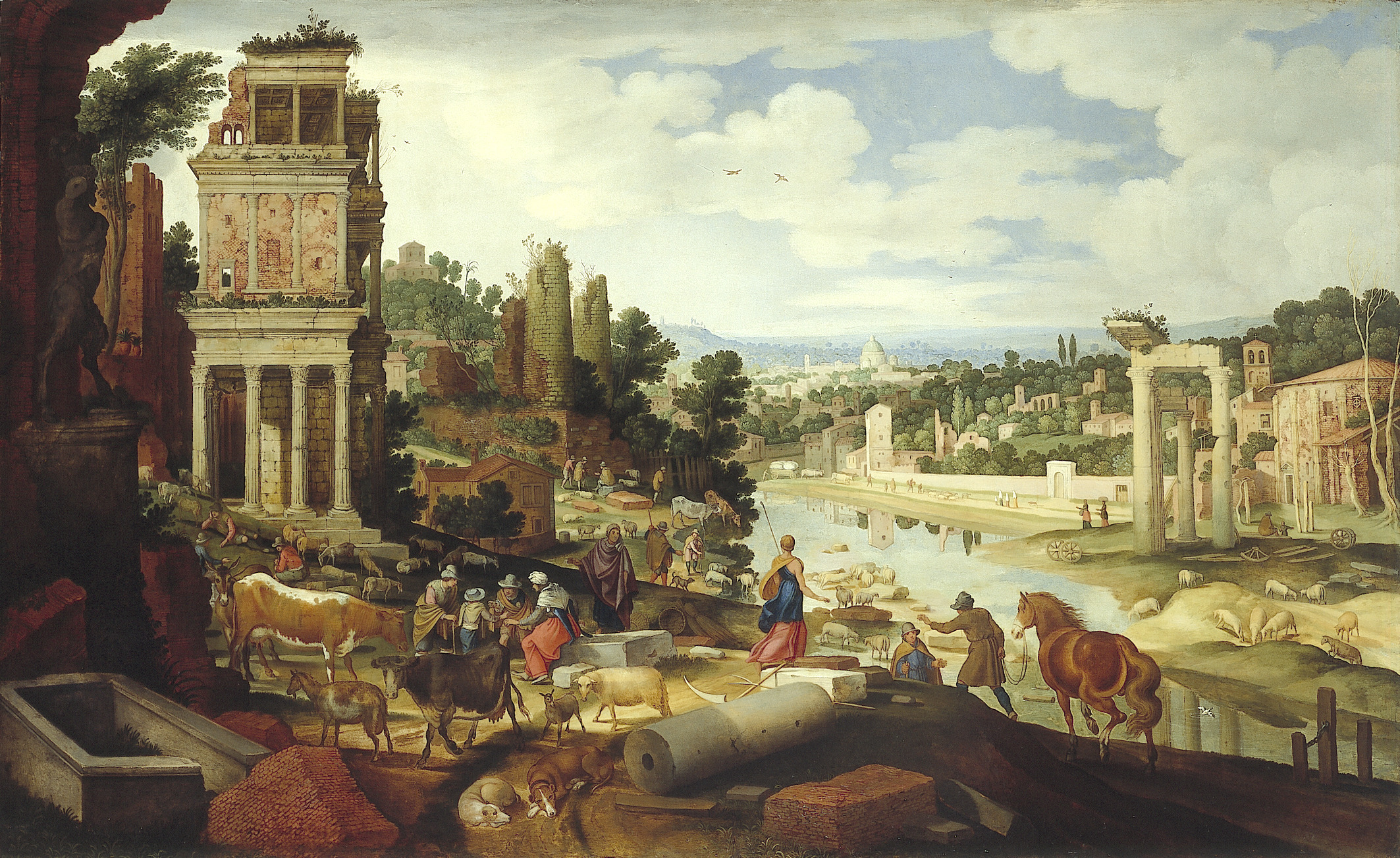
Roman capriccio with the Septizodium, the Tomb of Porsenna and the Temple of Vesta

According to the early biographer Arnold Houbraken, Willem became in 1599 a pupil of Roelant Savery, another Flemish émigré living in Amsterdam known for his landscapes, still lifes and animal paintings. Contemporary art historians have argued that he was not the pupil of Roelant Savery, but of his brother Jacob Savery, an artist specialised in still lifes, animals, landscapes en genre paintings. In 1601 he travelled to Rome, where he worked from 1601 to 1603 in the workshop of his uncle Guilliam van Nieulandt I and later in the workshop of Paul Bril, a prominent Flemish landscape painter. In the years 1602 and 1603 he lived with his uncle Guilliam van Nieulandt I in the Via Paulina, now Via del Babuino, in the same house where the Antwerp painter Abraham Janssens was also living. According to Arnold Houbraken, he specialized in Rome in painting artistic ruins of monuments, arches, and temples, many of which he then engraved himself.

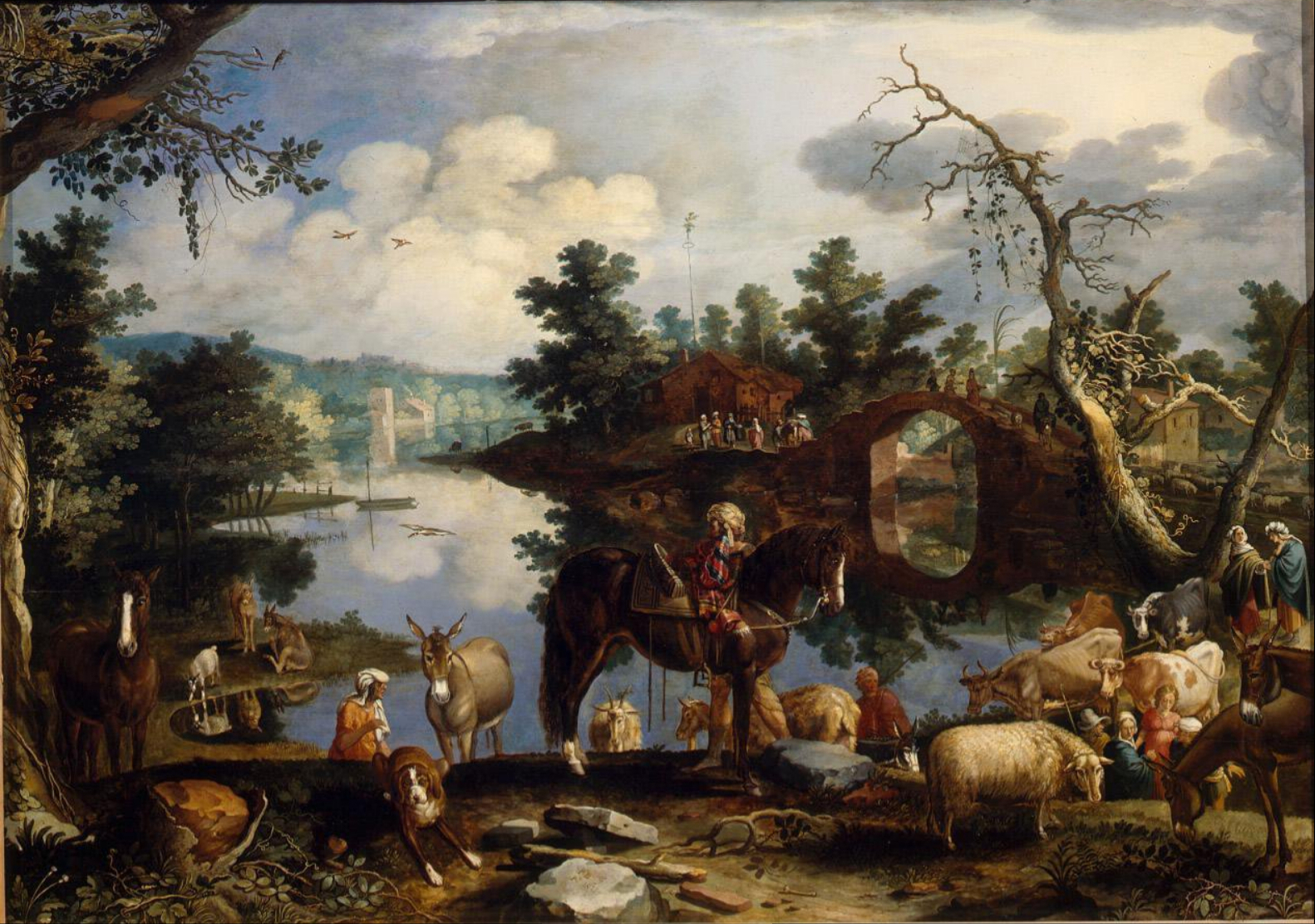
Jacob Returning to Canaan

He returned to the Low Countries in 1604 first residing in Amsterdam. On 11 February 1606 the 22-year-old Willem married in Amsterdam Anna Hustaert (or Huystaert) who was a native of Antwerp but had grown up in Amsterdam. Willem had ostensibly returned to the Roman Catholic faith during his Roman sojourn, but the bans for his marriage in Amsterdam were published in the Reformed Church, casting some doubt on the sincerity of his conversion. The couple settled in Antwerp. In the guild year 1605-1606 he was admitted as a master painter in the Guild of Saint Luke of Antwerp as the son of a master. He took in the same year an apprentice by the name of Peerken Hermans. On 13 April 1606 he became a citizen of Antwerp. His son Adriaen was born in 1607. On 26 February 1611 his daughter Constancia or Constantia was baptized in the church which is now Antwerp Cathedral. She later married the still life painter Adriaen van Utrecht and was a well regarded poet and still life painter.

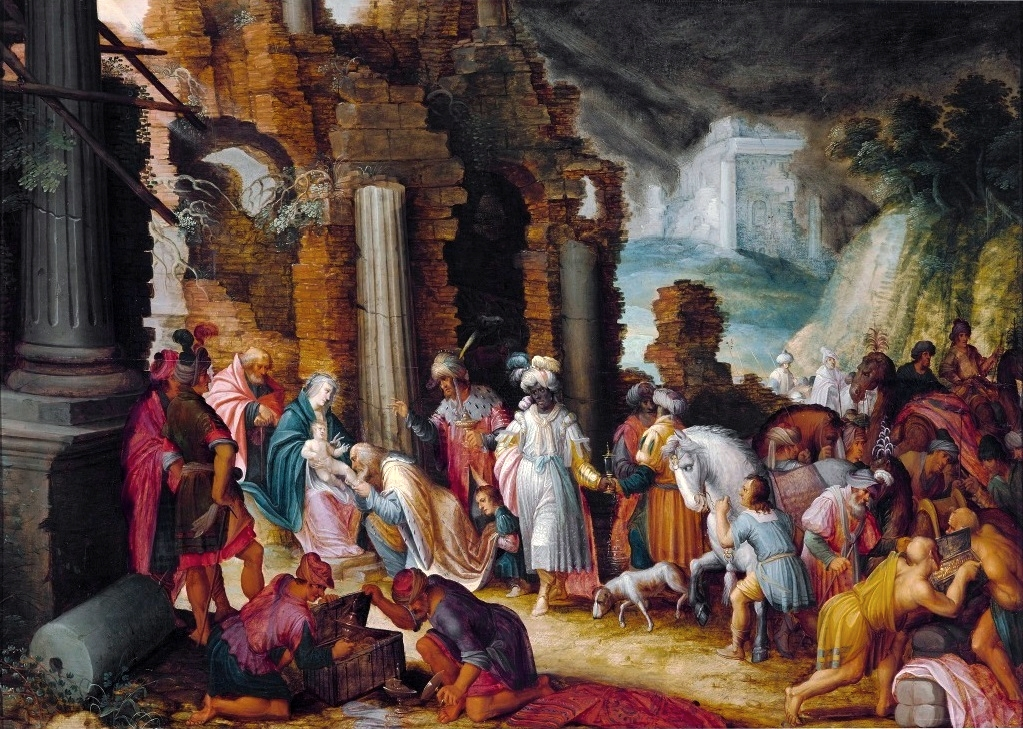
Adoration of the Magi

The violence of the Eighty Years' War had caused the decline of Antwerp's chambers of rhetoric (rederijkerskamers) which staged theatre plays in the city. The Twelve Years' Truce, which established a temporary reprieve from the Eighty Years' War from 1609 to 1621, allowed for their revival. It is likely that the Antwerp chamber of rhetoric Olyftack (Olive Branch) commissioned Willem van Nieulandt to assist with the restoration of their meeting room and performance area. It paid him for a painting of the Virgin Mary and the renewal of its blazon. By the winter of 1615, he had finished his restoration work. On 25 September of the same year, together with Joan David Heemsen, he took the oath as an elder (hoofdman) of the resurrected chamber of rhetoric, and in November the performances of two of his tragedies, Livia, already completed in March 1614, and Saul, written shortly afterwards, began. He was very successful with these plays which helped revive the Antwerp theatre scene.

On 22 May 1629 he witnessed in Antwerp the baptism of the first child of his daughter Constantia. At some unknown time after this date he returned to Amsterdam where he published his final tragedy in 1635, which he had written in the two years before he left Antwerp. He executed a will on 24 October 1635 while he was sick in bed in his home in Amsterdam. He signed the will with ' Giu. v. Nieulandt'. Shortly thereafter he died.

== Artworks ==
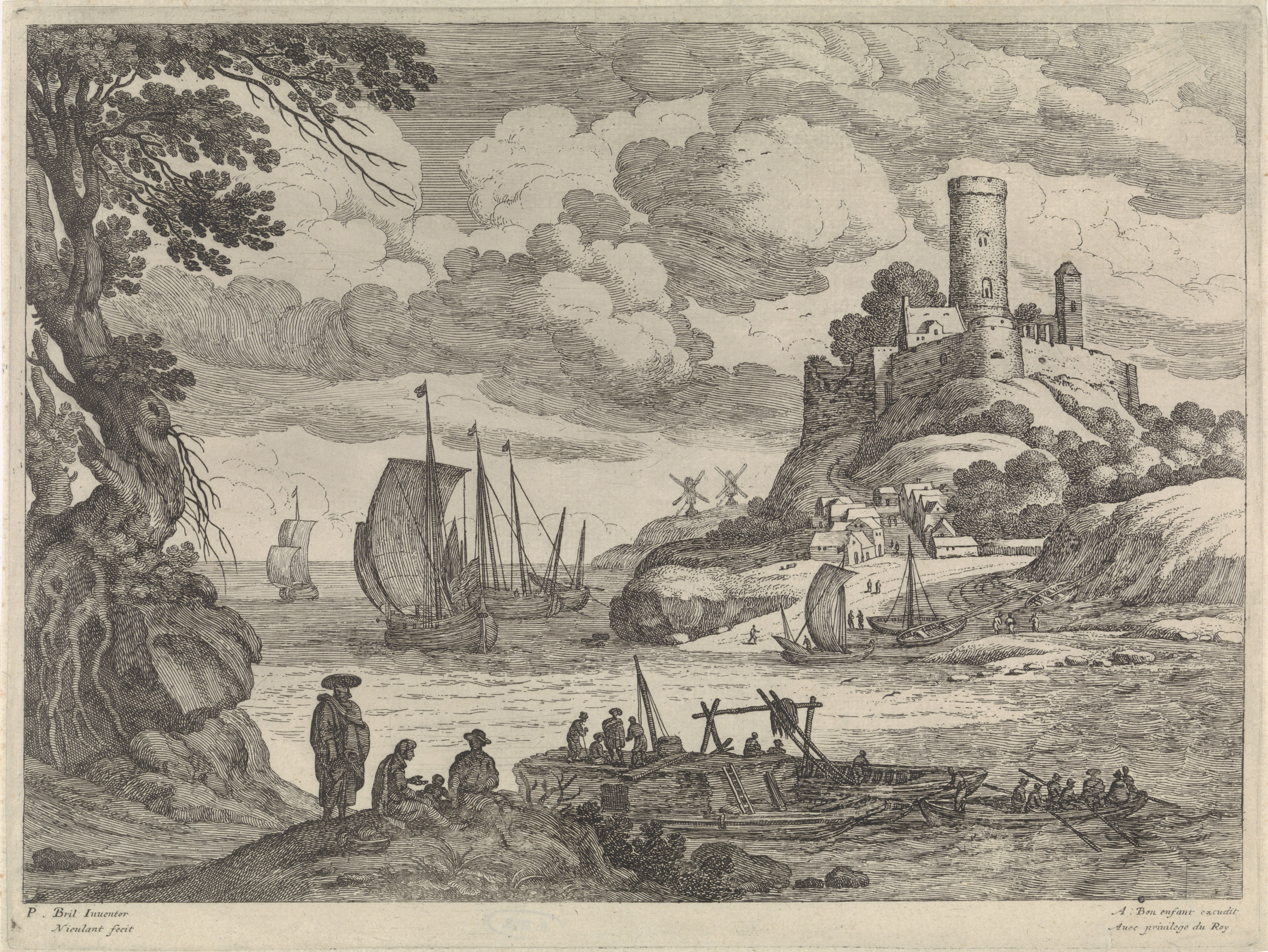
View of a port with ships engraved by van Nieulandt after design by Paul Bril

He created landscape paintings of views in and around Rome, most of them capricci of Roman buildings and ruins, often including a biblical or mythological scene or shepherds and travellers. He had made many sketches of Rome and its surroundings which he used during the rest of his career as backdrops for his paintings and prints. While his drawings were detailed and topographically accurate, his paintings usually consisted of fanciful capricci of Rome's architectural heritage often placing familiar monuments next to invented structures in imaginary landscapes.

He was a prolific printmaker who created many etchings of Roman ruins and Italian landscapes that were published in Antwerp under his supervision. Some of them were carved after drawings of the brothers Matthijs Bril and Paul Bril, Sebastiaen Vrancx and his own drawings. One series of 10 etchings of Roman ruins were copied and published by Claes Jansz. Visscher in Amsterdam. Jan van de Velde and Cornelis Danckert also reproduced some of his etchings in Amsterdam. This helped spread his work in the Dutch Republic.

== Literary oeuvre ==
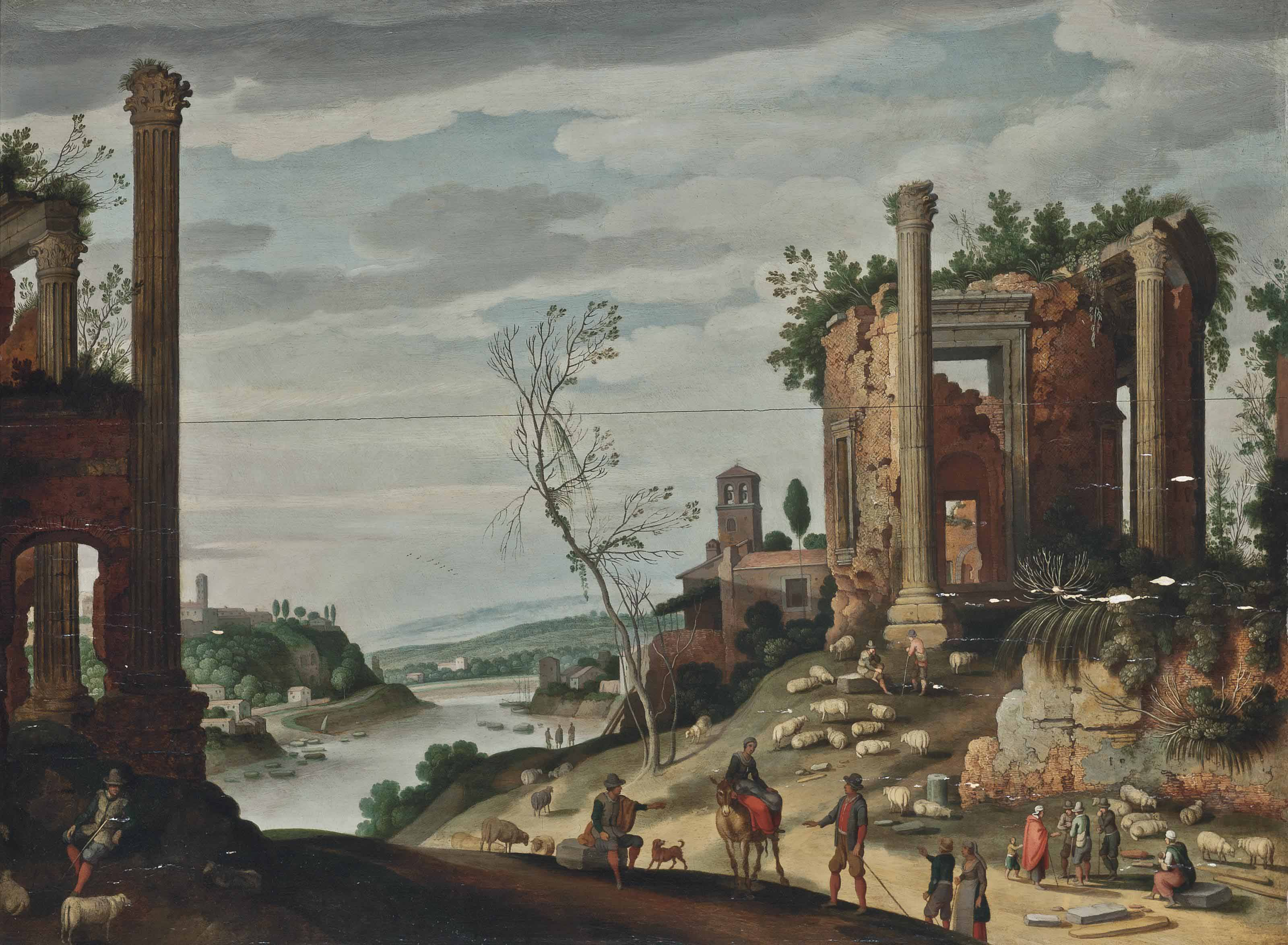
River landscape with classical ruins, shepherds and shepherdesses and their flock

Van Nieulandt was better known as a poet and playwright than as a painter. He was a member of the Antwerp chamber of rhetoric the Olyftack (Olive Branch) from 1613 to 1621, transferring to the rival Violieren from 1621 to 1629. His tragedies followed the classical type of tragedies introduced by the Ancient dramatist Seneca and were imbued with the neo-stoic moralist principles which were then very popular among Antwerp's humanist elites. The action in the tragedies was dominated by extreme scenes of horror, including gruesome murders and mutilations. The protagonists were constantly driven by extreme emotions.

In May 1620 he won the prize for best poem at a rhetoric competition in Mechelen, writing under the pen name Dient uwen Al (Serve your All). In May 1624 the Violieren produced his play Aegyptica (a tragedy on the theme of Anthony and Cleopatra).

== Literary works ==
Van Nieulandt was better known as a poet and playwright than as a painter. He was a member of the Antwerp chamber of rhetoric the Olyftack (Olive Branch) from 1613 to 1621, transferring to the rival Violieren from 1621 to 1629. His tragedies followed the classical type of tragedies introduced by the Ancient dramatist Seneca and were imbued with neo-stoic moralism. The tragedies were driven by extreme scenes of horror, including gruesome murders and mutilations. The protagonists were constantly affected by extreme emotions.

In May 1620 he won the prize for best poem at a rhetoric competition in Mechelen, writing under the pen name Dient uwen Al (Serve your All). In May 1624 the Violieren produced his play Aegyptica (a tragedy on the theme of Anthony and Cleopatra).

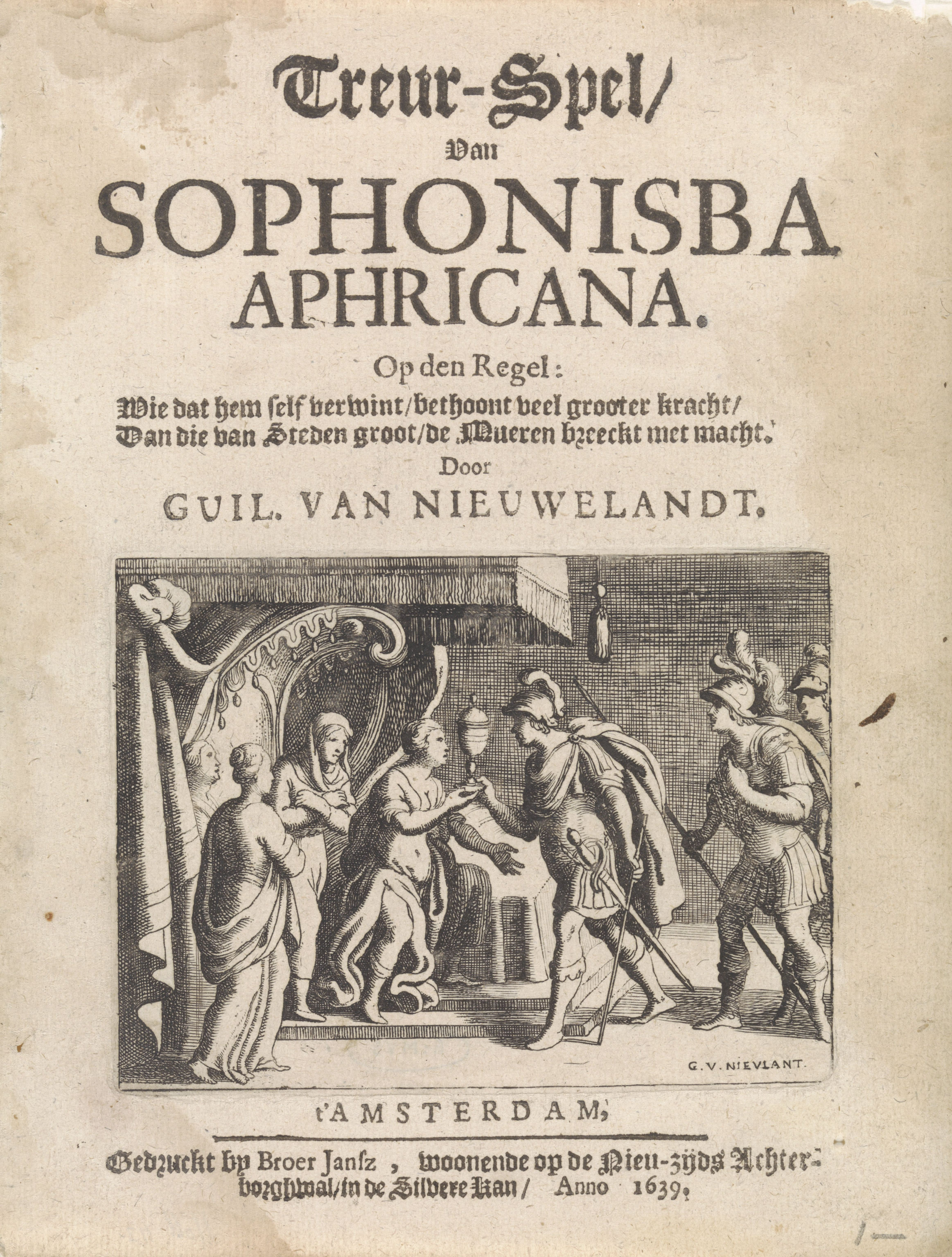
Title page of Nieulandt's tragedy Sophonisba Aphricana, 1639

=== Poetry ===
- Poëma van den Mensch (1621)

=== Drama ===
- Livia (1617)
- Saul (1617)
- Claudius Domitius Nero (1618)
- Aegyptica (1624)
- Sophonisba Aphricana (1626, 1635)
- Salomon (1628)
- Jerusalems Verwoestingh door Nabuchodonosor (1635)

== Public collections ==
- Musée des Beaux-Arts de Tours, Tours
- Museum of Fine Arts (Budapest), Budapest
- Norton Museum of Art, West Palm Beach
- Pushkin Museum, Moscow
- Rijksmuseum, Amsterdam
- Royal Museum of Fine Arts, Antwerp
