= Willem Ogier =

Flemish writer and schoolmaster

Guilliam Ogier
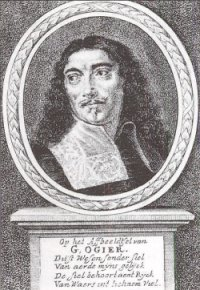
- Portrait of Ogier etched by Gaspar Bouttats for the publication of De seven hooft-sonden (1682)
- Born: 17 July 1618; Antwerp
- Died: 22 February 1689 (aged 70); Antwerp
- Writing career
- Pen name: Liefde doet sorgen
- Language: Dutch
- Period: Baroque
- Genre: drama
- Subject: moral satire
- Notable work: De seven hooft-sonden (1682)
- Literary movement: chamber of rhetoric

Willem (or Guilliam) Ogier (1618–1689) was a Flemish schoolmaster, playwright and comedian.

== Life ==
Guilliam Ogier was born in Antwerp in 1618 but brought up in Amsterdam. He returned to Antwerp after his father's death and registered with the schoolmasters' guild in 1644, becoming dean of the guild during the 1650s. He wrote comedic moralities for performance by the chambers of rhetoric (civic poetry and drama societies) the Violieren and the Olijftak. First performances were often on the Feast of St. Luke (18 October), as the rhetoricians had a close association with the Guild of Saint Luke (the guild of painters, illuminators, printmakers and booksellers). When the Olyftack and Violieren merged in 1660 Ogier took a leading role as "Factor" of the reinstituted chamber. He died in Antwerp on 22 February 1689.

Guilliam Ogier was the father of the playwright Barbara Ogier, who also took part in the Olijftak.

== Plays ==
- Droncken Heyn (Drunken Harry), first performed by the Olyftack on 18 October 1639
- De hooveerdigheydt (Pride), first performed by the Violieren on 18 October 1644
- De gramschap (Anger), first performed by the Violieren on 18 October 1645
- De onkuysheydt (Unchastity), first performed by the Violieren on 18 October 1646
- Den haet en nydt (Hatred and envy), first performed by the Violieren on 18 October 1647 (text of the Amsterdam performance, 1671, available on Google Books)
- De traegheydt (Sloth), first performed by the Olyftack on 18 October 1677
- De gierigheydt (Miserliness), first performed by the Olyftack on 18 February 1678
- Belachelijk misverstant ofte boere geck (Ludicrous misunderstanding or country bumpkin), first performed by the Olyftack on 18 October 1680

== Publication ==
Ogier's seven moralities were collected for publication as De seven hooft-sonden (The seven deadly sins) in 1682, with Droncken Heyn reworked as De Gulsigheydt (Gluttony).

A critical edition of his plays was edited by Willem van Eeghem and A.A. Keersmaekers and published in three volumes as Willem Ogier: De tooneelwerken (Antwerp and Amsterdam, 1921–1955).

== Studies ==
- August Snieders, "Lezing: Willem Ogier en zijn tijd", Verslagen en mededelingen van de Koninklijke Vlaamse Academie voor Taal- en Letterkunde (1888): 70–86.
