= Van den Eynde (surname) =

Van den Eynde, Van Den Eynde, van den Eynde or Vanden Eynde is a surname. Notable people with the surname include:

- Alphonse Vanden Eynde (1884 – 1951), Belgian architect
- Bastiaan Van den Eynde (born 2000), Belgian basketball player
- Catherine van den Eynde (fl. 1605 – 1629), Flemish tapestry weaver
- François Vanden Eynde (1911–?), Belgian footballer
- Gilles Van den Eynde (fl. 1695), Belgian architect
- Guillaume Vanden Eynde (1884 – 1948), Belgian footballer
- Hendrik van den Eynde (fl. 1517), Flemish physician and correspondent of Erasmus
- Hendrik van den Eynde (1869 – 1939), Dutch sculptor
- Huibrecht van den Eynde (1593 – 1662), Flemish sculptor
- Jack Van den Eynde (1914 – 1993), Belgian footballer
- Jacob van den Eynde (c. 1515 – 1569), Dutch statesman, Grand Pensionary of Holland
- Jacobus van den Eynde (died 1729), Flemish organ builder
- Jan van den Eynde (late 16th or early 17th century – 1674), Flemish merchant, banker and art collector
- Jan van den Eynde II (1620 – 1702), Flemish architect, sculptor and merchant
- Jef Van den Eynde (1879 – 1929), Belgian activist
- Louis Van den Eynde (1881 – 1966), Belgian painter
- Lucas Van den Eynde (born 1959), Belgian film actor
- Maarten Vanden Eynde (born 1977), Belgian artist
- Niels Van Den Eynde (born 2000), Belgian basketball player
- Norbertus van den Eynde (1628 – 1704), Flemish sculptor
- Oscar van den Eynde de Rivieren (1864 – 1950), Belgian nobleman and parliamentarian
- Petrus van den Eynde (1787 – 1840), Dutch lithographer
- Sebastiaen van den Eynde (1625 – 1693), Flemish sculptor
- Stan Vanden Eynde (1909 – 1994), Belgian footballer
- Willy Van den Eynde (born 1943), Belgian racing cyclist

== See also ==
- Van den Eynde (family), Netherlandish noble family
- Wim Van Eynde (born 1960), Belgian cyclist
- The Deep Eynde, is a deathrock/punk band from Los Angeles, California
