= Jan van den Eynde II =

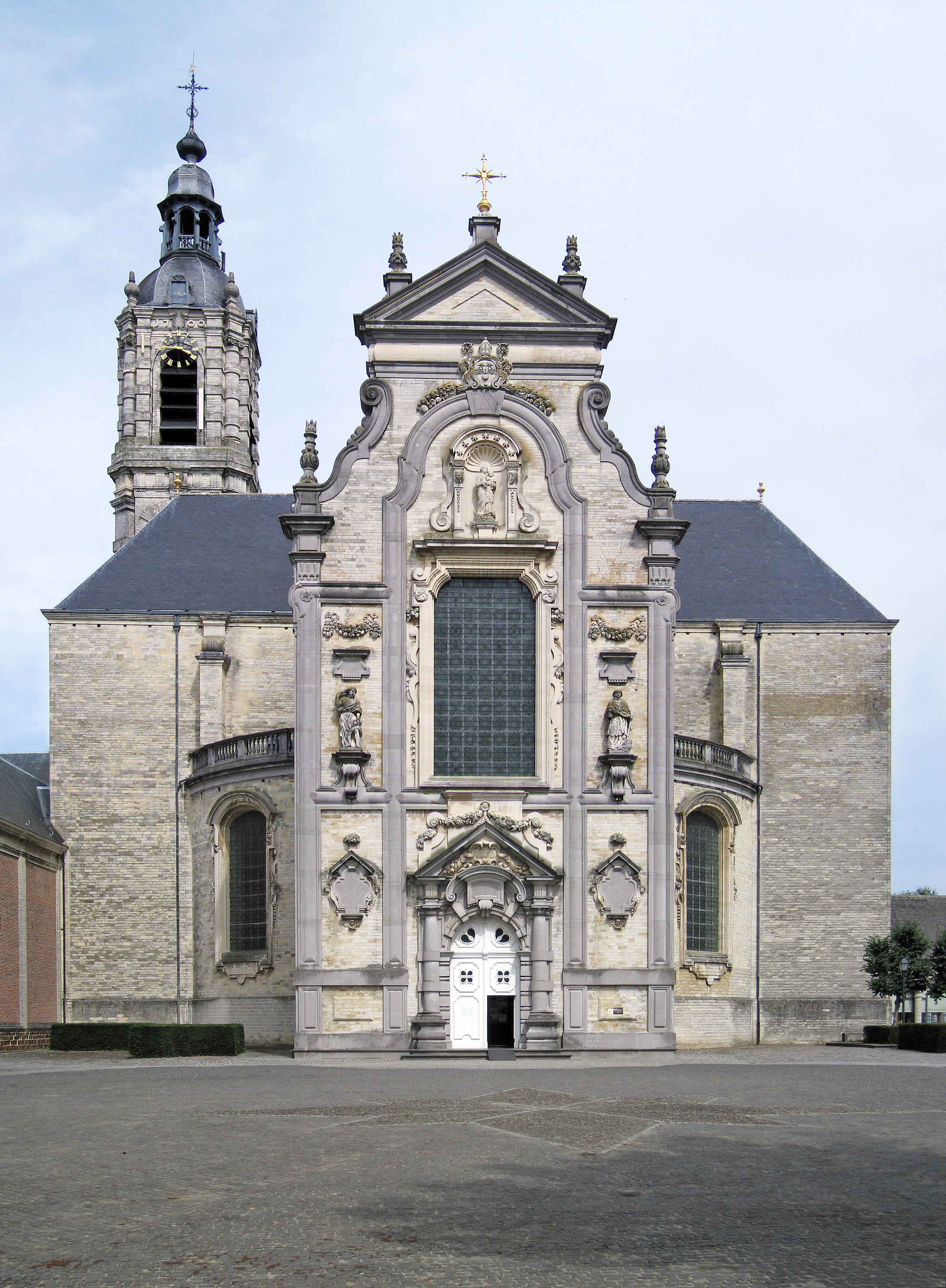
Facade of Averbode Abbey church

Jan van den Eynde II (1620 – 1702) was a Flemish architect and sculptor. He was a member of the van den Eynde family of artists from Antwerp. Van den Eynde's most famous building is arguably the Averbode Abbey church, a peculiar synthesis of Baroque and Gothic with a touch of Renaissance to it, which was completed between 1664 and 1672. For this project, van den Eynde's plans were chosen over those of the famous architect Lucas Faydherbe from Mechelen. In addition to being an architect, Jan van den Eynde was also a merchant.

== Life ==
Van den Eynde was born into the renowned Antwerp van den Eynde family which had produced many sculptors and merchants. His father was Cornelis van den Eynde, an architect and merchant. In the late 17th century, the van den Eynde family was one of the most prominent families of sculptors in Antwerp, which formed together with the Quellinus, Verbrugghen, Willemssens and Scheemaeckers sculpture workshops a powerful consortium, which secured a monopoly on the sculpture market in Antwerp. Collaboration among these workshops in the late 17th century was likely the main factor to account for the intricate "unity of style and approaches that have made disentangling of hands particularly difficult for art historians." He was the brother of Sebastiaen van den Eynde and the nephew of Huibrecht van den Eynde, both renowned sculptors.

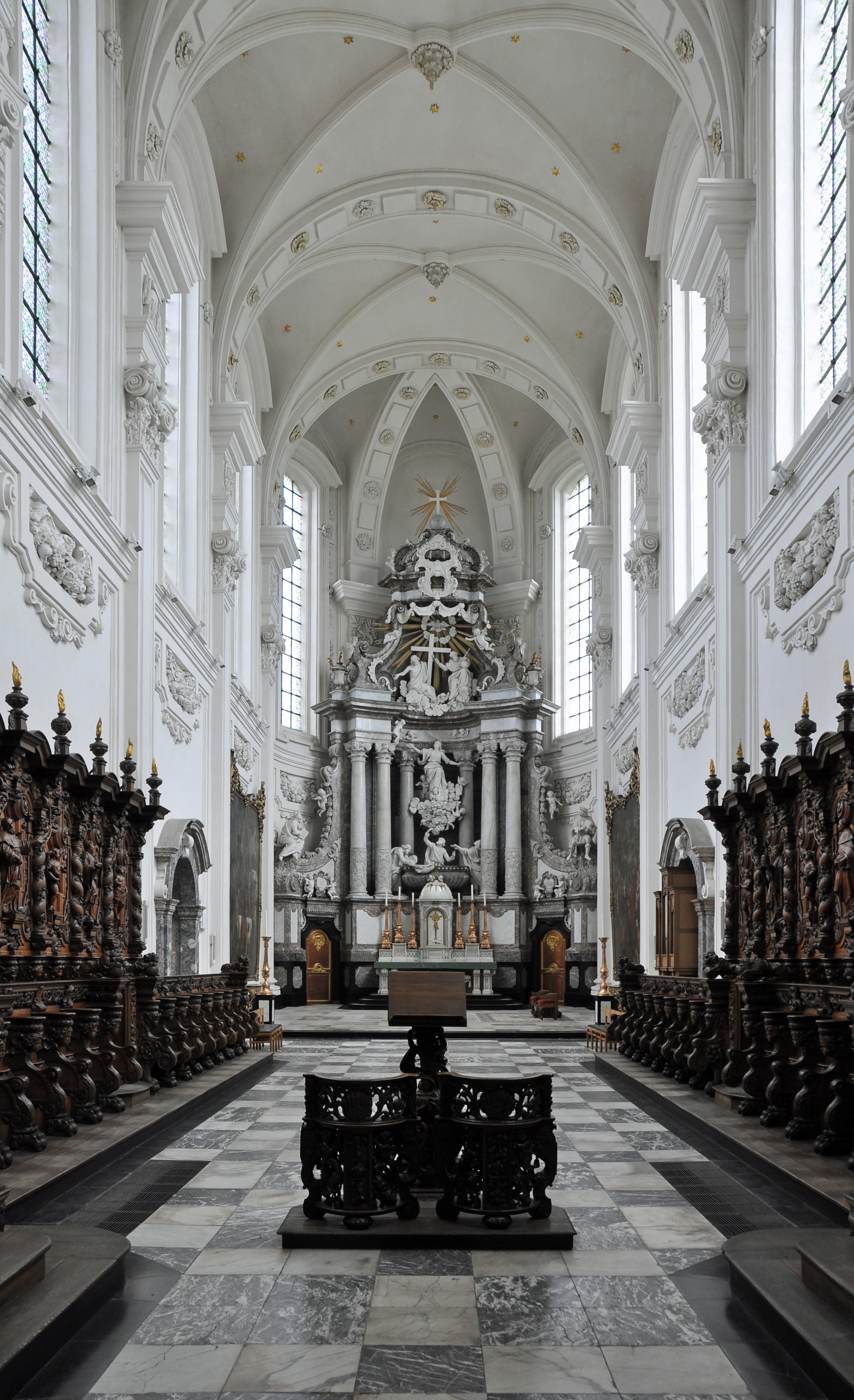
Nave of Averbode Abbey church

Some of Jan van den Eyndes estate was inherited and thus unrelated to his business activities. He was worth over 100,000 guilders (for comparison, the price for a comfortable house in Antwerp was at the time between one and two thousand guilders). He was by marriage linked to various noble families. He was on very good terms with his brother Sebastiaen as in a common will dated 1680, they made each other their legatee and stressed their common interest in architecture, sculpture and commerce. The brothers were involved in many joint business transactions such as real estate dealings.

== Work ==
In 1664, van den Eynde was awarded the commission for the design of the church of Averbode Abbey, having been chosen over Lucas Faydherbe.

Construction began on 31 July 1664. No dome was built over the central section because in January 1668 one of the major piers collapsed. Because two other pillars collapsed thereafter, the fourth pillar also had to be pulled down. Works restarted with more solid material and the building was roofed by the end of 1670. The community inaugurated the new abbey church on 11 July, 1672, the feast of St. Norbert. The solemn consecration was not celebrated until 19 June, 1681. Van den Eynde also produced the church's sculptures.

The ground plan of the Averbode Abbey church combined a centralized cruciform space to the west for the laity with a deep choir, necessary for Norbertine choral services. The treatment of space was more emphatic in Averbode Abbey's church than in other Norbertine abbey churches, on account of the happy combination of a radial plan with a very long and axially accentuated choir. The design combined Gothic structural forms, such as ribbed vaults, with Renaissance ornamental details. The church is considered a peculiar synthesis of Baroque and Gothic.
