= Waterpoort (Antwerp) =

Gate in Antwerp, Belgium

Coordinates: 51°12′29″N 4°23′20″E

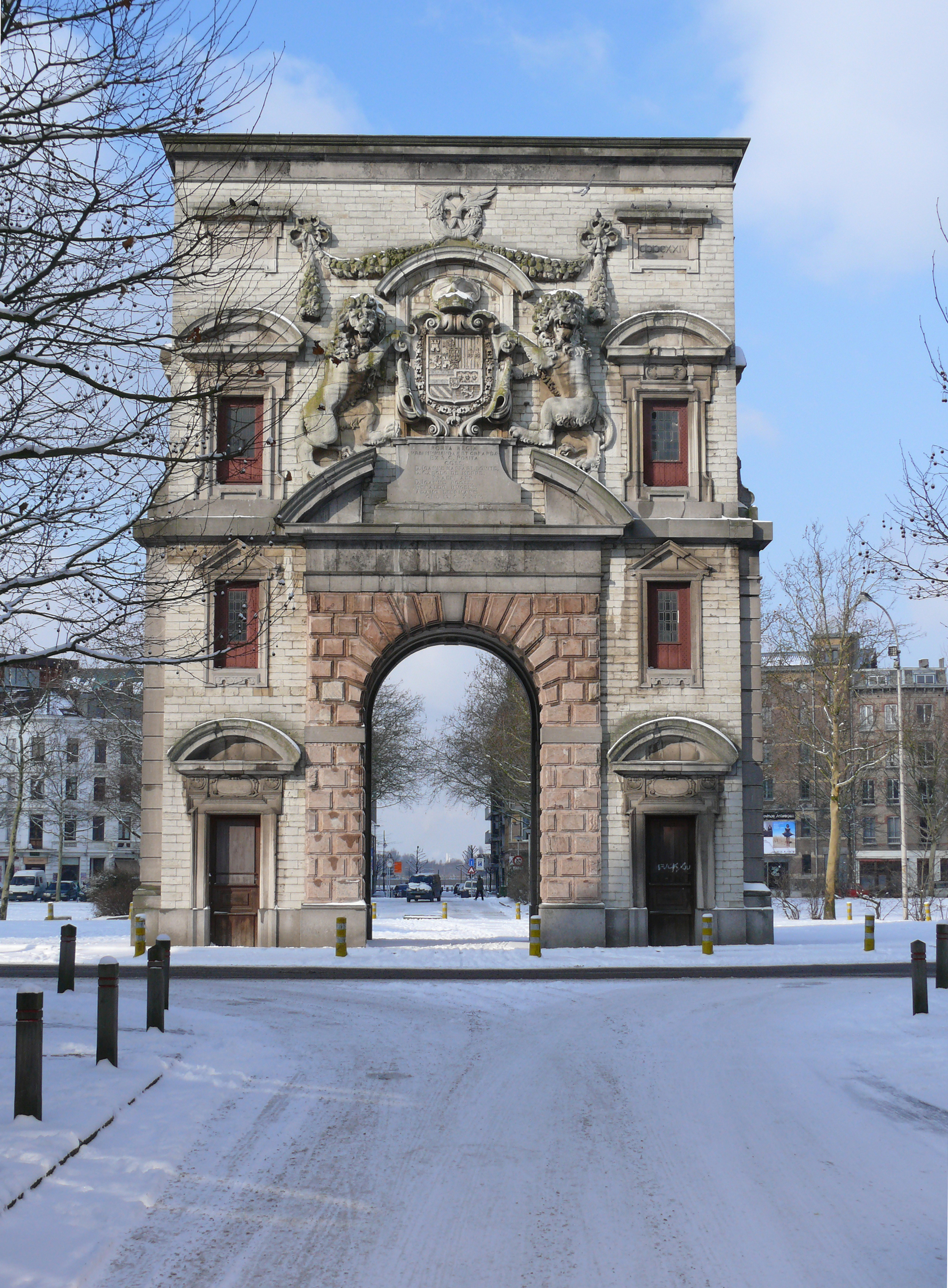
Waterpoort on the Gedempte Zuiderdokken, seen from the Kasteelstraat.

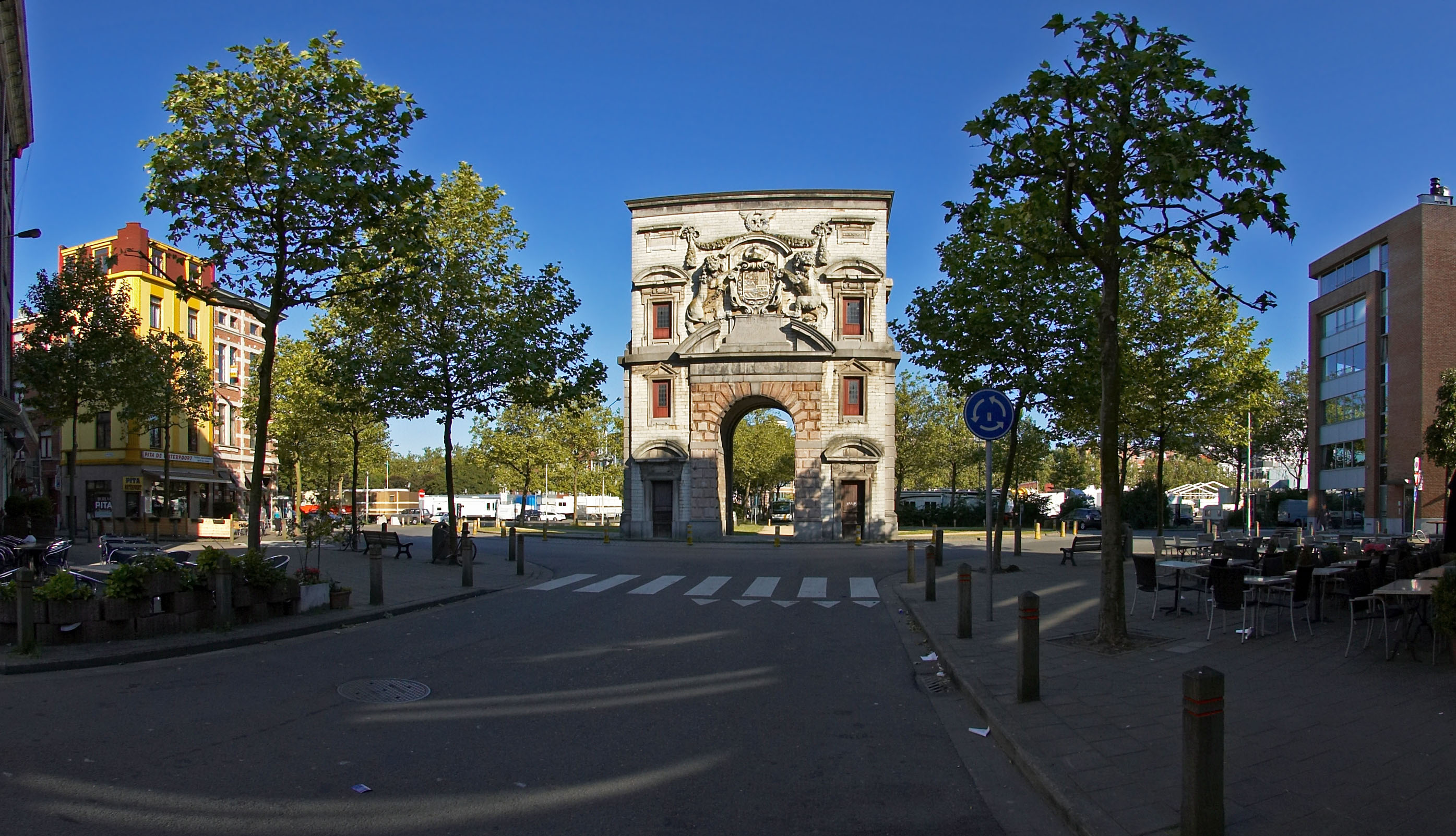
Waterpoort

The Waterpoort (also known as Porta Regia, and Coninckxpoort) is a monumental gate located in the Zuiderdokken, Zuid Antwerp, Belgium. The gate was sculpted by Huibrecht van den Eynde and Johannes van Mildert, and was erected in 1624. It originally served as a water gate on the Scheldt river, as well as an honorary gate to King Philip IV of Spain.

== History ==
The Waterpoort was erected in 1624, and originally served as a water gate on the Scheldt river, functioning as a passage to the river from the fortified wall that protected the city of Antwerp, through which boats could get to the Vlasmarkt from the Scheldt side. Inscriptions on both sides of the gate indicate this early function, as well as its role as an honorary arch to King Philip IV of Spain. The gate's design has been attributed to Peter Paul Rubens, although, as opposed to the identity of the sculptors (Huibrecht van den Eynde and Johannes van Mildert), there is no hard evidence of Rubens' involvement.

Following works on the Scheldt quays, the gate was moved to the Sint-Jansvliet in the 1880s. When, in 1933, the entrance building of the new Sint-Anna pedestrian tunnel had to be built in that location, the gate was moved again. In 1936 it was eventually rebuilt on the Gillisplaats in the Zuid, on the Zuiderdokken. Because it was moved twice, the arch is nicknamed 'the wandering gate'.
