= Maagdenhuis Museum =

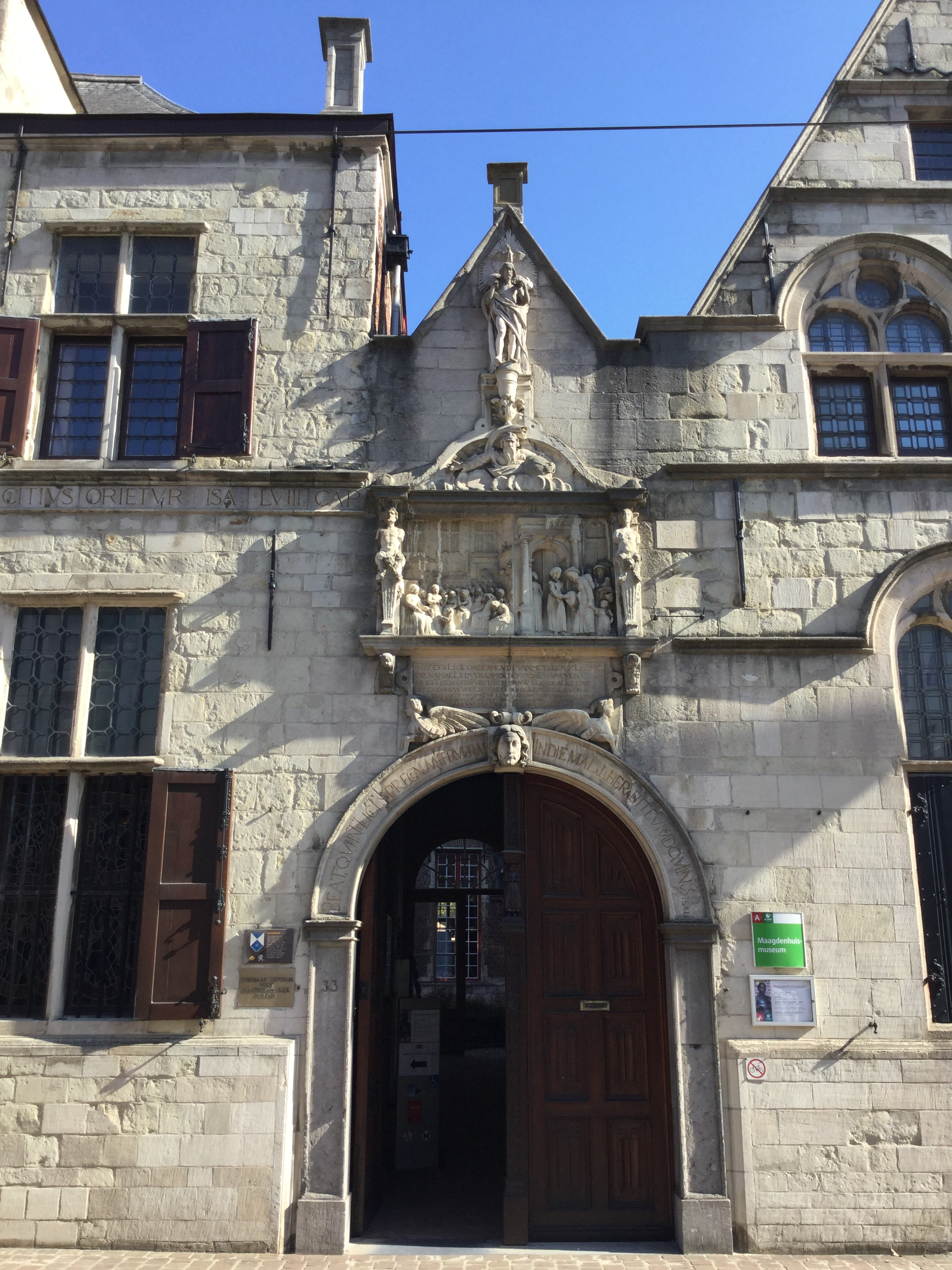
- Façade of the museum
- Established: 1884
- Location: Lange Gasthuisstraat, 33; 2000 Antwerp, Belgium
- Coordinates: 51.214390°N 4.405730°E
- Type: Art museum, Historical museum
- Website: www.maagdenhuis.be/en

The Maagdenhuis Museum (Maidens' House Museum) is an art museum and historical museum located in a 17th-century historic building on Lange Gasthuisstraat, Antwerp, Belgium. The building was used as an orphanage for the maegdeckens, or maidens, from the mid-16th century to the end of the 19th century. The museum presents a collection of utensils used daily by the foundlings and the orphans; a collection of antique furniture, and a series of documents relating to the orphanage and the life in it from the 16th century to 19th century.

Although one of the smallest museums in Antwerp, the Maagdenhuis houses a valuable and rich collection of paintings and sculptures. The collection includes works by artists such as Peter Paul Rubens, Jacob Jordaens, Pieter Aertsen, Otto van Veen, Simon De Vos, Maarten Pepijn, Huibrecht van den Eynde, and Walter Pompe.

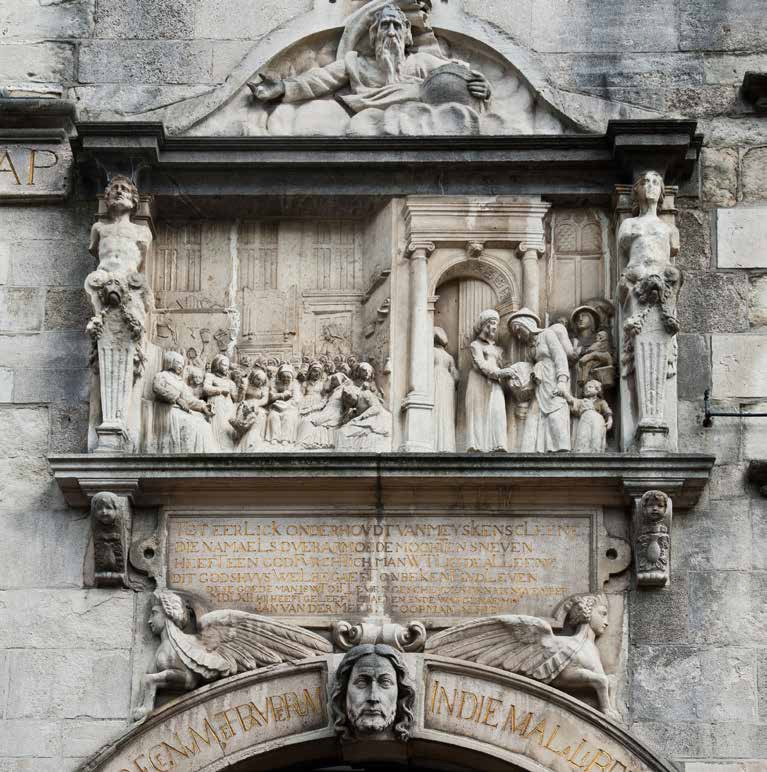
Detail of museum's façade; Façade c.1634; Bas-reliefs, by Cornelis Floris de Vriendt, c. 1564

== History ==
The museum is located in a historic building dating from the sixteenth century. It was formerly an orphanage for young girls. The building started to function as an orphanage for little girls in 1552. The Maagdenhuis (Maidens' house) was significantly expanded in 1634–1636. Today's white stone façade was built during the 1634-1636 renovation. The façade's bas-relief was probably designed by Cornelis Floris de Vriendt and dates back to 1564. It portrays a group of orphaned girls (bottom left) and a teacher leading them into the orphanage (right). These two scenes are flanked by a pair of guarding Hermes figures, overhung by God, Christ as the Good Shepherd, and an allegorical dove. In 1882 the orphans moved to two new and larger buildings on Albert Grisarstraat Street, which replaced the Maidens’ House and the Boys’ Orphanage. The Maidens’ House finally closed and the building remained vacant. The larger buildings on Albert Grisarstraat Street were replaced by smaller institutions in the 20th century.

Over the centuries, all these charitable institutions accumulated a bunch of artwork received as gifts and bequests from rich benefactors. The administrators of the two orphanages, the Board of Civilian Almshouses, moved 84 paintings to the former chapel of the Maidens’ House, which opened in 1884 as a museum.

However, most of the collection was moved to the Museum of Fine Arts a few years later.

Finally, in 1925 the Commission of Civilian Almhouses, overseeing the orphanages, merged with the Office of Charity. The newfound organization (the Commissie van Openbare Onderstand, or COO) found itself with a huge art collection and decided to turn the chapel of the Lange Gasthuisstraat's building into a museum, which was opened in 1930.

The museum gradually expanded its collection in the following decades, with the Royal Museum of Fine Arts returning several masterpieces to the Maaggdenhuis over the years.

In 1976, all Belgian COOs (Public Poverty Commissions) were turned into Public Centers for Social Welfare. As a result, today the Maagdenhuis Museum is overseen by Antwerp's Public Social Welfare Center.

== Collection ==
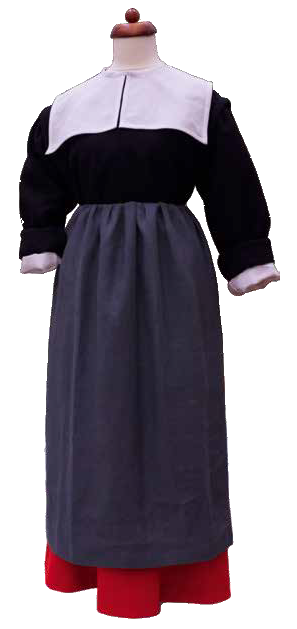
21st-century replica of the uniform worn by the orphans of the Maagdenhuis based on the paintings of Herreyns and Joannes de Maré

In the orphanage's former chapel, which was the first room to be turned into a museum, there is a collection of utensils used by the orphans and the foundlings and objects that interest them, including porridge bowls, foundling dresses and identifiers, embroidered samplers, antique furniture; and a collection of documents regarding the Maagenhuis.

In the same room are a few paintings, such as van Overbeke's Triptych of the crucifixion, and Huibrecht van den Eynde's The Virgin Mary with the Child Jesus.

In the Reception, where there stood the administration of the Maidens' House and the catalogue with all the names of the orphans living at Maagdenhuis, there is a first assortment of paintings, which includes opera by Peter Ykens, Cornelis Schut and Erasmus Quellinus the Younger.

In the Chairman's Hall, where the regent and the almoners used to convene, there is a second group of paintings, by artists such as Frans Floris, Pieter van Avont, Maarten Pepyn, and David Teniers the Younger.

In the Side Corridor, which runs between the museum galleries, there hang paintings by artists like Frans Francken the Elder, Abraham Bloemaert, and Hendrick de Clerck.

In what used to be the first of three kitchens, there is the Rubens Gallery, with paintings by Peter Paul Rubens, Thomas Willeboirts Bosschaert and Otto van Veen, among others.

In what used to be the large kitchen, or the groote ceucken, there is the Sixteenth-century Gallery, with artworks by painters such as Jacob de Backer and Michiel Coxie.

At the end of the side corridor, to the right, there is the Van Der Meere Gallery, with a masterpiece by Jacob Jordaens and other paintings by artists such as Theodoor van Loon and Abraham de Vries.

The Fifteenth-century Gallery is located in the smallest room of the Maagdenhuis Museum. Little is known about his rooms, except that three old women lived there in the 17th century, having donated funds to the almoners in exchange for a room and boarding at the Maagdenhuis. This gallery includes several paintings by unknown masters, including a 15th-century Last Judgement, the Seven Acts of Mercy and the Seven Deadly Sins.

In the Courtyard there stands the annex in which the orphans lived and worked. The courtyard accommodates several sculptures and inscriptions, among which a wooden, 17th-century statue by an unknown master, Wooden Clara; a copy of Van den Eynde's original sculpture The Virgin Mary with the Child Jesus in the chapel; and Sebastiaen van den Eynde's Portrait of Cornelis II Landschot, ca. 1656.

== Gallery ==
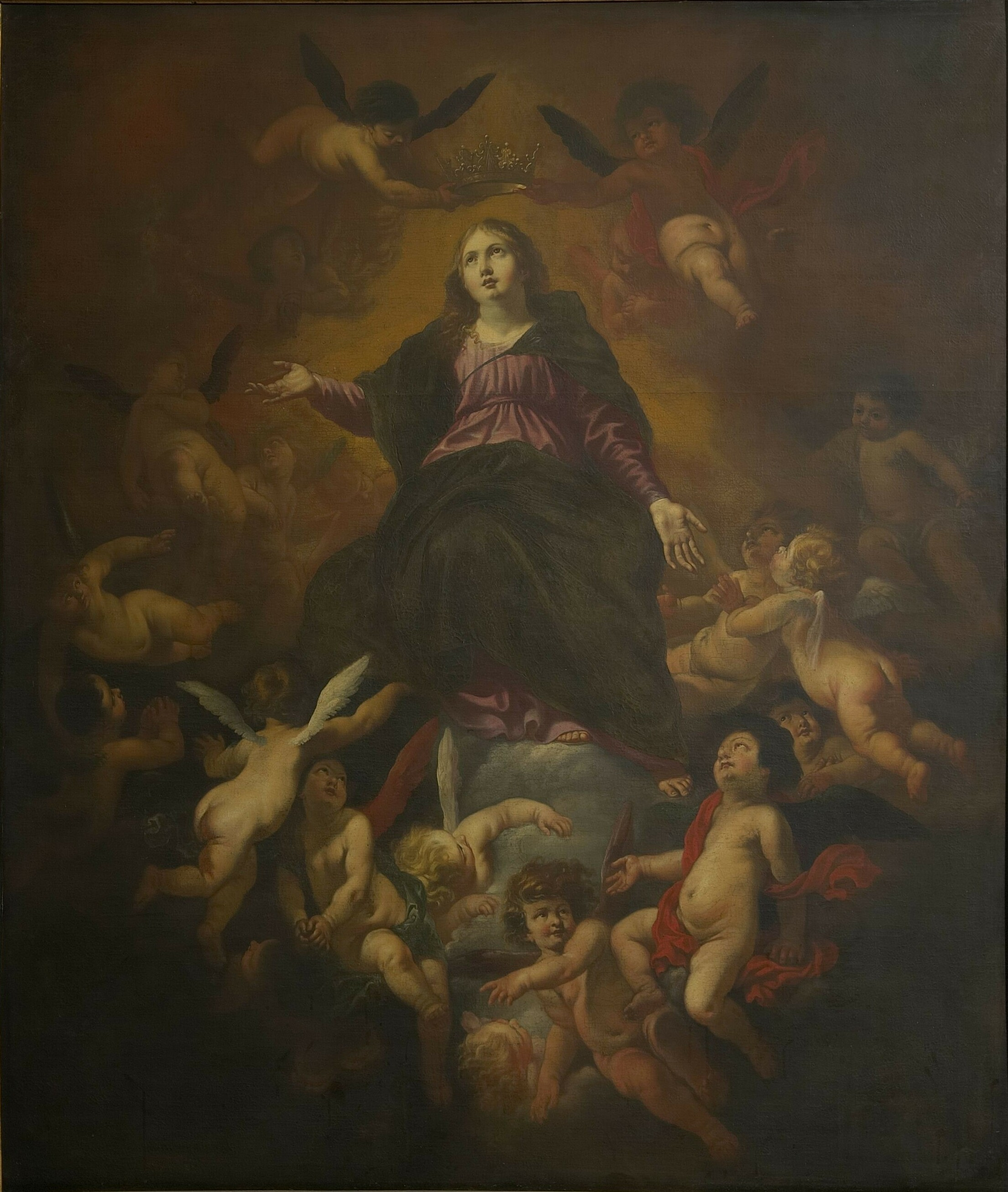
The Assumption of the Virgin Mary by Cornelis Schut. Early 17th century

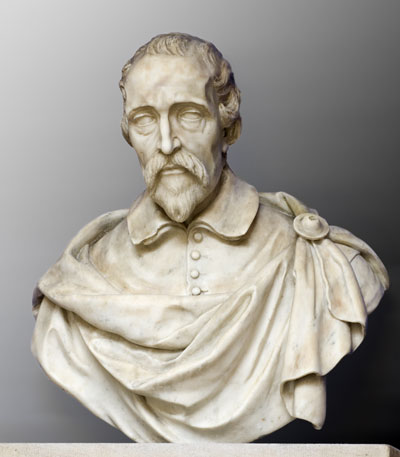
Bust of Cornelis II Landschot by Sebastiaen van den Eynde. c. 1656

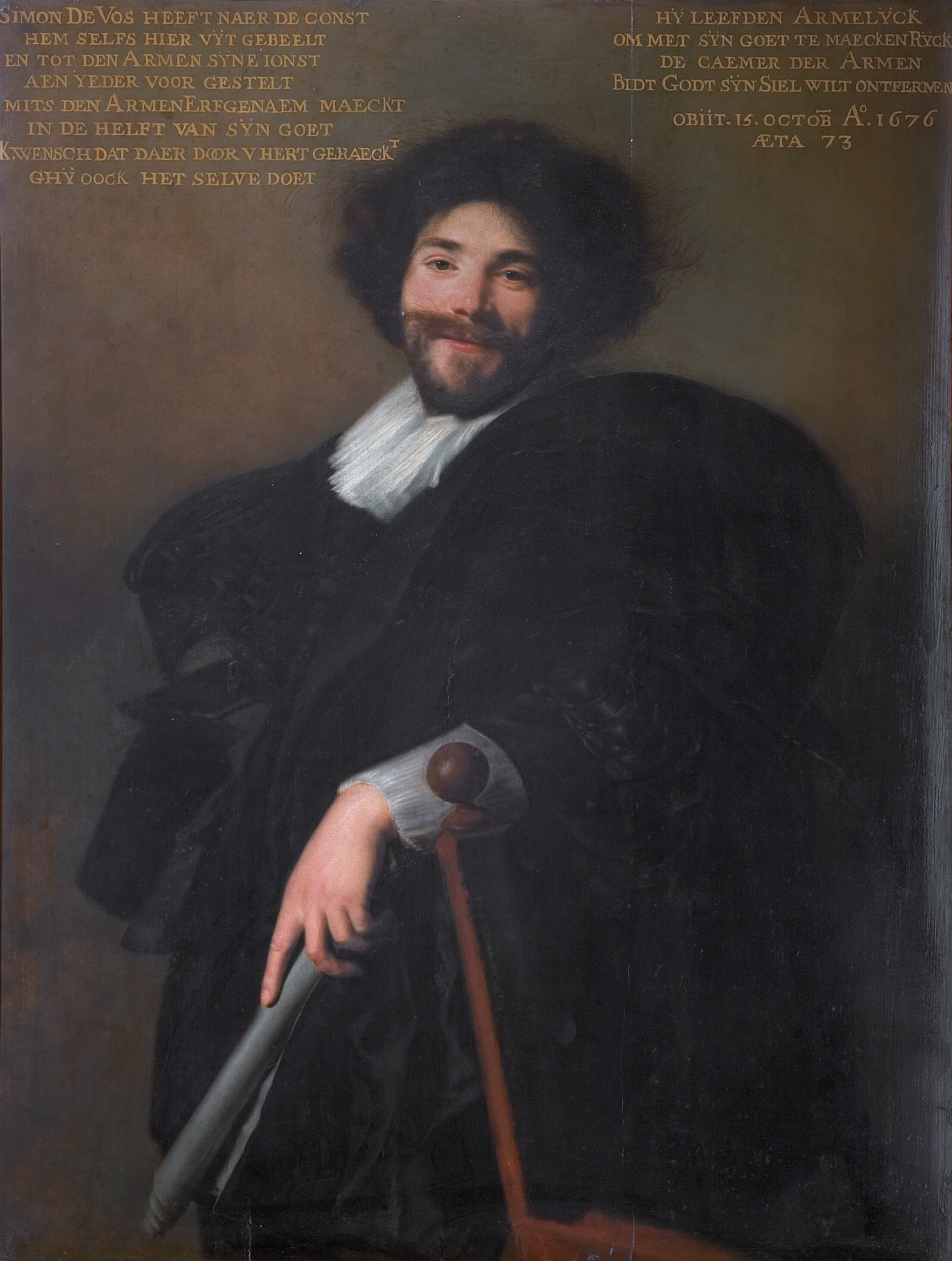
Portrait of Simon de Vos by Abraham de Vries. c. 1650

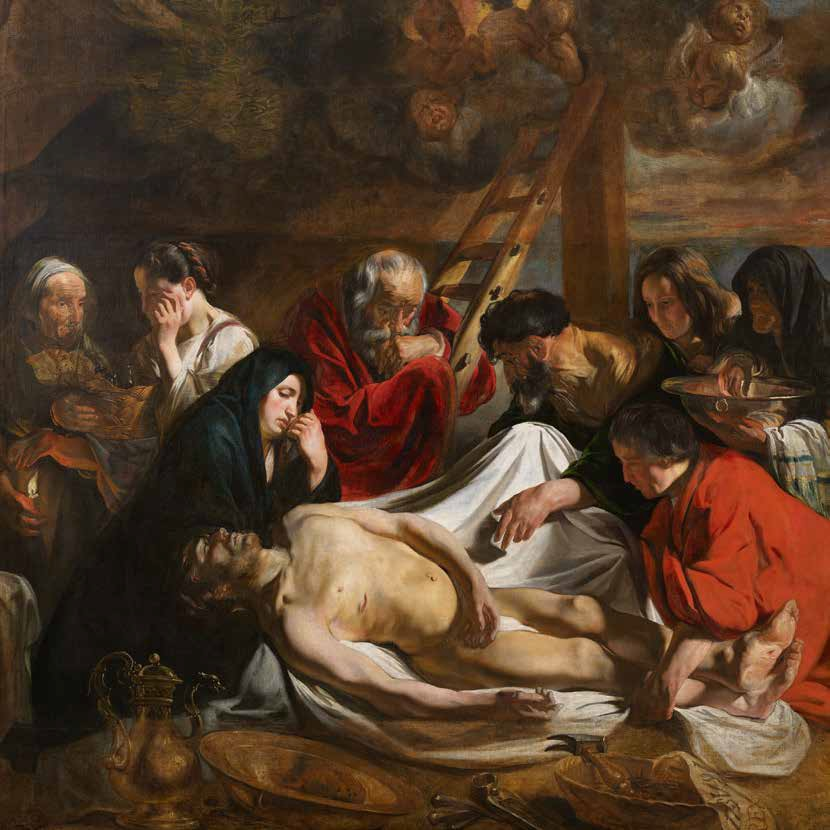
The Washing and Anointing of the Body of Christ by Jacob Jordaens. c. 1620

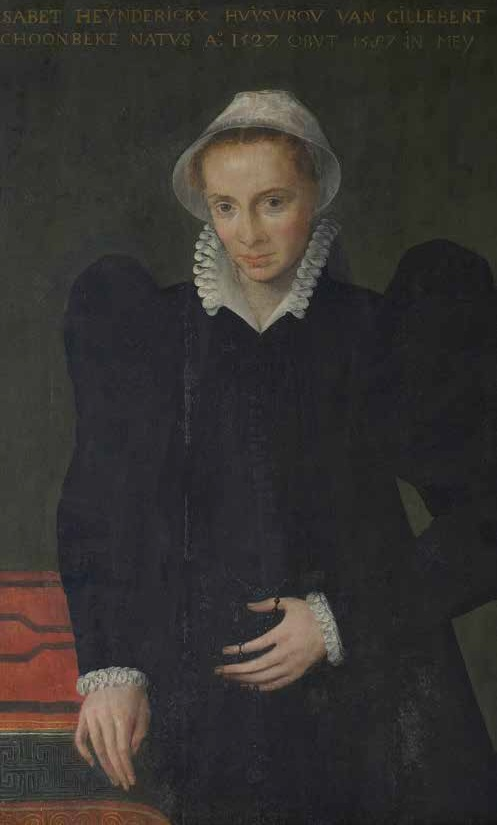
Portrait of Elisabeth Heynderickx by Frans Floris. Early 16th century

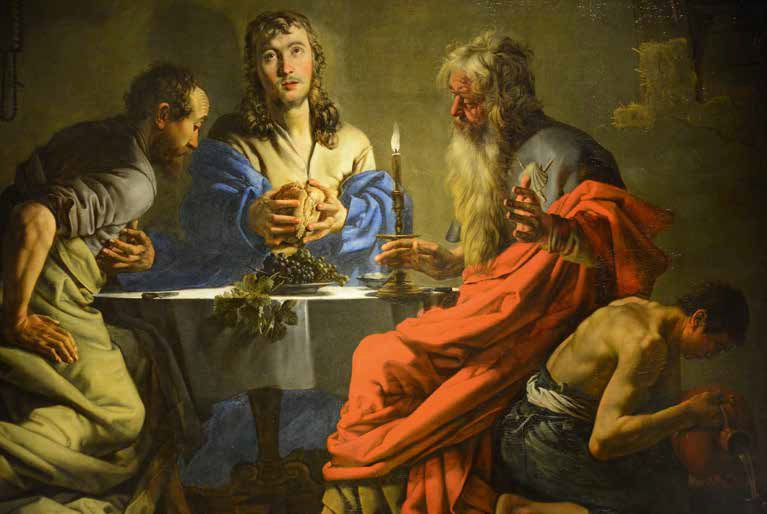
The Men of Emmaus by Theodoor van Loon. Early 17th century

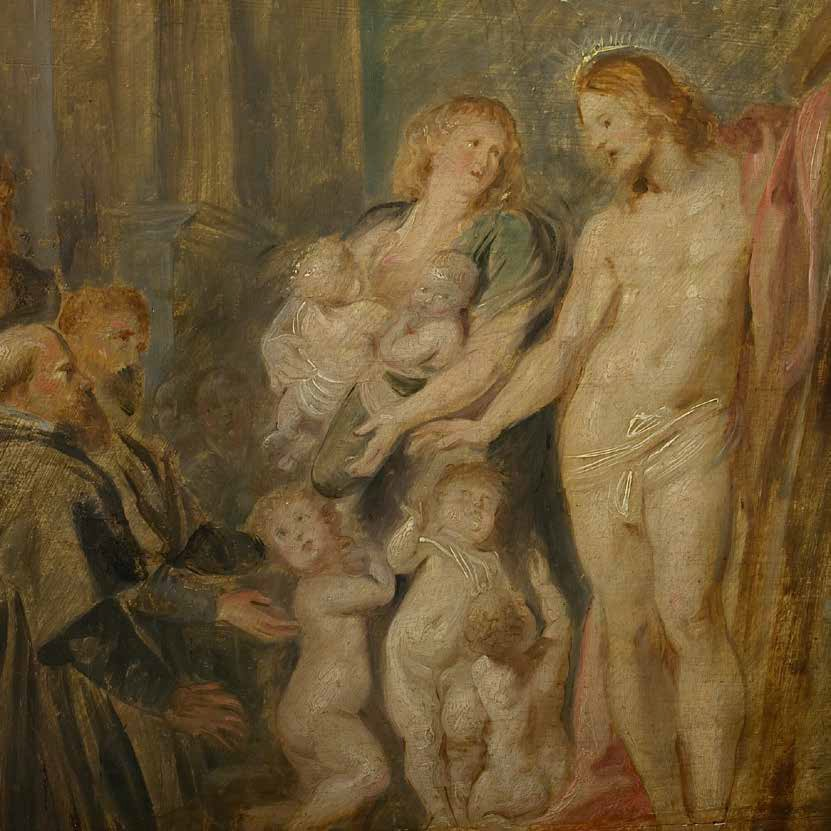
Christ, Defender of the Orphans by Peter Paul Rubens. Early 17th century

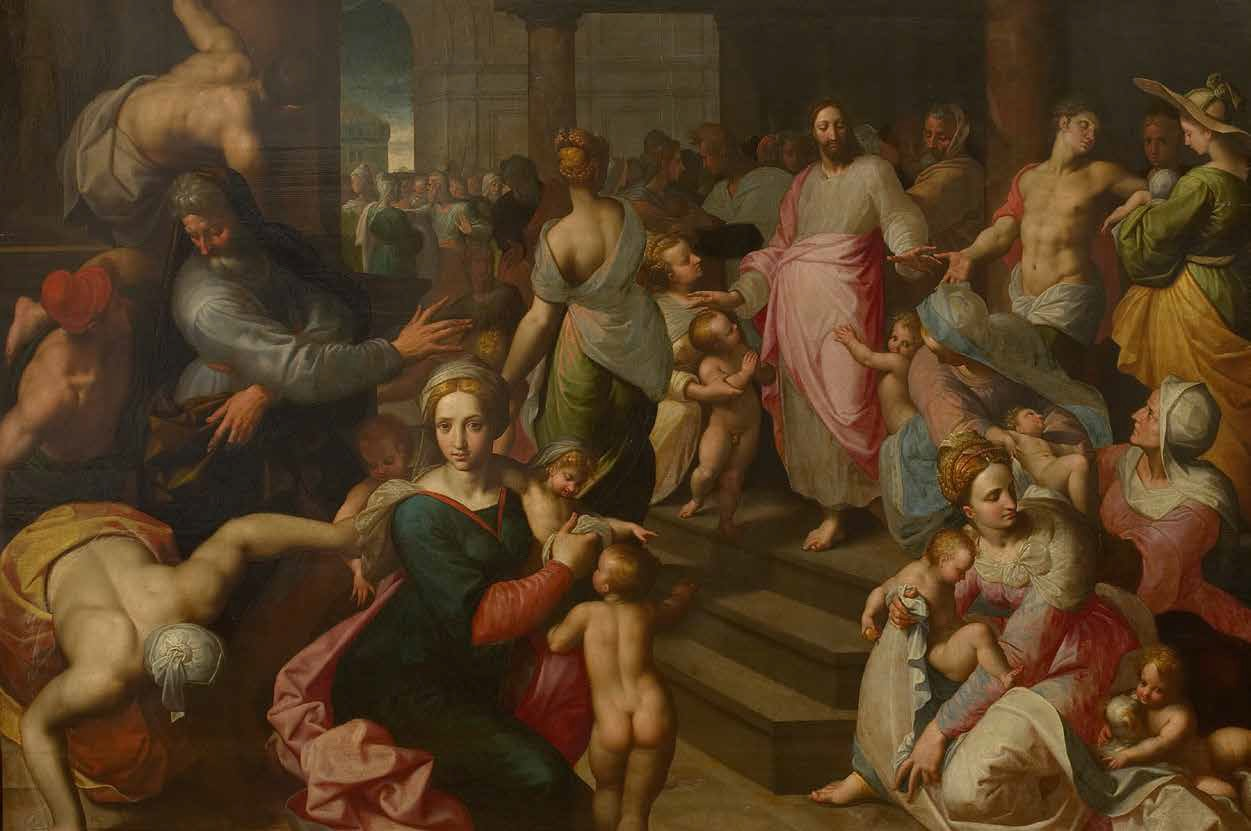
Let the Little Children Come to Me by Jacob de Backer. Late 16th century

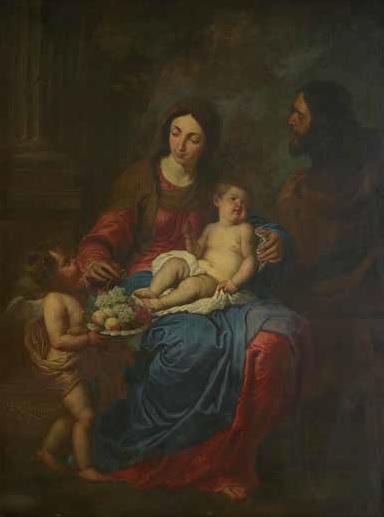
The Holy Family by Erasmus Quellinus the Younger. Early 17th century

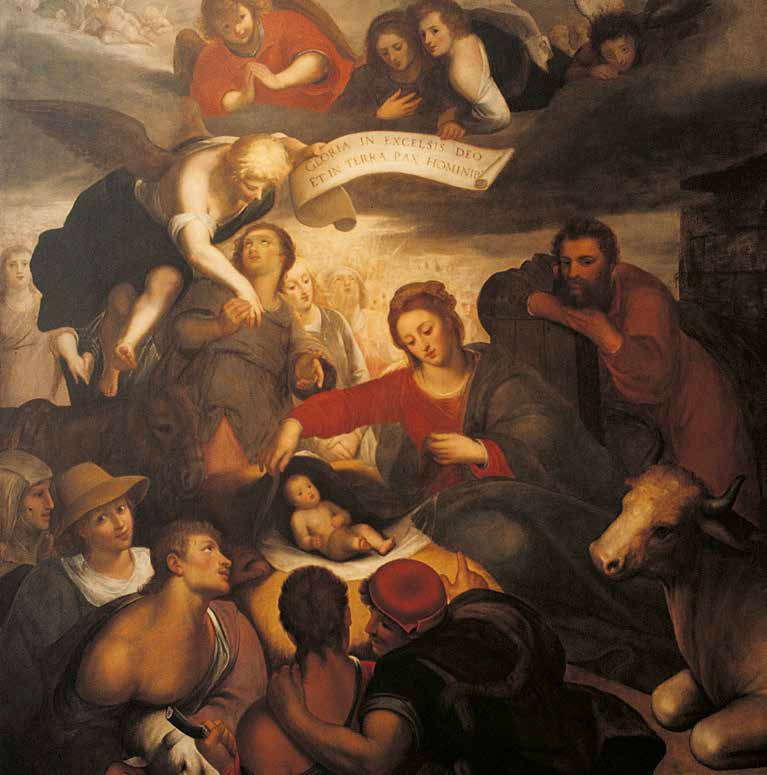
The Adoration of the Shepherds by Otto van Veen c. 1585

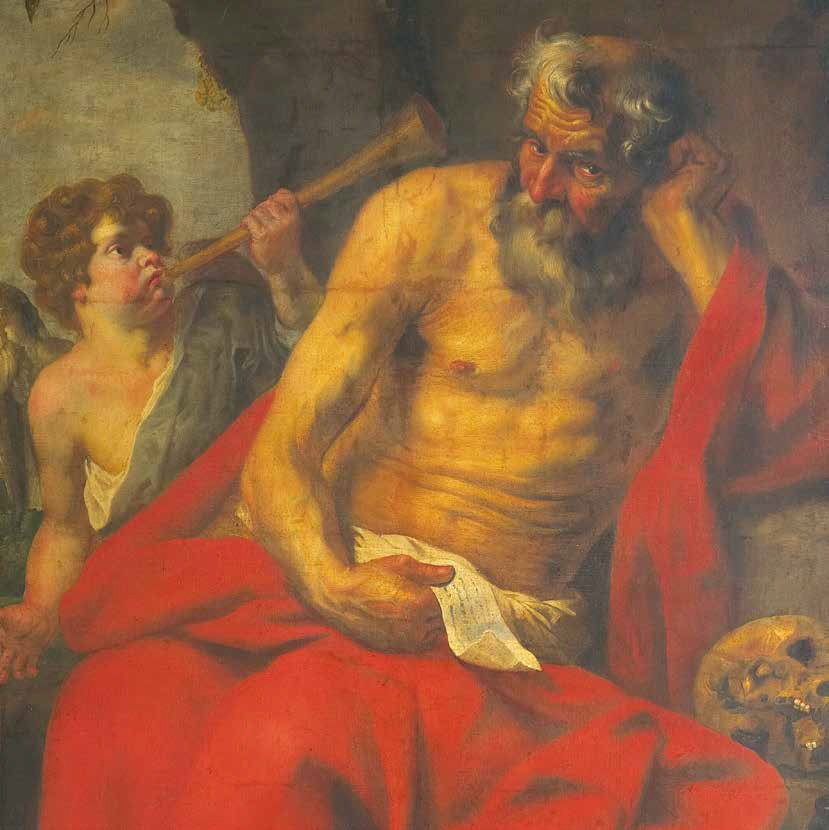
Saint Jerome at first attributed to Van Dyck, later to one of his followers. Early 17th century

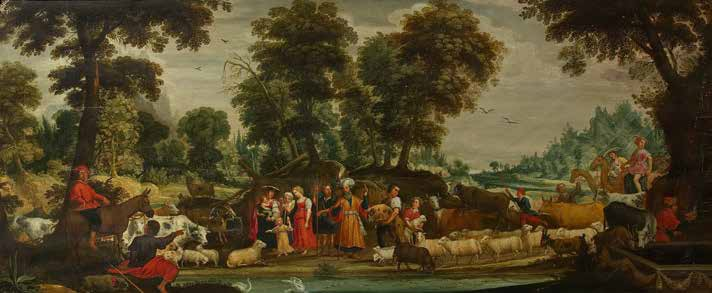
Jacob's Scheme to Multiply his Flock by David Teniers the Younger. 17th century

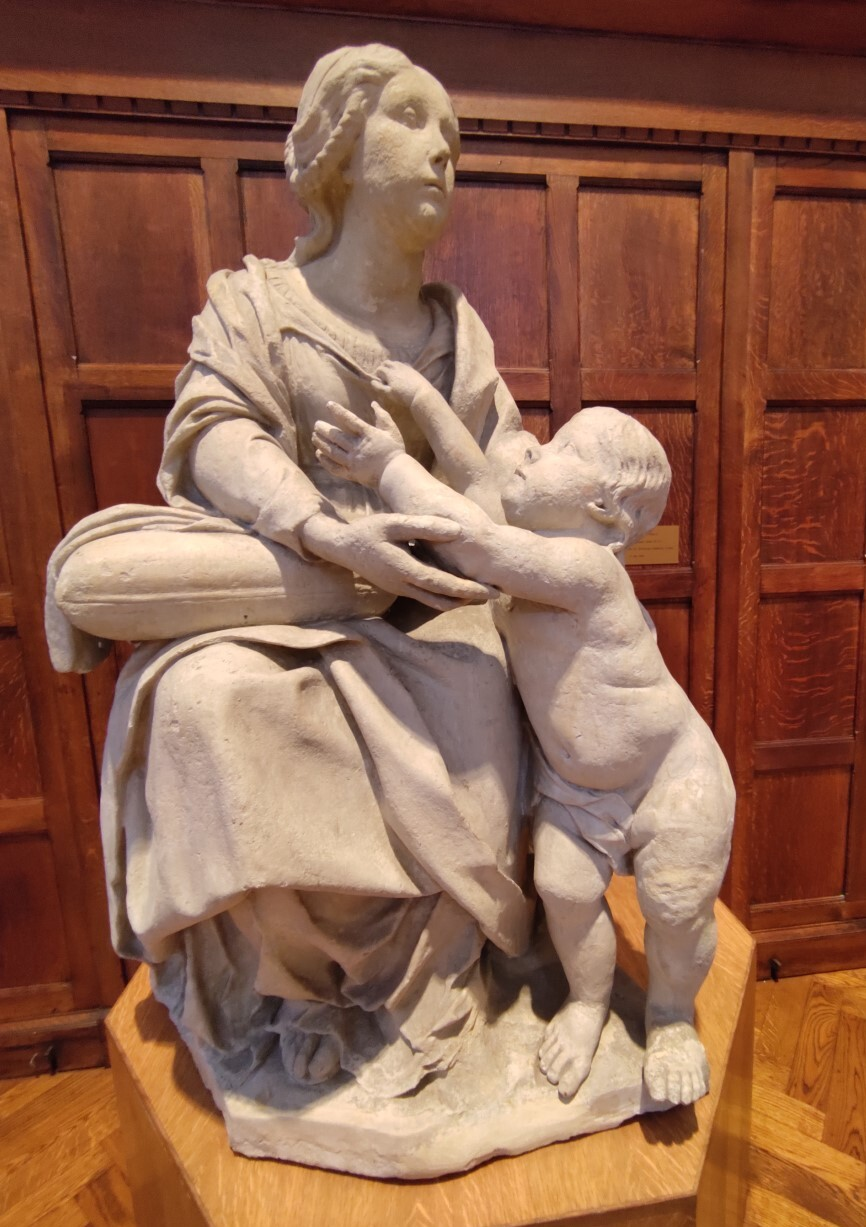
The Virgin Mary with the Child Jesus by Huibrecht van den Eynde c. 1636

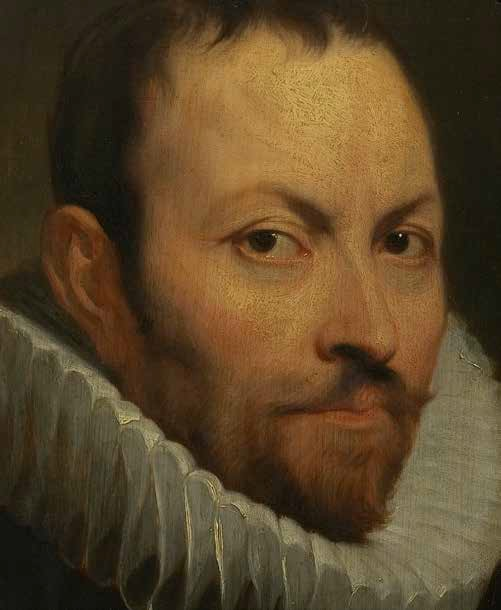
Portrait of Chevalier Nicolaas Rockox by Thomas Willeboirts Bosschaert. c. 1641

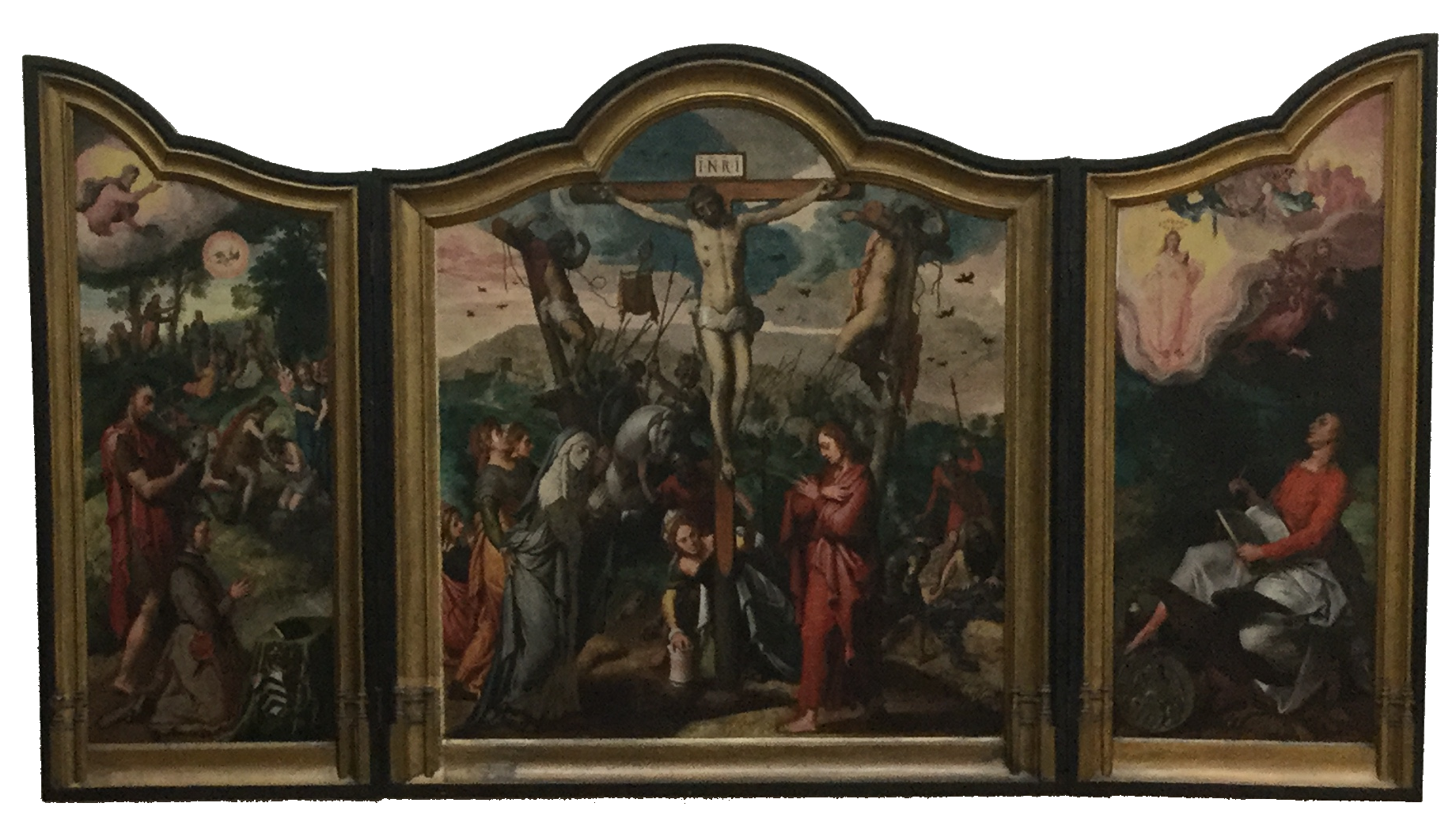
Jan van der Biest Triptych by Pieter Aertsen. Early 16th century

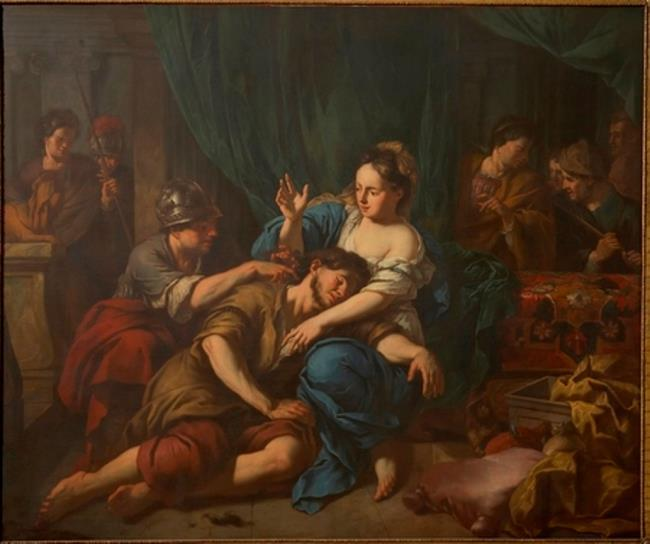
Samson and Delilah by Jan Voorhout. Late 17th century

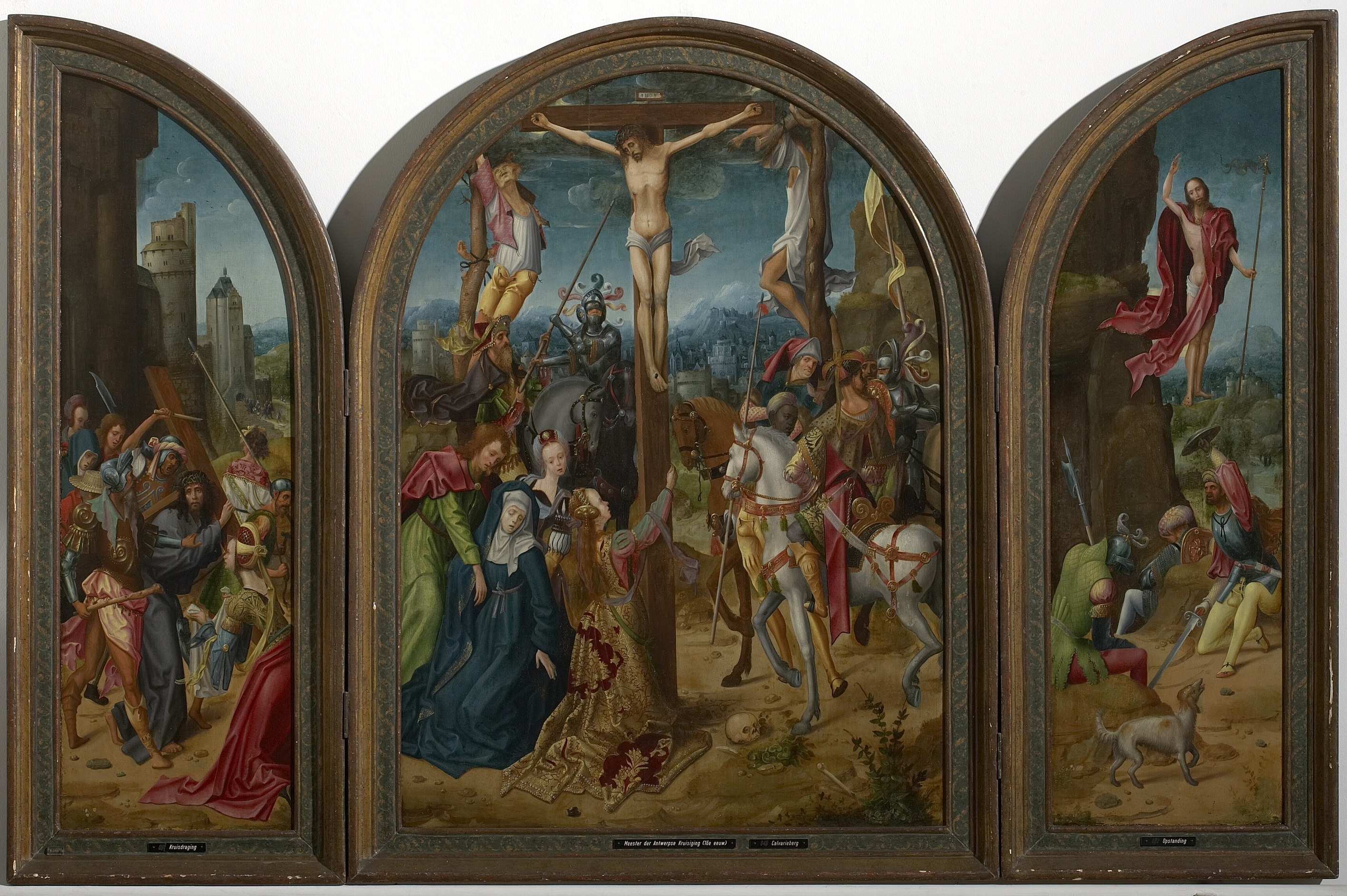
Triptych of the crucifixion by Adriaen van Overbeke. Early 16th century

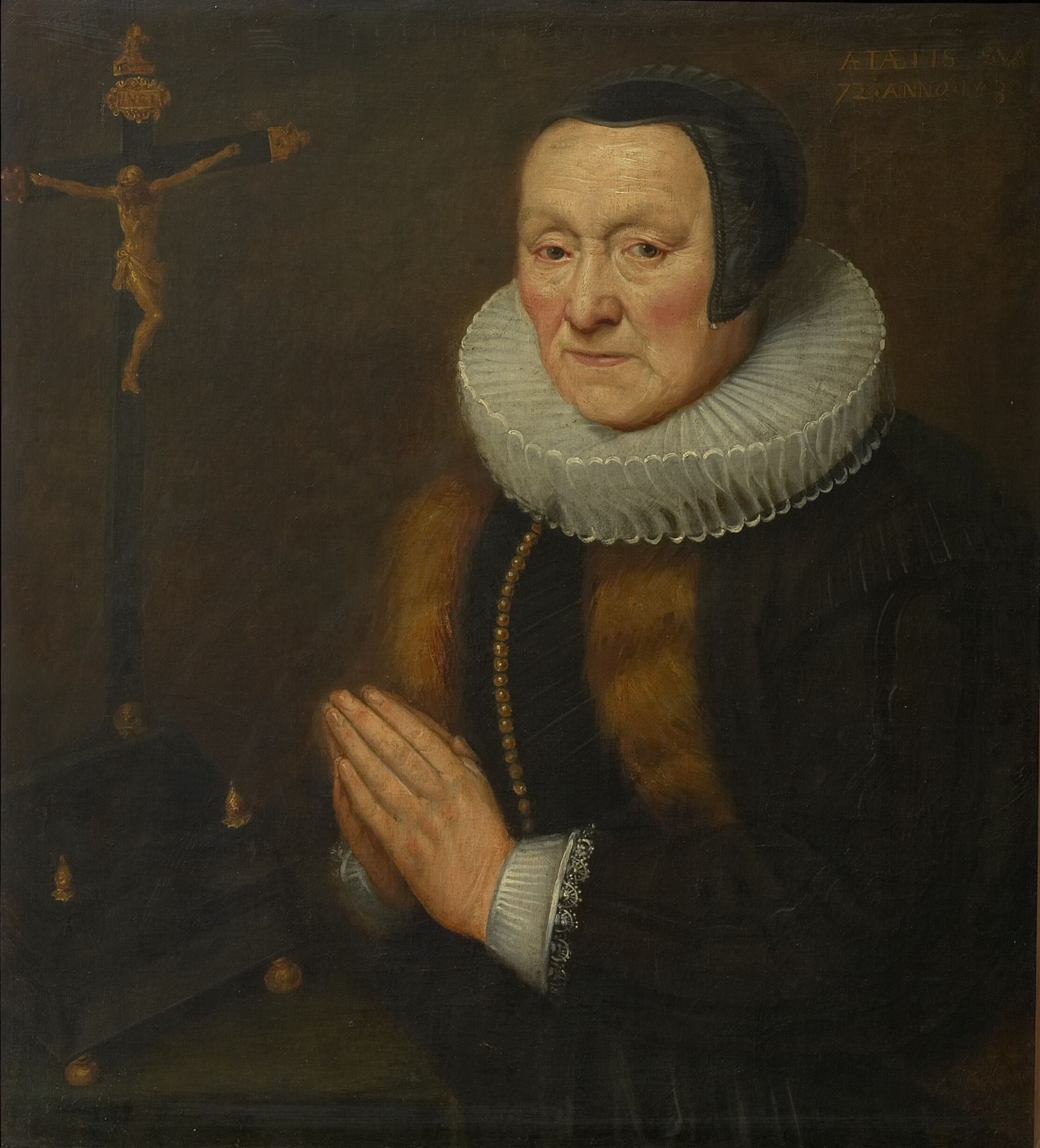
Portrait of Elisabeth Keyzers near a crucifix attributed to Cornelis de Vos. ca. 1632

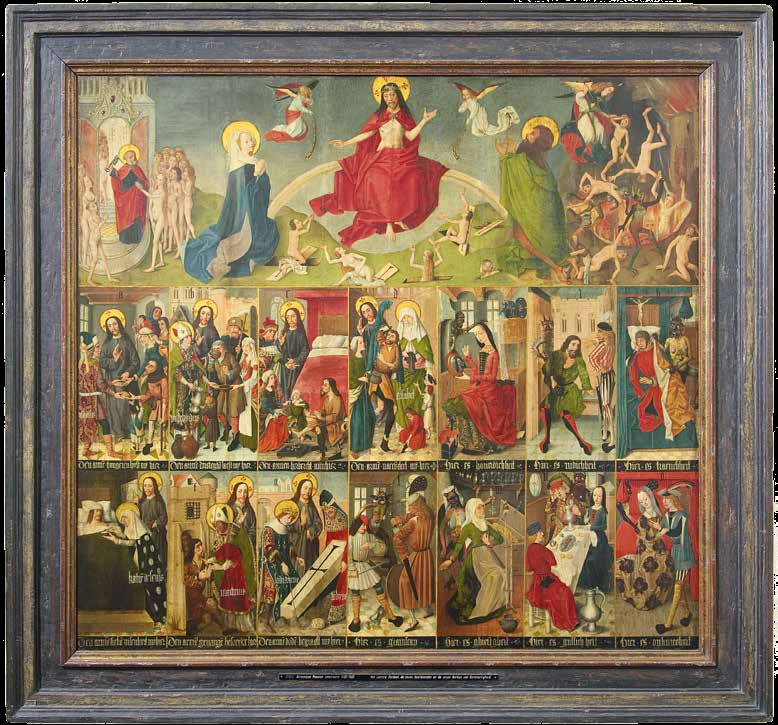
The Last Judgement, the Seven Acts of Mercy and the Seven Deadly Sins by Unknown Master. c. 1490

== Bibliography ==
- Visitor Guide- Maidens' House Museum (PDF). Antwerp, Belgium: Falke Meyers. 2007. pp. 1–35.
- Verhelst, Dirk (1996). Tot eerlick onderhoudt van meyskens cleene. Geschiedenis van het Maagdenhuis van Antwerpen. Antwerp, Belgium: OCMW Antwerpen.
- Huet, Leen; Grieten, Jan (2010). Nicolaas Rockox. Antwerp, Belgium: Meulenhoff.
- "About the Rich and the Poor".
