= Sebastiaen van den Eynde =

Flemish sculptor

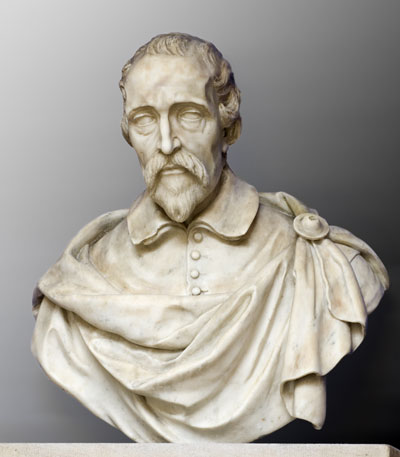
Bust of Cornelis II Landschot

Sebastiaen van den Eynden (Antwerp, baptized 20 June 1624 - Antwerp, before 1693) was a Flemish sculptor. He is mainly known for his religious sculptures and church furniture although he also worked on some secular projects. He was a member of the van den Eynde family of artists and merchants.

== Life ==
Sebastiaen van den Eynde was born in Antwerp where he was baptized on 20 June 1624. Van den Eynde was born into a renowned family of artists, one of the top families of sculptors in Antwerp. The Van den Eynde were part of the informal Quellinus-Verbrugghen-Willemsens-Scheemaeckers-Van den Eynde association, which turned the sculpture market of Antwerp into one of monopoly. The extensive collaboration between the workshops of the aforementioned families in the late 17th century may be the most important factor to account for the intricate "unity of style and approaches that have made disentangling of hands particularly difficult for art historians."

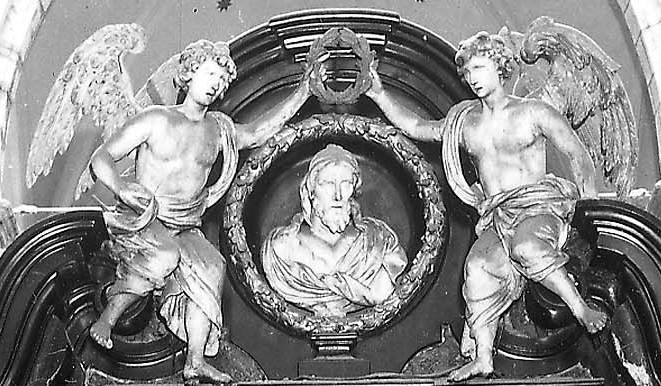
Sculpture above a rood screen in St. James' Church, Antwerp

He was the son of Cornelis, an architect and merchant. He was the brother of Jan van den Eynde II and the nephew of Huibrecht van den Eynde, both renowned artists. Sebastiaen became master of the Guild of Saint Luke in the Guild year 1661–1662. Sebastiaen is not mentioned as the son of a master of the Guild in any record. He was on very good terms with his brother Jan. In a common will dated 1680, they made each other their legatee and stressed their common interest in architecture, sculpture and commerce. The brothers were involved in many joint business transactions such as real estate dealings. They both acted as joint guardians of their nephew Cornelis de Wilde.

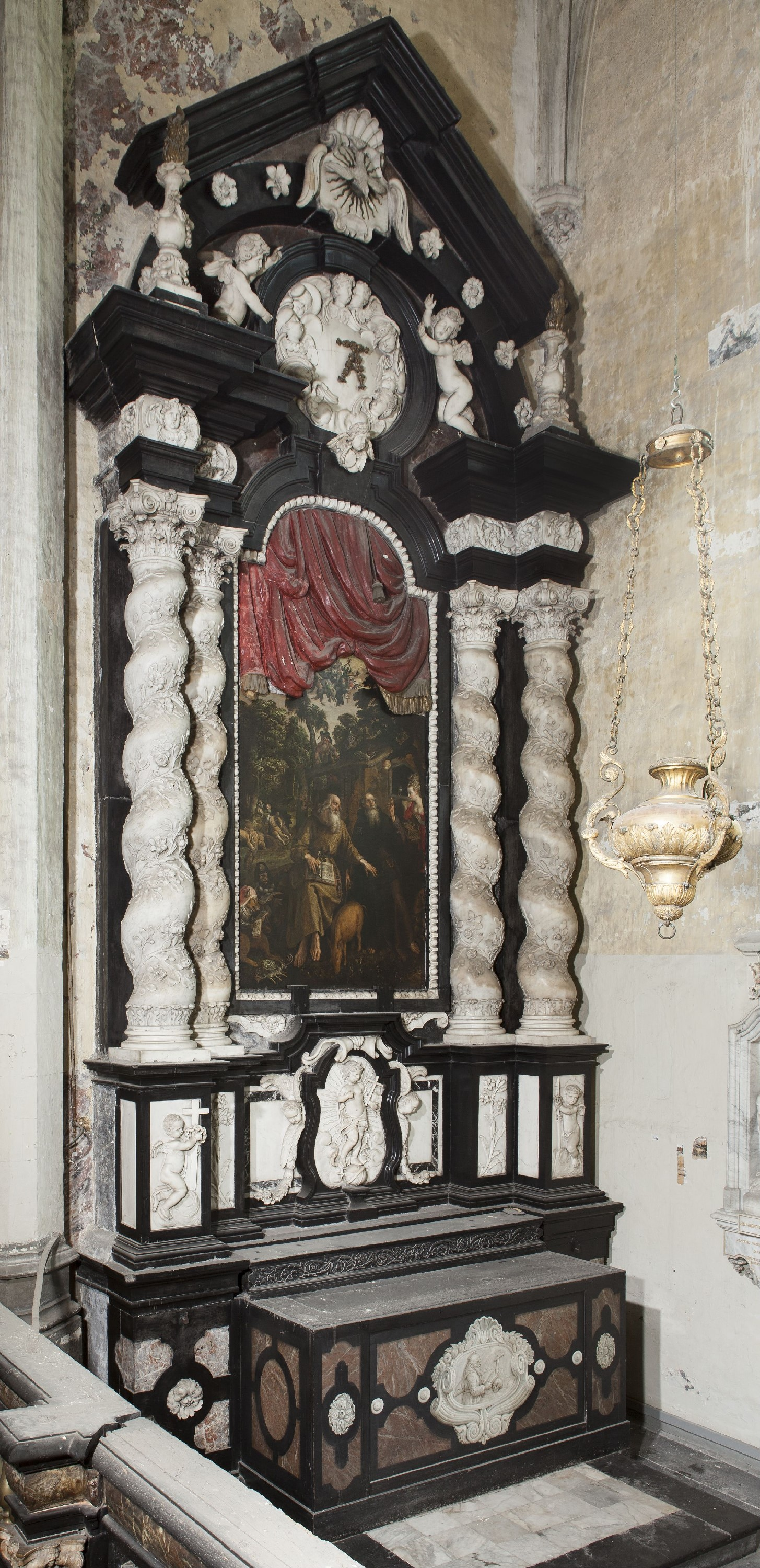
Saint Anthony Abbot altar, St. James' Church, Antwerp

He was a pupil of Sebastiaen de Neve until 1648. As a young man, Sebastiaen took a trip to Italy, spending some time in Rome. He returned to Antwerp in 1656. This long absence from his hometown may account for why he only became a master at the Guild of Antwerp when he was already 37 years old.

He had various dealings with the Antwerp animal painter Nicasius Bernaerts, who lived in Paris. On 4 September he testified he was an agent of Bernaerts. On 2 September 1672, he declared he was authorized by Bernaerts to collect debts at Paris-le-Châtelet.

His pupils included Antoni Stevens, Jan van Bredael and Anthony Stijnen.

== Work ==
He is mainly known for his religious sculptures and church furniture although he also worked on some secular projects. In 1656, he made a bust of Cornelis Landschot, a businessman and philanthropist from Antwerp. The sculpture, in the Maagdenhuis Museum, used to stand above the entrance to the chapel on the Falconrui. The bust illustrates the profound influence that contemporary Italian sculpture, in which the expatriate Brussels artist François Duquesnoy also played a leading role, exerted on portraiture in Flanders. Van den Eynde likely studied the work of his Italian predecessors during his study trip in Italy.

Van den Eynde produced several sculptured pieces of furniture for Antwerp's churches. These include an altar rail in black basanite with balusters and caryatids in white marble made in 1653 for the St. James' Church, after a design by Huibrecht van den Eynde. Van den Eynde produced the Carpenter's altar for the latter church, which has been dated to shortly after when he became a master in 1661/1662.

In the St. James' Church there are two intricate rood screens sculpted by van den Eynde, both with pieces of marble sculpture on top of them. They probably date to around 1665.
