= Bust of Cornelis II Landschot =

Coordinates: 51.214390°N 4.405730°E

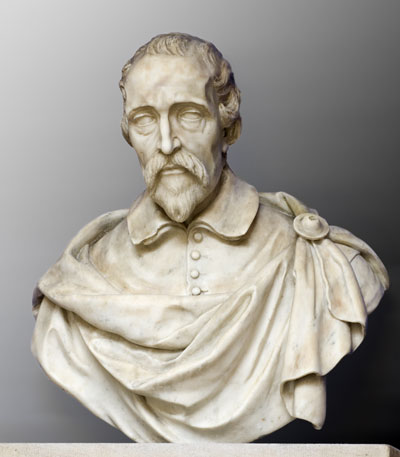
- Artist: Sebastiaen van den Eynde
- Year: 1656
- Type: Sculpture
- Medium: Marble
- Subject: Cornelis II Landschot
- Dimensions: 83 cm × 73 cm (32.7 in × 28.7 in)
- Location: Maagdenhuis Museum; Antwerp

The Bust of Cornelis II Landschot is a marble portrait by Flemish sculptor Sebastiaen van den Eynde. It was executed around 1656. The subject of the sculpture is Cornelis II Landschot, a wealthy Flemish businessman and philanthropist. The sculpture, now in the Maagdenhuis Museum, originally adorned the chapel of the almshouse that Landschot had founded on Falconrui, a street in Antwerp.

== Composition ==
The bust exemplifies the deep influence of Italian sculpture on sculpted portraiture in the Netherlands. Van den Eynde himself traveled to Italy, living in Rome in the time of François Duquesnoy and Gian Lorenzo Bernini.

According to some sources, Van den Eynde returned to Antwerp in 1656.

Cornelis Landschot is depicted in a simple shirt with a square collar, over which a piece of cloth is draped. The latter is fastened to the left shoulder by a round pin, fully covering the lower part of the bust, with the overlapping, overhanging (but not dynamic, over-elaborate or billowing) folds of the drapery acting as the bust's lower limit. Both the cloak and the pin are strongly reminiscent of Italian, Roman inspired cinquecento, thus of pre Mannerist and pre Baroque sculpture. Van den Eynde might have studied the work of his Italian predecessors with his own eyes during the study trip he took just before this assignment.

In terms of quality of execution, this sculpture is not inferior to its Italian counterparts. The client is accurately and naturalistically portrayed via an extremely refined surface treatment of the physiognomy. It was depicted slightly bent over, probably in order to allow the churchgoers leaving the chapel to better look at the bust from their frog's eye view.

== Sources ==
- "Flemish sculpture: Art and manufacture c.1600-1750" (PDF). University College London: 19, 28, 33, 50, 66, 90, 93, 185, 192, 193, 196, 199, 205, 211, 251, 252, 258, 271. 2008.
- KMSKA (2007). Heads on Shoulders. Snoeck via University of Michigan. p. 126. ISBN 9789053496992.
- "Sebastiaen van den Eynde". RKD.
- "Portrait of Cornelis II Landschot (circa 1656)". vlaamsekunstcollectie.be.
- Visitor Guide- Maidens' House Museum (PDF). Antwerp, Belgium: Falke Meyers. 2007. pp. 64–65.
