= Huibrecht van den Eynde =

Flemish sculptor

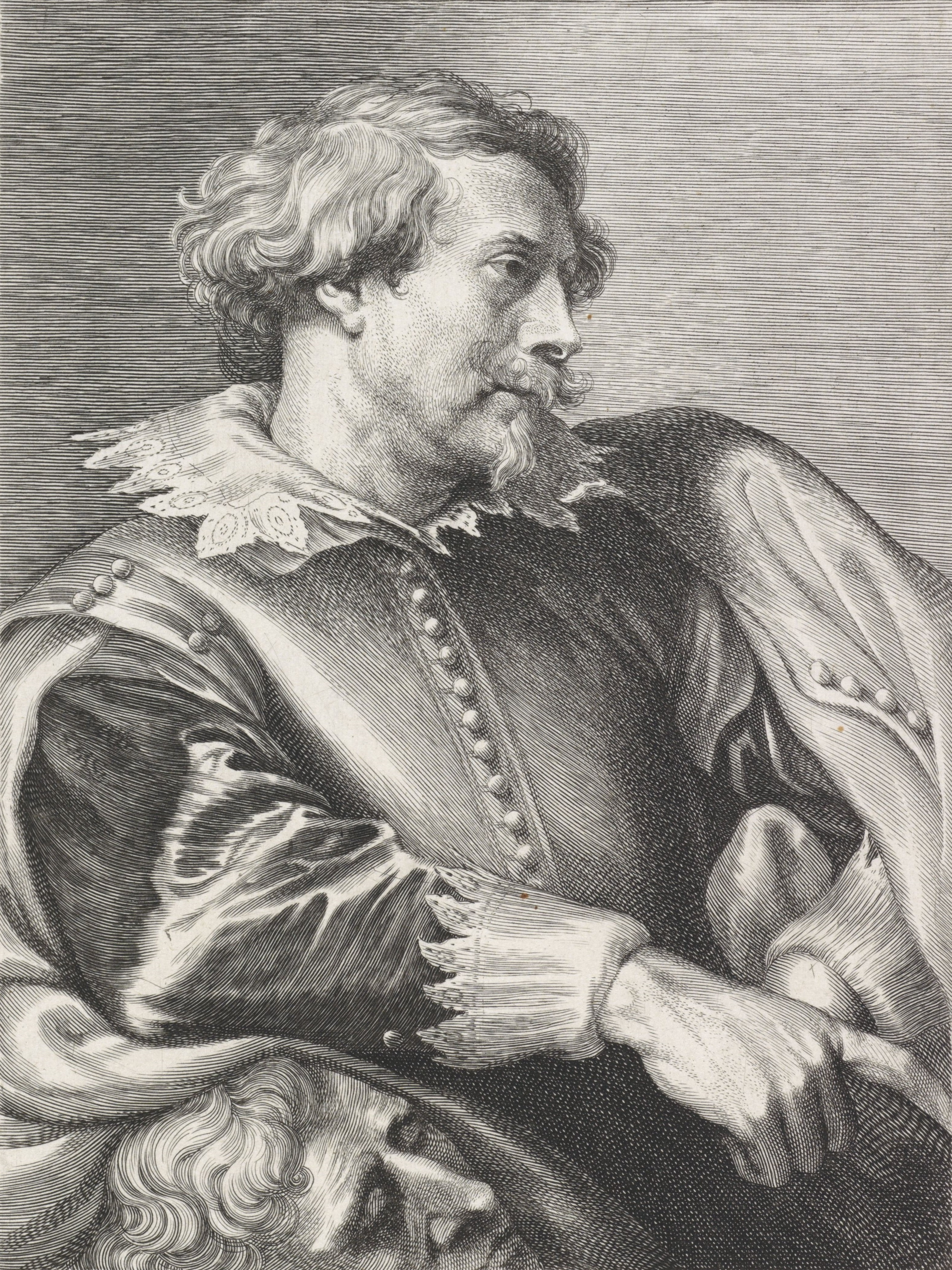
- Huibrecht van den Eynde, engraving after a design by Anthony van Dyck
- Born: November 11, 1594; Antwerp
- Died: September 18, 1662 (aged 67); Antwerp
- Known for: sculpture
- Movement: Flemish Baroque, High Baroque

Huibrecht, Hubrecht, Hubertus or Hubert van den Eynde (11 October 1593 – 18 September 1662) was a Flemish sculptor. He is mainly known for his religious sculptures and church furniture although he also worked on some secular projects. He was the first prominent sculptor of the van den Eynde family of artists and merchants. In the early 17th century, van den Eynde was one of the leading Flemish sculptors who rejected contrived Mannerist formulae in favour of greater realism. His work shows a development from the early Baroque to the high Baroque. His late style is characterized by a penchant for movement and dashing draperies.

Among his works are his contributions to the monumental Waterpoort (in Antwerp), a high altar in black and white marble and alabaster in the Church of Our Lady of Dendermonde; and the Rubenesque marble statues of Gideon and Joshua in the Antwerp Cathedral.

== Life and Family ==
Van den Eynde was born into the van den Eynde family of Antwerp, which produced a number of artists and merchants. The family became one of the most prominent families of sculptors in Antwerp in the late 17th century. The van Eynde workshop, together with the workshops of the Quellinus, Verbrugghen, Willemssens and Scheemaeckers families controlled the sculpture market in 17th century Antwerp. The extensive collaboration between these workshops may have been the most important factor to account for the intricate "unity of style and approaches that have made disentangling of hands particularly difficult for art historians." Hubert van den Eynde was the family's first notable sculptor.

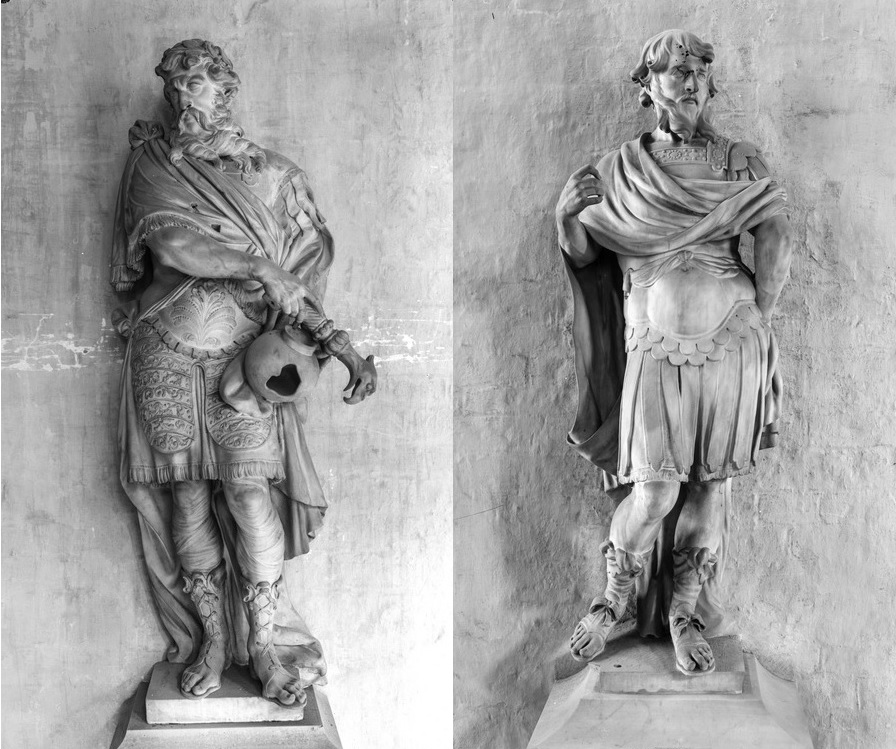
Gideon and Joshua, Antwerp Cathedral

He trained with an unknown master. He was registered as a master of the Antwerp Guild of Saint Luke in September 1620. He became in May 1622 a member of the Sodality of the Unmarried Men of Age ('Sodaliteit van de bejaerde jongmans'), a fraternity for bachelors established by the Jesuit order. He was also a member of the guild of masons of Antwerp. He taught his cousin Sebastiaen van den Eynde, his nephew Sebastiaen de Neve and his son Norbertus. Other pupils included Pauwels Creuls (between 18 September 1631 and 18 September 1632), Peeter Jansen (between 18 September 1636 and 18 September 1637), Peeter Creun and Jacques Jehan.

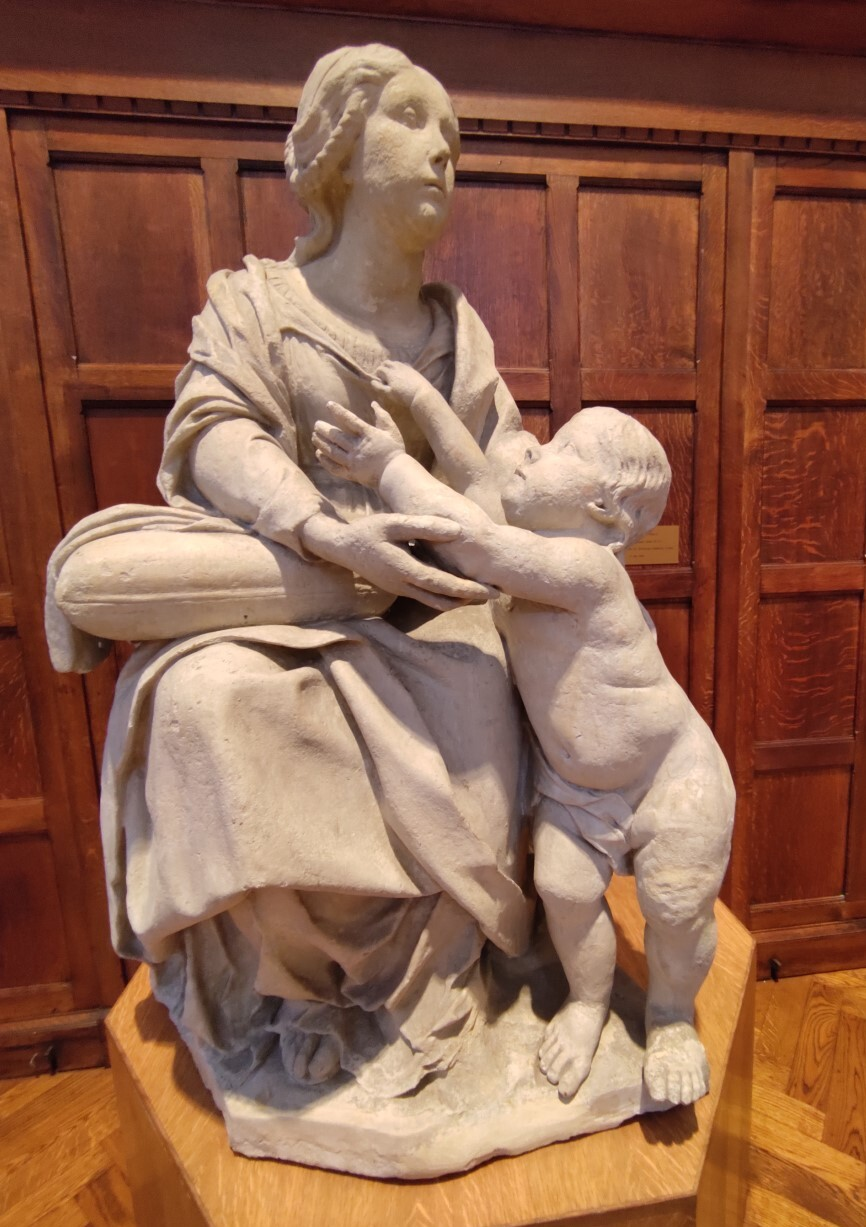
The Virgin Mary with the Child Jesus, Maagdenhuis Museum

Van den Eynde married twice. He was first married to Elizabeth Schorkens. His first wife died in September 1623 or 1624. He later married a second time, to Elizabeth van Breen, with whom he had one son, Norbertus (or Norbert). In a testament of van den Eynden and his second wife dated 24 February 1656 the sole heir is Norbertus making it unlikely that Sebastiaen van den Eynde was his son as sometimes has been presumed.

Van den Eynde was included by van Dyck as one of the hundred artists represented in his Iconography, a collection of portraits of eminent contemporaries created under van Dyck's supervision after van Dyck's designs. Van den Eynde is one of only three sculptors to appear in this collection. The others were Hans van Mildert and Andries de Nole. This shows he was held in high esteem in his time.

== Work ==
He is mainly known for his religious sculptures and church furniture although he also worked on some secular projects. The sculptures of van den Eynde show the artist's adherence to the High Baroque style of Rubens, the artist who exerted an important influence over van den Eynde and his pupils. His work shows a development from the early Baroque to the High baroque. His late style is characterized by a penchant for movement and dashing draperies.

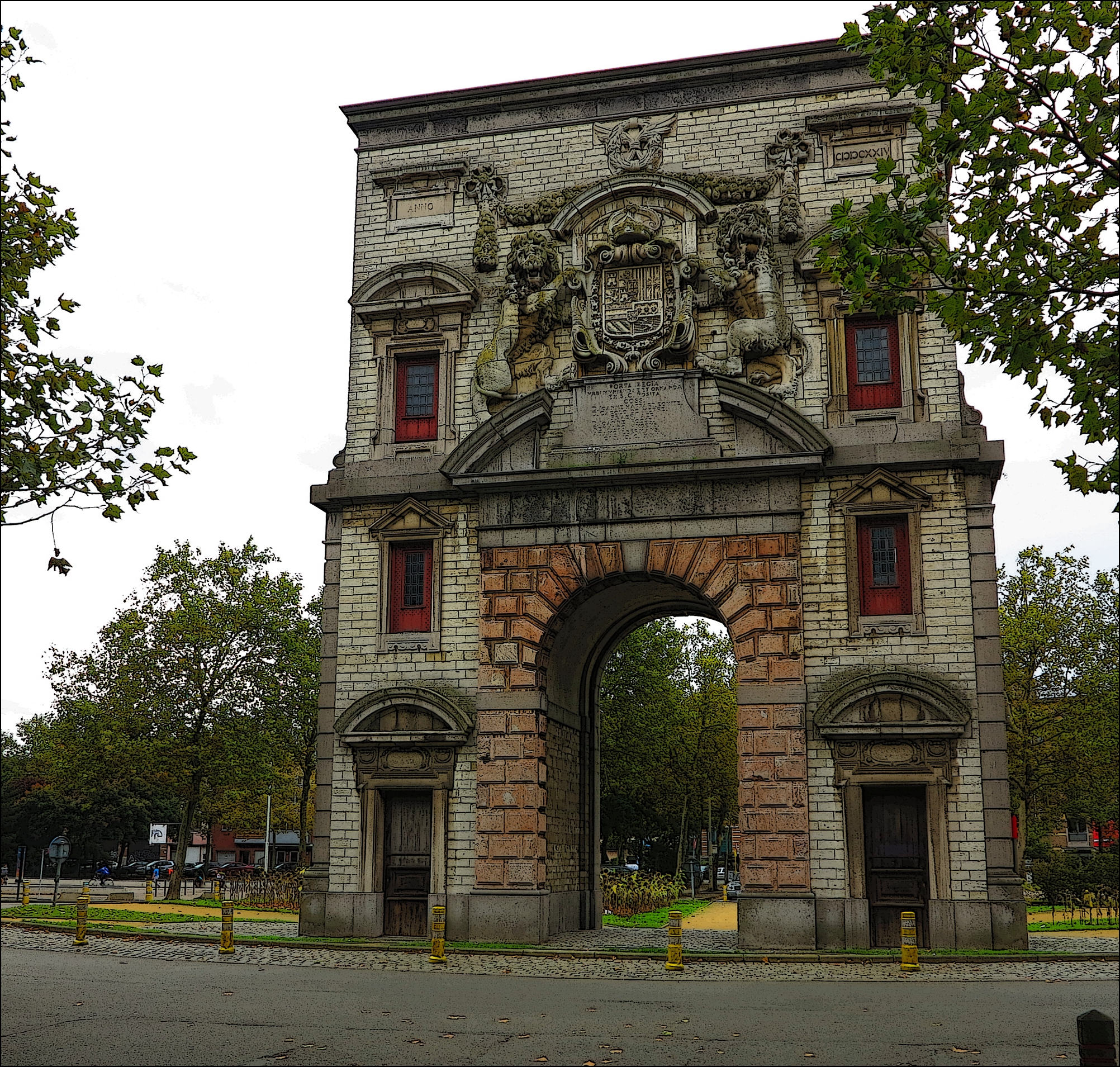
Waterpoort, Antwerp

A few years after becoming a master, van den Eynde was commissioned to work on the Waterpoort in Antwerp, a triumphal arch or gate in honor of Charles V. The commission was completed by van den Eynde in collaboration with Hans van Mildert, a regular collaborator of Rubens. The design of the gate has been attributed to Rubens. The Waterpoort, or Porta Regia, was erected in 1624. In 1883–84, due to works to the quays on the Scheldt, the gate was moved to the Sint-Jansvliet. In 1933, due to the works to the Scheldt tunnel, it was dismantled again and re-erected in 1936 on the Gillisplaats.

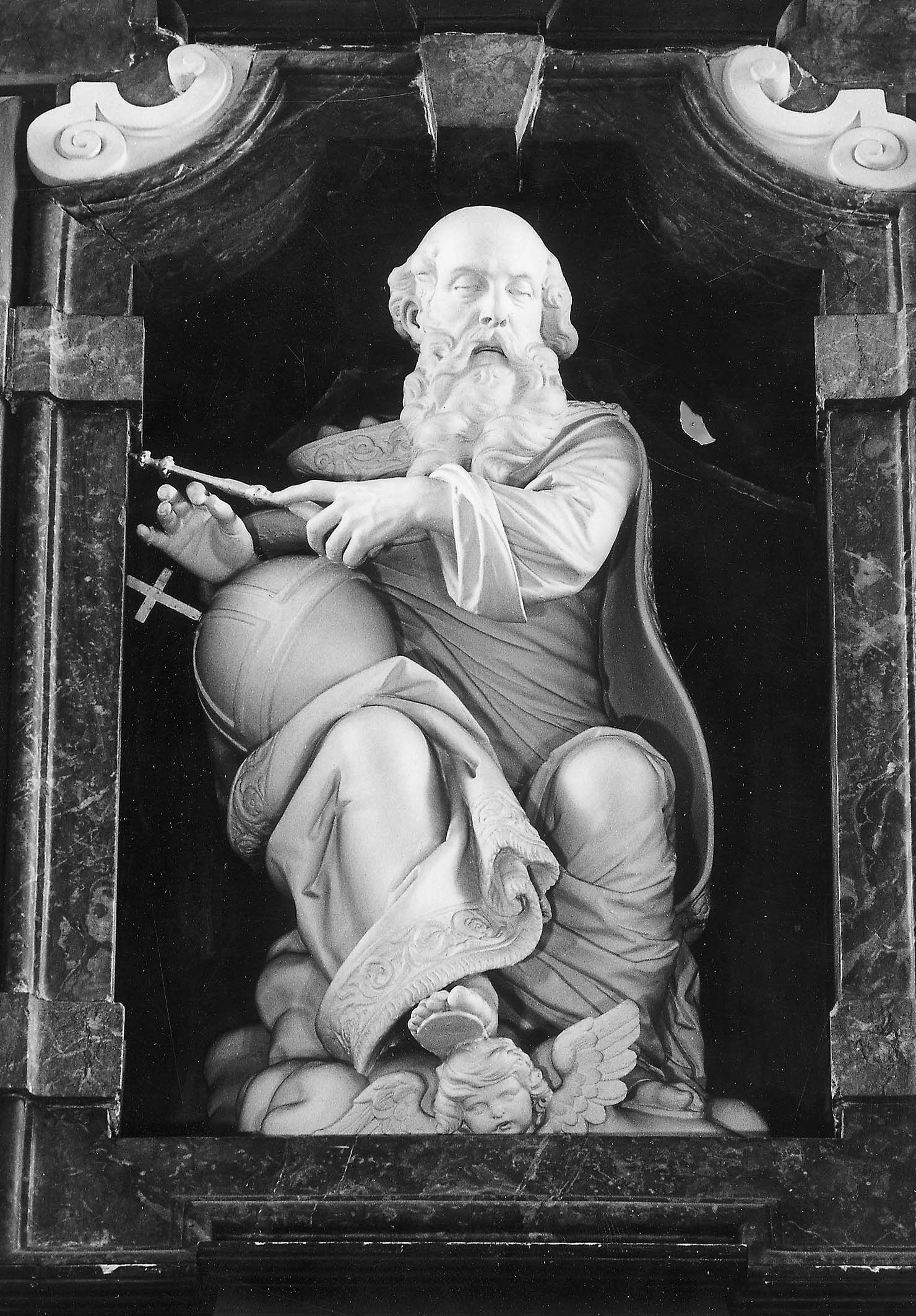
God the Father, Creator of the Universe, Onze-Lieve-Vrouw van de Goede Wilkerk, Duffel

During the 1630s, van den Eynde received more civic commissions, including for sculptural decorations on the Vierschaar (the tribunal) and the Stock Exchange in Antwerp.

On 8 October 1629, he started working on the high altar of the Church of Our Lady of Dendermonde. The altar was sculpted from black and white marble and alabaster, and completed within a year.

In the early 1630s, van den Eynde executed a monumental Virgin, which stood near the Antwerp City Hall. In 1635, he collaborated on the Meirbrugge Crucifixion (now in the Antwerp Cathedral).

The following year, in 1636, he produced a beautiful sandstone sculpture of the Virgin with the Child Jesus. This sculpture used to stand in the Maagdenhuis Museum's garden, but it was later moved inside and a copy, better able to withstand harsh weather conditions, was placed outside.

In 1640, van den Eynde worked on altars in the church of Averbode Abbey. In 1648, he realized a side altar of the St. Rumbold Church in Steenokkerzeel. In 1653 he made the high altar for the Onze-Lieve-Vrouw van de Goede Wil church of Duffel in collaboration with his son Norbertus.

Van den Eynde's most remarkable works are his religious sculptures which he created for Antwerp's churches and, in particular, its Cathedral. In the 1650s, he collaborated with Artus Quellinus II, producing a set of sculptures for the Antwerp Cathedral. Of these sculptures, today only two marble statues of Gideon and Joshua remain in situ. The two statues used to flank a marble of Saint Michael, also a collaborative effort of Quellinus and van de Eynde, which stood over the Schermersaltaar (fencers' altar). The fencers' altar of Saint Michael was placed against the southern mother pillar of the central nave. Today, the two statues are located in the back of the nave, standing against the buttresses of the towers.
