= Lodewijk Willemsens =

Flemish sculptor (1630–1702)

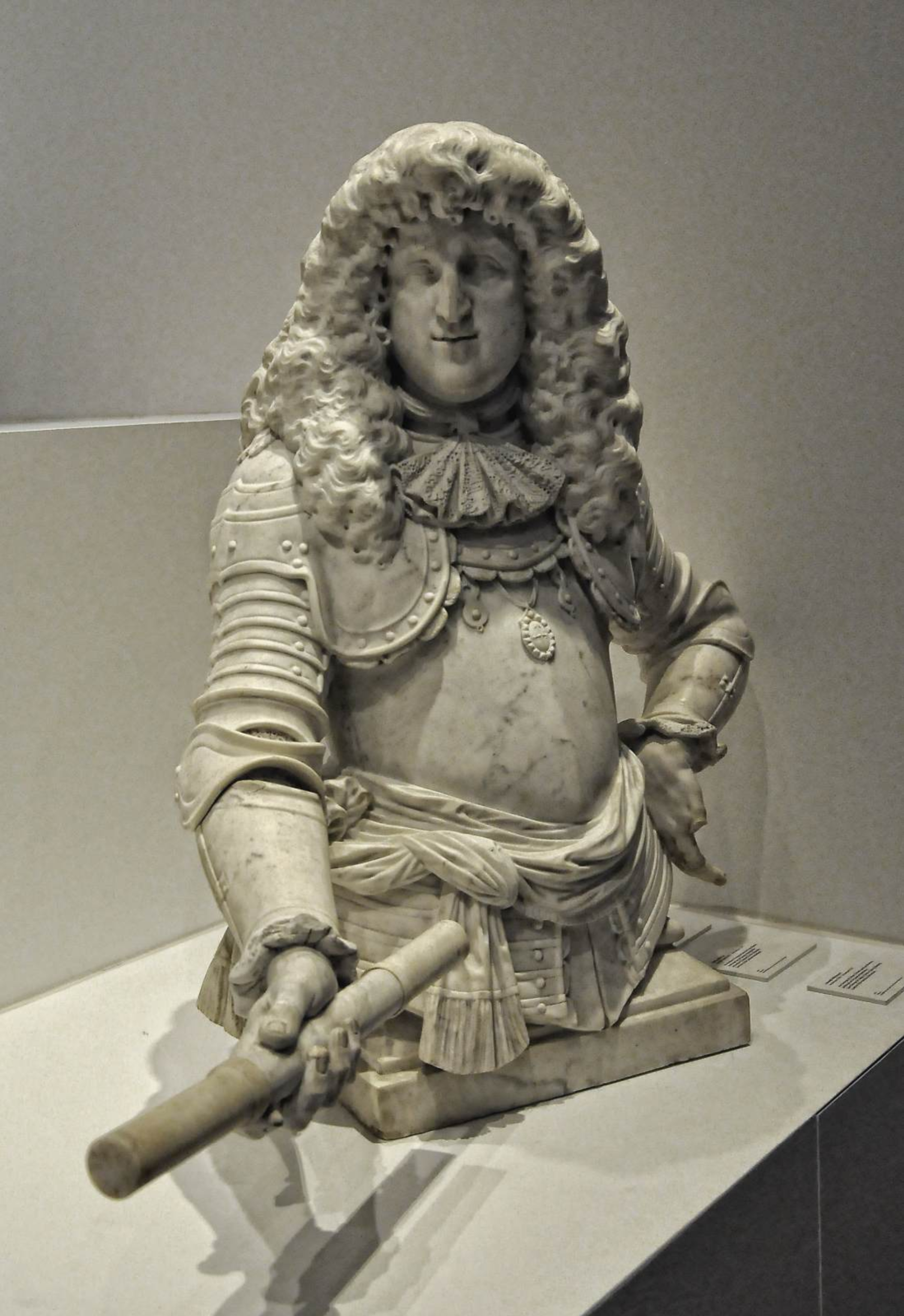
Juan Domingo de Zuñiga y Fonseca

Lodewijk Willemsens or Ludovicus Willemsens (1630–1702) was a Flemish sculptor from Antwerp. His works comprise mostly sculptured church furniture, and to a lesser extent, individual sculptures, both portrait busts as well as statues of saints for churches.

== Life ==
Willemsens was born in Antwerp where he was baptised in the cathedral on 7 October 1630. His parents were Michiel Willemsens and Lucia Keersmaeckers. From his father's first marriage with Elisabetha de Bruichel he had a half-brother, the painter Abraham Willemsens (1614 - 1672). He had also two sisters and a brother called Anton or Anthonis who trained as a painter and was registered as a master in the Antwerp Guild of Saint Luke in the guild year 1649–1650.

It is generally believed that he was a pupil of Artus Quellinus the Elder although there is no documentary evidence proving such an apprenticeship. The reason why there is no record of his apprenticeship might have to do with the fact that, as a court sculptor, Quellinus was not required to be a member of the Antwerp Guild of Saint Luke and so did not have to register his pupils with the Guild. Quellinus was the leading Flemish sculptor whose Baroque style had a major influence on the development of sculpture in Northern Europe. Quellinus worked for a long time in Amsterdam, where he supervised the sculptural decorations program for the new city hall.

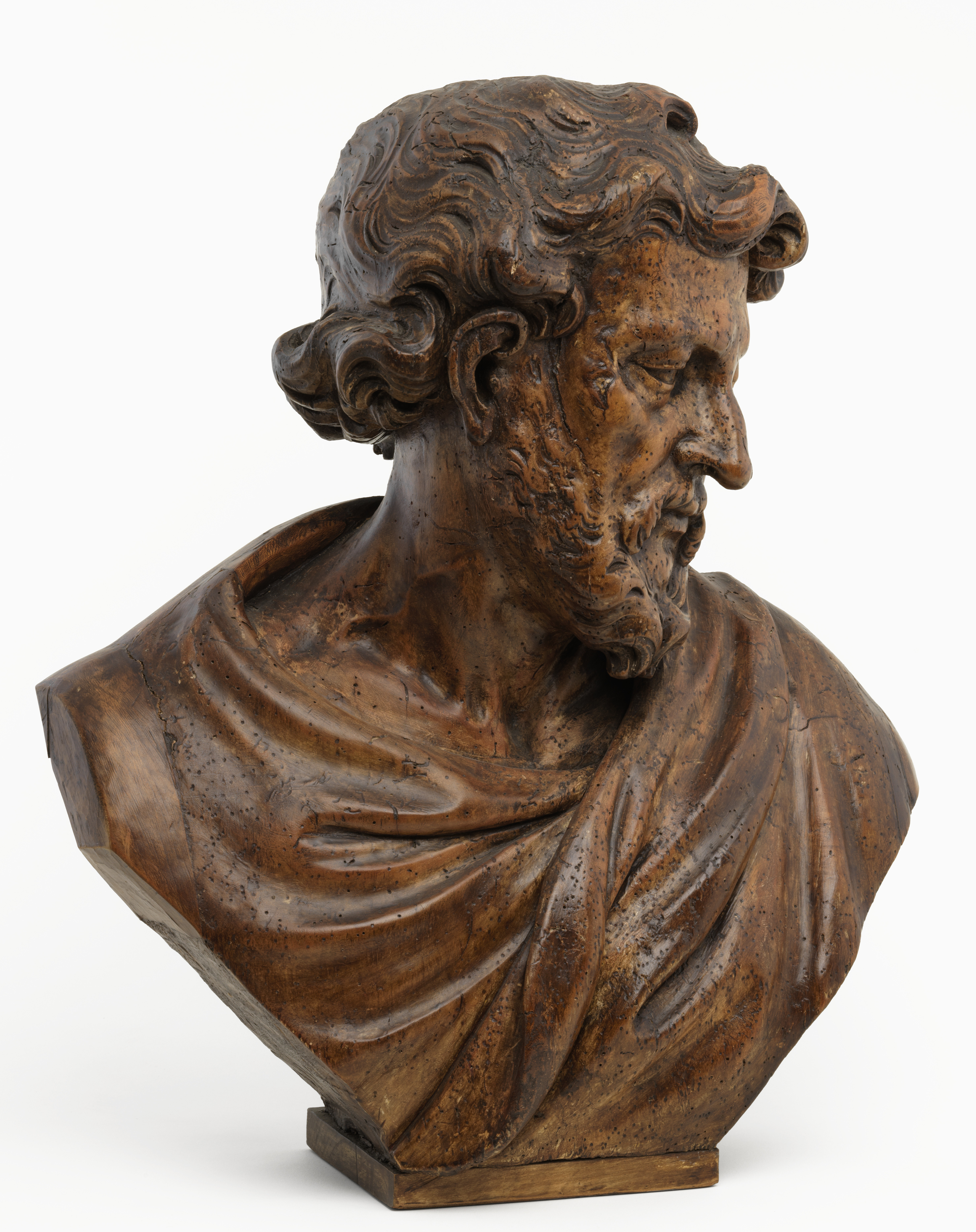
Bust of the Apostle Judas Thaddeus

Lodewijk is thought to have helped Quellinus in Amsterdam as a journeyman in his service and this is likely why he delayed his admission as a master in the Antwerp Guild of Saint Luke. Quellinus may have assisted him also in obtaining commissions including those for several altars for the Paderborn Cathedral which he completed between 1655 and 1661. Willemsens was first recorded in Paderborn on 26 February 1655, as working in the service of Dietrich Adolph, the Prince Bishop of Paderborn. His brother Anton worked alongside him on the decorations of Paderborn Cathedral for which Anton painted six altarpieces. Lodewijk made the high altar in the Paderborn Cathedral in a grand Baroque style reminiscent of the high altar in the Antwerp Jesuit church, which had been designed by Rubens and executed by Johannes van Mildert. The defining feature of the Paderborn high altar were the four winding columns that framed the altar. He is believed to have stayed in Paderborn until 1661, the year in which he became a master in the Antwerp guild. Through their work in Paderborn, the Willemsens brother gave an important impetus to the spread of Baroque art in Northern Germany.

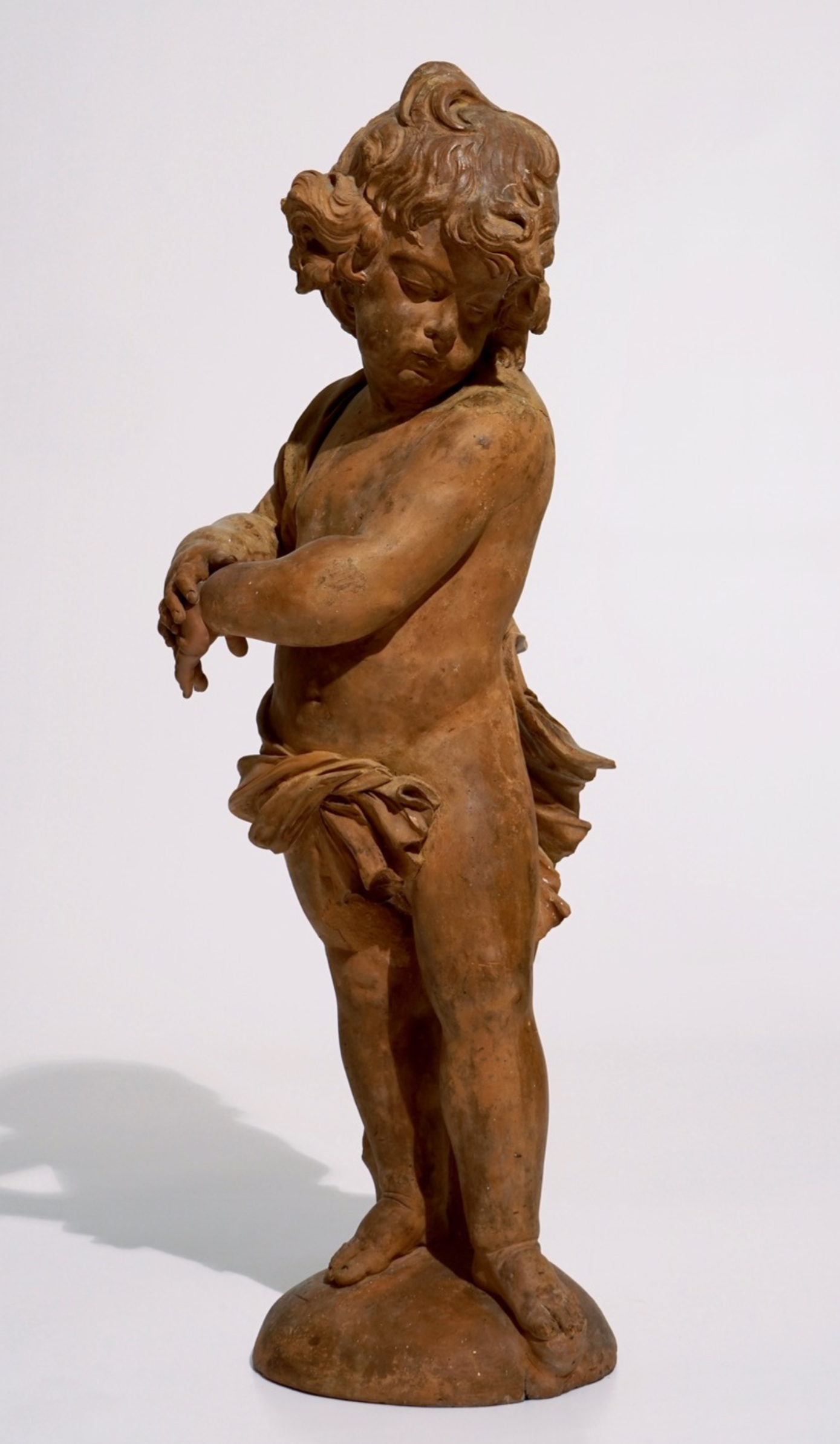
Large terracotta model of a putto

He married Anna Corvers in Antwerp's Saint George ' s Church on 27 April 1671. His wife died on 8 January 1691. He received Jacobus van der Biest as his pupil in the guild year 1672–1673, Guiliam Schobbens in the guild year 1687–1688 and Pierre-Denis Plumier in the guild year 1698–1699. The Paderborner sculptor Johann Mauritz Gröninger may also have trained with him.

He died in Antwerp where he was buried on 12 October 1702 in the Saint George ' s Church next to his wife. A Joanna Maria Willemsens was buried with them in 1709. She may have been a daughter or close relative

== Work ==
He created mainly sculptured church furniture, and to a lesser extent individual sculptures, both portrait busts as well as statues of saints for churches. His altars can be found in Antwerp, Paderborn, and Tournai. He worked in many materials including wood, marble and terracotta.

His style is characterized by a sensual expressiveness which is close to Van Dyck's emotionally charged treatment of religious subjects. This is evidenced in the symbolic personifications of Catholic doctrine decorating the pulpit of the Church of St James in Antwerp, and in the figures of saints in the choir stalls of the former Cistercian Abbey of St. Bernard in Hemiksem.

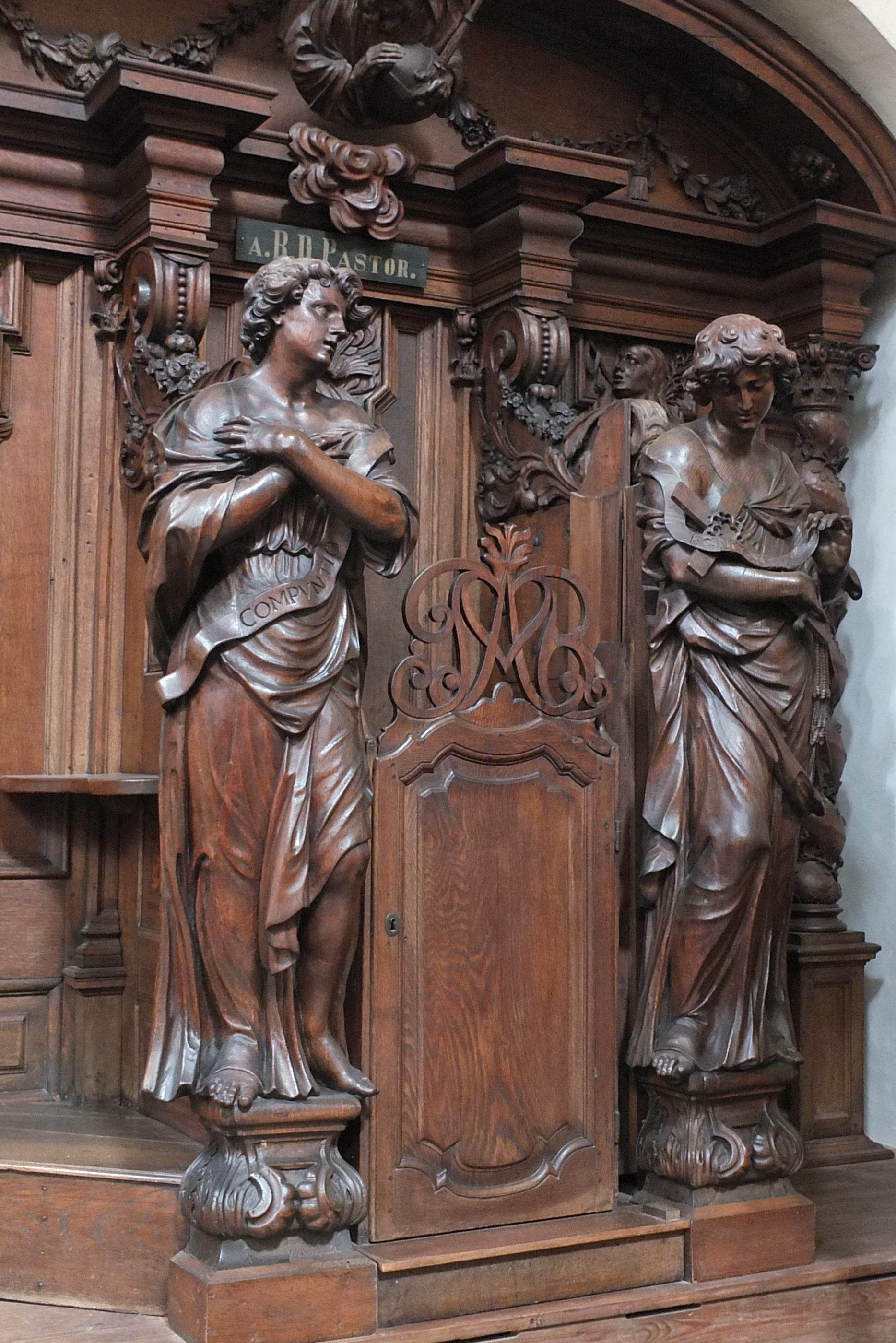
Confessional, St Andrew's Church Antwerp

He was known in his time for his ability to sculpt small children, in particular in marble. His skill in this regard was described as being equal to that of the Flemish sculptor François Duquesnoy who was famous for his children's figures.

Willemsens collaborated with several major sculptors in Antwerp. He was initially a frequent collaborator of his presumed master Artus Quellinus the Elder, contributing in particular to the Amsterdam new City Hall decorations. In the second half of the 17th century a few large sculpture workshops in Antwerp came to dominate the market. They were the workshops of the families Quellinus, van den Eynde, Kerricx, Scheemaeckers and Verbrugghen with whom Willemsens also formed an informal partnership. The close links between these Antwerp workshops resulted in a very similar style of late Baroque sculpture, which has made it often difficult to identify which artist or workshop produced a particular work.

Willemsens collaborated between 1683 and 1688 with Norbert van den Eynde on an altarpiece dedicated to St Catherine for the oudekleerkopers guild in the cathedral of Antwerp. In 1690, he collaborated with Pieter Verbrugghen the Younger on two statues for the 1678 altarpiece of the Venerabelkapel in the St. James' Church in Antwerp.

His best known work is probably the bust of Juan Domingo de Zuñiga y Fonseca the Governor of the Habsburg Netherlands (exhibited at the Museum aan de Stroom in Antwerp but part of the collection of the Royal Museum of Fine Arts Antwerp). This bust was commissioned by the Guild of Saint Luke as a gift to the governor for his support in an eighteen-year long litigation between the Guild and the local guild of crossbowmen.
