= Johannes van Mildert =

Flemish sculptor

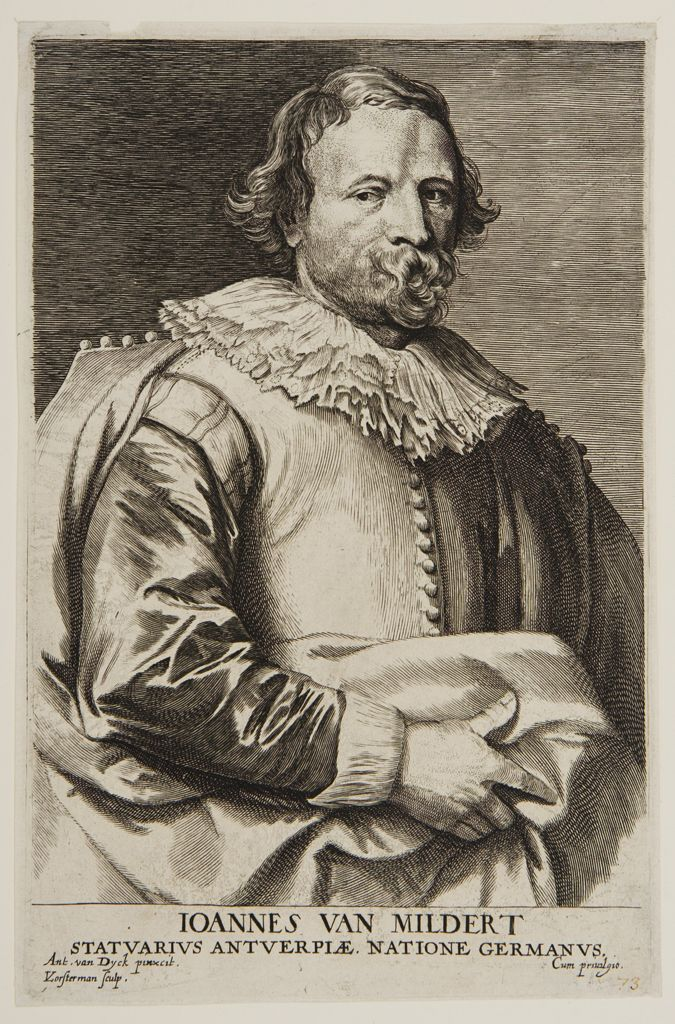
Portrait of Johannes van Mildert, engraved by Lucas Vorsterman after a design by Anthony van Dyck

Johannes van Mildert or Hans van Mildert (alternative names: Joannes van Mildert, Johannes Van Milder, and nickname den Duyts; 1588 in Königsberg – 1638 in Antwerp) was a Flemish sculptor, who is best known for his baroque sculptures found in many Belgian and Dutch churches. Van Mildert played an important role in the development of the design of Flemish Baroque religious furniture.

== Life ==
Johannes van Mildert was the son of the Antwerp painter Anthoon van Mildert (d. 1597) who had migrated to Königsberg. He was probably the pupil of Willem van den Blocke, another Fleming who had settled in Königsberg.

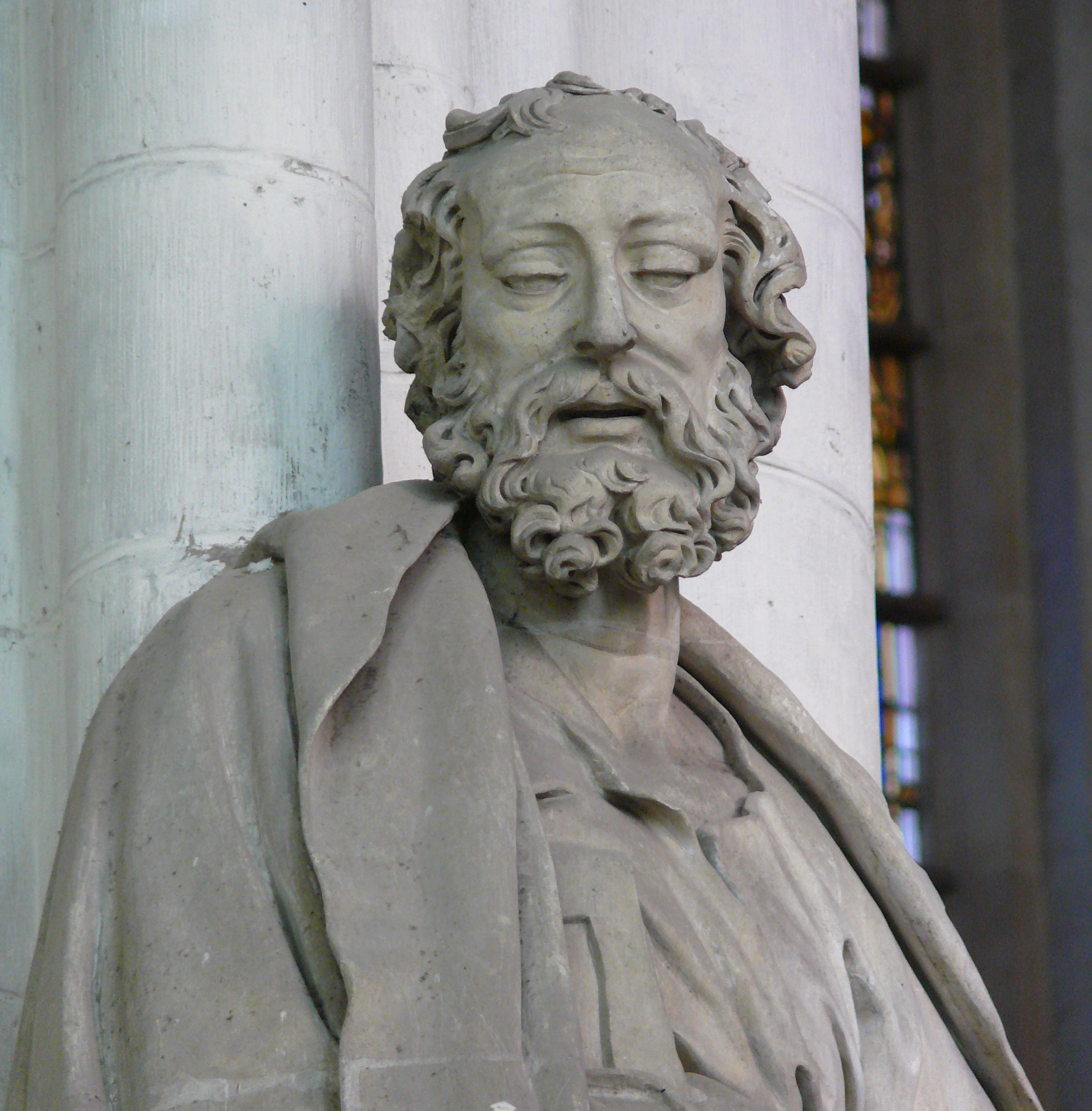
St Peter in the St. Rumbold's Cathedral in Mechelen

After the death of his father he went to Antwerp, where he became a master in the Guild of Saint Luke in 1610. He possibly undertook a trip to Rome around 1608. It is believed that after 1620 he spent some time in Paris. He became a citizen of Antwerp in 1628. In Antwerp he became friends with Rubens who had a similar background as they were both Flemings who were born abroad and had returned to their home town.

When in 1633 Rubens was elected dean of the Antwerp Guild of Saint Luke he was allowed to leave the actual administration in the hands of van Mildert.

His nickname 'den Duyts', which means 'the German', refers to the fact that he was born and raised in Königsberg, which was then part of Germany. He was married to Elisabeth Waeyens and his son Cornelis van Mildert was also a sculptor and draughtsman. His daughter Elizabeth married the sculptor Gerard van Opstal. His son Cornelis and his son-in-law Gerard van Opstal completed some of the works left unfinished at the time of his death.

== Work ==
From about 1617 onwards van Mildert received multiple large commissions as a sculptor-architect and maker of small-scale architectural stone church furniture. He thus became the main competitor of the workshop of the brothers Hans and Robert Colyns the Nole that had dominated the Antwerp market from the beginning of the seventeenth century.

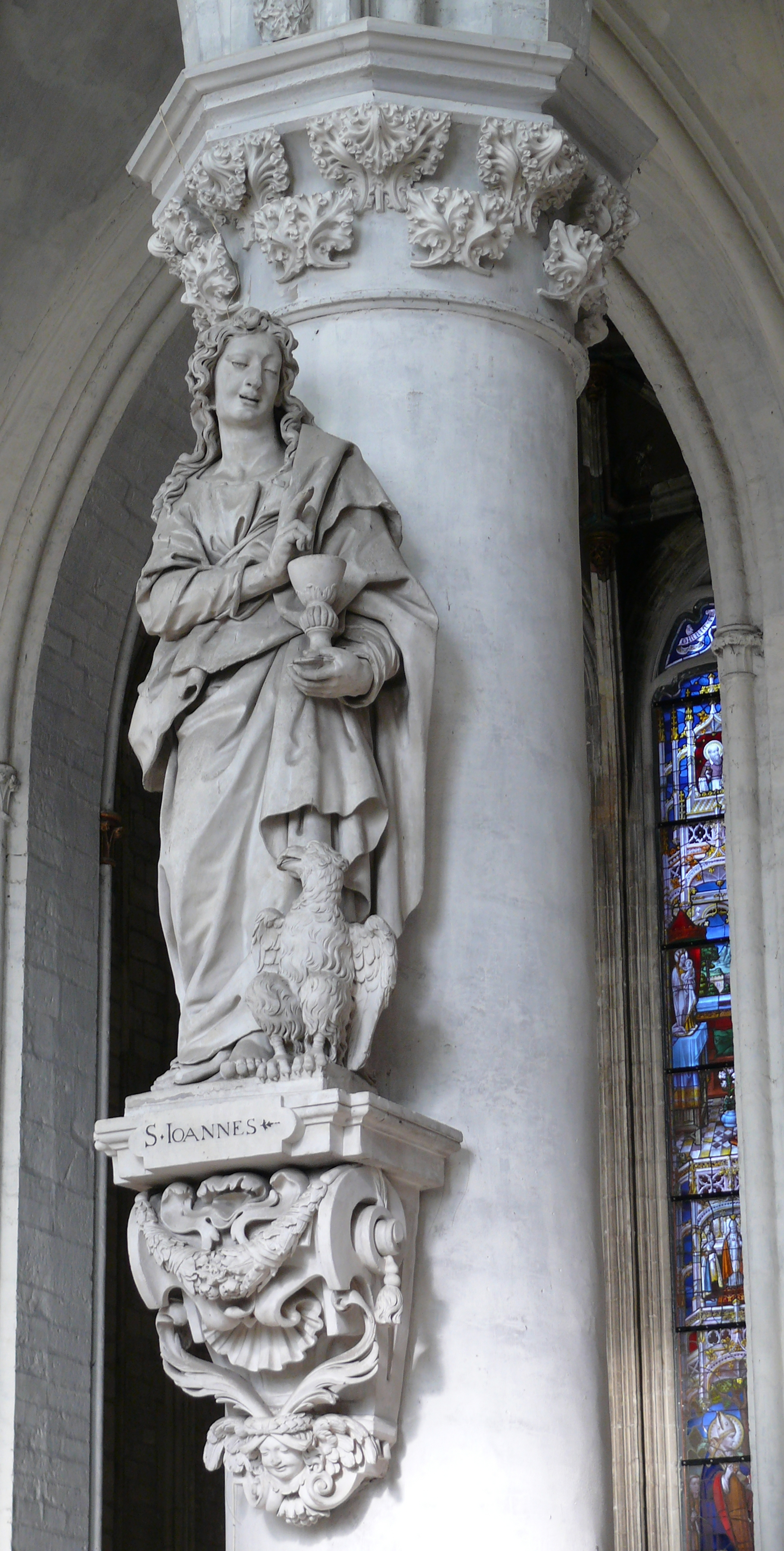
St John in the St. Rumbold's Cathedral in Mechelen

He initially worked in a mannerist style. The monumental alabaster mantelpiece which he made in 1618 for the wedding hall of the Antwerp City Hall followed the Mannerist style of Cornelis Floris de Vriendt and may have been based on a drawing of Floris. Around this time van Mildert started working in the Baroque style of his friend Rubens. In 1618 he executed a black and white marble altar made for the Chapel Church in Brussels based on a design by Rubens. This structure (now in Saint-Josse-ten-Noode) was the first stone altar in the shape of a porch in the Southern Netherlands. Rubens also commissioned van Mildert to make the famous separation wall with arches in Rubens’ residence in Antwerp. He further executed Rubens' design for the Waterpoort, a gate that was originally part of the Antwerp defence walls.

Despite the baroque nature of his architectural work, his figure sculpture did follow the non-dynamic forms of the Renaissance style. His image of Saint Gummarus for the baroque altar erected in 1620 in the St. Gummarus Church in Lier is heavy in proportions, unrealistic in detail and static in its pose. Later works such as the marble statue of the apostle Simon in 1638 in the St. Rumbold's Cathedral in Mechelen are, however, livelier and realistic. This is also true for sculptures made after designs by Rubens such as the image of St. Michael fighting with the devil, made for the church of the abbey of St. Michael in Antwerp and now in the St. Trudo Church in Zundert.

Van Mildert played an important role in the development of the design of Flemish Baroque religious furniture. In this area of Baroque sculpture in the Southern Netherlands he made his most important contribution since the quality of his figure sculptures lagged behind his Flemish contemporaries Artus Quellinus and François Duquesnoy. Because of his reputation in this field, he got in 1616 the commission for the design and execution of the main altar of the St. John's Cathedral in 's-Hertogenbosch. A drawing and painting of this altar by Pieter Saenredam have been preserved and parts of the altar are now in the Rijksmuseum in Amsterdam.
