= Paul Bistiaux =

Belgian football director

Personal information
- Full name: Paul Bistiaux
- Place of birth: Belgium

Paul Bistiaux is a Belgian football director who is most known for his tenure as club secretary of Royal Antwerp.

== Career ==
Bistiaux was appointed as club secretary of Royal Antwerp in 1992. He played a pivotal part in setting up the loan partnership between Royal Antwerp and Manchester United in the 1990's. The agreement was set up after Bistiaux met then Manchester United director Maurice Watkins at a dinner in Madrid. United sent a total of 32 players on loan to Antwerp, most notably Danny Simpson, Jonny Evans, John O'Shea.

He left his role with Royal Antwerp in 2015.

Bistiaux was appointed as a director of Scottish club Livingston in May 2025.

== Personal life ==
He is the chairman of St. Paul's Church in Antwerp.
