= Pieter Verbrugghen I =

Flemish sculptor (1615–1686)

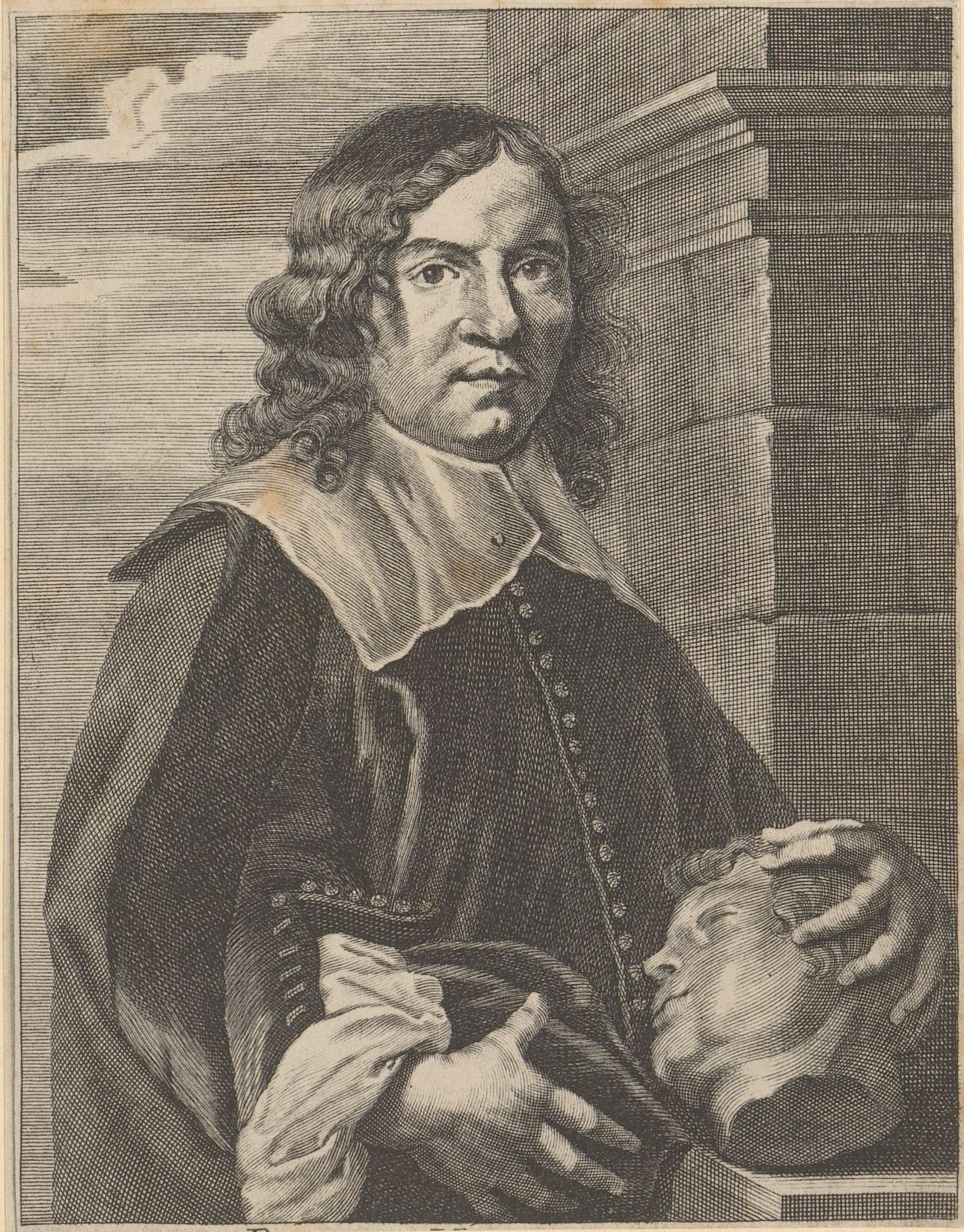
Portrait of Verbrugghen engraved by Conrad Lauwers from a painting by Erasmus Quellinus II

Pieter Verbrugghen I (alternative spellings: Pieter Verbruggen I, Peter van der Brugghen I, Pieter van der Brugghen I, Peter Verbrugghen I, Peeter Verbrugghen I) (1615, Antwerp – 1686, Antwerp) was a Flemish sculptor from the Baroque.

== Life ==
He was apprenticed in 1625 as a 'beeltsnijder' (sculptor) to Simon de Neef, who was an 'antijcsnijder' (ornamental sculptor). Later he worked under Erasmus Quellinus I and in 1641 he married his master's daughter, Cornelia Quellinus. Through his marriage he became the brother in law of the leading Antwerp sculptor Artus Quellinus the Elder. He became master of the Antwerp Guild of St. Luke in 1641 and in 1659 he became the deacon of the Guild. His first wife died in 1662, and he remarried in 1665, to Elisabeth Lemmens.

He was the father of the sculptors Pieter Verbrugghen II and Hendrik Frans Verbrugghen. His daughter Suzanna married the sculptor Peeter Meesens. His pupils included some of the leading representatives of the next generation of Flemish sculptors such as Jan Boeksent, Jan Claudius de Cock, Martin Desjardins, Bartholomeus Eggers, Jan-Lucas Faydherbe, and Pieter Scheemaeckers.

He was included in Cornelis de Bie's book on artists Het Gulden Cabinet, published in 1662, and the entry was accompanied by his engraved portrait.

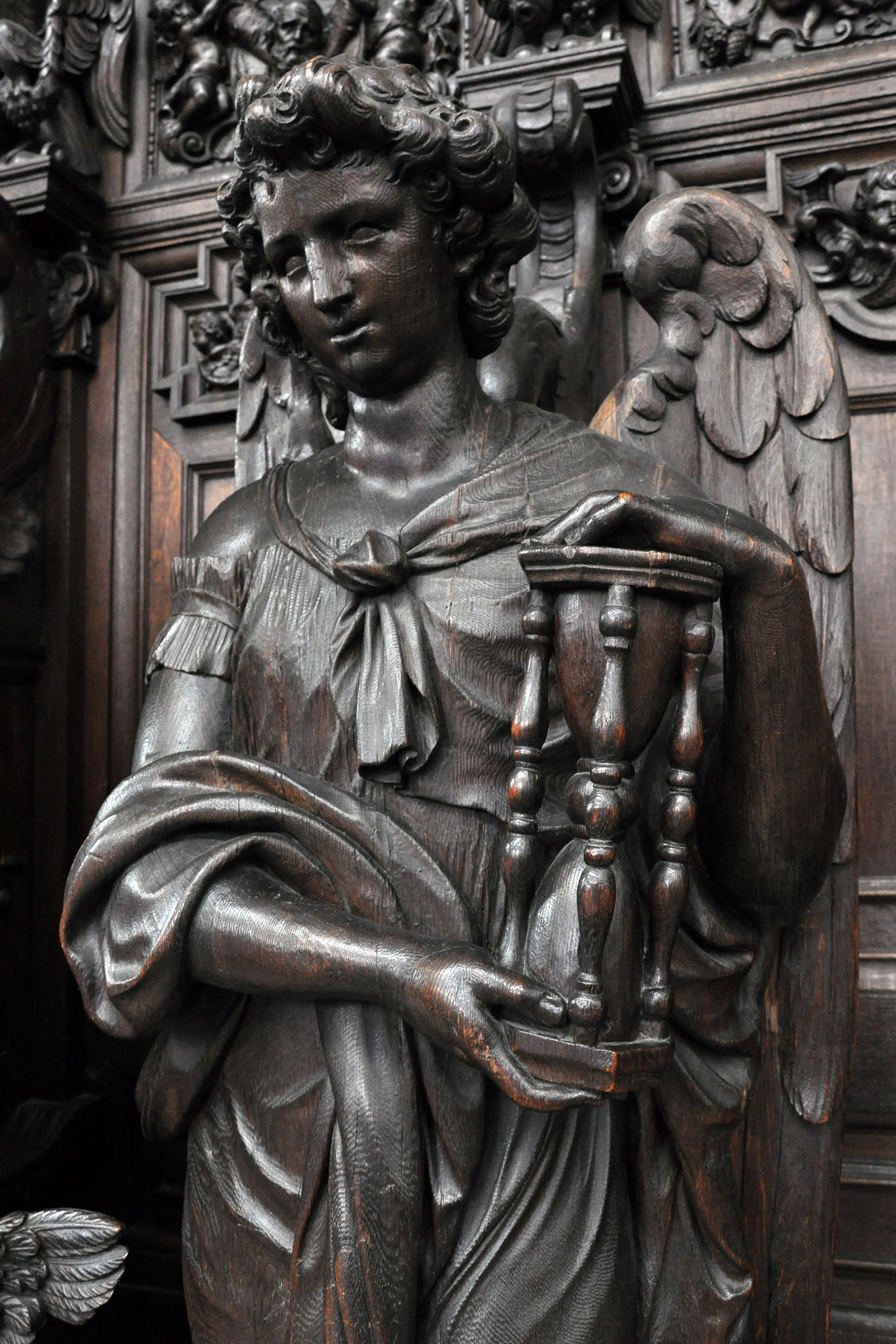
Angel holding an hourglass, detail of a confessional in the St. Paul's Church in Antwerp

== Work ==
He worked in the Flemish High Baroque style that he had learned while collaborating with his brother-in-law Artus Quellinus the Elder. His works are rather static and thick-set.

Pieter Verbrugghen I completed the frontal decoration of the organ in the Antwerp cathedral, based on a design made by Erasmus Quellinus II. He and his workshop made the oak confessionals in the St. Paul's Church in Antwerp (between 1658 and 1660). He made the oak organ case in that church in collaboration with Artus Quellinus the Elder in 1654, and together with his son Pieter Verbrugghen II he executed the designs for the high altar in 1670.

The pulpit in the St. Gummarus Church in Lier is another of his known creations. The original design for the pulpit was made by Erasmus Quellinus I, which, after his death, was somewhat changed by his son Artus. Pieter Verbrugghen I executed the design.

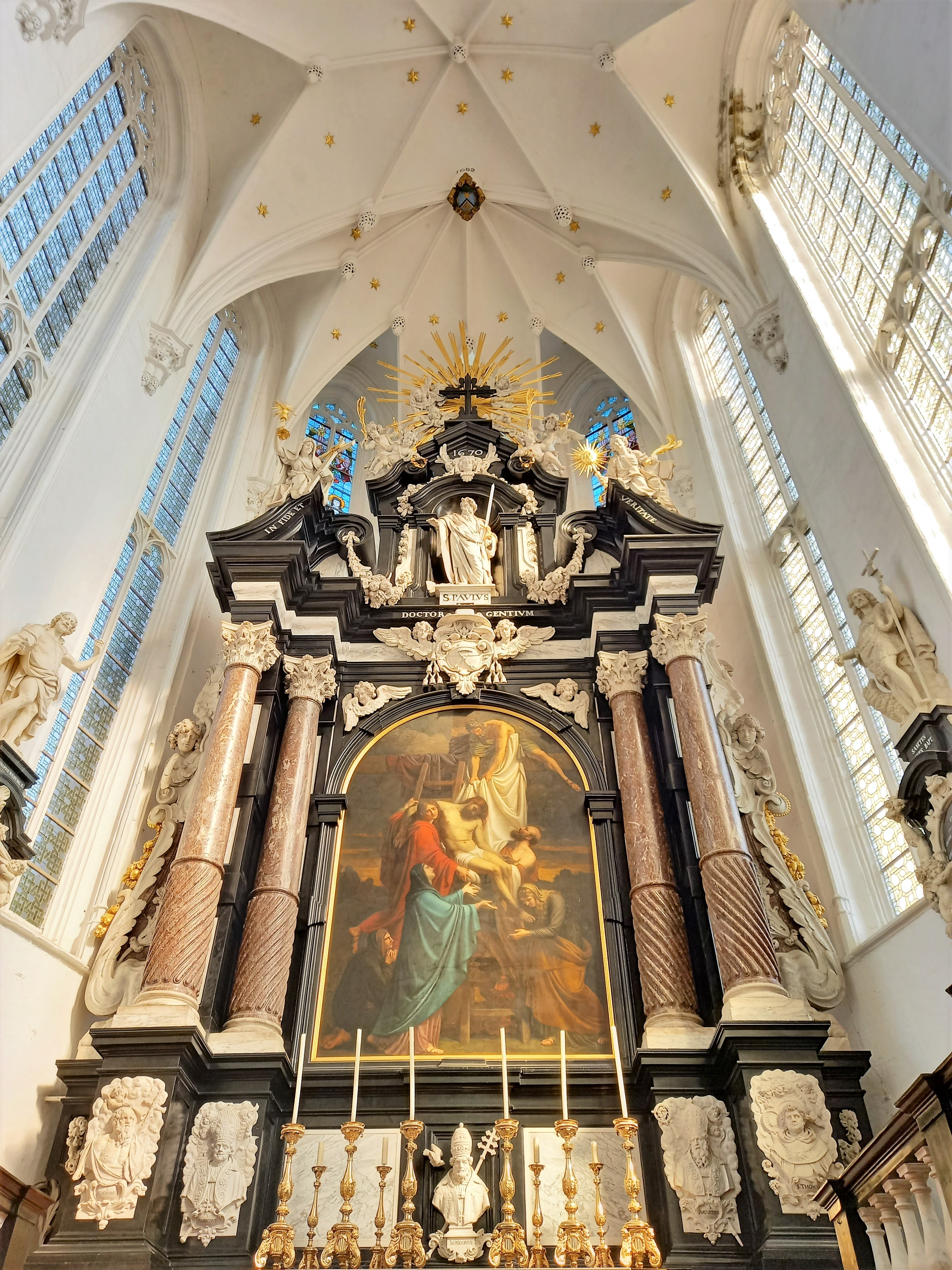
Altar St. Paul's Church, Antwerp

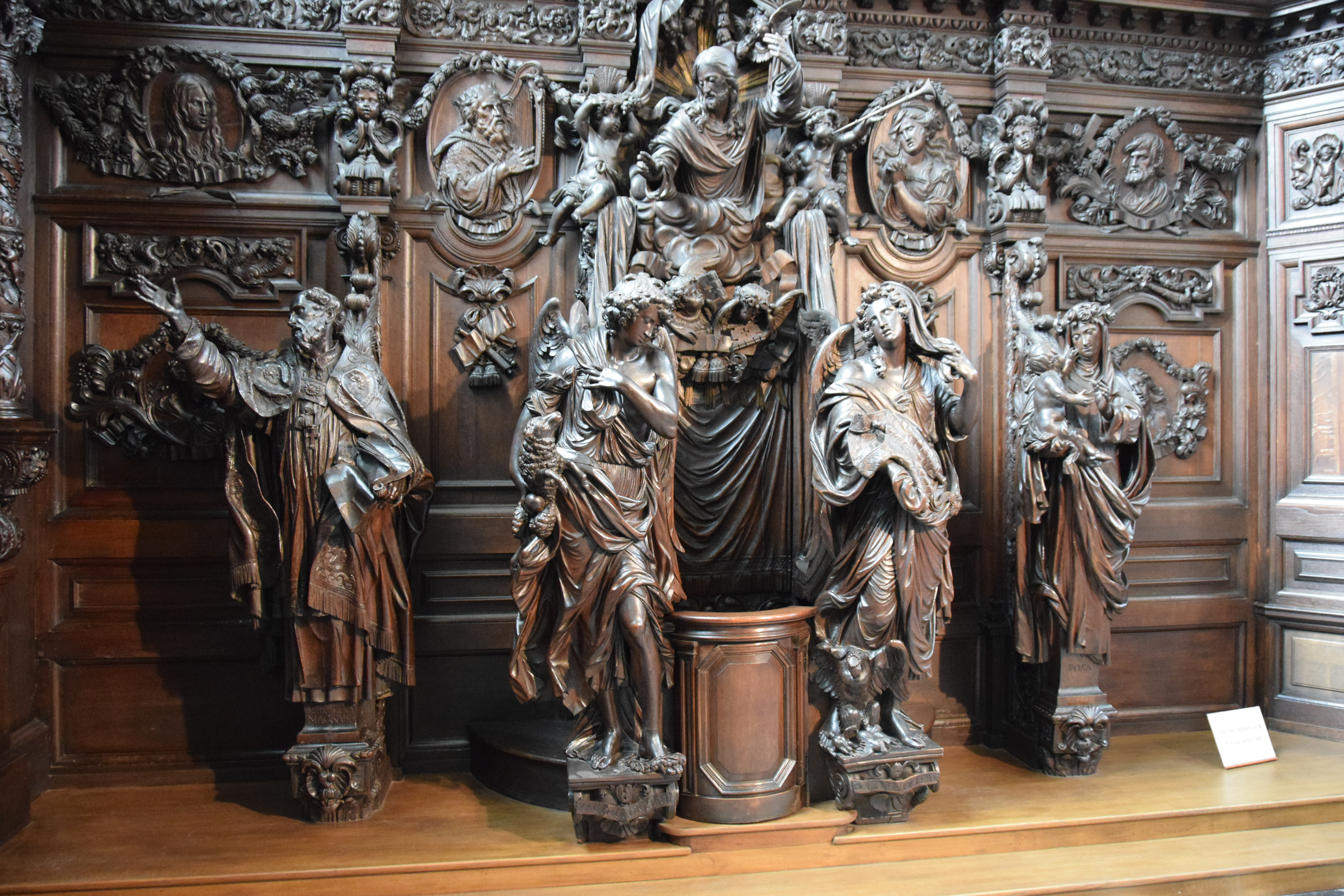
Confessionals St. Paul's Church, Antwerp

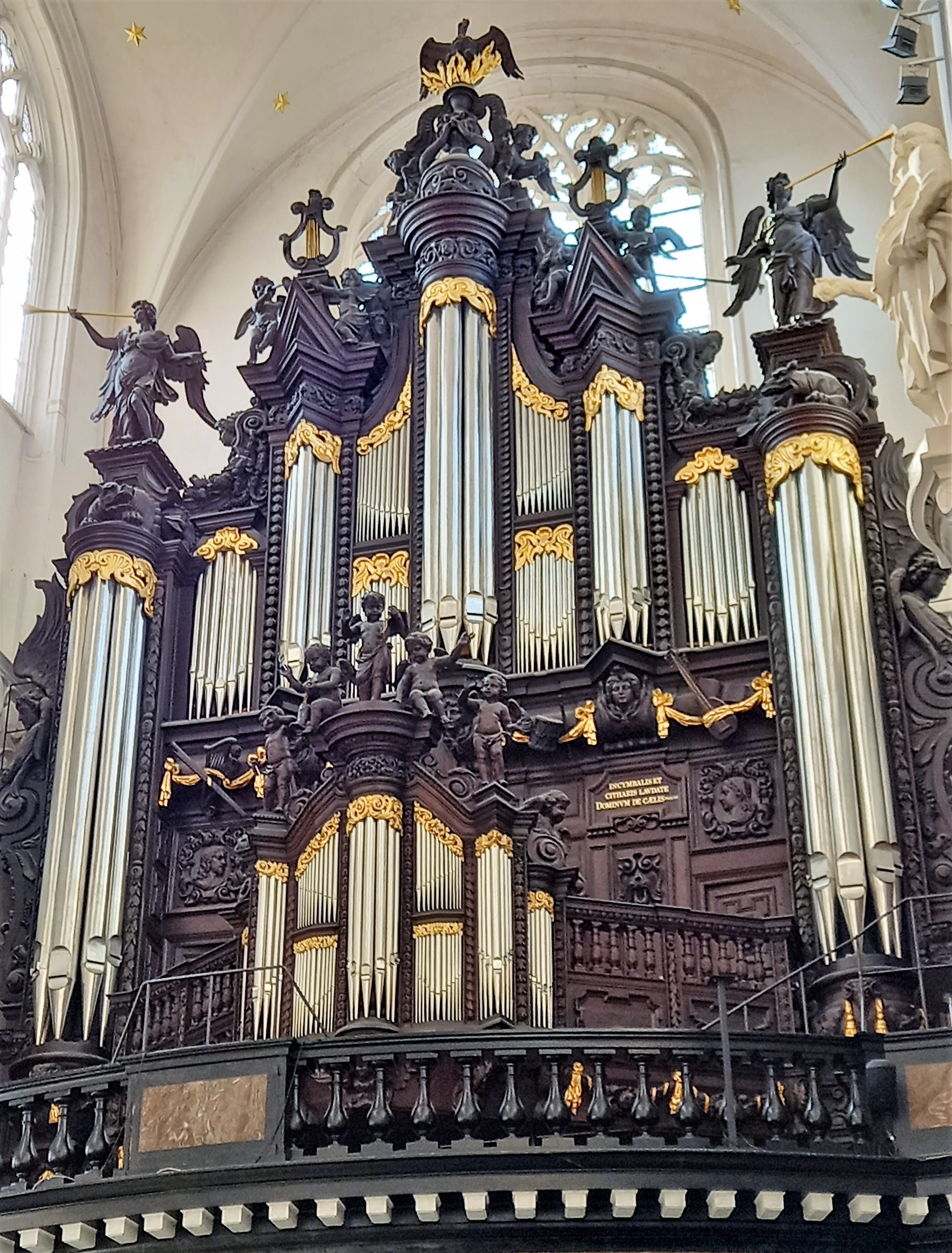
Organt St. Paul's Church

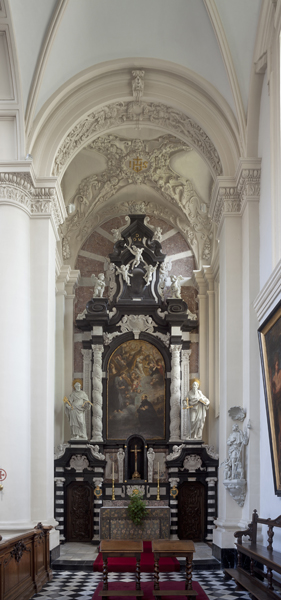
Altar St. Walburga Church (Bruges)

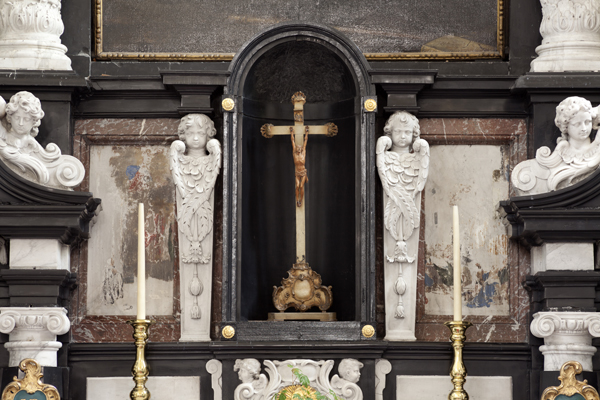
Detail St. Walburga Church

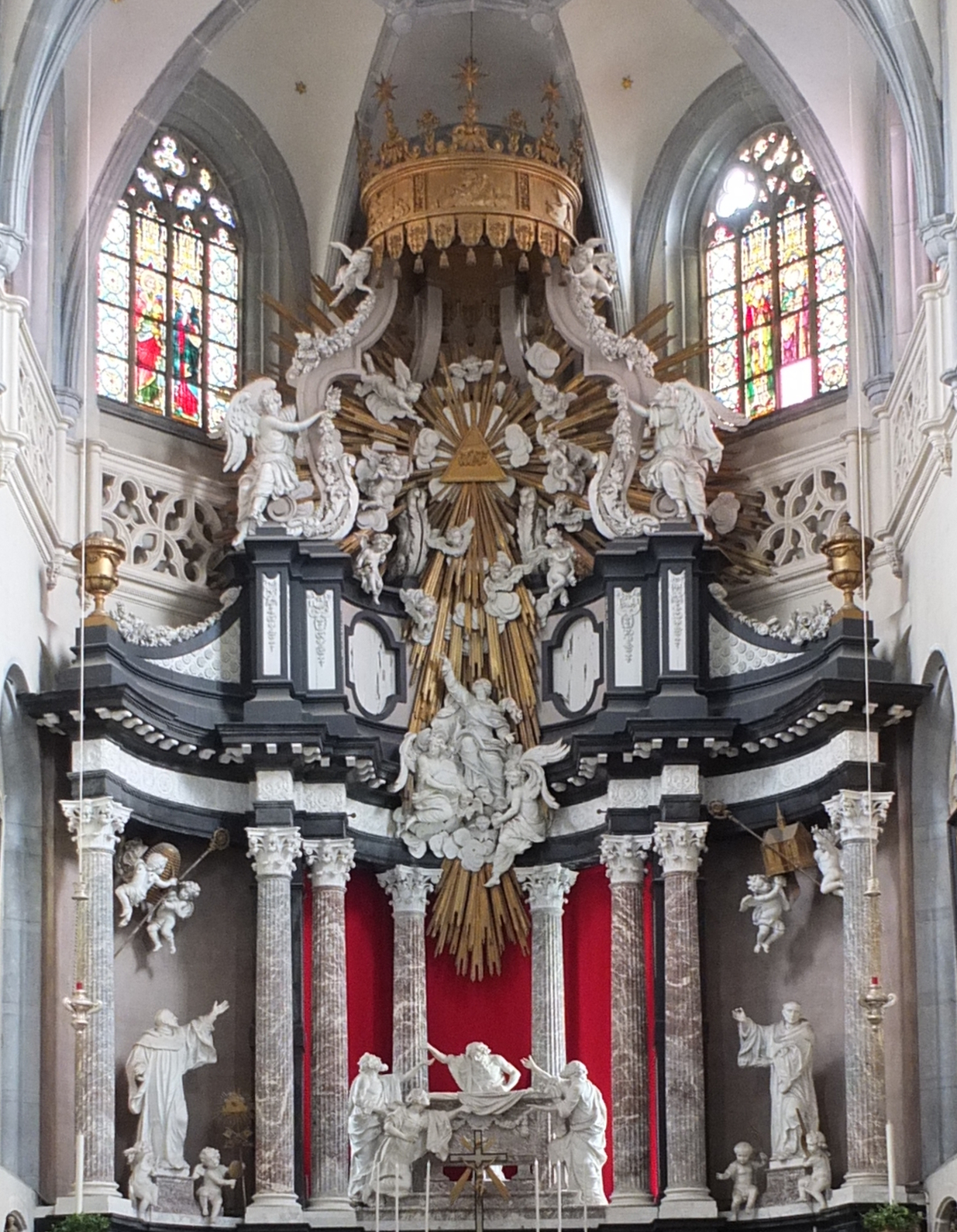
Altar St. Andrew's Church, Antwerp
