= St. Paul's Church, Antwerp =

Catholic church in Antwerp, Belgium

St. Paul's Church
- Dutch: Sint-Pauluskerk
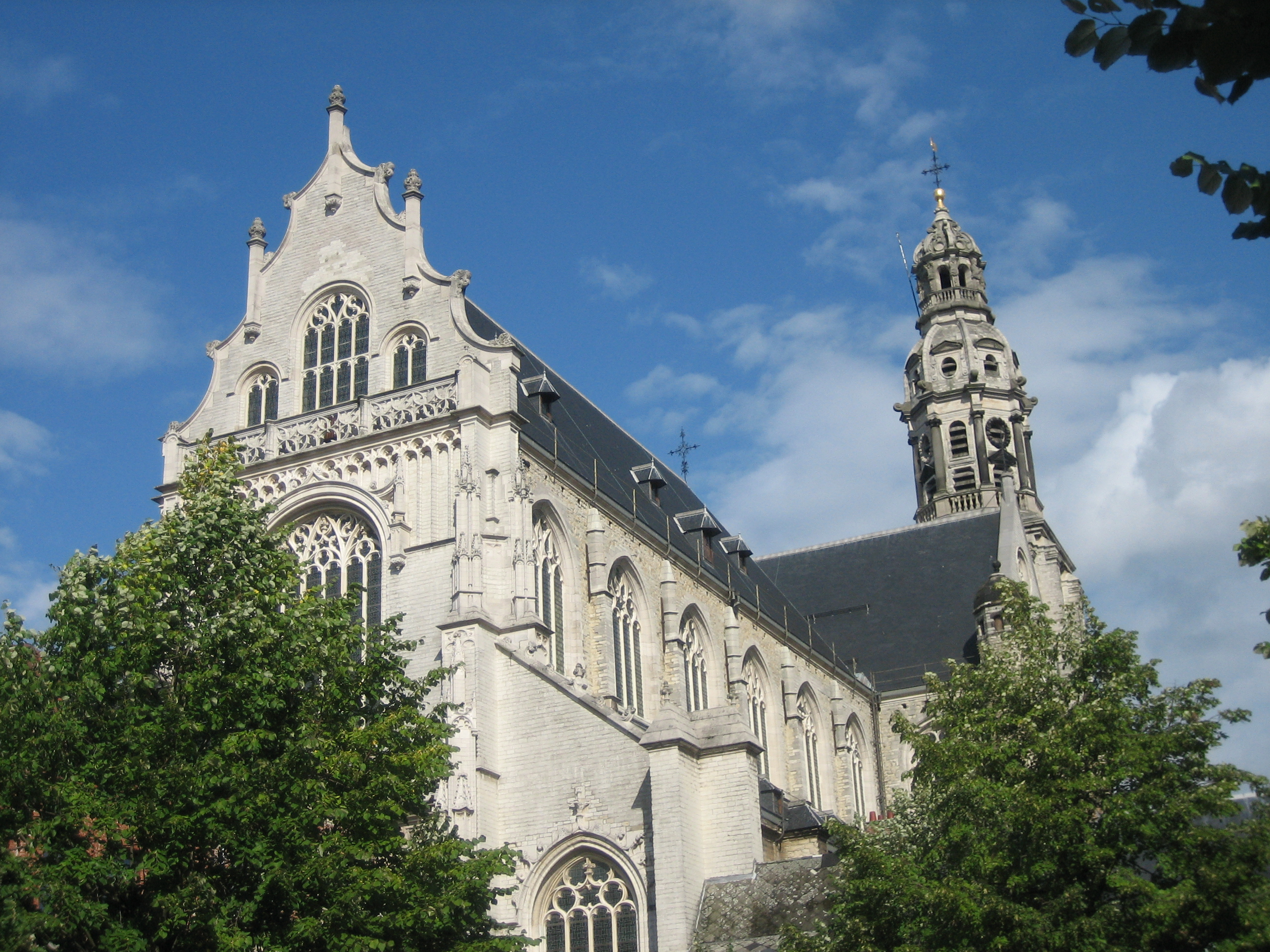
- St. Paul's Church

Religion
- Affiliation: Roman Catholic
- Diocese: Roman Catholic Archdiocese of Mechelen-Brussels
- Year consecrated: 1571

Location
- Location: Antwerp, Antwerp (province), Belgium
- Interactive map of St. Paul's Church
- Coordinates: 51°13′26.1″N 4°24′04.9″E

Architecture
- Style: Gothic, Baroque

St. Paul's Church (Dutch: Sint-Pauluskerk) is a Roman Catholic church located at the Veemarkt in Antwerp, Belgium. Its exterior is mainly Gothic with a Baroque tower while the interior is characterised by its rich Baroque decoration. It holds paintings by Antwerp's leading artists Peter Paul Rubens, Anthony van Dyck and Jacob Jordaens as well as abundant sculpture and church furniture crafted by leading Antwerp sculptors such as Artus Quellinus the Elder, Pieter Verbrugghen I, Jan Pieter van Baurscheit de Elder, Jan Claudius de Cock and Andries Colyns de Nole. Of particular note is the Calvary outside the Church which is made up of 63 life-size statues and nine reliefs executed in a popular and theatrical style.

== History ==
St. Paul's Church is located in the old city center of Antwerp, just a few steps from the Scheldt river, in a district where formerly sailors used to live. A small church was built here by the Dominican Order and consecrated in 1276 by Albertus Magnus. The church is named after the patron saint of the Dominicans, St. Paul.

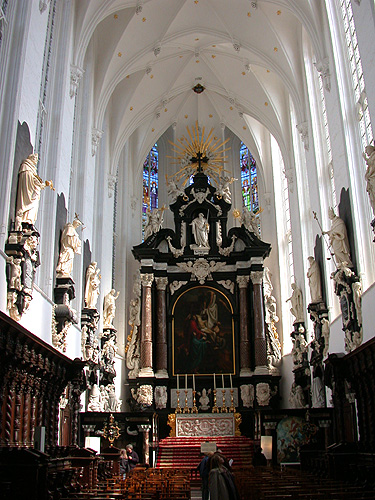
Interior of St. Paul's Church

As the church had become exposed to flooding as a result of a change in course of the Scheldt river, the Dominican Prior A. van Leent decided to build a new church on a larger and higher-lying piece of land next to the existing church. The construction designs were probably made by Domien de Waghemakere, a co-designer of the Antwerp Cathedral. After his death in 1542 Rombout de Dryvere is known to have continued as the architect and master builder. The church was taken into partial use in 1548 and the following year the old church was demolished. The new church was completed and dedicated in 1571. In the same year, the Our Lady of the Rosary fraternity was founded in the church to celebrate the Battle of Lepanto in which the Spanish fleet defeated the Turks. Work on the new monastery probably also started around this time.

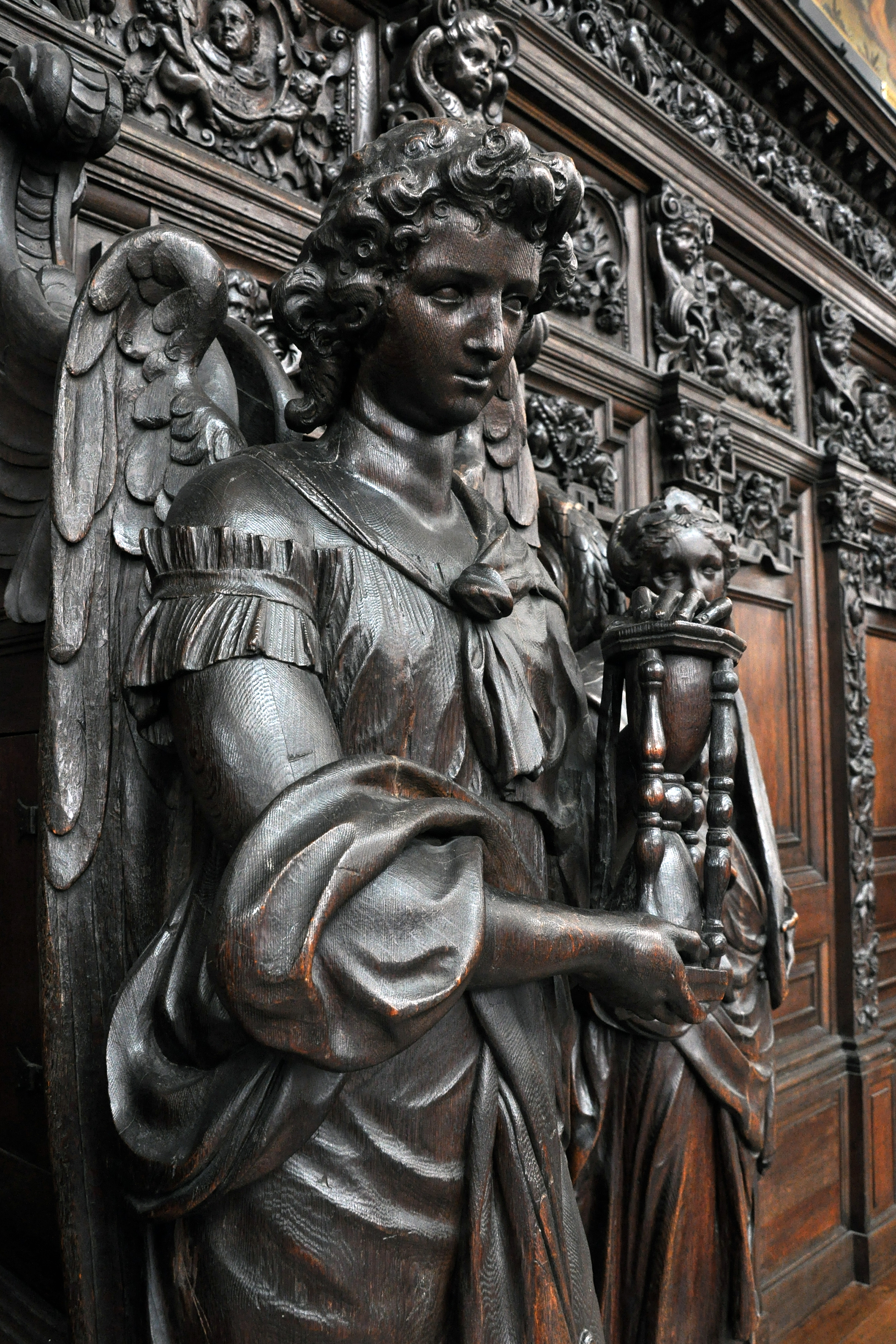
Detail of a confessional

When the Calvinists came to power in Antwerp in 1578, the Dominicans were expelled, the church and monastery were cleared and the nave of the church was transformed into a Calvinist oratory. The transepts and chancel were partially demolished and part of the monastery was used as a cannon foundry of the army. When in 1584 Farnese laid siege to Antwerp to reclaim it for the Spanish throne, he had a bridge built over the Scheldt to block supply to the city. The defenders of the city tried to send fire ships to ignite the bridge. They used materials from the transepts and choir of St. Paul's Church as ballast in these ships. After the fall of Antwerp in 1585, the Dominican Fathers returned and began to rebuild and refurbish the church and the monastery.

The initial phase of the rebuilding of the monastery was undertaken between 1605 and 1616 and reconstruction was completed in 1662. In 1618 the first stone was laid of a new and enlarged choir and transept. In 1639 the new choir was consecrated by the Bishop of Antwerp. During the following decades, the interior of the church was fitted out with Baroque furniture and decoration. The Antwerp sculptor Pieter Verbrugghen I and his workshop made the oak confessionals between 1658 and 1660. The same artist made the oak organ case in the church in 1654 and together with his son Pieter Verbrugghen II he executed the designs for the high altar in 1670. The high altar was dedicated in 1670 by Mgr. Capello of Antwerp. In 1679 a major fire destroyed part of the vaults of the nave and the upper part of the western facade. The damage was repaired in 1680-81 and at the same time the top of the tower was finished in a Baroque style after a design by Nicolaes Millich. In 1692 the Venerable Chapel was completed. The Calvary was constructed against the south side of the nave between 1697 and 1747.

In 1796 all Dominicans monasteries in the Southern Netherlands were closed down on the order of the French occupiers. At this time all the old church records, containing information about the Dominican Order, the church and the convent, were lost. The church was sold publicly and bought by Dominican Prior Peltiers. He was thus able to save the rich contents of the church. In 1802 the church, the Calvary and part of the monastery were taken over by the city council. The church was consecrated the following year as a parish church, replacing the old, dilapidated St. Walburga Church, which was demolished in 1817.

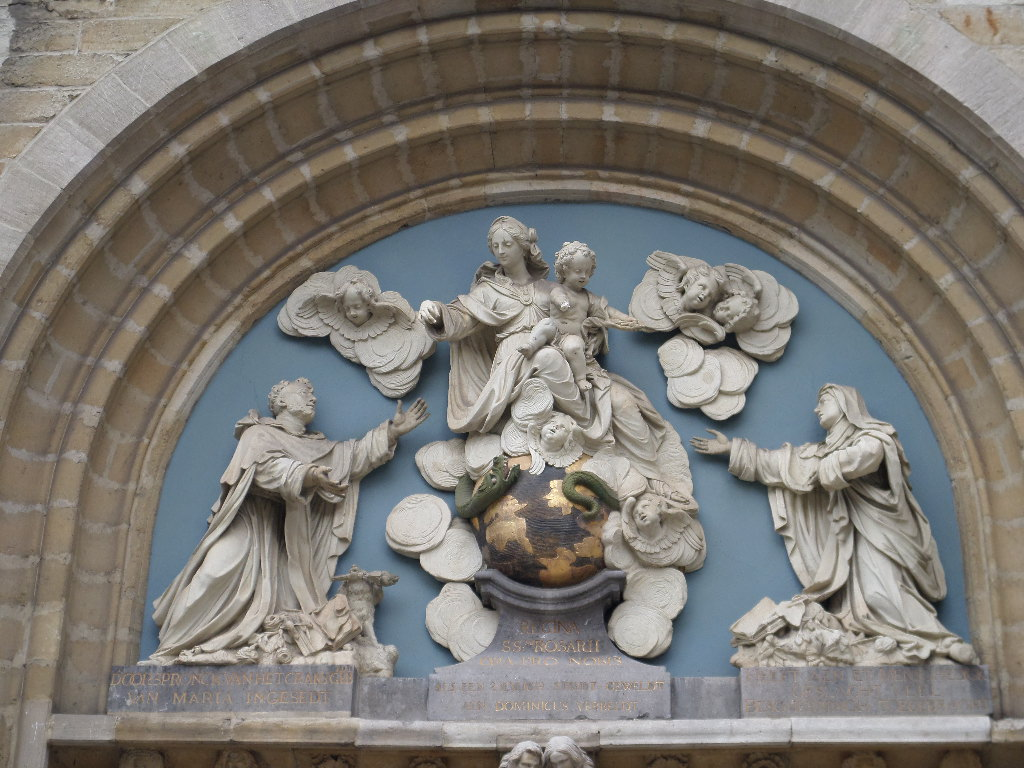
Tympanum sculpture of Our Lady of the Rosary by Jan Claudius de Cock

During the Ten Days' Campaign undertaken by the Dutch in 1830 after the Belgian Revolution, a Dutch garrison bombarded Antwerp. The church was damaged and all the 17th century stained glass windows, made after designs by Abraham van Diepenbeeck, were destroyed. In 1833 the interior of the church was changed: the rood screen dating from 1654, which had been executed by Pieter Verbruggen II and his workshop was dismantled to allow an unobstructed view through the nave to the choir. A new rood screen had previously been built on the western side of the nave.

In April 1968 a fire destroyed the entire roof of the church, damaged the vaults and the interior, completely burned down the top of the Baroque tower and reduced three-quarters of the monastery to ruins. The restoration works have taken a long time to complete.

== The exterior ==
The exterior is mainly executed in the Brabantine Gothic style and is characterized by the austere architecture with little exterior decoration, which is common in churches of mendicant orders. For the interior walls brick was used, while the outer vestments and structural components are in Ledian sandstone.

The tower was rebuilt in the late 17th century with a Baroque top. The baroque portal on the angled corner of Veemarkt and Zwartzustersstraat dates from 1734. In the arch above the gate is a tympanum sculpture by Jan Claudius de Cock of 1734 depicting Our Lady of the Rosary giving the rosary to Saint Dominic and Catherine of Siena, the reformer of the Dominican Order.

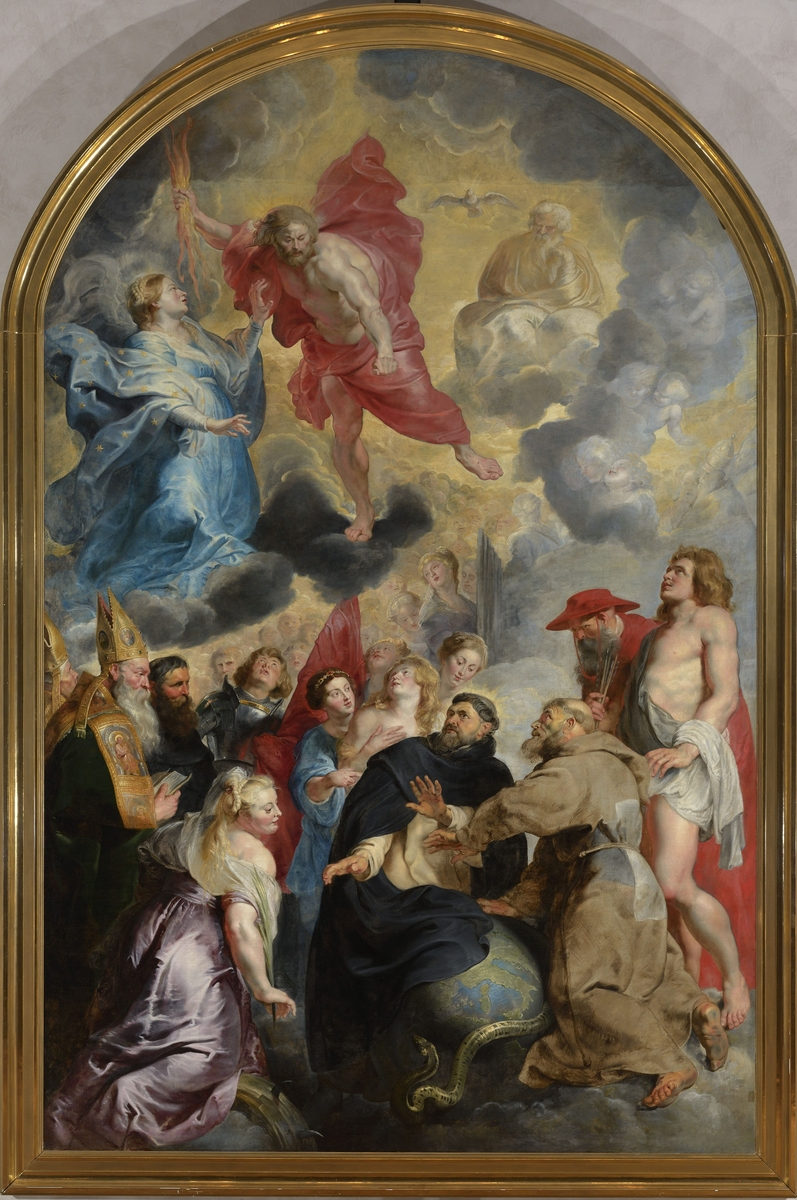
Altar seized during the French occupation and removed to the Louvre as war booty in 1794. Today in Lyon.

== The interior ==
The columns in St. Paul's Church are cylindrical and are topped by a capital with cabbage leaf motif. The interior decoration is a good example of the Flemish Baroque style in painting as well as church furniture.

Among the many works of art in the church are works by major artists such as the Antwerp painters Peter Paul Rubens, Anthony van Dyck, Jacob Jordaens, Cornelis de Vos, Gaspar de Crayer, Frans Francken II, Abraham van Diepenbeeck, Theodoor Boeyermans, Artus de Bruyn, Arnout Vinckenborch and Matthys Voet.

=== Main altar ===
Pieter Verbrugghen I and his son Pieter Verbrugghen II created a Baroque marble main altar that was constructed around Rubens' painting The vision of St. Dominic. The Dominicans ordered in 1670 a new painting on the Martyrdom of St. Paul from Theodoor Boeyermans. This painting and Rubens' painting were installed in the new main altar and could be shown alternately through a rotating mechanism with hinges. Both paintings were robbed by the French occupiers in 1794 and sent to Paris. In 1811 Napoleon donated the paintings to two regional museums: Rubens' St. Dominic to the Musée des Beaux Arts in Lyon, and Boeyermans’ St. Paul to that of Aix-en-Provence. Despite the agreements of the Congress of Vienna of 1815 neither altarpiece was ever returned by France on the pretext that Napoleon had given them to regional museums. The painting The Descent from the Cross completed by Cornelis Cels in 1807 is now placed in the space occupied by the stolen altarpieces.

=== Sculpture ===
St. Paul's Church holds the most impressive array of Baroque confessionals in Belgium. The 10 confessionals, executed around 1659 by Pieter Verbrugghen I with the assistance of his workshop and other sculptors, are divided in groups of five on the side of both aisles. Each confessional is flanked by two statues on either side. The confessionals are not conceived as separate pieces of furniture but are connected by a wooden paneling. The entire wall of each aisle is thus turned into a single united piece of furniture, the iconography of which strives to achieve the same unity and synthesis as the whole structure.

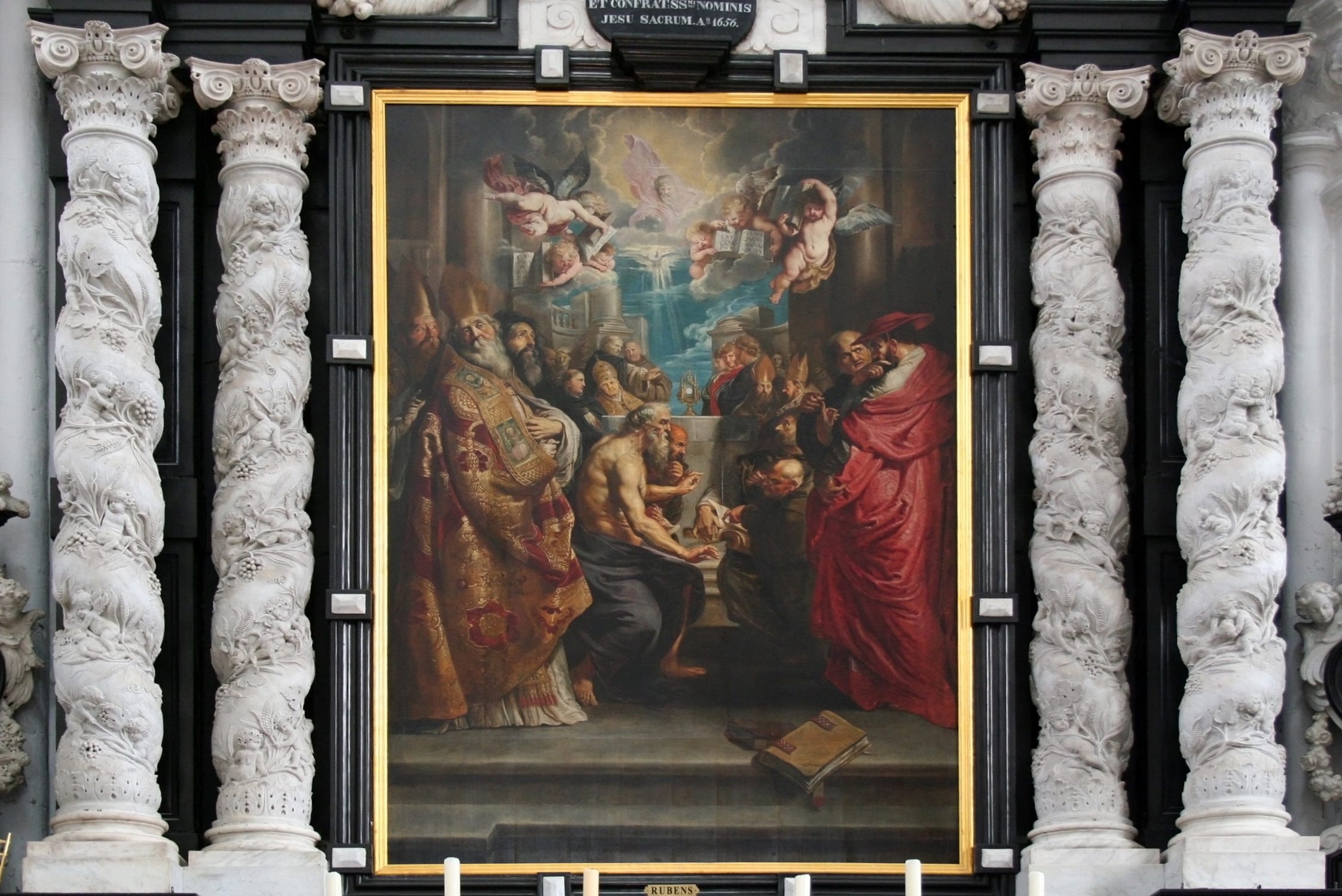
Chapel of the Holy Sacrament, altar by Pieter Verbrugghen I and The Disputation of the Holy Sacrament by Rubens

The sculptors Artus Quellinus the Elder, Pieter Verbrugghen I, Jan Pieter van Baurscheit de Elder and Andries Colyns de Nole created 8 life-size white stone sculptures of Dominican saints between the years 1631 and 1700 which are placed between the windows of the choir.

On the south side is the Chapel of the Holy Sacrament and of the Sweet Name Jezus which has an altar sculpted by Pieter Verbrugghen I and an altar piece by Rubens on The Disputation of the Holy Sacrament. This chapel also holds a Baroque confessional by Willem Kerricx that was originally placed on the north side of the main entrance.

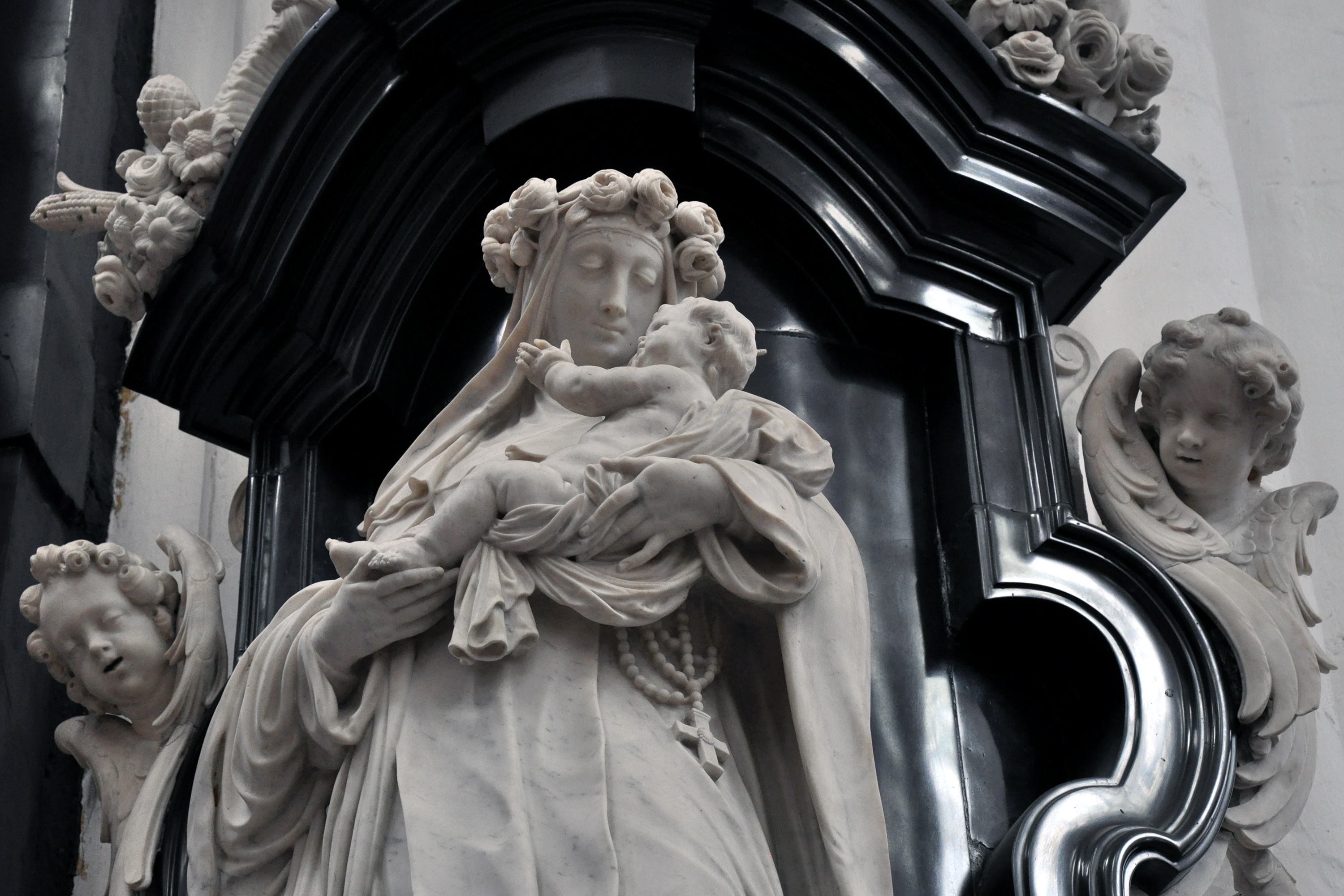
St. Rosa of Lima, by Artus Quellinus the Younger

On the north side is the Maria Chapel with a Baroque altar which was commenced by Huibrecht van den Eynde, continued by his pupil Sebastiaen de Neve and completed by Jan Pieter van Baurscheit de Elder in 1728. A typical rubensian motif are the dozens of miniature putti and cherubs on the ascending branches of vegetal, Marian symbols on the twisted marble columns. The painting Adoration of the shepherds by Rubens forms the altar piece. The Maria Chapel also contains a white marble sculpture of Our Lady of Sorrows by Jan Pieter van Baurscheit de Elder.

The church holds elaborate tomb monuments attributed to Johannes van Mildert, Pieter Verbrugghen II and Andries Colyns de Nole.

The 17th century organ is regarded as one of the most important organs of Belgium. The monumental organ case was sculpted by Pieter Verbrugghen I after a design by Erasmus Quellinus II.

=== The stolen Caravaggio ===
In 1623, the painting Madonna of the Rosary by Caravaggio arrived in Antwerp probably via the Dutch market. On the initiative of some artists, among whom Peter Paul Rubens, Hendrick van Balen and Jan Brueghel the Elder, the painting was donated as altarpiece to St. Paul's Church. Rubens organized the leading Antwerp painters to make a series of 15 paintings on the theme of the "Mystery of the Rosary Cycle" to flank the Caravaggio painting. In 1786, Emperor Joseph II of Austria, after ordering the closing of all 'useless' monastic orders, claimed the painting of Caravaggio for his art collection. It can now be admired in the Kunsthistorisches Museum in Vienna. St. Paul's Church replaced the original a few years later with a copy made by Andreas Bernardus de Quertenmont, a director of the Antwerp Academy. Caravaggio 's work, which was a princely gift of Antwerp's leading artists and an expression of their deep religious devotion had become the object of looting by the Austrian rulers.

== The Calvary ==
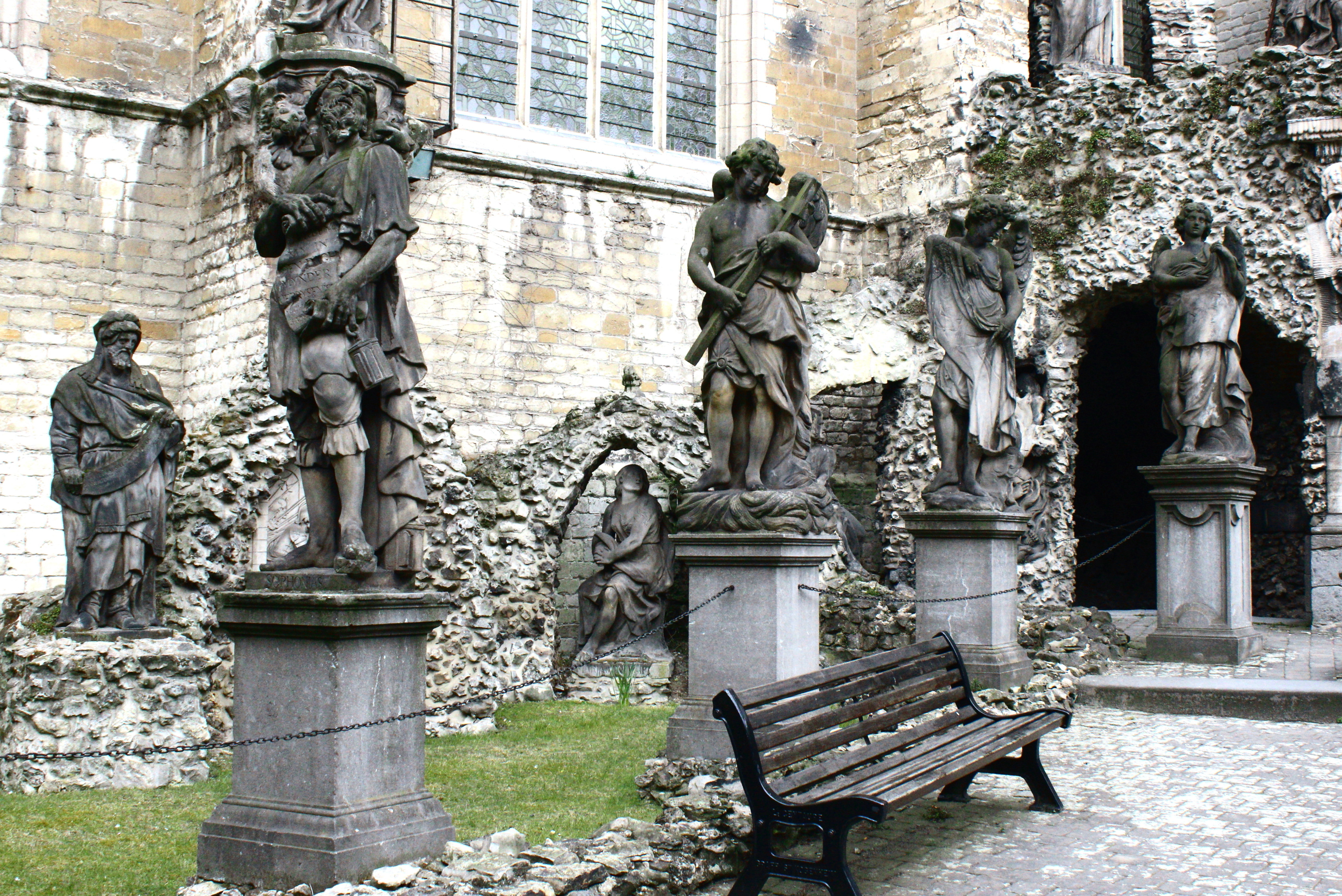
The Calvary, view along the angel path

On the outside of the church is a group of statues referred to as the Calvary. It was created on the location of an ancient Dominican cemetery by the brothers van Ketwigh who were Dominican friars. Its design dates from 1697. In 1734 construction of the Calvary was completed but further statues were added up to 1747. It is built as a courtyard and leans on one side against the south aisle of the church and the Chapel of the Holy Sacrament.

The structure includes 63 life-size statues and nine reliefs executed in a popular and theatrical style. Most statues are of white stone with some made of wood. Some statues are dated or signed. The principal sculptors were Michiel van der Voort the Elder, Alexander van Papenhoven and Jan Claudius de Cock with some statues by the hand of Willem Kerricx and his son Willem Ignatius Kerricx, Jan Pieter van Baurscheit de Elder and anonymous collaborators.

The statues are arranged into four groups: the angel path, which ascends to the Holy Sepulchre, the garden of the prophets on the left, the garden of the evangelists on the right and the Calvary itself, which consists of an elevated artificial rock, divided into three terraces, on which statues are placed with Christ on the cross at the top.
