= Andreas de Nole =

Flemish sculptor

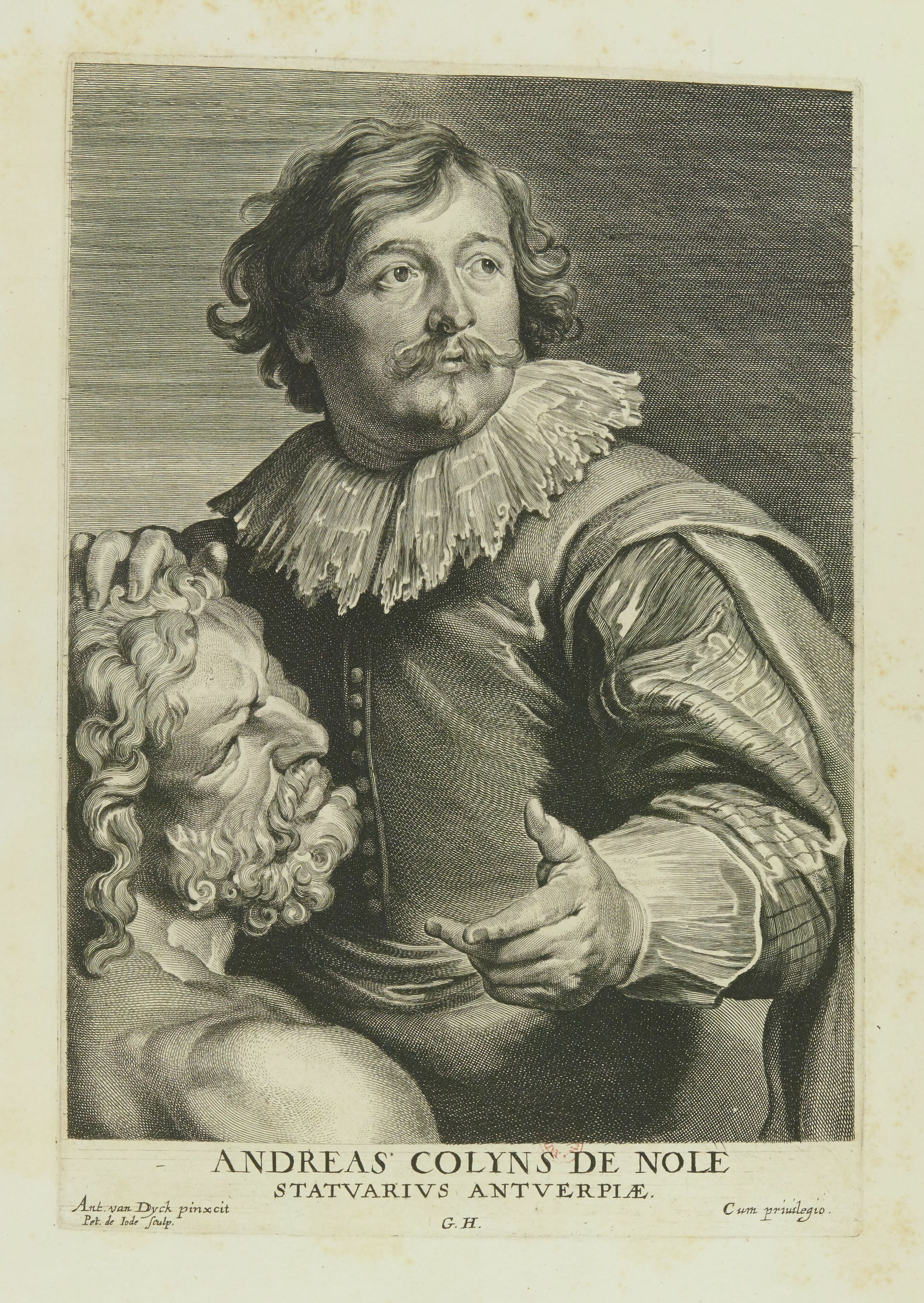
Engraved portrait of Andreas Colyns de Nole by Pieter de Jode II after Anthony van Dyck

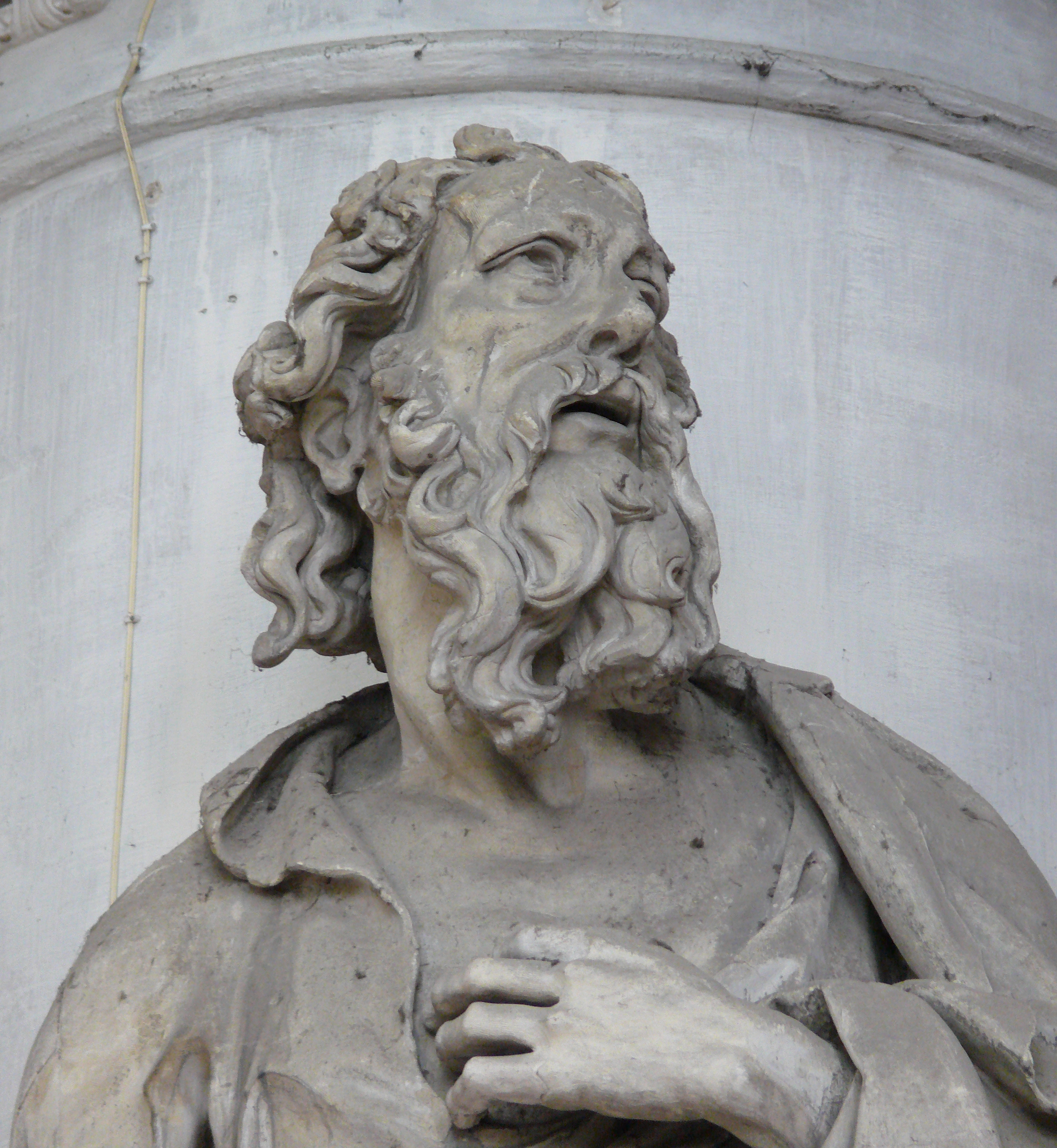
Detail of head of St. Andrew in Sint-Romboutskathedraal

Andreas de Nole (1598 – 1638), was a Flemish sculptor.

== Biography ==
He was born in Antwerp, where he trained before travelling to Rome. He became the teacher of Sebastiaen de Neve and is known today for his work on the apostle and evangelist statues in the St. Rumbold's Cathedral in Mechelen. He worked on that project together with the sculptor Johannes van Mildert and his son Cornelis van Mildert.

He died in Antwerp.
