= Pieter Verbrugghen the Younger =

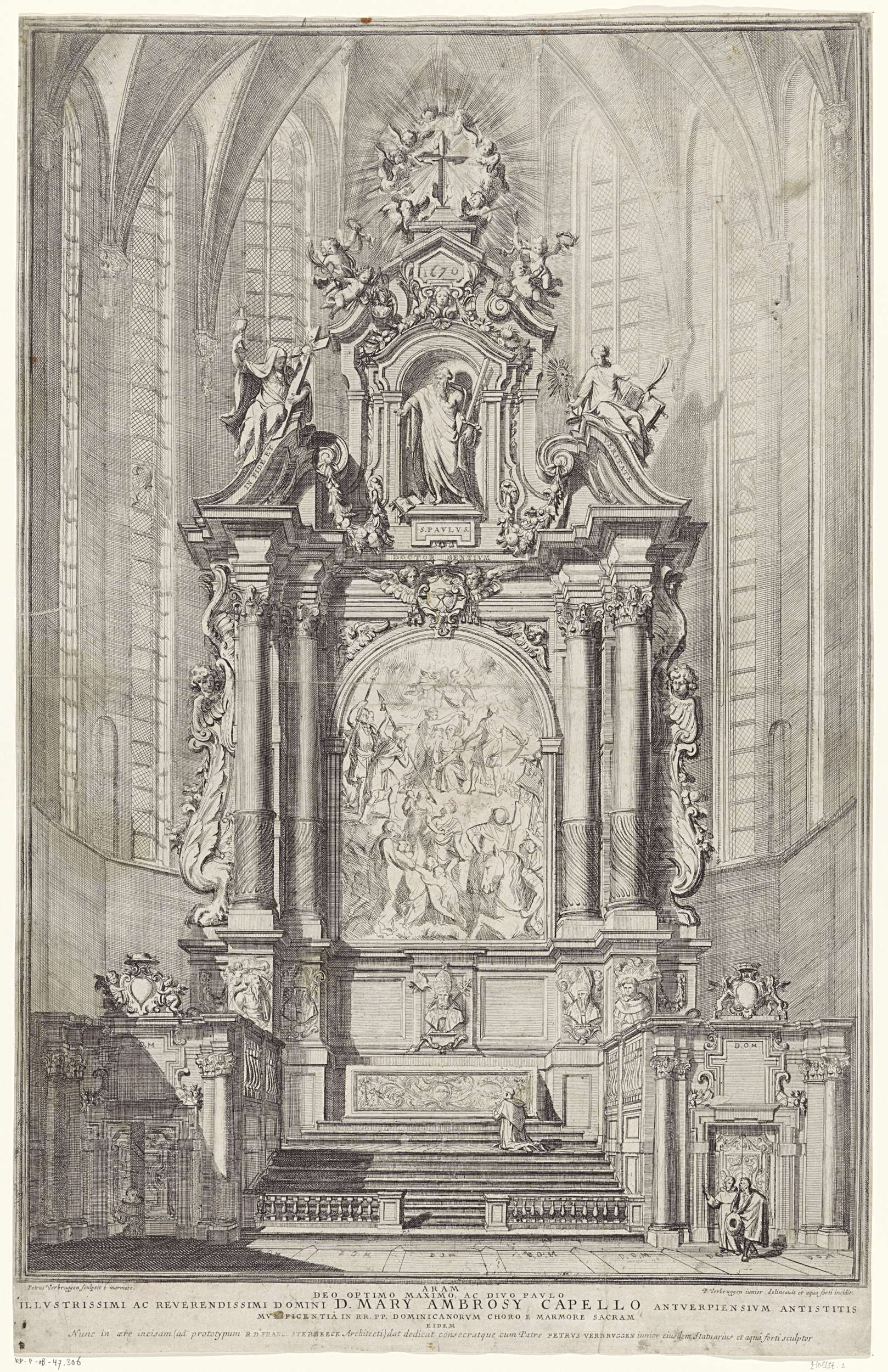
Design for main altar of the Antwerp St. Paul Church, 1670

Pieter Verbrugghen the Younger or Pieter Verbrugghen II (1648, Antwerp – after 1691, Antwerp) was a Flemish sculptor, draughtsman, etcher and stone merchant.

== Life ==
Pieter Verbruggen was a son of Pieter Verbrugghen I, who was one of the leading Antwerp sculptors. His mother Cornelia Quellinus was the daughter of the Antwerp sculptor Erasmus Quellinus I who had been the master of his father. Pieter probably received his training from his father. He was admitted as a 'wijnmeester', i.e. son of a master, in the Antwerp Guild of Saint Luke in the guild year 1660–1661. His father was at the time the deacon of the guild. After being admitted as a master of the Guild he remained to work in his father's workshop as a collaborator.

After completing his training and working in Antwerp, he set out for Rome on 8 September 1674 in the company of various persons including the painter Abraham Genoels. Travelling via Germany and Austria, the company arrived in Rome on 4 November 1674. The presence of P.II Verbruggen in Rome was found in Stati d'Anime (Cf. A. Jacobs in exhibition cat. exh. Alla luce di Roma. I disegni scenografici di scultori fiamminghi e il Barocco romano, Rome, Istituto centrale de la Grafica, 2016 - 2017, p. 64 ISBN 978-88-6557-326-6)> While there he is known to have made drawings after Gianlorenzo Bernini and antique sculptures, which were later used by his brother Hendrik Frans Verbrugghen. He joined on 3 January 1675 the Bentvueghels, an association of mainly Dutch and Flemish artists working in Rome, where he took the nickname (referred to as 'bent name') 'Ballon' (Dutch for 'balloon'). He was admitted to the Bentvueghels at the same time as Abraham Genoels and François Moens.

Pieter returned to Antwerp in 1677 where he worked as an engraver. He became dean of the Guild in 1691. He married Maria Isabella Heck in 1688.

He died in Antwerp where he was buried in St. Andrew Church on 12 October 1691. Joannes Boecksent was his pupil.

== Work ==
He is known for various designs of tombs and other religious structures including the designs for the high altar of the St. Paul's Church in Antwerp which he executed with his father Pieter Verbrugghen I in 1670. His works belong to the Flemish High Baroque tradition. He was a fine craftsman rather than an original artist.
