= Hendrik Frans Verbrugghen =

Flemish sculptor and draftsman

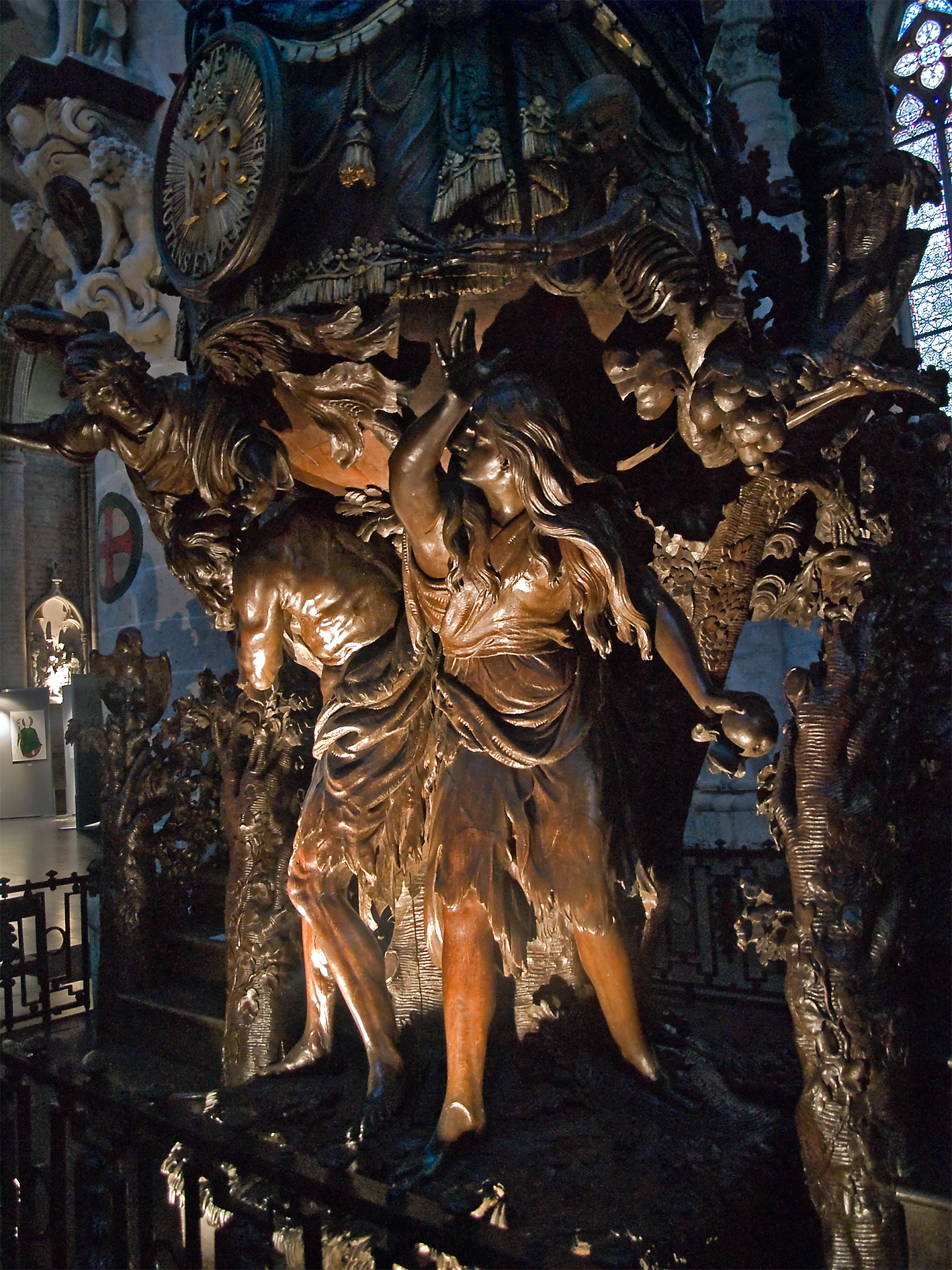
Adam and Eve expelled from Eden, detail of the pulpit in the Cathedral of St. Michael and St. Gudula, Brussels, 1699

Hendrik Frans Verbrugghen or Hendrik Frans Verbruggen (30 April 1654 in Antwerp – 12 December 1724 in Antwerp) was a Flemish sculptor and draftsman, who is best known for his Baroque church furniture in various Belgian churches.

== Life ==
He was born into a family from which in the 17th and 18th century a number of prominent sculptors emerged who were mainly active in Antwerp. His father, the sculptor Pieter Verbrugghen I, was one of the principal representatives of Flemish high baroque sculpture. The father had been a pupil of Erasmus Quellinus I, who was himself the founder of a prominent family of artists. The father married the daughter of his master Erasmus Quellinus. From this marriage Hendrik Frans Verbruggen was born. His brother Pieter Verbrugghen II was also a sculptor and worked in the workshop of his father.

Hendrik Frans Verbruggen was trained by his father. Nonetheless, he did not start his career as a sculptor but as a draughtsman working with the illuminator Jan Ruyselinck. It can not be ruled out that like his brother Pieter, he made a trip to Italy after completing his training. This trip has not been documented. The obvious influence of the Italian sculptor Gianlorenzo Bernini on his work could also be explained by Hendrik Frans Verbruggen drawing inspiration from the drawings after the works of Bernini and antique sculptures that his brother made in Rome.

In 1670, Verbrugghen and Sebastiaen van den Eynde were "specifically invited for their advice" to travel to Mechelen as consultants for works on the Cathedral there.

He became a master sculptor at the Antwerp Guild of Saint Luke in 1682. That year he married Susanna Verhulst. He became dean of the Guild of Saint Luke in 1689. In 1713 he went bankrupt but this did not prevent him from completing ongoing commissions.

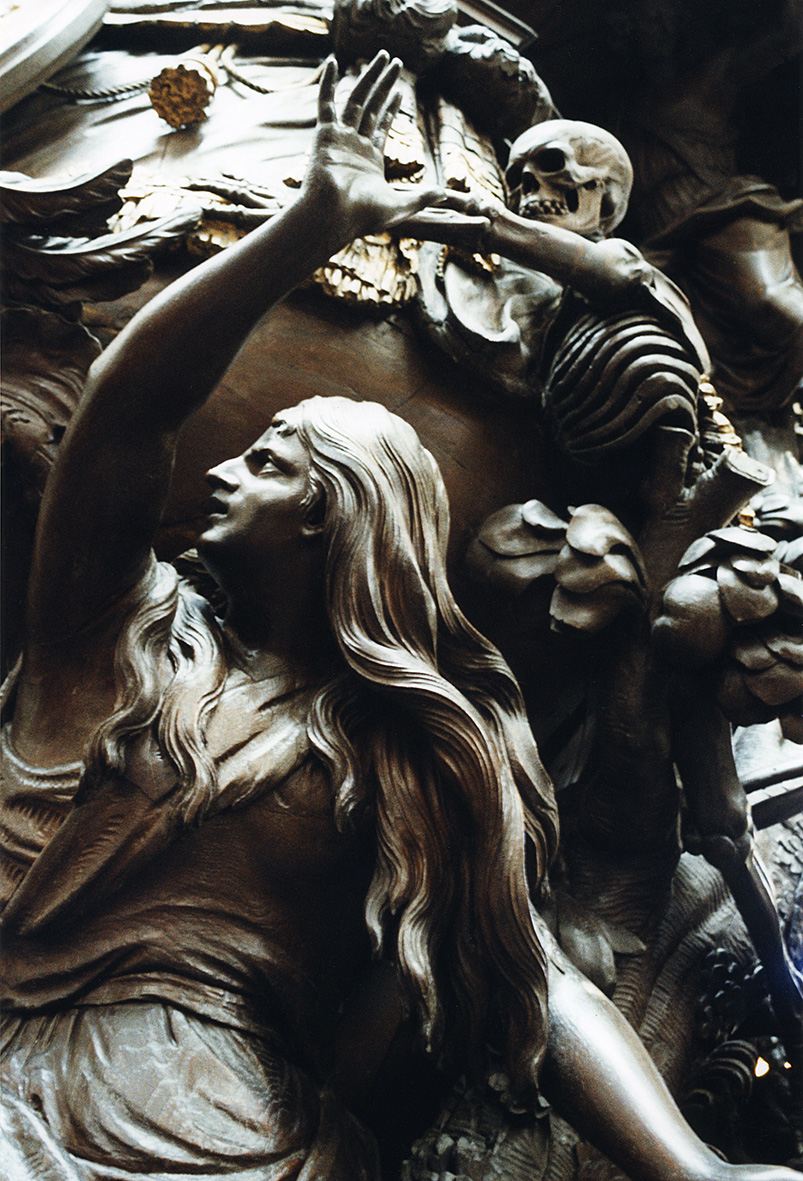
Eve and Death, detail of the pulpit in the Cathedral of St. Michael and St. Gudula, Brussels

He was the master of Egidius Adrianus Nijs and Marcus de Cock.

== Works ==
Hendrik Frans Verbruggen was active during the Baroque period when the Catholic Church was the main sponsor of artists in the Southern Netherlands. He therefore worked principally on religious commissions and became one of the leading sculptors of the late Baroque church furniture. This furniture has more depth than the high baroque altars of his father and brother. The three-dimensional altars are often designed to allow the placing of a sculpture although sometimes they served to hang a painting. The latter is the case in the St. Augustine Church in Antwerp, where a painting by Rubens has been placed in the altar. Hendrik Frans Verbruggen was one of the founders of the so-called naturalistic pulpits. These appear as a single grand sculpture in which the constructive form disappears. Examples are the pulpit in St. Augustine Church in Antwerp and the pulpit designed for the Church of Saint Michael in Leuven (now in the Cathedral of Brussels). In the pulpit of the St. Augustine Church in Antwerp he used the grain of the wood to depict the wrinkles of the face of St. Augustine and the texture of his clothes.

In 1684 he created two limewood side altars for the Chapel of the Church of Our Lady of Good Will in Duffel. Through this work he introduced into the Southern Netherlands a new motif derived from the work of Bernini, consisting of an oval painting supported by two flying angels. His altar rails for the St. Walburga Church in Bruges from 1695 are a highlight of Flemish baroque. Because of the virtuoso treatment of the marble they appear to be modeled in wax.

In the Baroque worldview, art was expected to educate the faithful and encourage them in their faith. The motifs of Hendrik Frans Verbruggen often reflect this didactic purpose. An example is the late-Baroque pulpit in the St. Peter and Paul Church in Mechelen date 1700. The pulpit allegorically represents the four continents sitting on a globe accompanied by their symbolic animals. They carry a tub in which the attributes of the evangelists and four medallions with Jesuit saints are chiseled. Two angels blowing trumpets support the sound board depicting the Holy Spirit. The didactic theme is obvious: faith is spreading across the world thanks to the Jesuits inspired by the Holy Spirit.

Many of his drawings have been preserved.

== Selected works ==
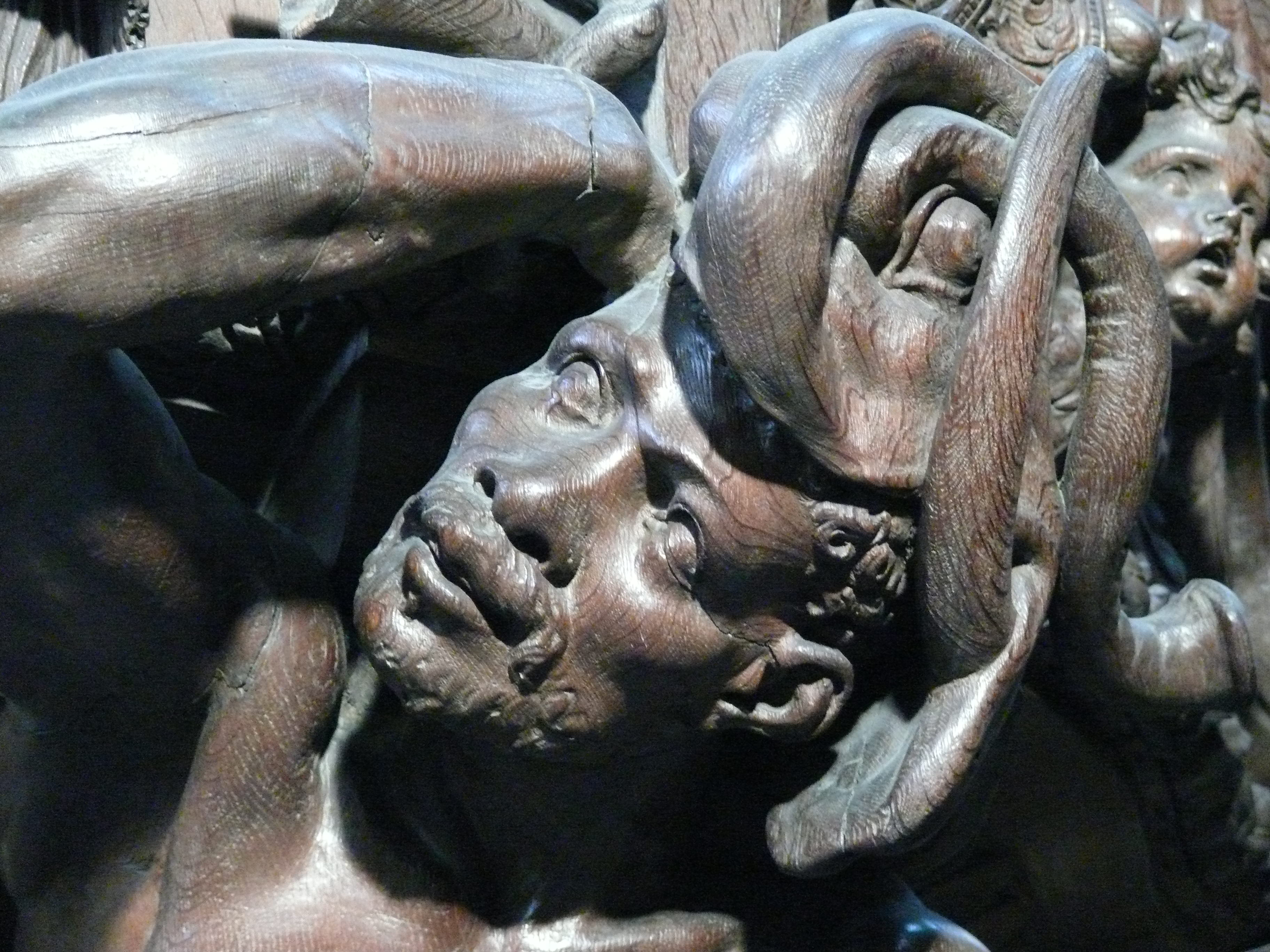
Detail of pulpit of the St Peter and Paul's Church in Mechelen

- 1676: Epitaph for Bishop Capello, Antwerp Cathedral
- 1680: Confessionals in St. Catherina Church in Sinaai, Sint-Niklaas
- 1686: Altar rails in the Sacrament Chapel of the Antwerp Cathedral
- 1694: Western outer portal of the St. James' Church Church in Antwerp
- 1695: White marble altar rails in the St. Walburga in Bruges
- 1696: Pulpit, Cathedral of Brussels (originally in the St Michael Church in Leuven)
- 1697: Pulpit in the St Augustine Church in Antwerp
- 1700: Pulpit and altar rails in St Peter and Paul's Church in Mechelen
- 1705–1709: high altar in the Saint Bavo Cathedral in Ghent
- 1720: Saint Servatius Altar in the Basilica of Saint Servatius in Grimbergen (attributed)
