= Petrus van den Eynde =

Dutch lithographer (1787–1840)

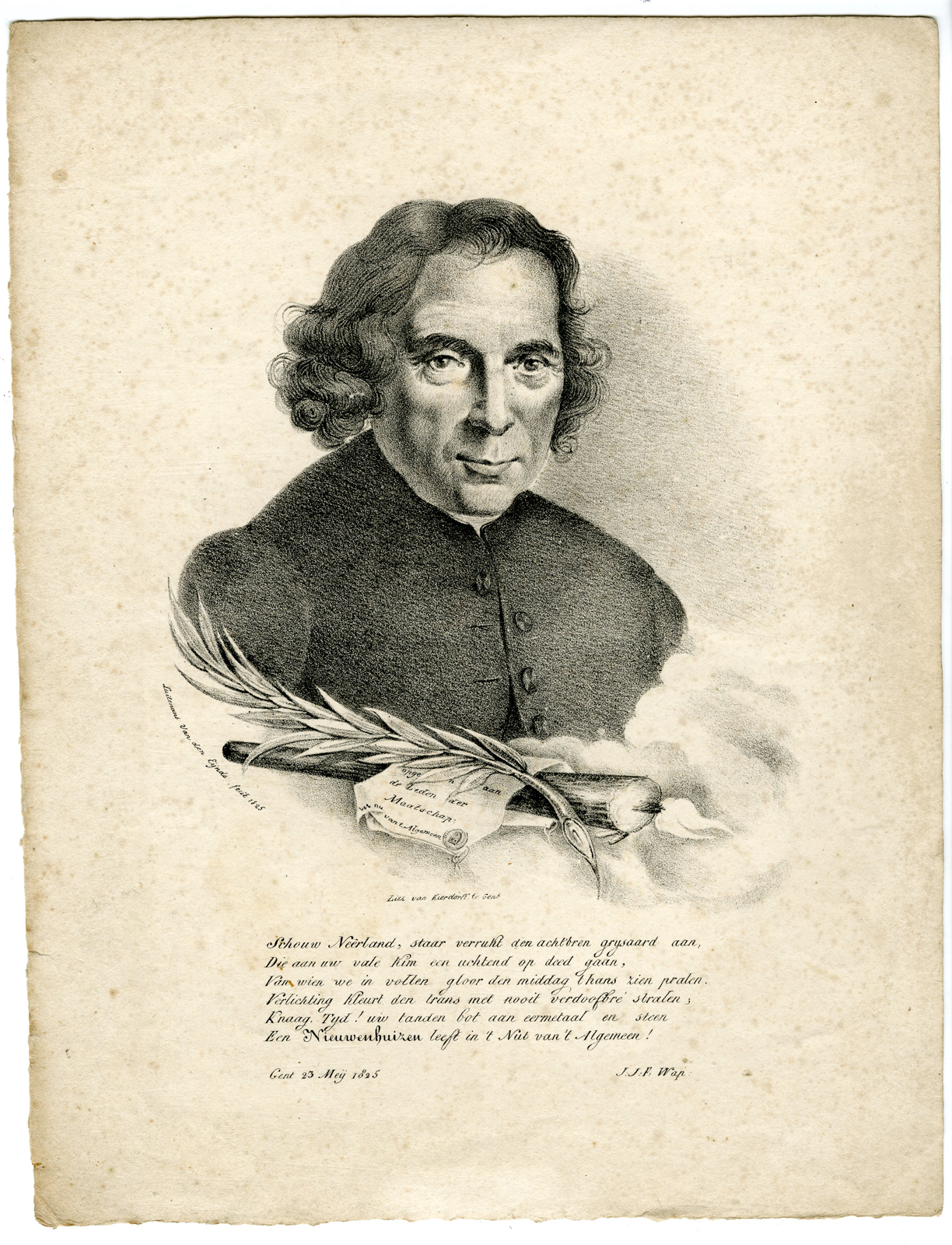
Portrait of Jan Nieuwenhuizen, 1827

Petrus van den Eynde (23 October 1787 – 5 April 1840) was a Dutch lithographer.

Van den Eynde was a captain in the infantry by profession, and an amateur lithographer, draftsman, and painter. Born in 1787 in Haarlem, he was active in Ghent and Haarlem from 1802 until 1840, the year of his death.

== Gallery ==
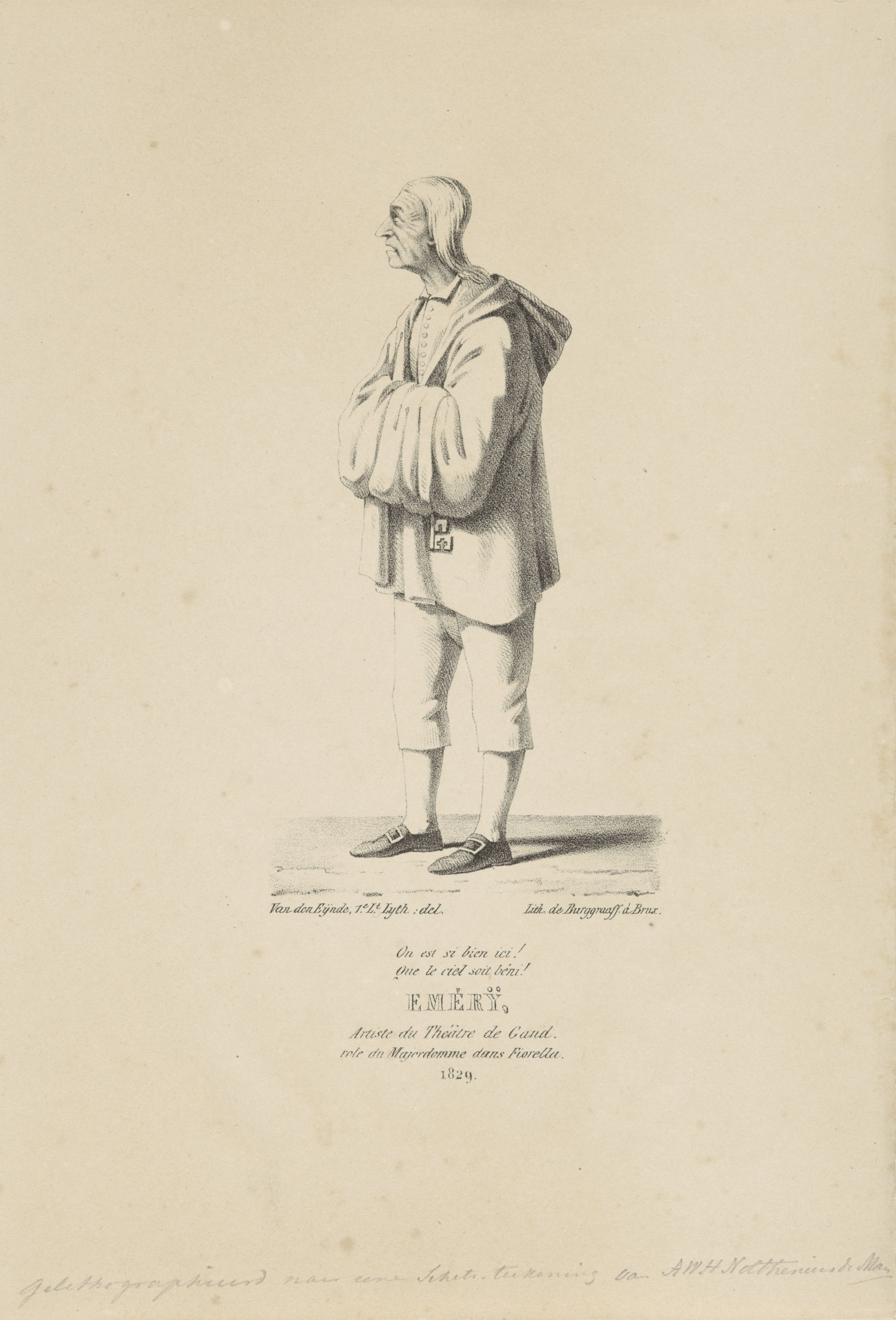
Portrait of the Actor Emerij, 1829

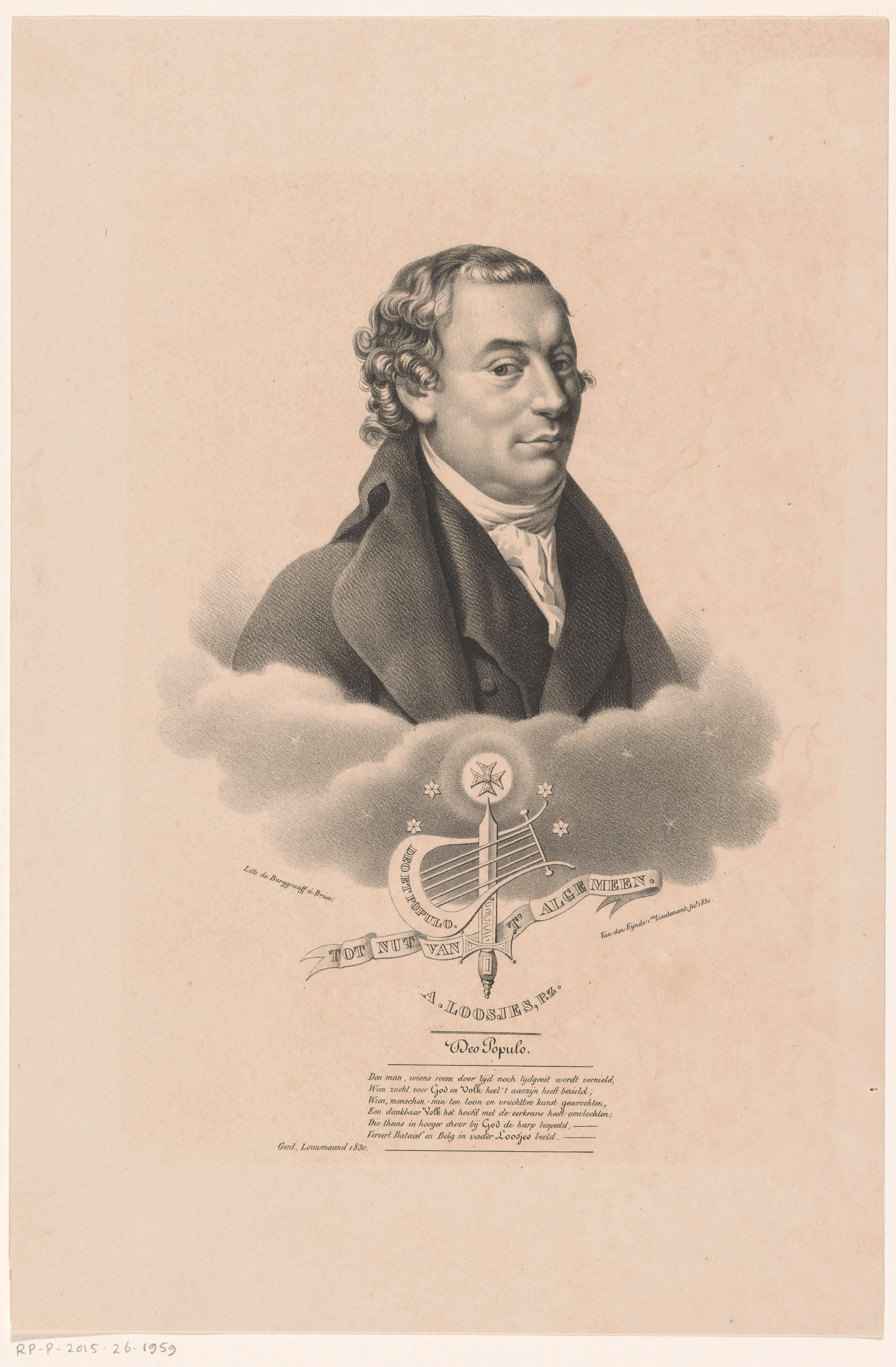
Portrait of Adriaan Pietersz. Loosjes, 1830

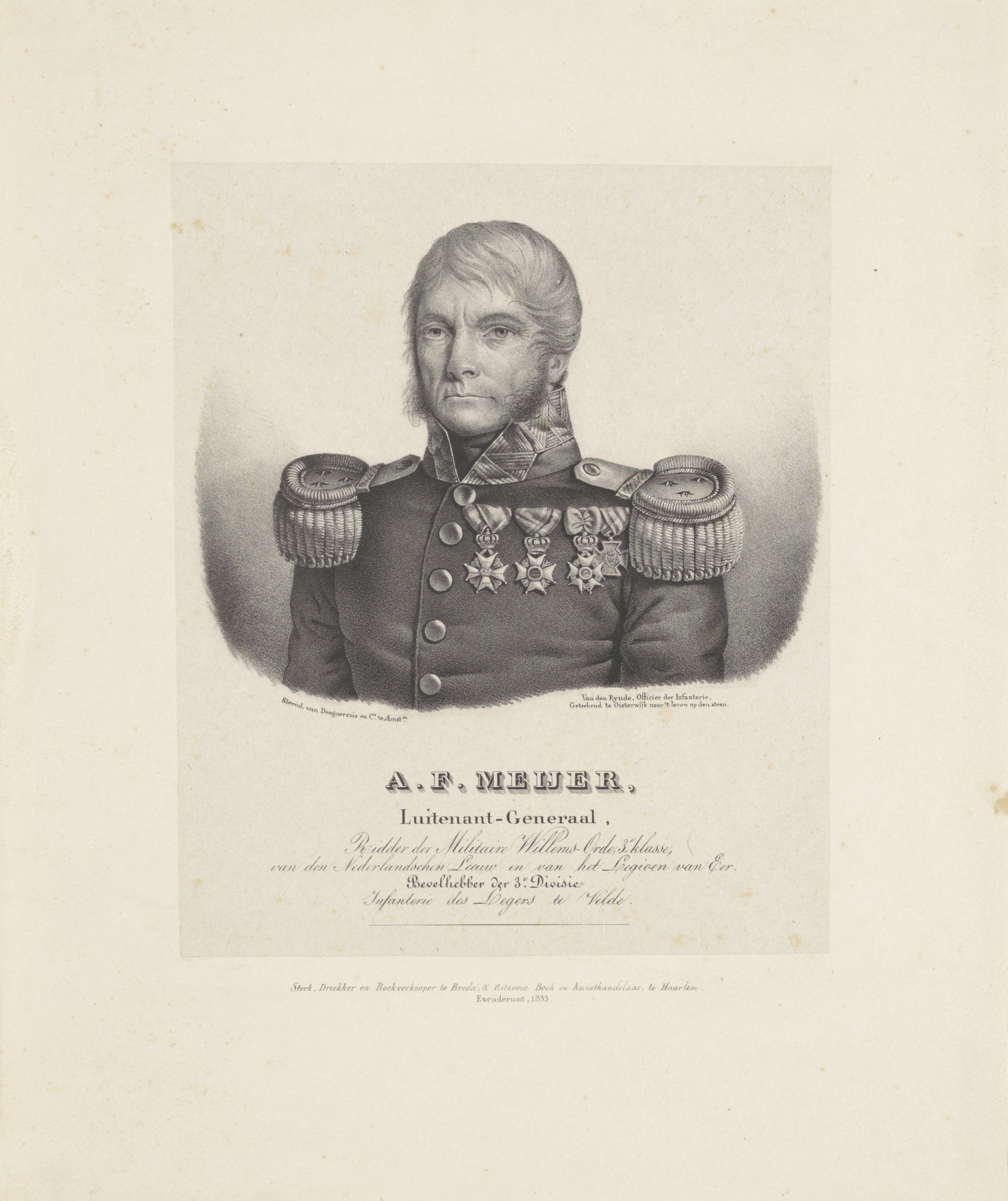
Portrait of Adrianus Frans Baron Meijer, 1833

== Sources ==
- Kramm, Christiaan, De levens en werken der Hollandsche en Vlaamsche kunstschilders, beeldhouwers, graveurs en bouwmeesters, van den vroegsten tot op onzen tijd... (Strekkende tevens tot vervolg op het werk van J. Immerzeel, Jr.), vol. 2 (1858), p. 470
- Thieme, Ulrich; Becker, Felix, Allgemeines Lexikon der bildenden Künstler: von der Antike bis zur Gegenwart, 1907-1950, vol. 11 (1915), p. 140
- Waller, F. G.; Juynboll, Willem R., Biographisch woordenboek van Noord Nederlandsche graveurs, 1938/1974, p. 97 (as Pieter van den Eynde)
- Scheen, Pieter A., Lexicon Nederlandse beeldende kunstenaars, 's-Gravenhage, 1969
- Scheen, Pieter A., Lexicon Nederlandse beeldende kunstenaars, 1750-1880, 1981, p. 144 (as: Eynde, Pieter (Petrus) van den)
- Jacobs, P.M.J.E., Beeldend Benelux: biografisch handboek, Tilburg: Stichting Studiecentrum voor beeldende kunst, 2000
- Beyer, Andreas; Savoy, Bénédicte; Tegethoff, Wolf; König, Eberhard, Allgemeines Künstlerlexikon: die bildenden Künstler aller Zeiten und Völker, vol. 35 (2003), p. 543
