= 1696 in art =

Events from the year 1696 in art.

== Events ==
A sculpture of a walking horse now attributed to Giovanni Francesco Susini (c. 1585 – c. 1653), is sold as a work by Susini's master Giambologna by the art dealer Marcus Forchondt in Antwerp to Prince Johann Adam Andreas I von Liechtenstein.

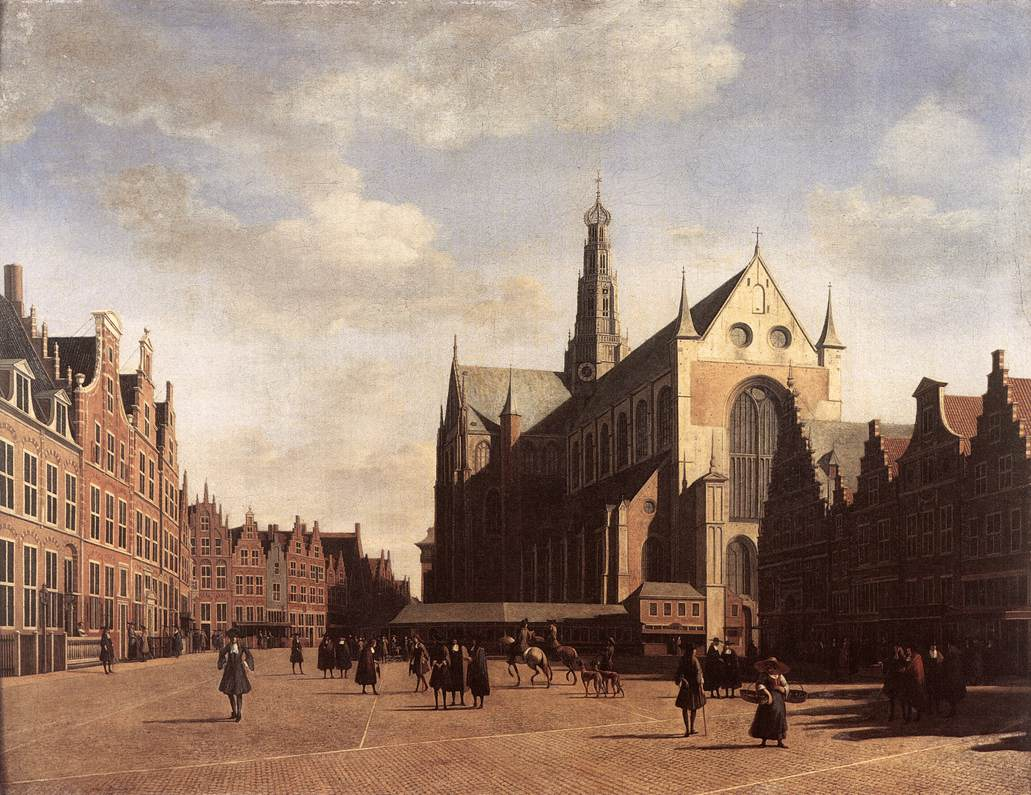
Berckheyde – The Market Square at Haarlem with the St. Bavo, Frans Hals Museum

== Paintings ==
- Gerrit Adriaenszoon Berckheyde – The Market Square at Haarlem with the St. Bavo
- Jacob de Heusch – River View with the Ponte Rotto (Brunswick Gallery, Romer)
- Jan Siberechts – View of a House and its Estate in Belsize, Middlesex

== Sculptures ==
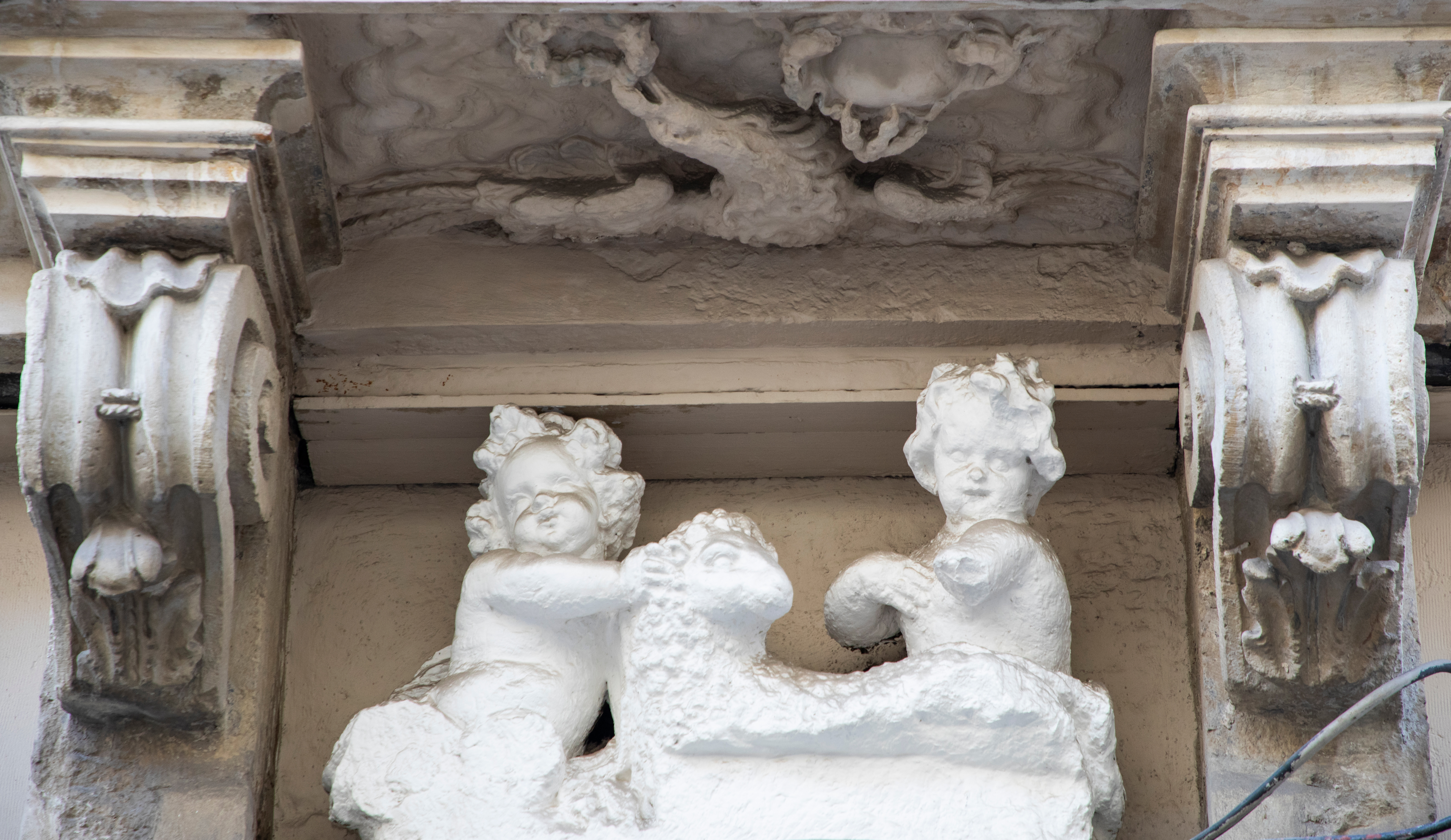
The White Lamb by Peter Van Dievoet, Brussels.

- Peter Van Dievoet - The White Lamb (Brussels)

== Births ==
- January 5 – Giuseppe Galli Bibiena, Italian designer/painter (died 1757)
- March – Joseph Anton Feuchtmayer, German Rococo stuccoist and sculptor (died 1770)
- March 5 – Giovanni Battista Tiepolo, Italian painter (died 1770)
- March 31 – Mattia Bortoloni, Italian Rococo painter (died 1750)
- date unknown
  - Laurent Delvaux, French sculptor (died 1778)
  - Kim Du-ryang, Korean genre works painter of the mid Joseon period (died 1763)
  - Li Fangying, Chinese painter from Jiangsu (died 1755)
  - Francesco de Mura, Italian painter of portraits and frescoes (died 1782)
  - August Querfurt, Austrian painter (died 1761)
  - Pieter Jan Snyers, Flemish painter (died 1757)
  - Jean-Joseph Vinache, French sculptor (died 1754)
  - Carlo Zimech, Maltese priest and painter (died 1766)
- probable
  - Roland Paradis, silversmith (died 1754)
  - 1696/1697: Gerard Vandergucht, English born engraver and art dealer (died 1776)

== Deaths ==
- July 22 – Hendrik van Minderhout, Dutch seascape painter (born 1632)
- December 13 – Georg Matthäus Vischer, cartographer, topographer and engraver (born 1628)
- date unknown
  - Gian Pietro Bellori, Italian painter, antiquarian and biographer of artists (born 1613)
  - Esteban Márquez de Velasco, Spanish Baroque painter (born 1652)
  - Charles Philippe Dieussart, Dutch architect and sculptor (born 1625)
  - Jean Baptiste Mathey, French architect and painter (born 1630)
  - Emilio Taruffi, Italian painter of canvases and altarpieces who was assassinated (born 1633)
- probable
  - Dirck Helmbreker, Dutch Baroque painter and draughtsman (born 1633)
  - Jacob Huysmans, Flemish portrait painter (born 1633)
  - Jan Vermeer van Utrecht, Dutch Golden Age painter (born 1630)
