= Sculpture in Brussels =

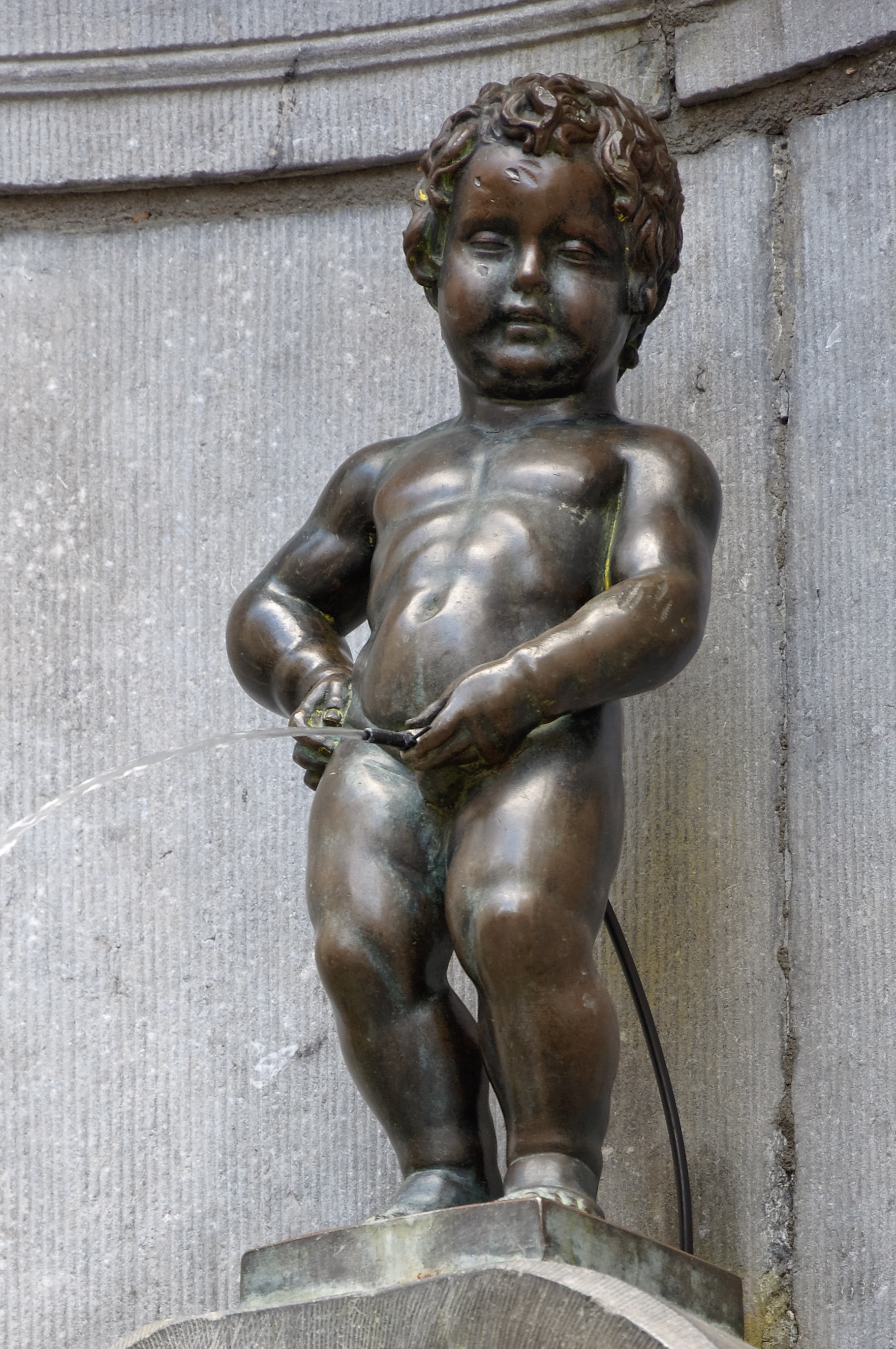
Manneken Pis, original bronze statue by Jérôme Duquesnoy, 1619. The one at the junction of the Rue de l'Étuve/Stoofstraat and the Rue du Chêne/Eikstraat is a replica from 1965.

Sculpture in Brussels has been created from the Middle Ages to the present day. The city has been an uninterrupted centre of autonomous training in the art of sculpture and has produced a long continuity of sculptors who were born and trained in Brussels or who came there to train. This style or school is sometimes referred to as the Brussels school of sculpture (French: École de sculpture bruxelloise; Dutch: Brusselse beeldhouwschool).

Brussels' sculpture began to shine in the second half of the 14th century with Claus Sluter's arrival in the city and the construction of the Town Hall. It continued without interruption and reached its momentum during 15th and 16th centuries. Until the end of the Ancien Régime, sculptors in Brussels were members of the Quatre Couronnés Guild of the Nation of St Nicholas and then the Royal Academy of Fine Arts.

== History ==
Brussels' sculpture began to assert itself in the second half of the 14th century with the arrival of the Dutch sculptor Claus Sluter, who was probably trained in the city, (Note: The name "Claes de Slutere van Herlam" is inscribed in the Register of the Corporation of Stonemasons and Sculptors of Brussels around the years 1379/1380.) and who lived there from 1380 to 1385, before settling in Dijon, France. The art reached its momentum during the 15th and 16th centuries thanks to uninterrupted corporate training.

Around 1500, the most notable sculptors of altarpieces were the Borreman(s) (notably Jan Borreman the Elder and the Younger, and Passchier Borreman). Among the sculptors who benefited most from the cultural policy of the Archdukes Albert VII and Isabella were the Antwerp-born Robrecht Colyns de Nole and the Brussels-born Jérôme Duquesnoy the Elder (best known for his Manneken Pis).

Until the end of the Ancien Régime, the training of sculptors in Brussels took place mainly within the framework of the Quatre Couronnés Guild of the Nation of St Nicholas, and was later taken up by the Royal Academy of Fine Arts. Brussels, alongside Mechelen and Antwerp, played a dynamic role in the field of sculpture in the former Southern Netherlands. The archives bear witness to the existence of numerous active workshops training apprentices. The sculptors of Leuven were also influenced by those of Brussels.

== Sculptors ==
Among the sculptors born in Brussels or who were active there, one can mention: Jan Borreman (fl. 1479–1520), Jérôme Duquesnoy the Elder (1570?–1641?), François Duquesnoy (1597–1643), Jérôme Duquesnoy the Younger (baptised 1602–1654), Jan van Delen (1635/1636–1703), Jan Cosijn (1646–1708), Cornelis van Nerven (c. 1660–1715), Marc de Vos (1650–1717), Peter van Dievoet (1661–1729), Jan de Kinder (1675–1739), Pierre-Denis Plumier (1688–1721), Jacques Bergé (1693–1756), François Lejeune (1721–1790), Jean-Baptiste Fleuriot-Lescot (1761–1794, guillotined), and Gilles-Lambert Godecharle (1750−1835).

== Gallery ==
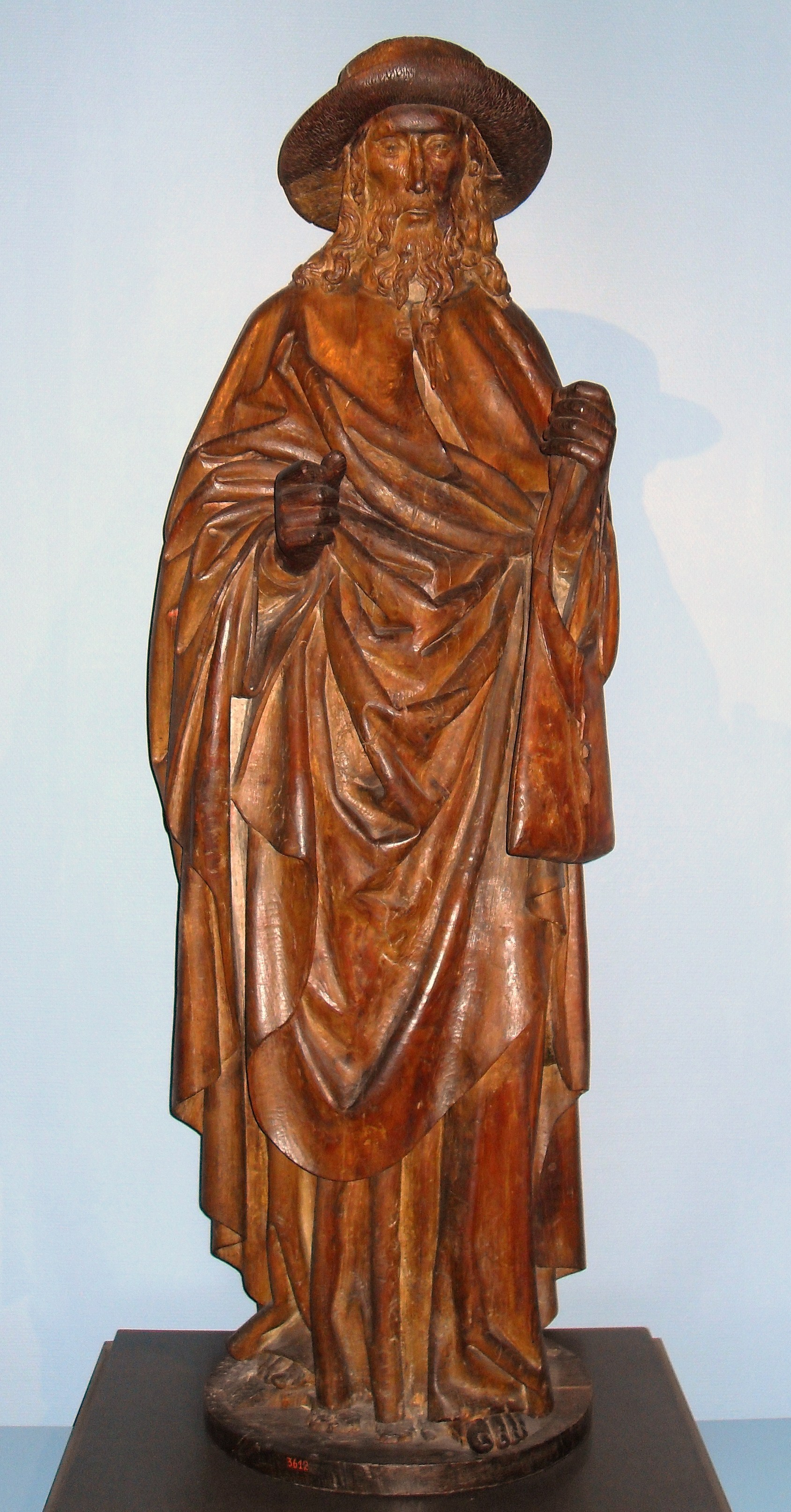
Saint James the Great, wood sculpture by an unknown author, 15th century, now in the Art & History Museum

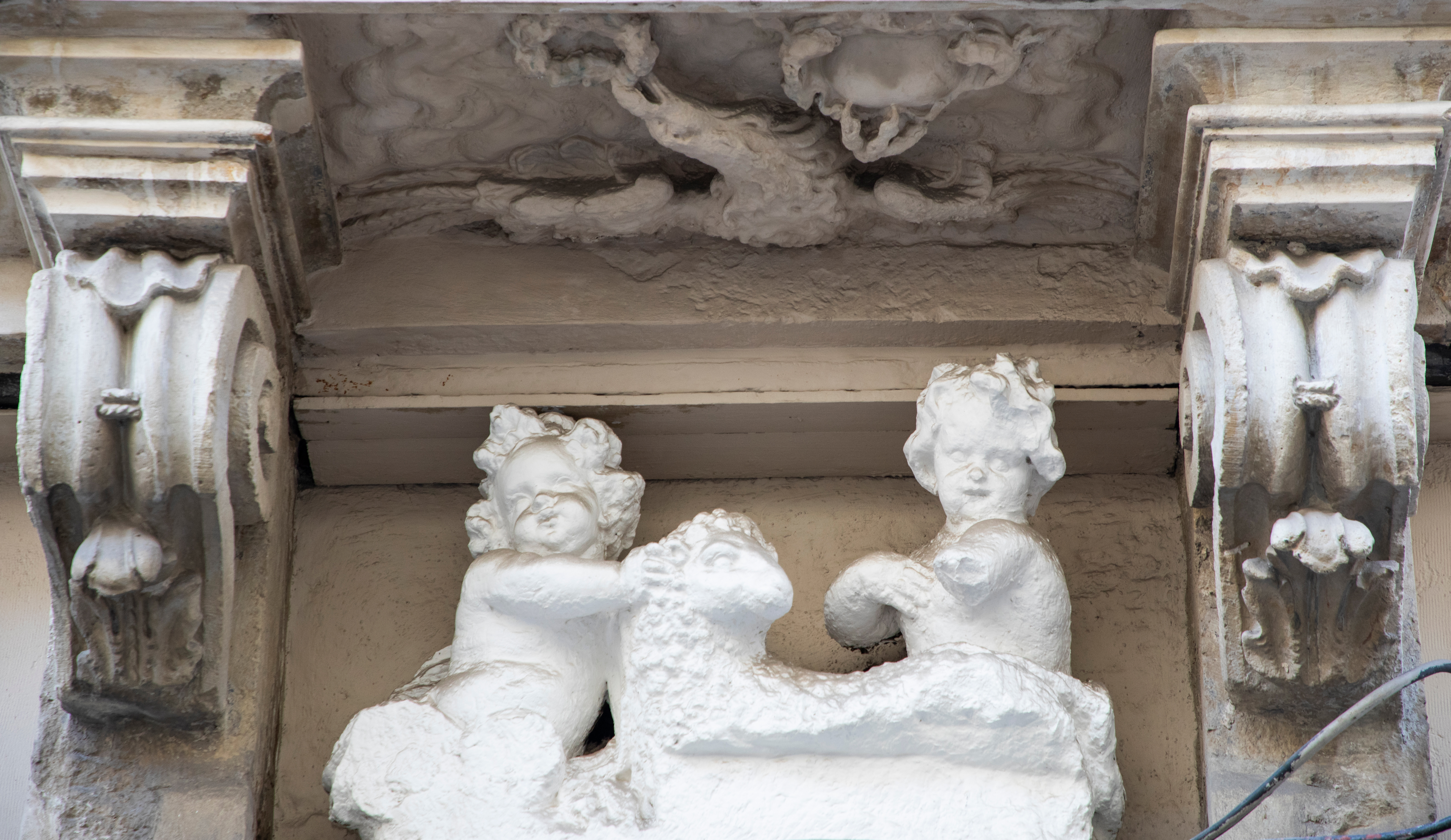
The White Lamb, by Peter van Dievoet, Maison de l'Agneau Blanc, Rue du Marché aux Herbes/Grasmarkt, 1696

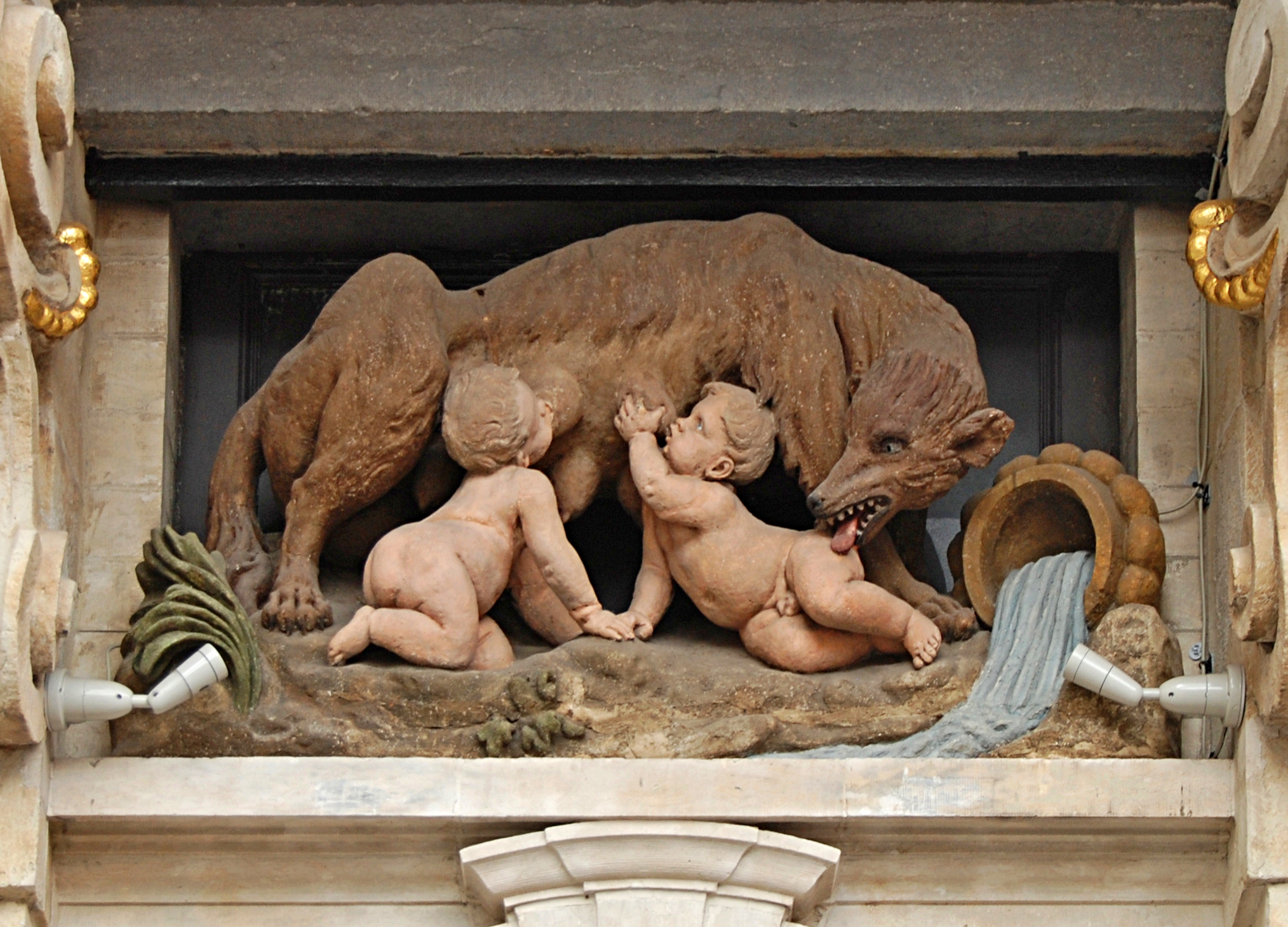
Romulus and Remus being suckled by the she-wolf, by Marc de Vos, La Louve (Den Wolf or Den Wolvin) guildhall, Grand-Place/Grote Markt, 1696

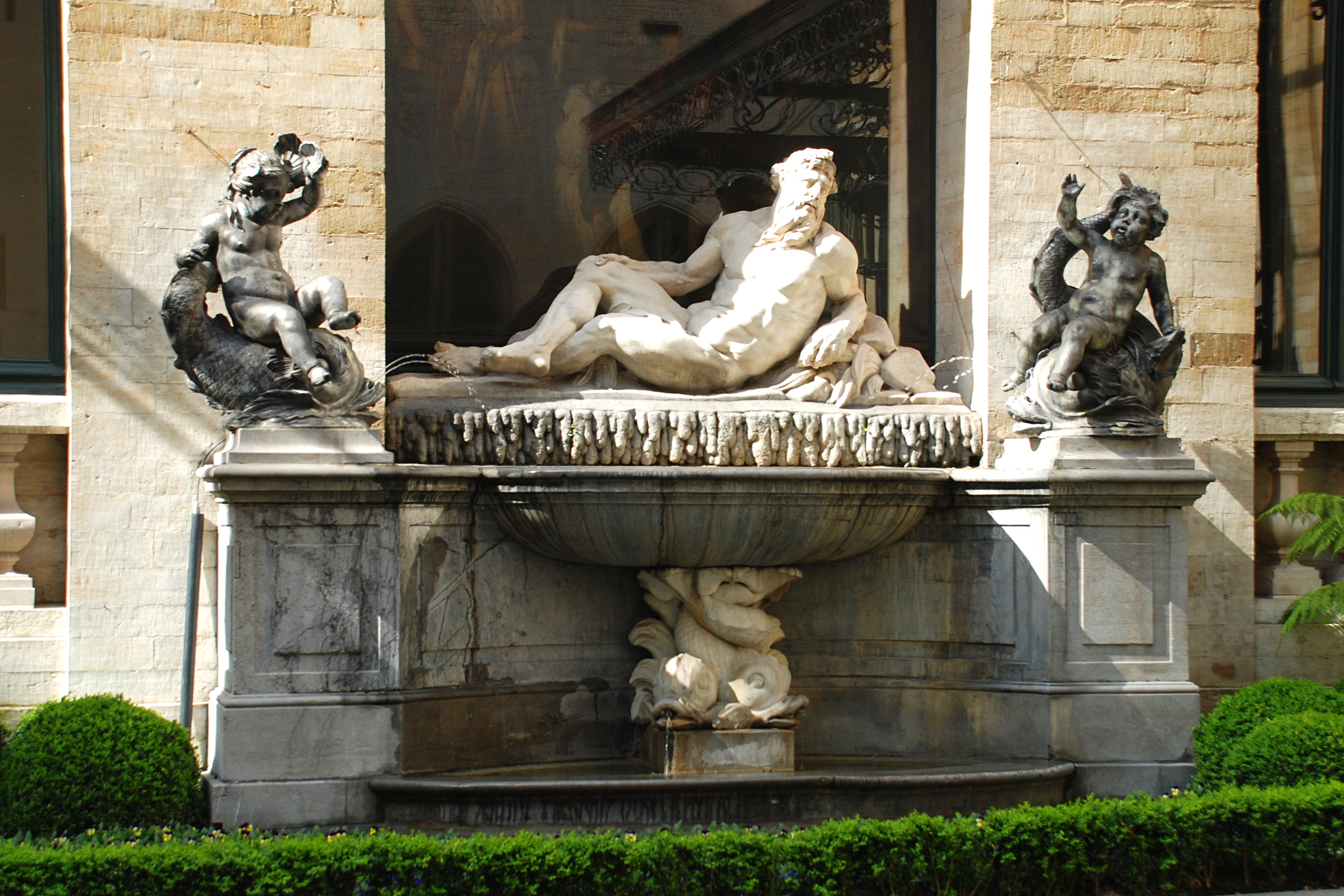
The Scheldt, by Pierre-Denis Plumier, courtyard of Brussels' Town Hall, 1715

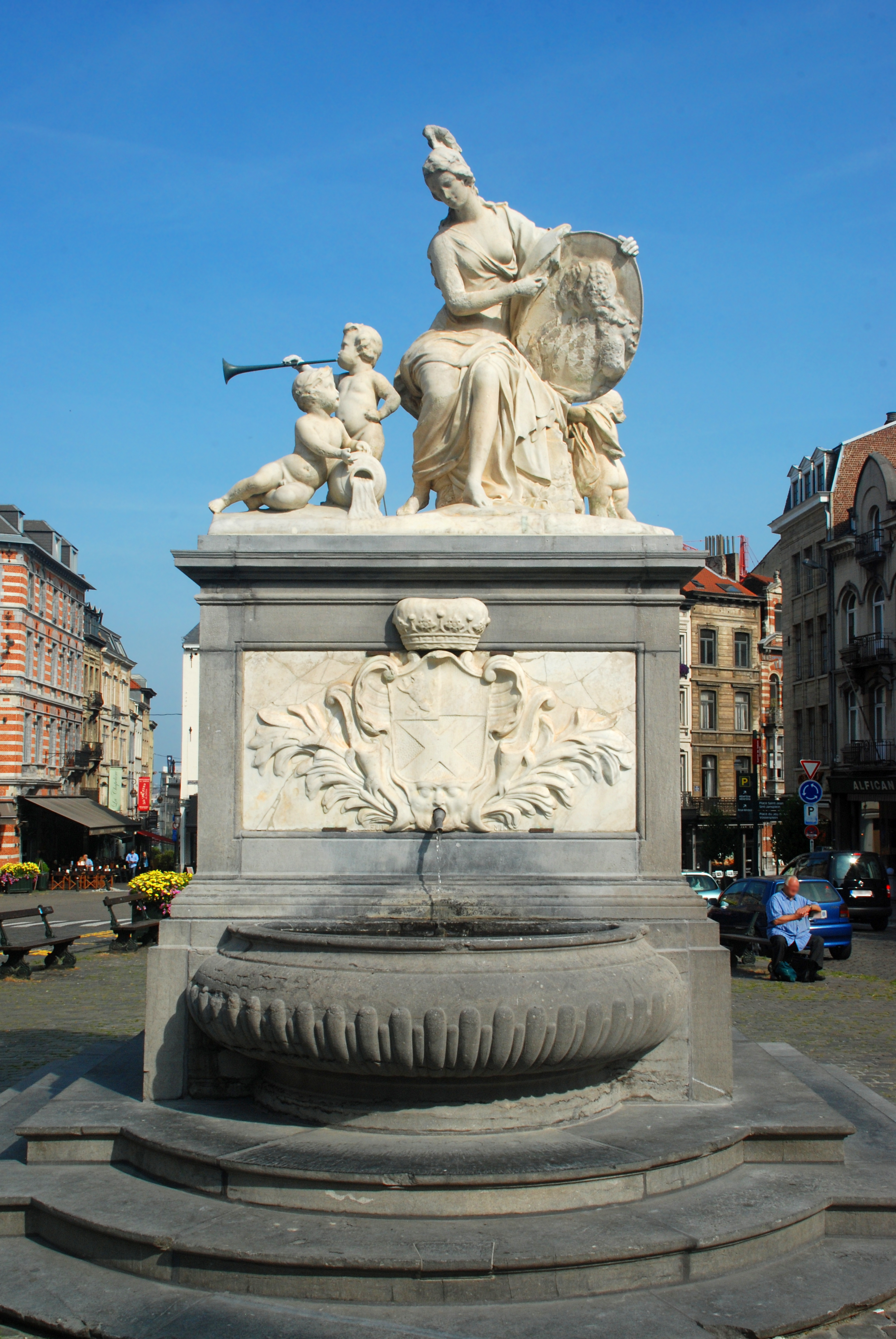
Fountain of Minerva, by Jacques Bergé, Square du Grand Sablon/Grote Zavelsquare, 1751

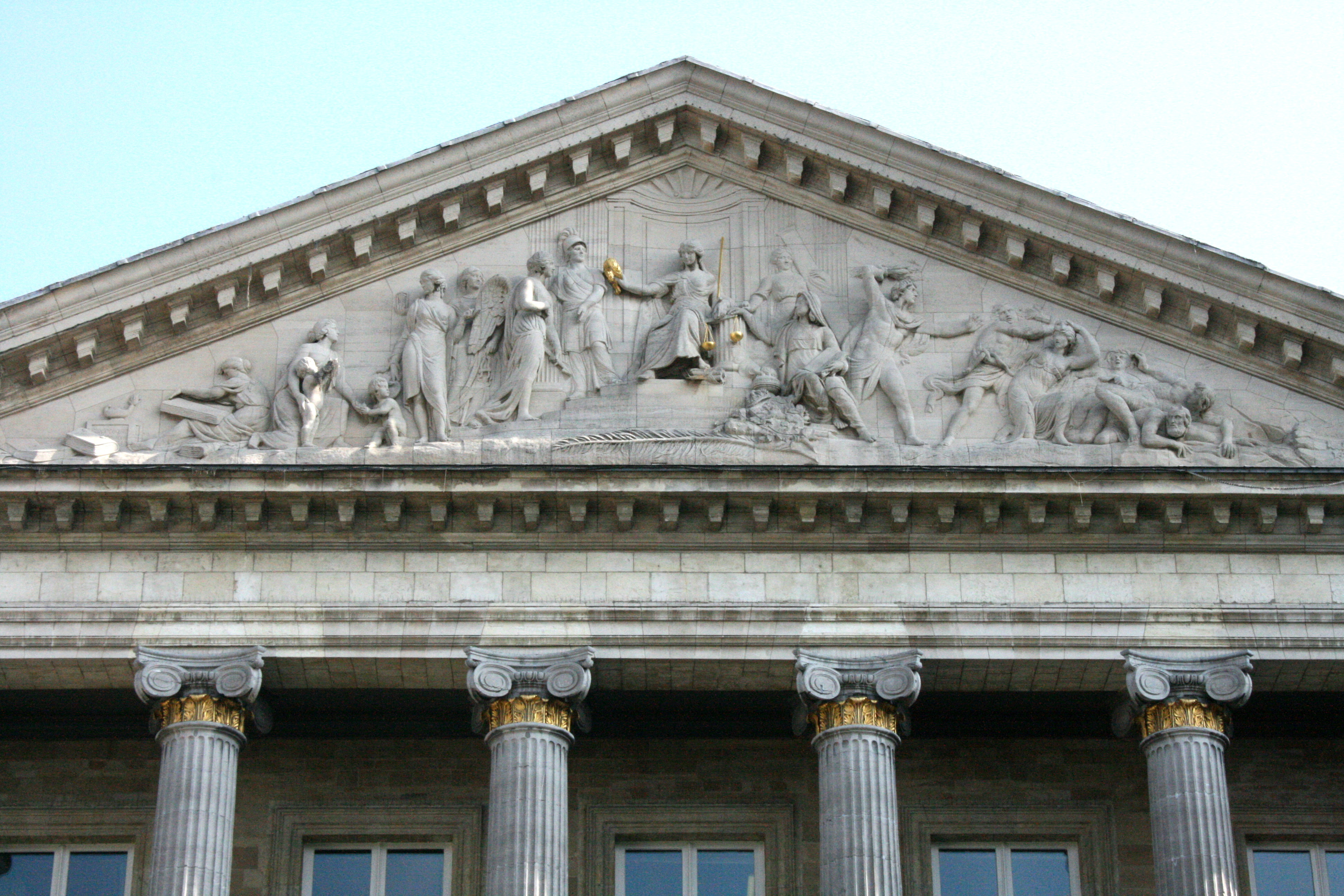
Justice punishing Vices and rewarding Virtues, by Gilles-Lambert Godecharle, pediment of the Palace of the Nation, Rue de la Loi/Wetstraat, 1781–82

== See also ==
- Guilds of Brussels
- History of Brussels
- Culture of Belgium
