= Privy Garden of the Palace of Whitehall =

Part of the Palace of Whitehall, London

Coordinates: 51.503841°N 0.124894°W

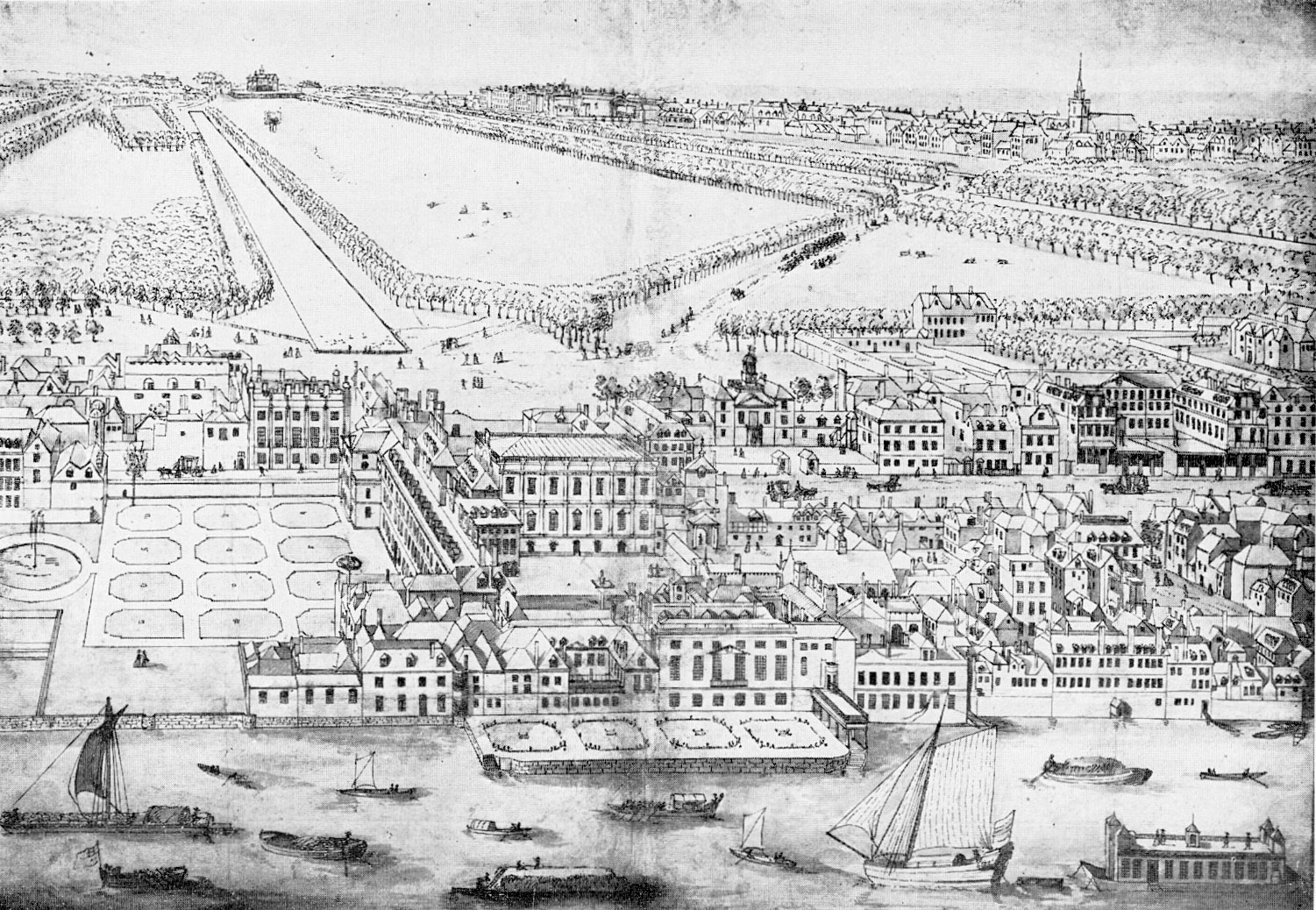
Depiction of the Palace of Whitehall by Leonard Knijff, with the Privy Garden visible on the left, c.1695

The Privy Garden of the Palace of Whitehall was a large enclosed space in Westminster, London, that was originally a pleasure garden used by the late Tudor and Stuart monarchs of England. It was created under Henry VIII and was expanded and improved under his successors, but lost its royal patronage after the Palace of Whitehall was almost totally destroyed by fire in 1698.

From the start of the 18th century onwards, the garden went through major changes as it fell into neglect. It was painted in 1747 by Canaletto during a period of transition, as Westminster was being transformed by the construction of new buildings and roads. By the start of the 19th century, it had been redeveloped as the site for a row of townhouses, some of which were occupied by prime ministers seeking homes near the government buildings nearby. The last remnants of the Privy Garden were destroyed in 1938 during the construction of government offices on the site of the present Ministry of Defence Main Building.

== Origins and layout ==
The Privy Garden originated in the 16th century as part of the estate of York Place; Cardinal Wolsey's London residence. The estate already had a privy, or private, garden that was located behind what is now the Banqueting House. An orchard, which was part of the estate, adjoined it to the south. When Henry VIII seized York Place, he bought more land to the south of the orchard to expand the estate. The old privy garden was cobbled over and later became known as the Pebble Court, while the orchard was converted into a new and much larger Privy Garden, known at first as the "great garden". At the time, Westminster was not heavily built up as it is now, and York Place – later renamed Whitehall Palace – lay within a suburban area dominated by parks and gardens. St. James's Park, across the other side of Whitehall, was a royal hunting ground.

Henry's garden was very ornately decorated, as 16th-century visitors noted. The Spanish 3rd Duke of Nájera wrote of a visit in 1544 in which he saw "a very pleasant garden with great walks and avenues in all directions, containing many sculptures of men and women, children and birds and monsters, and other strange figures in low and high relief." Von Wedel recorded in 1584 that in the garden were "thirty-four high columns, covered with various fine paintings; also different animals carved in wood, with their horns gilt, are set on the top of the columns, together with flags bearing the queen's arms. In the middle of the garden is a nice fountain with a remarkable sun-dial, showing the time in thirty different ways. Between the spaces that are planted in the garden there are fine walks grown with grass, and the spaces are planted very artistically, surrounded by plants in the shape of seats."

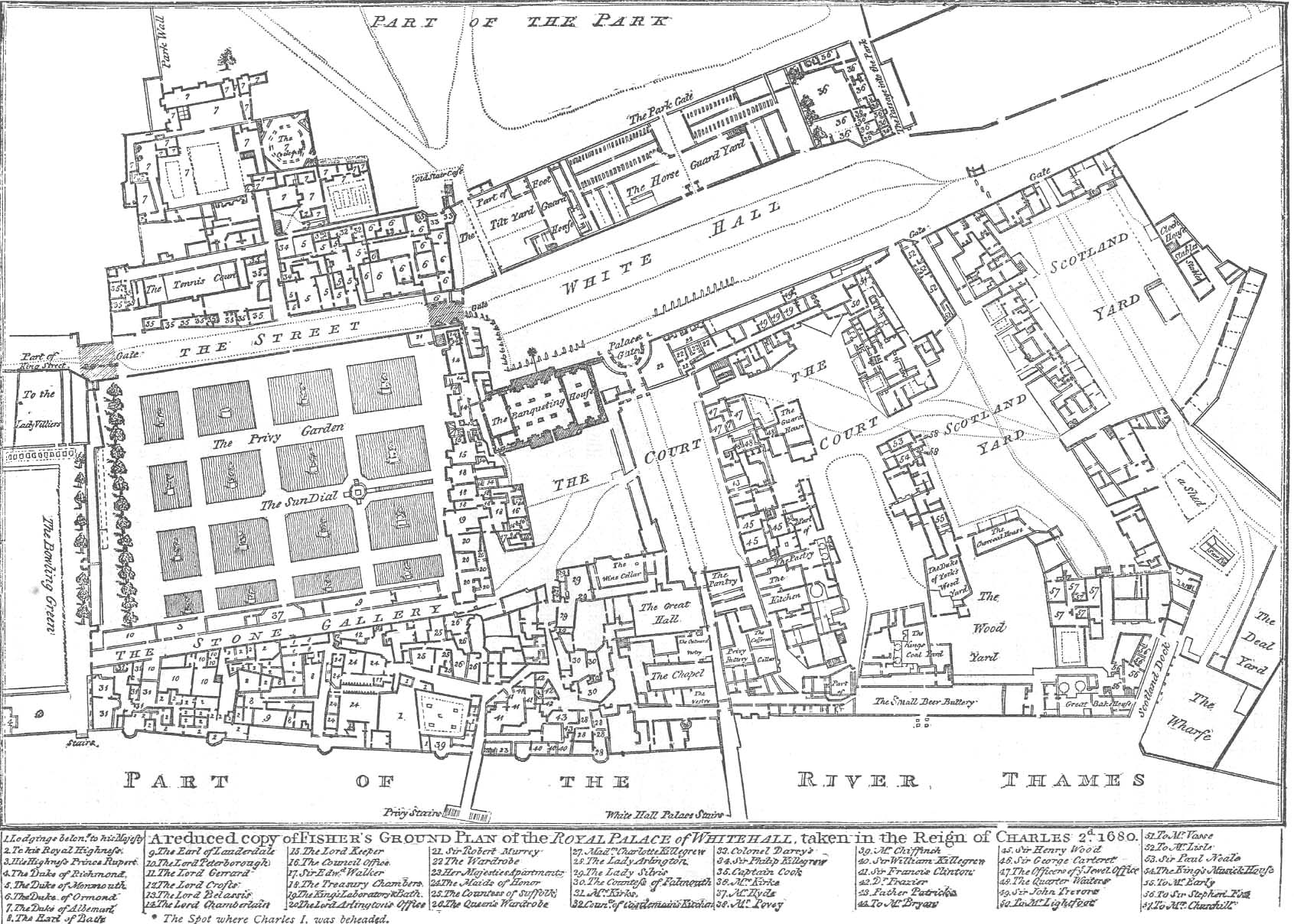
Map of the Palace of Whitehall, showing the Privy Garden, dating from 1680

The earliest surviving depiction of the garden, from 1670, shows a very different layout. By this time the garden had been redesigned in a grid pattern with sixteen squares of grass separated by paths. The relentless expansion of the Palace of Whitehall, which was by now a sprawling jumble of structures, had hemmed in the Privy Garden behind walls and buildings on all sides. A high wall to the west separated it from The Street, the main thoroughfare at the south end of Whitehall that bisected the palace in a north-south direction. To the north, a range of buildings occupied by high-ranking courtiers separated it from the Pebble Court that lay behind the Banqueting House, while to the east the Stone Gallery and state apartments, used by the king's closest courtiers, blocked it off from the River Thames. The royal apartments were off the Stone Gallery and had a view of the Privy Garden, with a screen in place to prevent passers-by from seeing the naked king in his 7 by 7 feet (2.1 by 2.1 m) bathtub. A row of trees on the south side screened it from the Bowling Green, which had been an orchard in Henry VIII's time but was converted for leisure use after the Restoration. A terrace also separated the Privy Garden from the Bowling Green, but this was removed in 1673–4 and part of the Bowling Green was added to the garden.

The Privy Garden was originally created as a private royal pleasure garden and continued to serve a similar purpose during the Interregnum (1649–1660), when the English Council of State put considerable effort and money into repairing and improving the garden. They appear to have reserved it exclusively for their own use, with their own individual keys for access. By Samuel Pepys' time, after the Stuart Restoration, it had become "a through-passage, and common." The wall that enclosed the garden was often used by ballad-sellers to display their wares to passers-by, and courtiers used it to air their laundry. Pepys recorded his titillation at the sight of the underwear of Charles II's mistress, Lady Castlemaine, hanging out to dry in the Privy Garden. A century later, James Boswell wrote in his diary that he had taken a prostitute into the garden and "indulged sensuality", but he was shocked to find when he got home that she had stolen his handkerchief.

== Sculptures and other features ==
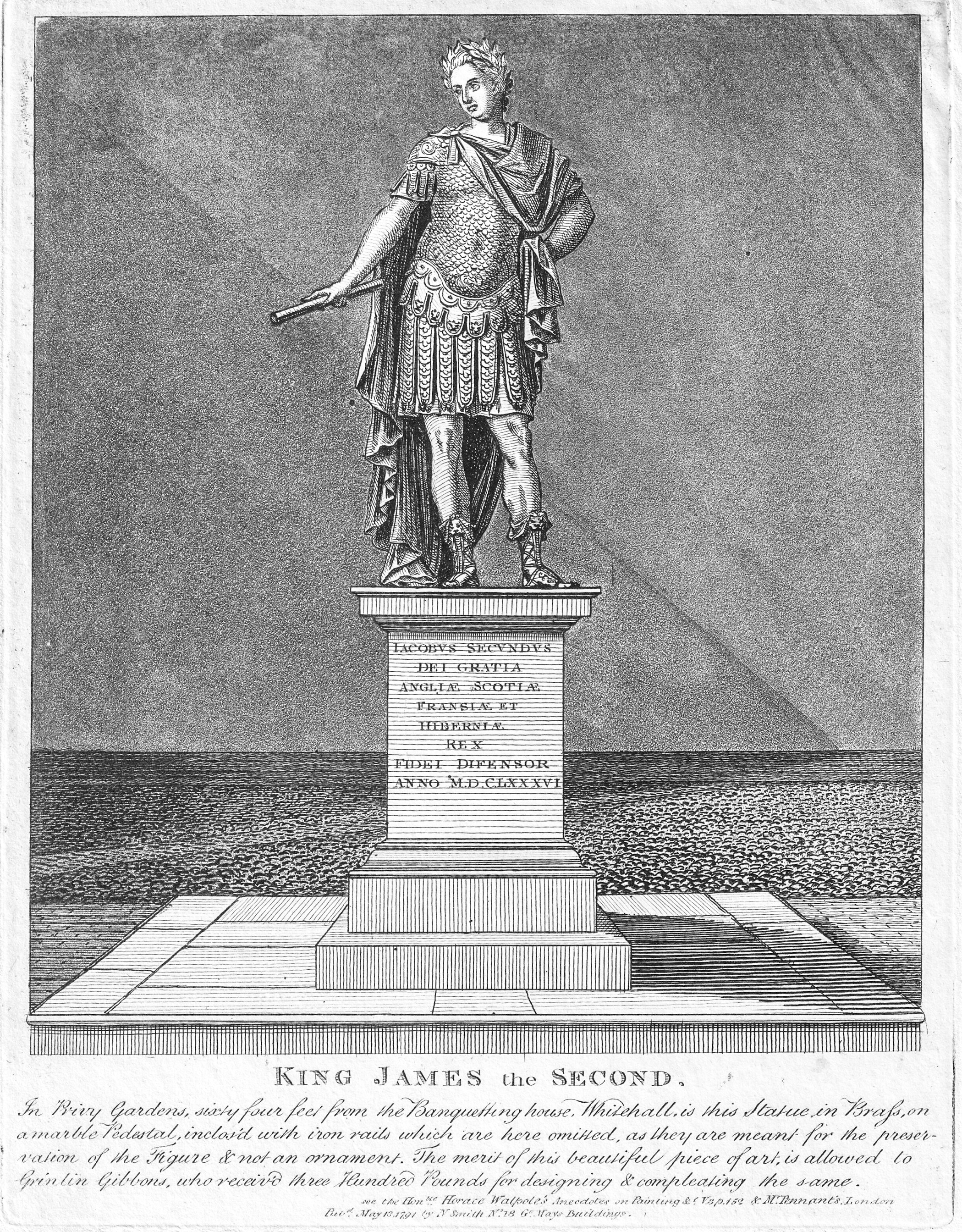
1791 engraving of the statue of King James II sculpted by Peter Van Dievoet and Laurens van der Meulen when it still stood of the grounds of the Whitehall Privy Garden. It now stands in front of the National Gallery.

For a time, each of the grass squares in the garden had a statue in its centre, standing on its own pedestal. They were probably moved there from St James's Palace in the 1650s but became the target of Puritan zealotry during the Interregnum, due to the perception that they were biblically prohibited "graven images". A woman named Mary Netherway wrote to Oliver Cromwell to demand that they be taken down, demanding that he "demolish those monsters which are set up as ornaments in [the] privy garden, for whilst they stand, though you see no evil in them, yet there is much evil in it, for whilst the crosses and altars of the idols remained untaken away in Jerusalem, the wrath of God continued against Israel." One man took more direct action; it was recorded in 1659 that "about this time there was a cook that lived by the Palace Gate, Westminster, that in Sermon time went into Whitehall Garden, and with him carried a smith's great hammer; he broke there those goodly statue of brass and marble, which report said they were the neatest made and the best workmanship in Europe, in half an hour's time [he] did above £500 worth of hurt."

The statues were eventually taken down when Charles II came to the throne and were either repaired or replaced. The bronze statue of James II by Peter van Dievoet, depicting the king wearing the robes of a Roman emperor, stood just outside the garden in the Pebble Court from 1686 to 1898 (with a short interruption during the Glorious Revolution). It now occupies a spot in Trafalgar Square outside the National Gallery.

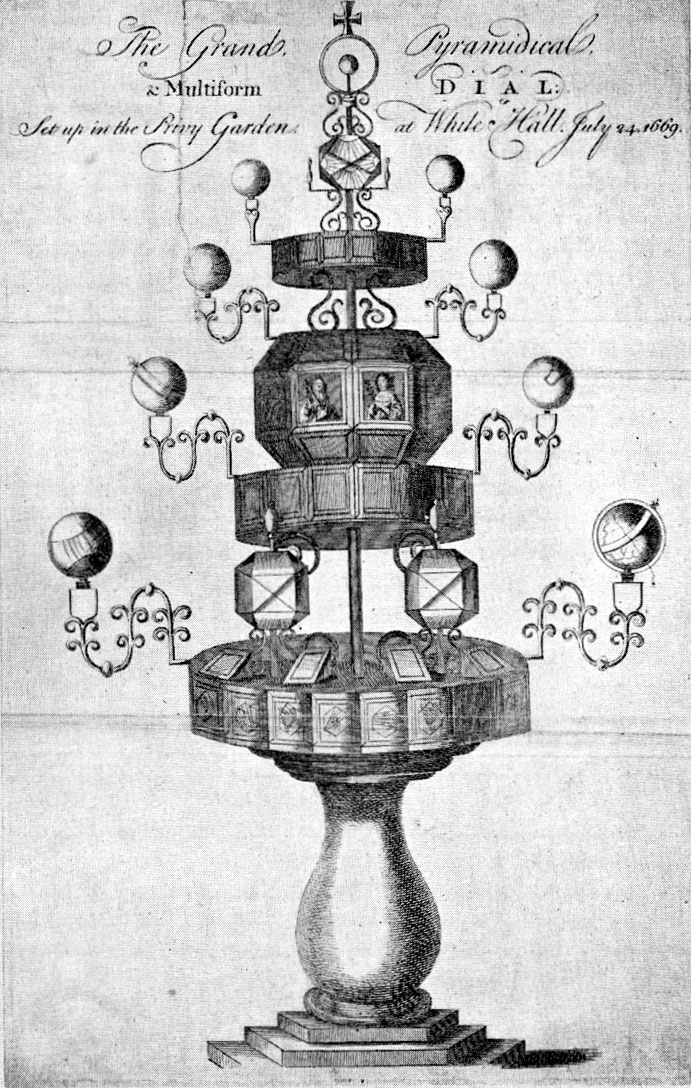
Charles II's sundial, installed in the Privy Garden in 1669

A large sundial, set up on the orders of James I, stood in the middle of the garden from 1624. The dial was designed by Edmund Gunter, professor of astronomy at Gresham College. It consisted of a large stone pedestal with four dials at the four corners and "the great horizontal concave" in the centre, with east, west, north and south dials at the sides. It was subsequently vandalised, allegedly by an intoxicated courtier, and fell into ruin in Charles II's reign. Andrew Marvell lamented that

This place for a dial was too insecure
Since a guard and a garden could not it defend;
For so near to the Court they will never endure
Any witness to show how their time they misspend.

In 1669 a new King's Sun Dial was erected for Charles II, designed by Father Francis Hall, a Jesuit priest. It was an extremely elaborate construction that Hall detailed in a book, Explication of the Diall, that he published in 1673 to explain how it operated. It stood 3 metres (9.8 ft) high and was constructed of stone, brass and wood, with gilded ironwork and painted glass panels to accompany its 270 component dials. It resembled "a fountain of glass spheres, or a giant candelabrum with tiered, branching arms ending in crystal globes", which showed not only the hours of the day but "many things also belonging to geography, astrology, and astronomy, by the sun's shadow made visible to the eye."

The King was fascinated by astronomy; his personal association with the science was illustrated by the fact that the sundial was not only his personal pride and joy but was also designed to serve as a symbol of the Stuart family. It had glass portraits mounted on it, depicting Charles, Queen Catherine, the Duke of York, the Queen Mother and Prince Rupert. A watchman was posted to guard it against the kind of vandalism that had wrecked the earlier sundial, but in June 1675 it was severely damaged when it was attacked by John Wilmot, 2nd Earl of Rochester, much to the king's fury. The fate of the ruined dial is unknown; it was last recorded standing at Buckingham House (later Buckingham Palace) in 1710.

== From Privy Garden to Whitehall Gardens ==
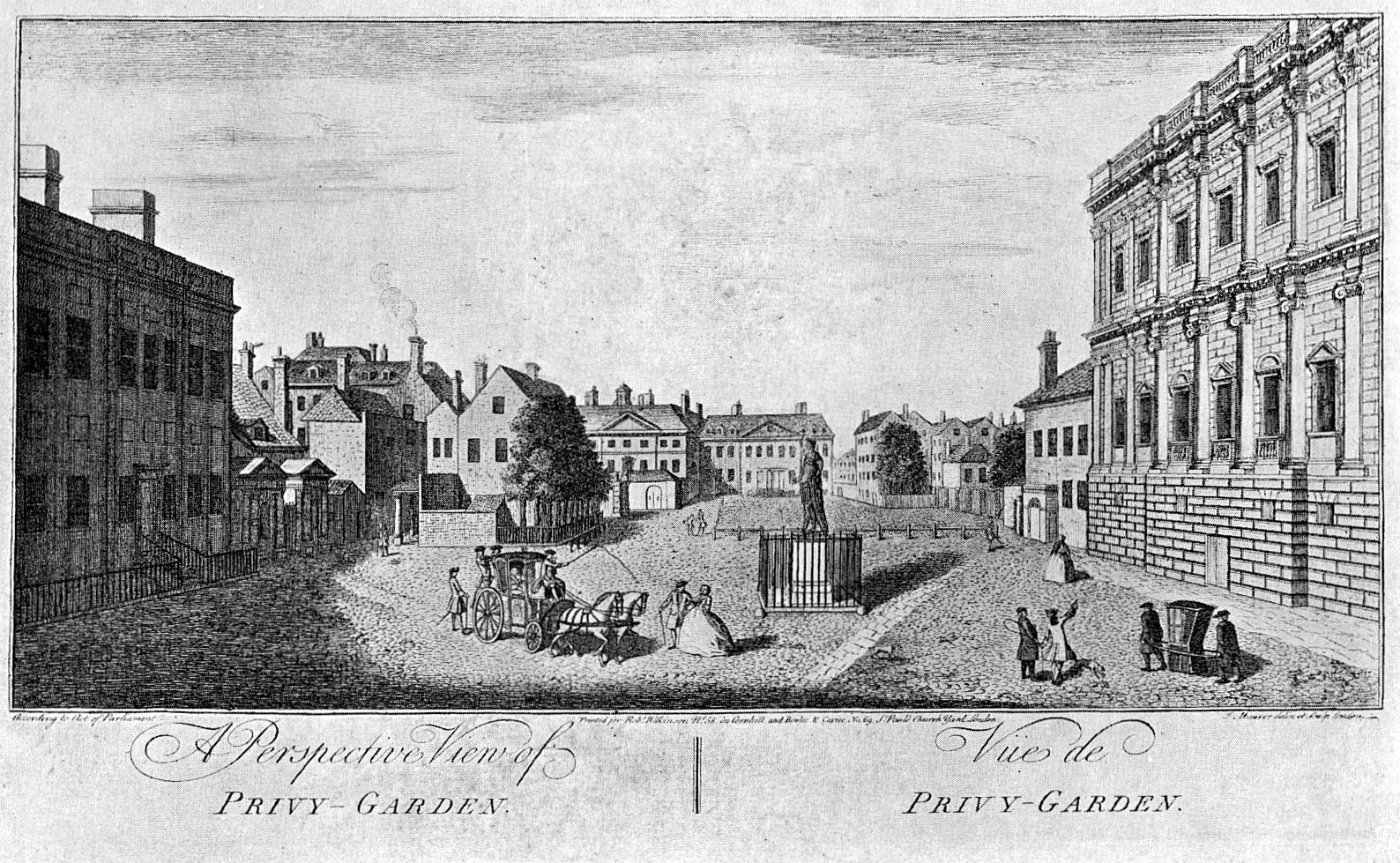
The Privy Garden depicted in 1741 by J. Maurier, looking south from the Banqueting House (visible on the right)

After the destruction by fire of the Palace of Whitehall in 1698, the surroundings of the Privy Garden changed dramatically. Most of the palace buildings had been burned down in the 1698 fire; others were torn down as the last vestiges of the old Tudor and Stuart Palace were removed. With the demise of the Privy Gallery, the Privy Garden was extended north to include the Pebble Court behind the Banqueting House.

The garden remained in Crown ownership but it became neglected and filthy with the departure of the monarchy from Whitehall. In 1733 the Duke of Richmond and other residents of the surviving properties adjoining the garden petitioned that they be allowed to lease the "void ground" of the garden. The Crown agreed, and in 1734 most of the garden was leased to the Dukes of Richmond and Montagu, the Earl of Loudon and Sir Conyers Darcy.

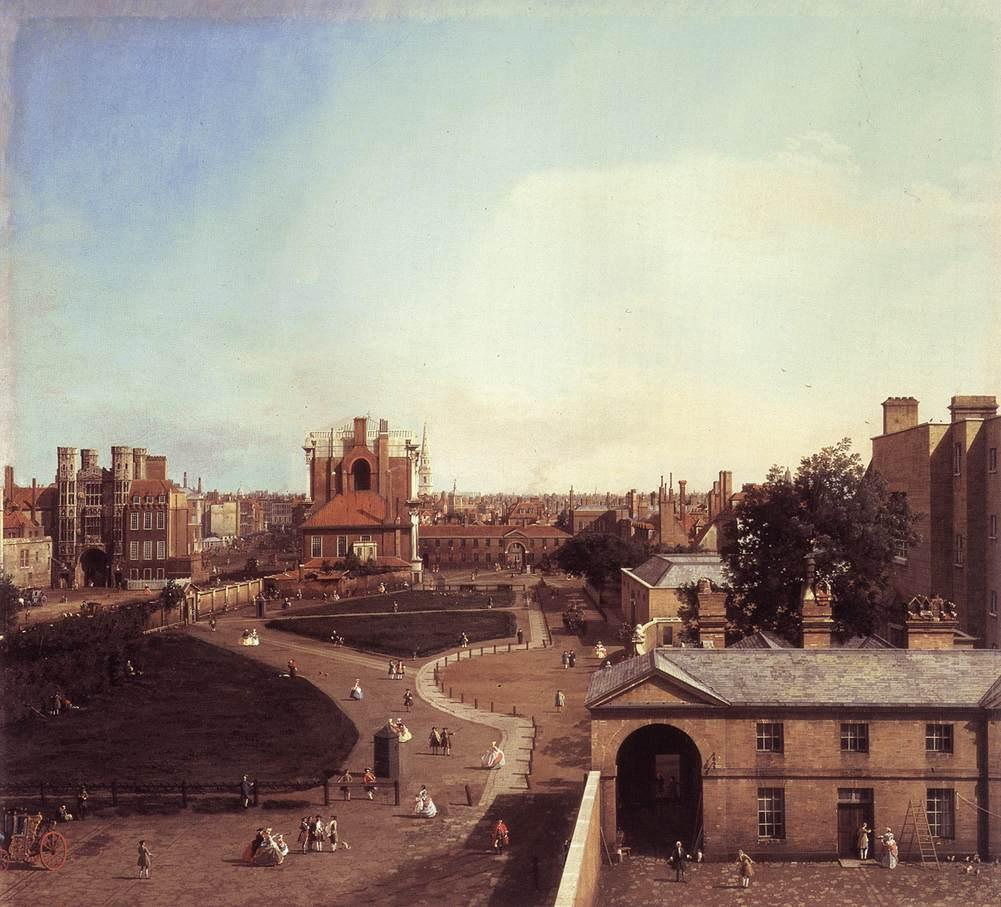
Canaletto's Whitehall and the Privy Garden from Richmond House, 1747. View looking north towards the Banqueting House

When Canaletto painted a view of the garden looking north from the Duke of Richmond's dining room in Richmond House in 1747, it was a last view of a prospect that was soon to disappear with the demolition of the old palace's Holbein Gate adjoining the garden. Parliament Street was driven through the western side of the garden in 1750 to connect Whitehall to the Palace of Westminster. At the start of the 19th century the garden's "decayed wall, long fringed by pamphlets, ballads, and ragged advertisements" was removed and replaced by an iron railing and newly planted trees. Its north side remained "most confused and unpleasant", terminating in a maze of "fifty narrow passages, formed by sheds, blank walls, the residences of the nobility, and the workshops of the tradesmen."

A house in Privy Gardens was occupied by Margaret, Dowager Duchess of Portland. She died on 17 February 1785. Upon her death the contents of the Portland Museum were sold off starting on 24 April 1786 and continued over a 37 day period. This museum is not to be confused with the current Portland Museum, Dorset, this one was in Bulstrode Park and featured the art collection of the Duke and Duchess. The auction was conducted by Mr Skinner and Co, of Aldersgate Street. Lot number 4155 was the Portland Vase.

The area was ripe for redevelopment by the landholding elite, who wished to have suitably grand townhouses to occupy while attending Parliament and the court. The vestiges of the Privy Garden became the site of a new street. In 1808 a row of houses called Whitehall Gardens was constructed on the site. Behind each house, long grassy gardens planted with rows of trees led directly down to the river, until they were cut off by the construction of the Victoria Embankment along the river bank between 1865 and 1870.

Prime Minister Benjamin Disraeli lived in one of the houses between 1873 and 1875, while Sir Robert Peel lived in another (and died there in 1850 after falling from his horse on Constitution Hill). The trees outside the front entrance to Whitehall Gardens were the last survivors of the original Privy Garden, and stood until as recently as the late 1930s.

Among the houses in Whitehall Gardens were Montagu House and Pembroke House, a Palladian riverside villa with elaborate interiors. The houses were demolished along with the rest of Whitehall Gardens in 1938, in what the architectural historian John Harris described as "a monstrous act of vandalism", to make way for the construction of the new offices of the Board of Trade and Air Ministry. The interior decorations of four of Pembroke House's rooms were saved after its demolition and were reinstalled in the new government offices, now the Ministry of Defence Main Building.
