= Maison de l'Agneau Blanc =

Coordinates: 50°50′52″N 4°21′10″E

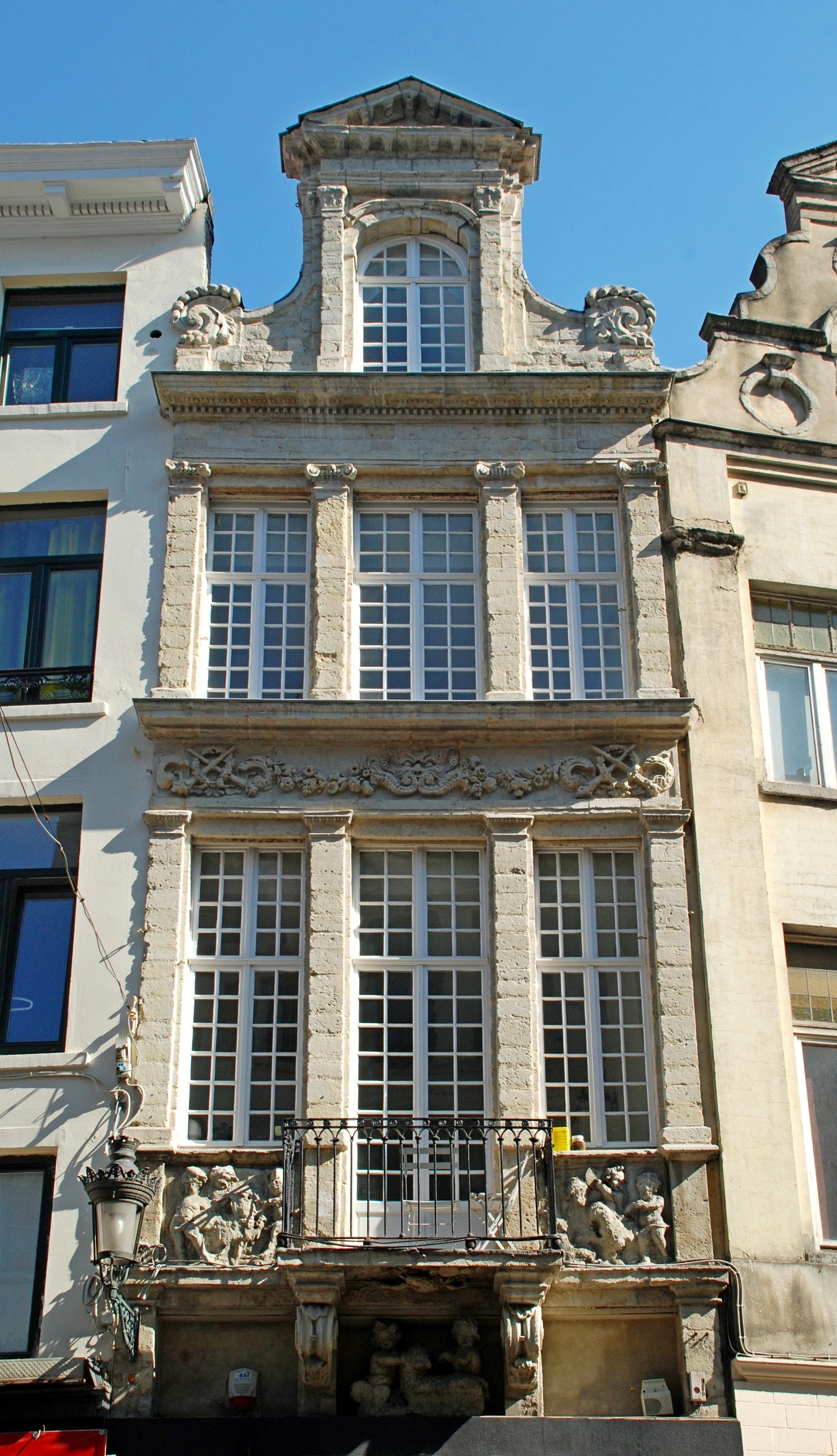
The front of the house.

The Maison de l'Agneau Blanc (French pronunciation: [mɛzɔ̃ də laɲo blɑ̃], lit. 'House of the White Lamb') or simply l'Agneau Blanc is a Baroque house in central Brussels, Belgium. Built in 1696, it is located at 42, rue du Marché aux Herbes/Grasmarkt (lit. 'Herb Market Street'), parallel to the Grand-Place/Grote Markt (main square). It has been a protected heritage site since 2011.

The sculptures on the façade are the work of Peter Van Dievoet, commissioned by Jean De Broe.

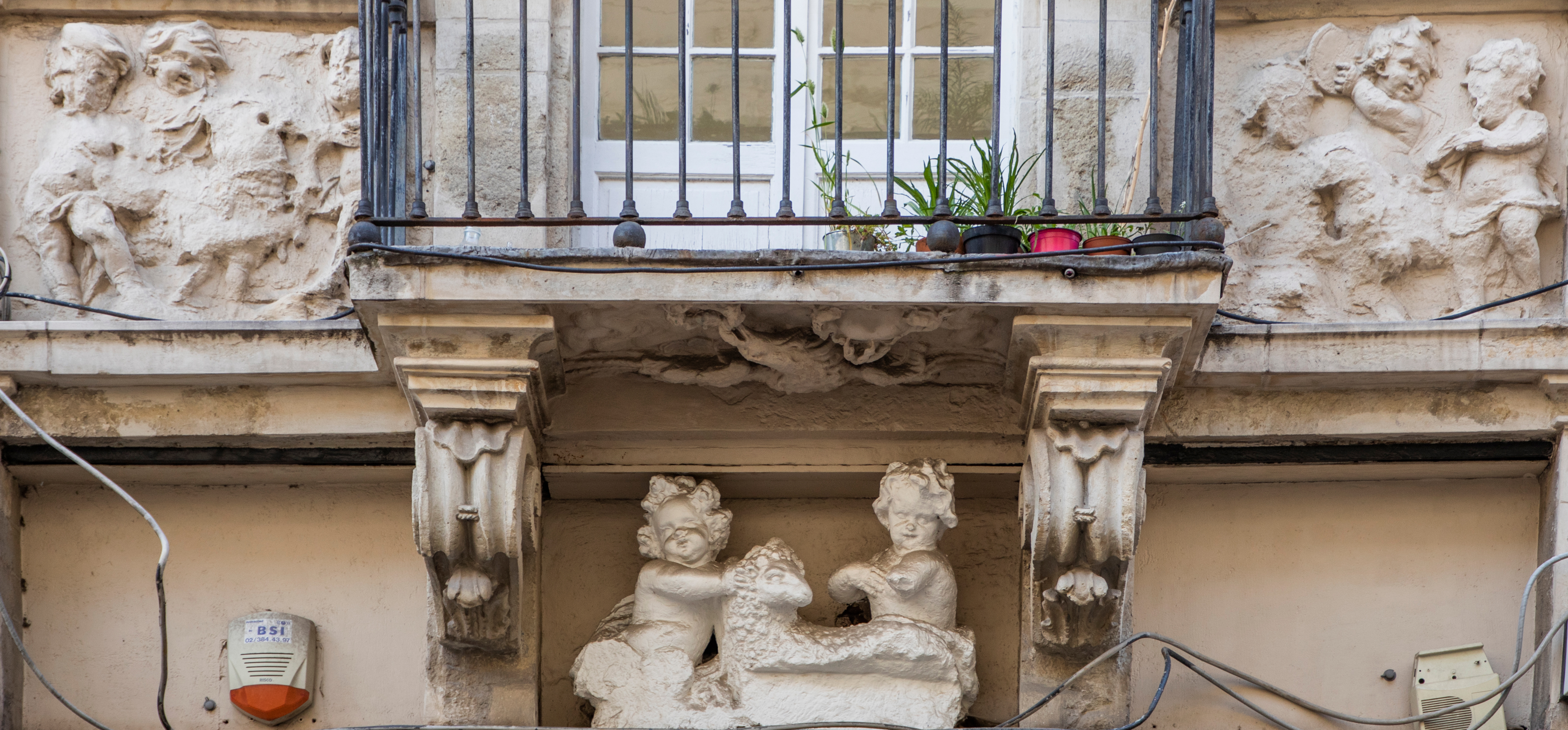
The four main sculptures by Peter Van Dievoet

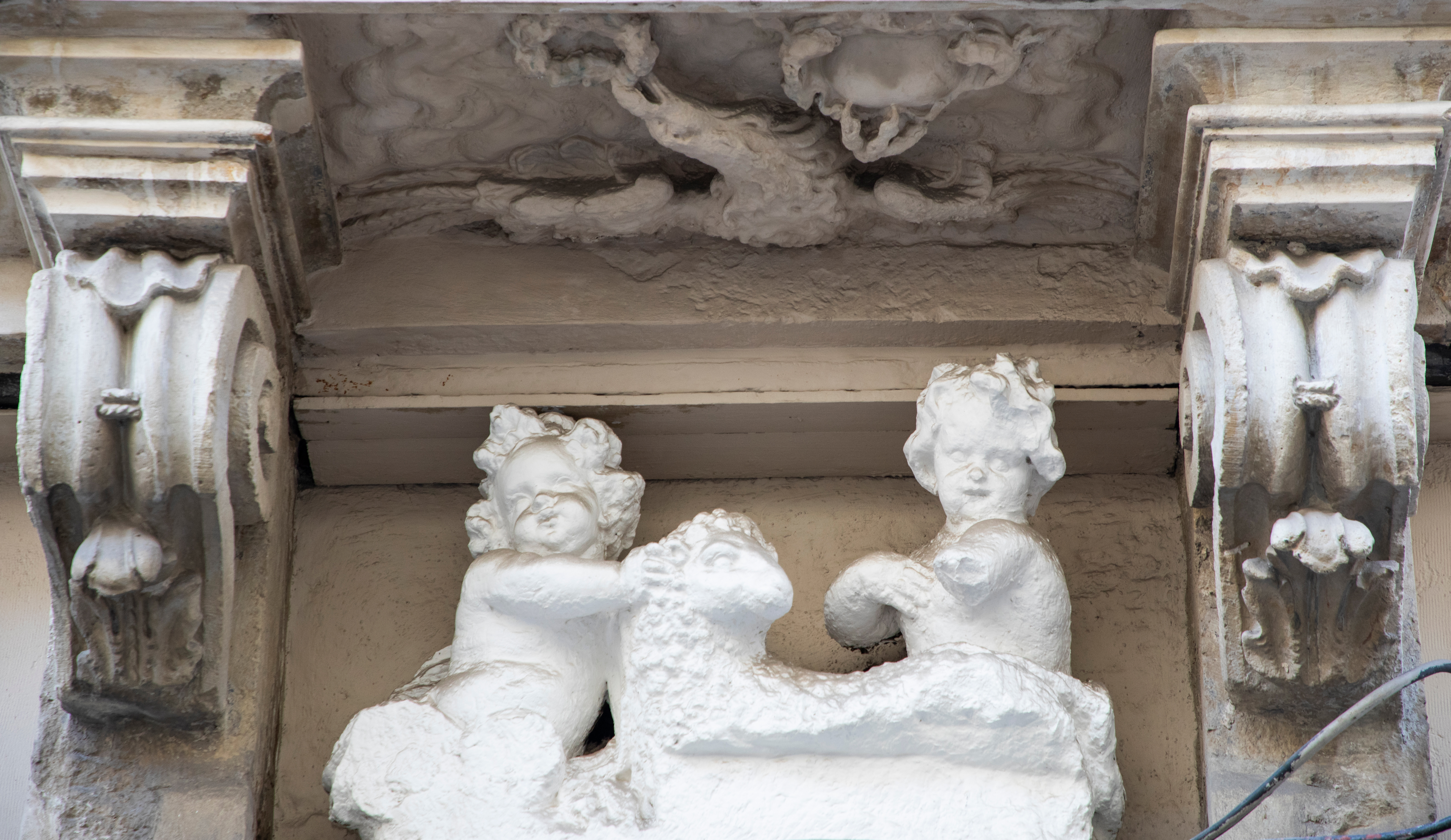
The White Lamb; the sculpture that gave the house its name

== See also ==
- 1696 in art
- Grand-Place
- Statue of James II, Trafalgar Square
