= Statue of James II, Trafalgar Square =

Public sculpture in London, England

Statue of James II
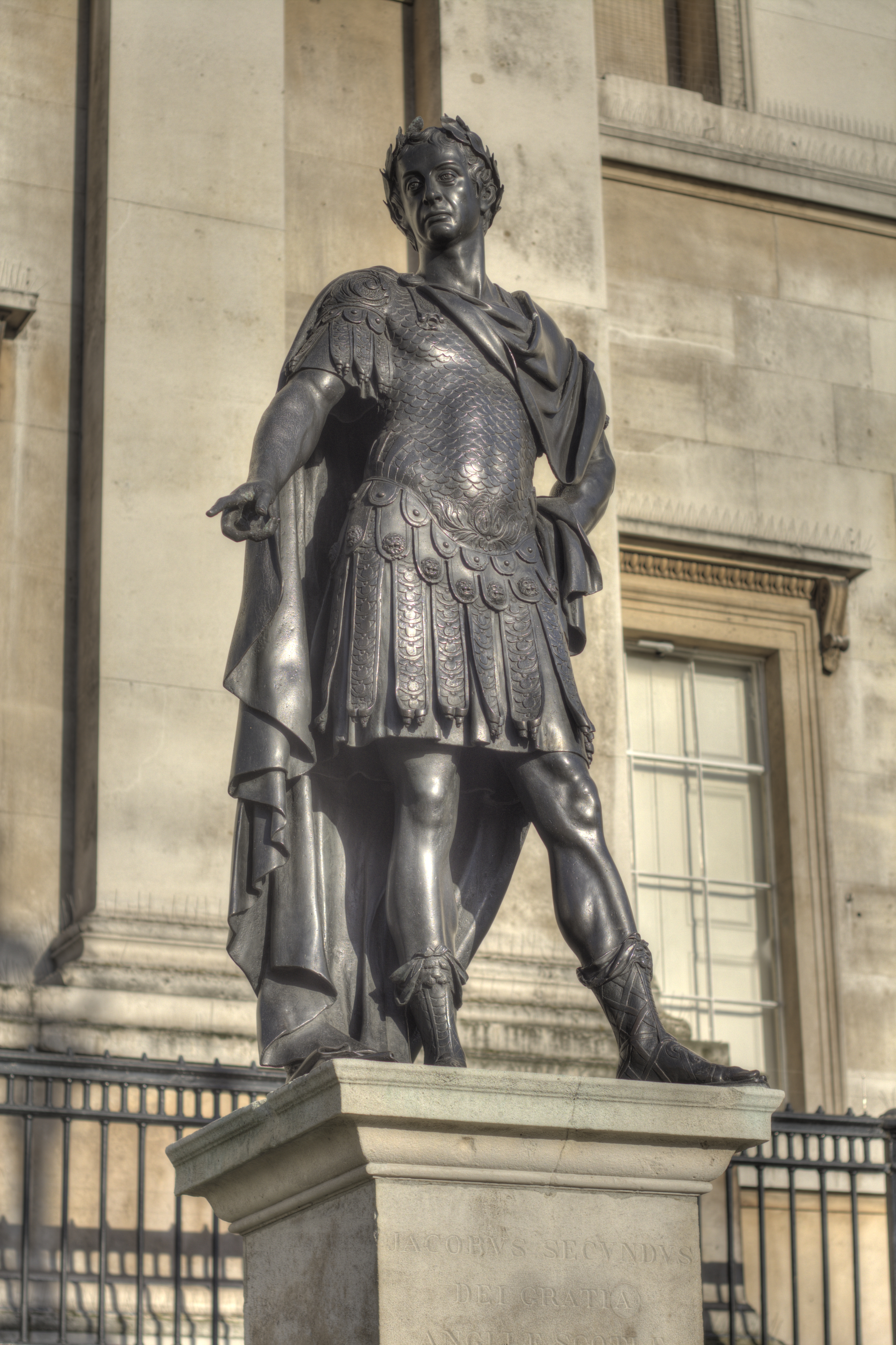
- The statue in 2015
- Artist: Peter van Dievoet and Laurens van der Meulen at the workshop of Grinling Gibbons
- Year: 1686; 340 years ago
- Type: Statue
- Medium: Bronze
- Movement: Classicism
- Subject: King James II
- Location: London, WC2 United Kingdom; 51.5084°N 0.1290°W

Listed Building – Grade I
- Official name: Statue of James II in front of National Gallery west wing
- Designated: 5 February 1970
- Reference no.: 1217629

The statue of James II is a bronze sculpture located in the front garden of the National Gallery in Trafalgar Square, London, United Kingdom. Probably inspired by French statues of the same period, it depicts James II of England as a Roman emperor, wearing Roman armour and a laurel wreath (traditionally awarded to a victorious Roman commander). It originally also depicted him holding a baton. It was produced by the workshop of Grinling Gibbons. The execution was most likely, according to contemporary accounts, the work of the Flemish sculptors Peter van Dievoet from Brussels and Laurens van der Meulen from Mechlin, rather than of Gibbons himself. The statue has been relocated several times since it was first erected in the grounds of the old Palace of Whitehall in 1686, only two years before James II was deposed.

== Description ==
The statue is executed in bronze and depicts James II as a Roman emperor. He is shown standing in a contrapposto pose and pointing downwards in "great ease of attitude and a certain serenity of air", as Allan Cunningham described it. It formerly held a baton in its right hand, though this is now missing. The face is said to be an excellent depiction of the king. Unusually for the time, the sculptor sought a degree of fidelity to original classical styles; James is depicted wearing a laurel wreath on top of short hair, whereas other imperial-style statues of both Charles II and James II depicted the two kings with an anachronistic combination of Roman armour and a 17th-century periwig.

The statue was probably inspired by similar imperial portrayals of Louis XIV of France. One in particular, a colossal statue by Martin Desjardins of the French king wearing Roman armour with a laurel wreath and baton, is so similar in type to the figures of Charles II and James II that it may have been their direct inspiration.

The plinth is inscribed with the legend JACOBUS SECUNDUS/ DEI GRATIA/ ANGLIÆ SCOTIÆ/ FRANCIÆ ET/ HIBERNIÆ/ REX/ FIDEI DEFENSOR/ ANNO M.D.C.LXXXVI, which translates to: "James II, by the grace of God, King of England, Scotland, France and Ireland. Defender of the Faith. 1686."

== History ==
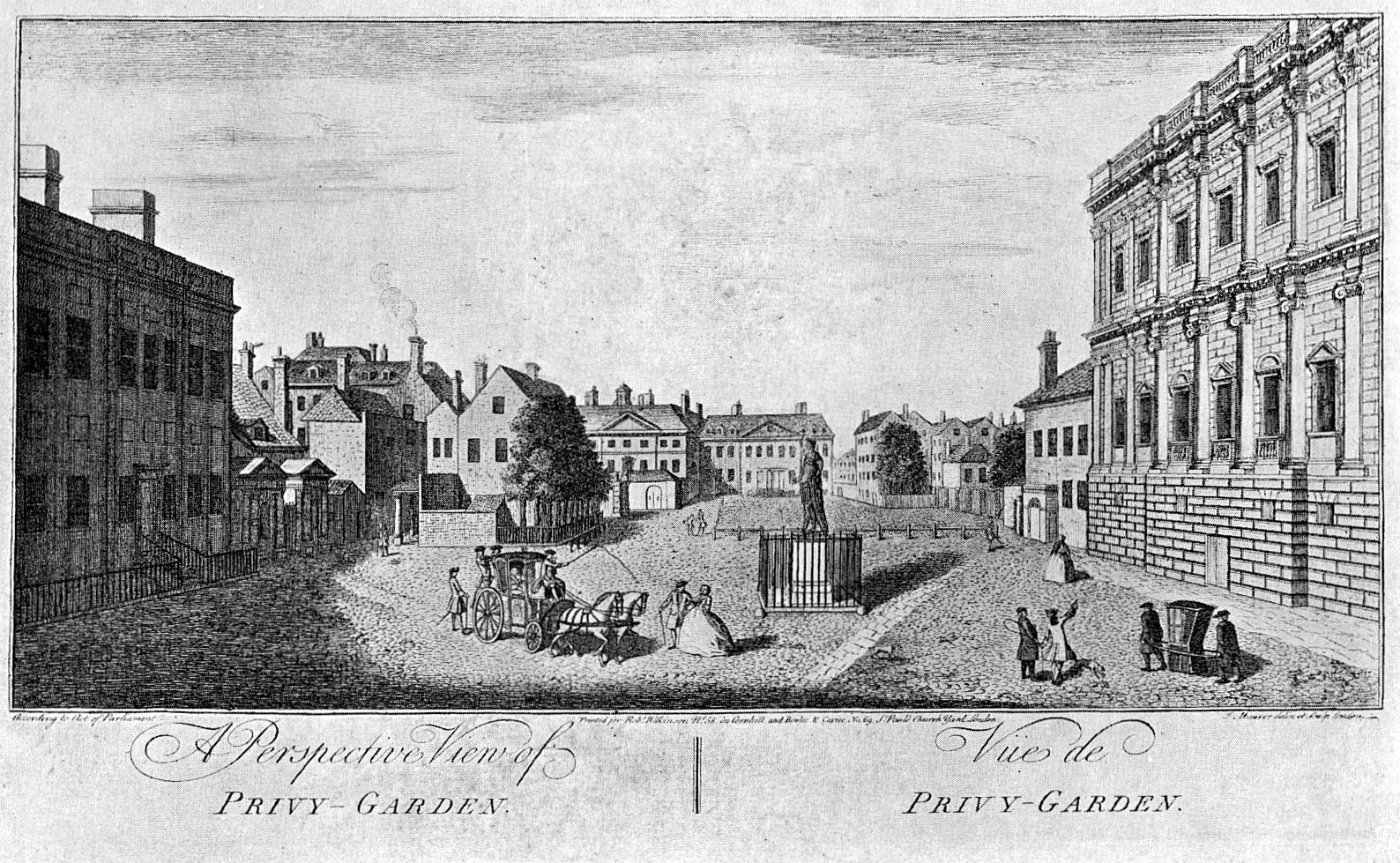
The Privy Gardens of Whitehall in 1741. The statue is visible on the right.

The statue of James II is one of three of the Stuart monarchs commissioned by the royal servant Tobias Rustat from Grinling Gibbons's workshop in the 1670s and '80s, the others being of James's brother and predecessor Charles II: an equestrian statue in Windsor Castle and a standing figure at the Royal Hospital in Chelsea. The statue of James II was commissioned for the Palace of Whitehall, apparently at the same time as the standing Charles II, and the two works might have been intended as pendant pieces. It was produced in the workshop of Grinling Gibbons at a reported cost of £300 (equivalent to about £42,000 at 2014 prices). While the work was long attributed to Gibbons himself, large-scale sculptures were not his forte. Contemporary accounts attribute it to sculptors Peter van Dievoet of Brussels who came to London to cast this statue, and Laurens van der Meulen of Mechelen.

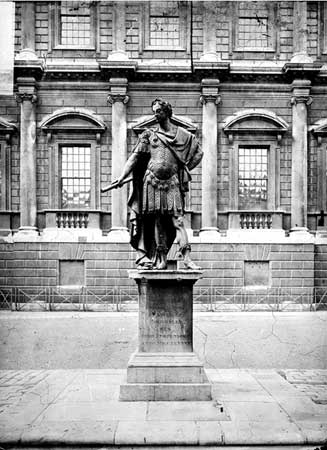
The statue outside the Banqueting House, Whitehall in 1897, still with the now missing baton in the right hand

The James II was erected at the Palace of Whitehall on 24 March 1686, as recorded by a contemporary, Sir John Bramston the Younger. George Vertue, who found an agreement and a receipt of payment for the work, wrote that it was "modelled & made by Lawrence Vandermeulen (of Brussels) [sic] ... & Devoot [i.e. Peter Van Dievoet] (of Mechlin) [sic] who was imployed [sic] by ... Gibbons", and that Thomas Benniere was involved in the casting. A series of five drawings in the British Museum, which might be for either the standing Charles II or the James II, is attributed variously to Gibbons or to Van Dievoet. Its artistic qualities were praised by J. P. Malcolm in his 1803 history, London Redivivum, in which he wrote:

There is but one fault in the figure, and that is the attitude. The King seems to point with a baton at the earth, to which his eyes are directed; but why? Surely this is an egregious error. However, perhaps the artist may have been commanded to model the statue thus; and if not, his mistake is more than counter-balanced by the beautiful turns of the muscles, the excellence of the features, and the true folds of the drapery.

James II's statue has stood in several locations since it was first erected. It originally stood in the Palace of Whitehall's Pebble Court, where it was installed on New Year's Day, 1686. It was situated behind the Banqueting House and faced the river, a position which attracted much satirical comment after James' flight from London during the Glorious Revolution of 1688; it was said that the statue's location indicated his method of escape.

It was taken down after the Glorious Revolution but was replaced by order of William III. In 1898 it was moved to a location in the garden of Gwydyr House. It was taken down four years later to make room for the stands for the coronation of Edward VII. It lay on its back amid grass and weeds in a state of total neglect until it was re-erected in 1903 outside the New Admiralty building. It was displaced again when the Admiralty Citadel was built in 1940. During the Second World War it was put into storage at Aldwych tube station. It was relocated to its present site in 1947. The statue is listed by Historic England as a Grade I listed building, a status which it was granted in 1970.

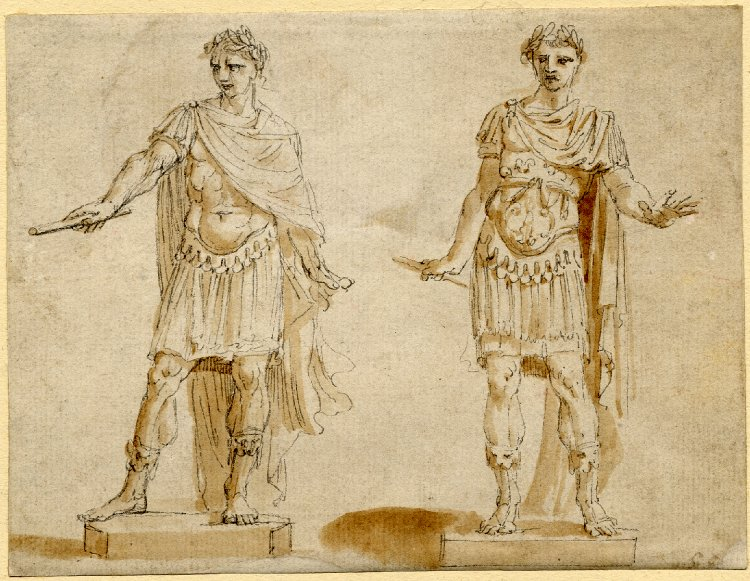
Study for a statue attributed to Peter van Dievoet

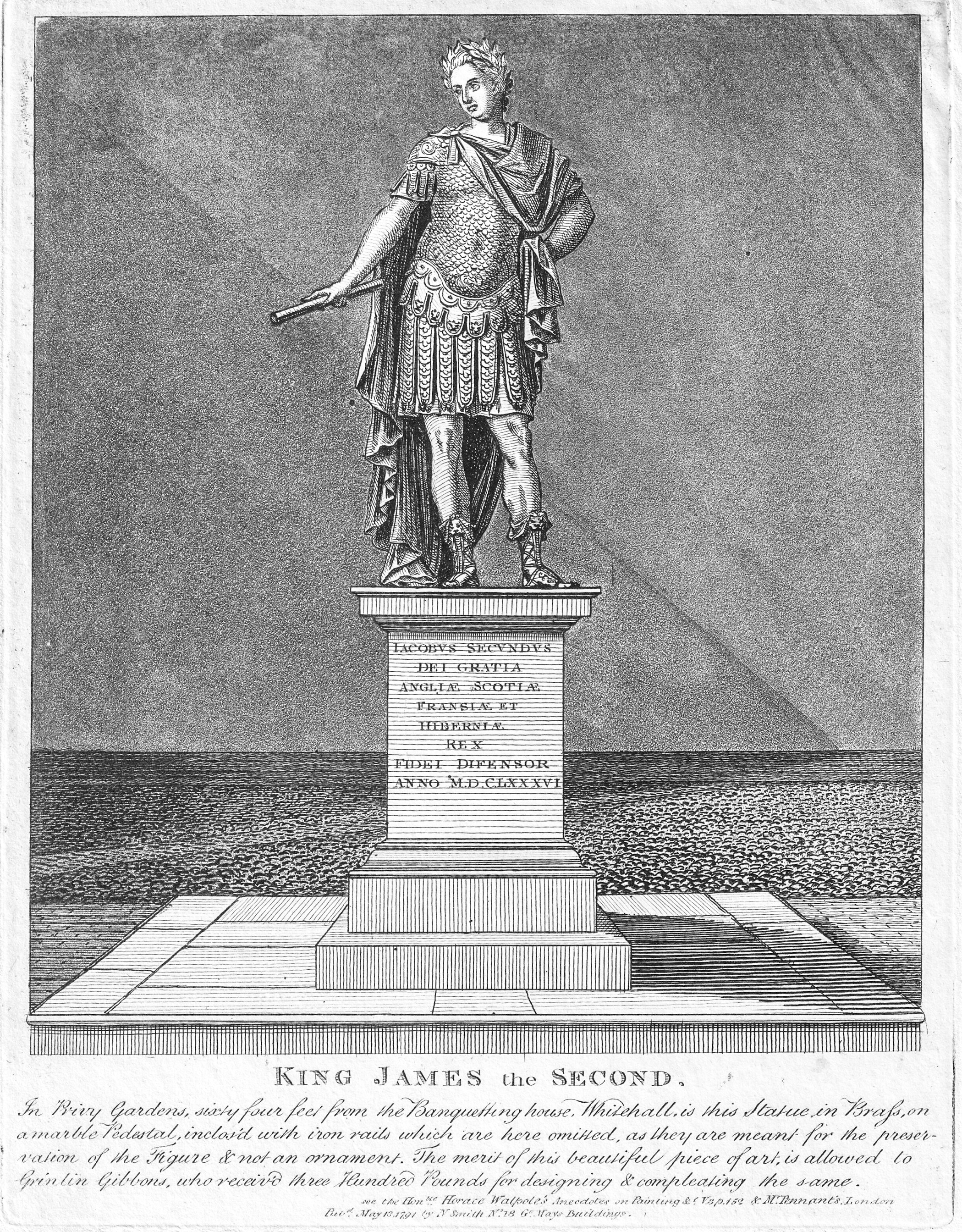
The statue on the grounds of the Privy Garden of the Palace of Whitehall. Engraving by N. Smith (1791)

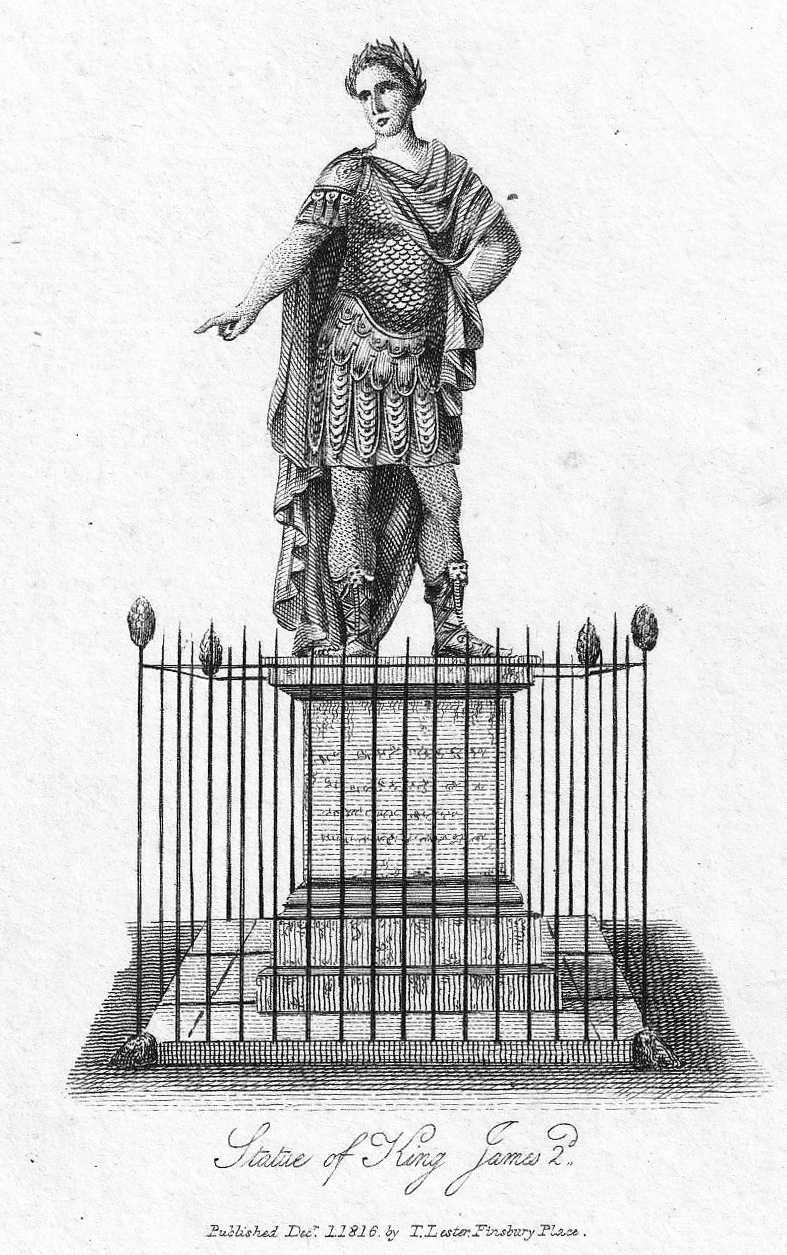
Engraving of the statue of King James II by T. Lester (1816), without a baton

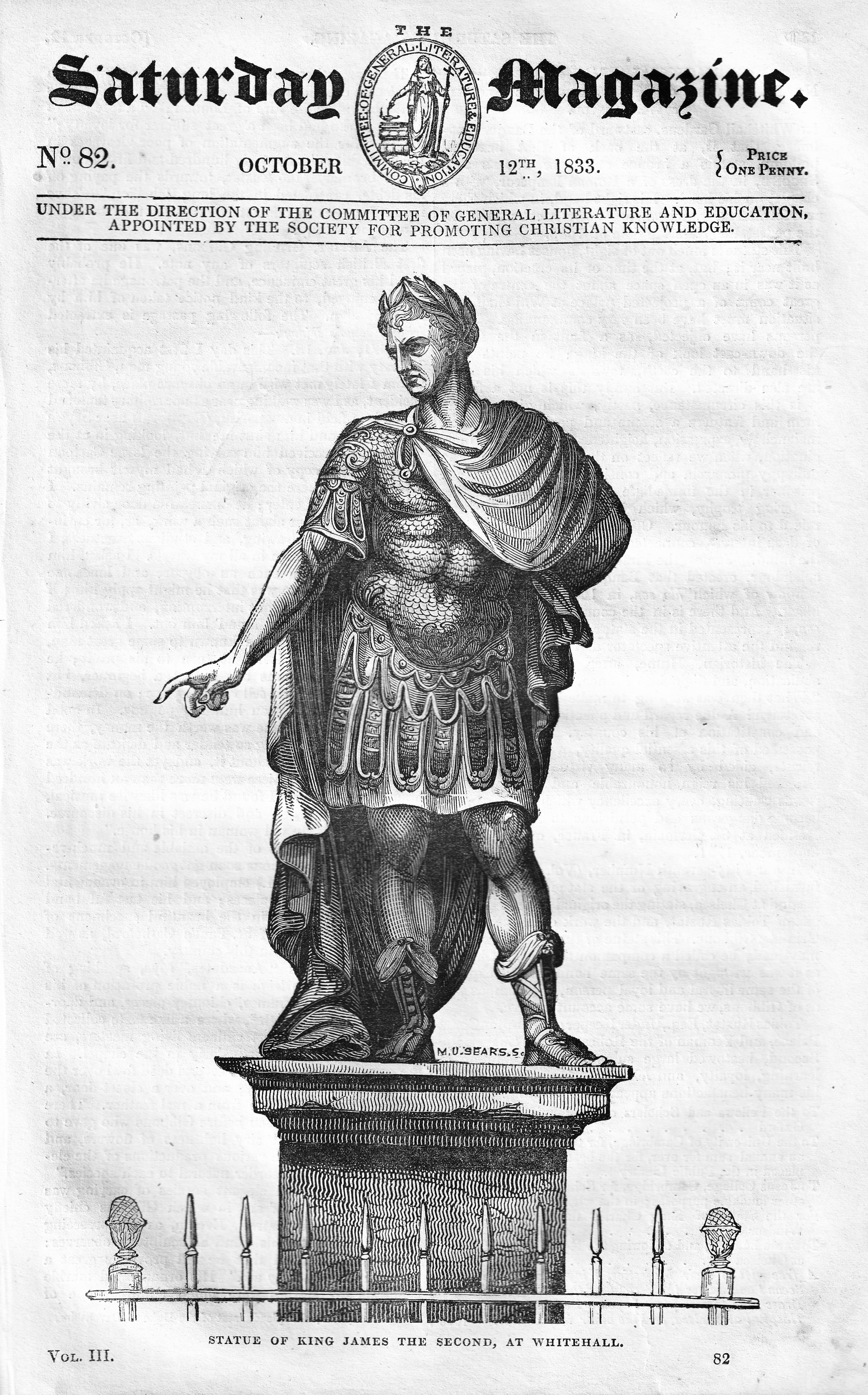
Engraving of the statue on the cover page of The Saturday Magazine, 1833

== Bibliography ==
- George Vertue and Horace Walpole, Anecdotes of painting in England, London, 1765, vol. III, p. 91.
- George Vertue, Note Books, ed. Walpole Society, Oxford, 1930–1947, vol. I, pp. 61, 82, 106; vol. IV, p. 50.
- Antoine-Nicolas Dézallier d'Argenville, de l'Académie Royale des Belles-Lettres de la Rochelle, Vie des fameux sculpteurs depuis la renaissance des arts, avec la description de leurs ouvrages, Paris, chez Debure l'aîné, 1787, tome II, pp. 101–102.
- Katherine Gibson, "The emergence of Grinling Gibbons as a statuary", published in Apollo, September 1999.
- Alain Van Dievoet, "Un disciple belge de Grinling Gibbons, le sculpteur Pierre van Dievoet (1661–1729) et son œuvre à Londres et Bruxelles", in: Le Folklore brabançon, March 1980, vol. 225, pp. 65–91 (with description and history).
- John Ingamells, Later Stuart Portraits 1685-1714. London: National Portrait Gallery, 2009, p. 130.
