= Roland Paradis =

Roland Paradis (c. 1696 – April 28, 1754) was an important silversmith in New France (now part of Canada).

Paradis was born in Paris to Claude Paradis and Geneviève Cussy. His father was a silversmith, and likely taught his son the trade. Paradis moved to New France sometime before 1728. On February 3 of that year, he married Marie-Angélique Boivin in the church of Notre-Dame de Québec.

He worked as a silversmith for some time in Quebec City, but by June 1736 he is recorded as living and working in Ville-Marie, the older name for Montreal. Paradis continued to work in Montreal until at least 1749.

Paradis produced many silver pieces of religious significance. In 1739, he produced a "ciborium for the Eucharist" for the parish of Saint-Charles-de-Lachenaie. He crafted pieces for the church of Sainte-Anne-de-Varennes in 1742 and for the church of Saint-François-de-Sales in 1745 (in the modern-day Saint-François district of the city of Laval, not to be confused with the Saint-François-de-Sales, Quebec in Saguenay–Lac-Saint-Jean). Paradis stamped his work with the letters "RP" beneath a crown. On April 28, 1754, Paradis died in Montreal.

Examples of Paradis's works are still held by a number of religious institutions as well as by museums and collectors. The Musée du Québec holds a number of his pieces, as does the Royal Ontario Museum.
