= Peter Van Dievoet =

Flemish sculptor active in Brussels and London

Peter van Dievoet
- Born: Brussels
- Baptised: 29 June 1661
- Died: 2 March 1729 (68 years old); Brussels
- Known for: Sculpture, architecture
- Notable work: Statue of James II, Trafalgar Square and facades of buildings on the Grand-Place,
- Style: Baroque, classical
- Spouse: Dorothea de Witte
- Elected: Guilds of Brussels, Drapery Court, Magistracy of Brussels.

Peter van Dievoet (/ˈdiːvʊt/; Dutch: Peeter van Dievoet, French: Pierre van Dievoet, Latin: Petrus; 1661–1729) was a Flemish Baroque sculptor, statuary, wood carver and designer of ornamental architectural elements active in Brussels and England. He is known for his work on a number of the Baroque guild houses on the Grand-Place (Brussels's main square), which was rebuilt after the bombardment of 1695, as well as on the Statue of James II on Trafalgar Square, London, made in collaboration with fellow Flemish sculptor Laurens van der Meulen. He was the half-brother of Philippe van Dievoet, goldsmith to King Louis XIV of France and the uncle of the Parisian printer Guillaume Vandive.

== Life ==
=== Early years ===
Peter van Dievoet was born in Brussels as the son of Gillis van Dievoet (? - † before 1672), a burgher of Brussels, and Gertrudis Zeevaert. He was baptised at the Church of St. Michael and St. Gudula (now Brussels' cathedral) on 29 June 1661. His father was previously married to Catarina Slachmeulder (or Catharina Slachmoelders), whose son Philippe van Dievoet later became a goldsmith to King Louis XIV of France. The young Peter became fatherless around the age of twelve or thirteen. His mother later remarried and died on 22 July 1705.

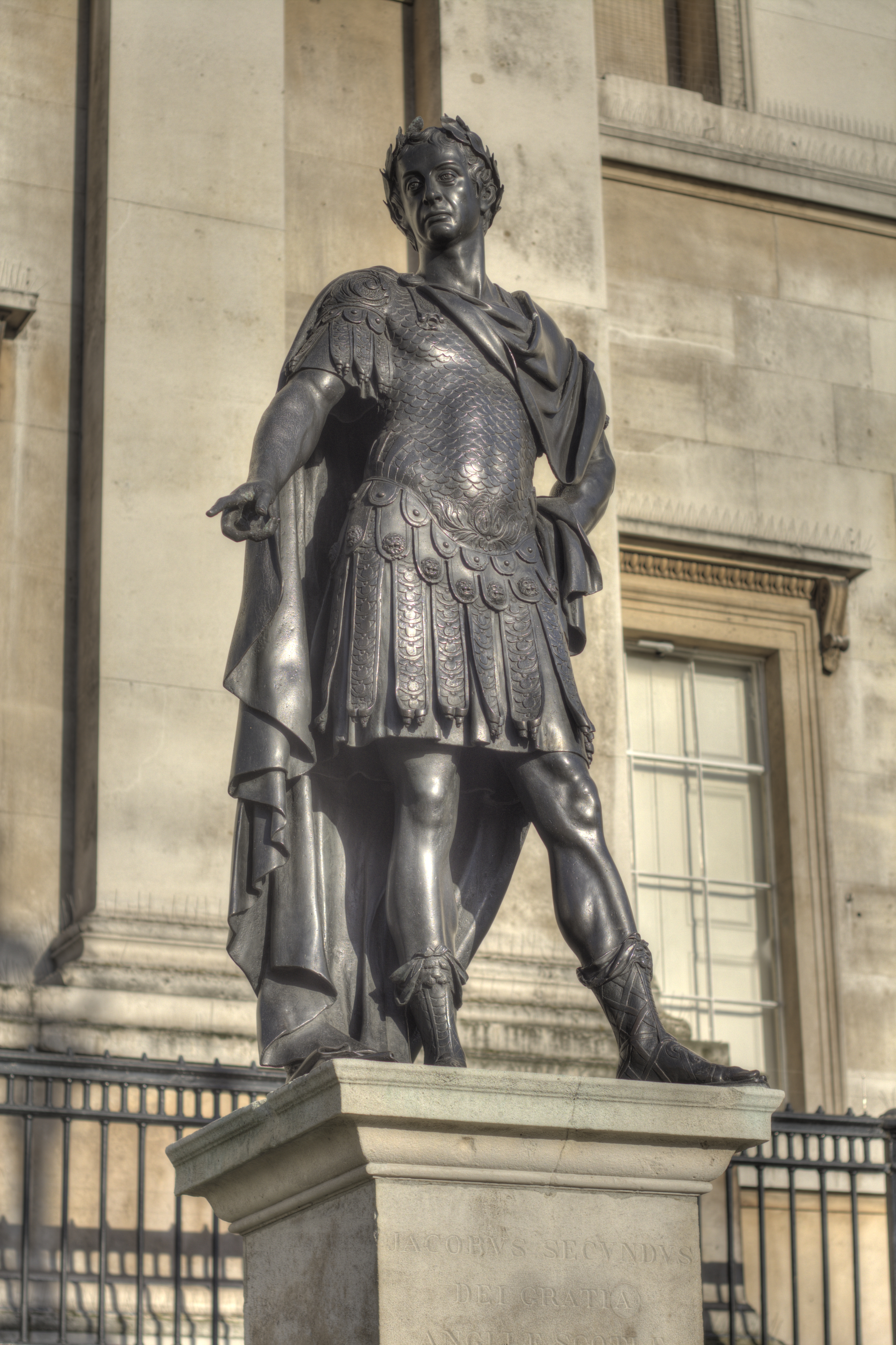
Statue of King James II by van Dievoet and Laurens van der Meulen, Trafalgar Square, London, 1686

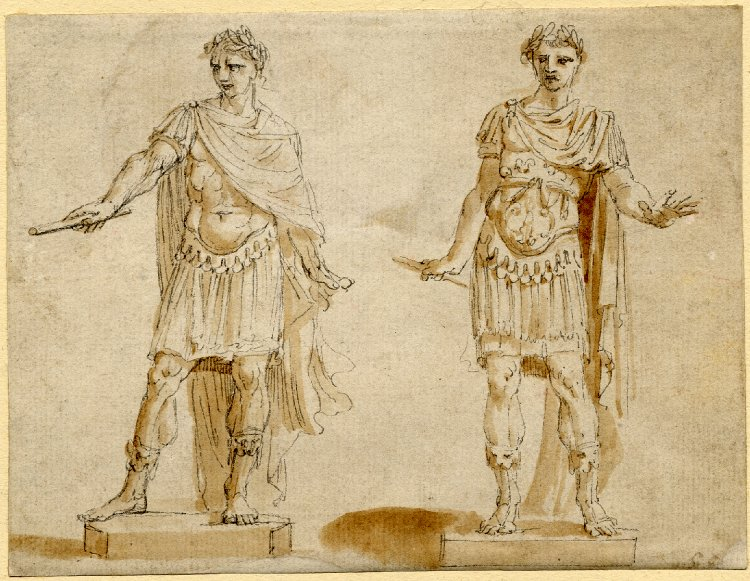
Studies for a statue of either James II or Charles II. Pen and brown wash, attributed to van Dievoet, in the collection of the British Museum.

=== Residence in London (1680–1688) ===
He moved at some unknown date to England where he was a collaborator in the studio of (Rotterdam-born) English sculptor Grinling Gibbons from 1680 to 1688. Gibbons was mainly known as a sculptor for his fine carvings of floral motifs. Other experienced Flemish sculptors such as Artus Quellinus III (the son of Artus Quellinus II), John Nost, Anthony Verhuke and Laurens van der Meulen also worked in Gibbon's London workshop as "servants", i.e. collaborators. As these Flemish artists were not trainees they were never entered in the Draper's records.

Van Dievoet's English production (mainly sculptures) remains relatively unknown. In the Gibbons workshop he worked on various commissions but the contributions of the various artists active in the workshop are not always identifiable. George Vertue mentions van Dievoet only as statuary.

George Vertue found an agreement and a payment receipt for the bronze statue of James II (1686) made for the courtyard of Whitehall and currently placed on Trafalgar Square. Vertue attributed this work to a collaboration between van Dievoet and a certain Laurens of Mechelen. Margaret Whinney notes that this statue does not have an English but rather a continental character and gives it the same attribution: "two Flemings, Laurens of Mechelen and Dievot of Brussels (sic), were employed to model and make it." This attribution is repeated by Sir Lionel Henri Cust: "Dyvoet (sic) ... and Laurens ... who executed the statue of James II at Whitehall." The aforementioned Laurens was identified by Paul-Eugène Claessens as the Flemish sculptor Laurens van der Meulen from Mechelen.

Some studies for statues of probably Charles II or James II held in the British Museum are attributed to van Dievoet.

A bronze statuette of James II in the collection of the V&A, previously attributed only to Artus Quellinus III, has had its attribution changed in 2023 to possibly being by the hand of van Dievoet.

=== Return to Brussels (1689–1729) ===
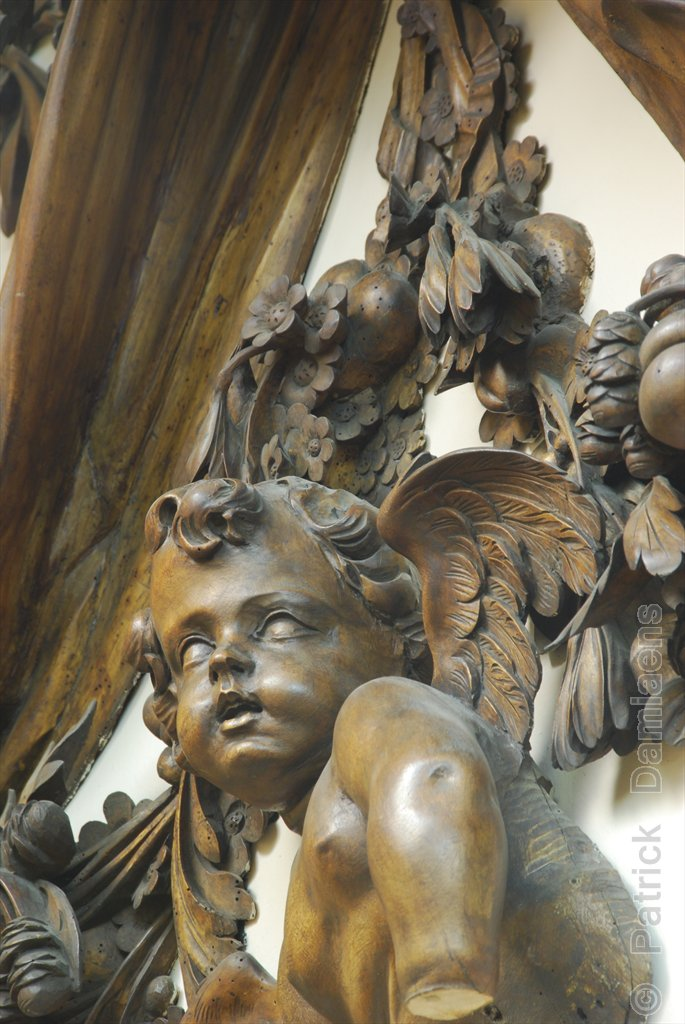
Detail of ornamentation of festoons and fruits attributed to van Dievoet (Royal Museums of Art and History).

He returned to Brussels as a result of the events arising from the Glorious Revolution of 1688, which had led to the deposition of the English King. In 1695, he became master of the Quatre-Couronnés at Brussels, the guild of stonemasons and sculptors. It is from this time that his work in Brussels begins. That same year, Brussels was largely destroyed by the French bombardment, which offered many opportunities for architects and sculptors in the rebuilding of the city. He was involved in the reconstruction of the Grand-Place in a Baroque style.

=== Public functions ===
Van Dievoet occupied various public offices. From 1713 to 1723, between ages 52 and 62, he was one of The Eight and then Dean (judge) of the Drapery Court, a Brussels institution comparable to a chamber of commerce, whose members were called the "brothers of the Guild". At the end of his term, he became a member of the magistrate as a Councilor of the City of Brussels from 1723 to 1724. After that, he left public life. A pious man, he had been, until the end of his life, a marguillier (churchwarden) of the Church of St. Michael and St. Gudula.

He died in Brussels on 2 March 1729, at the age of 68.

== Work ==
=== General ===
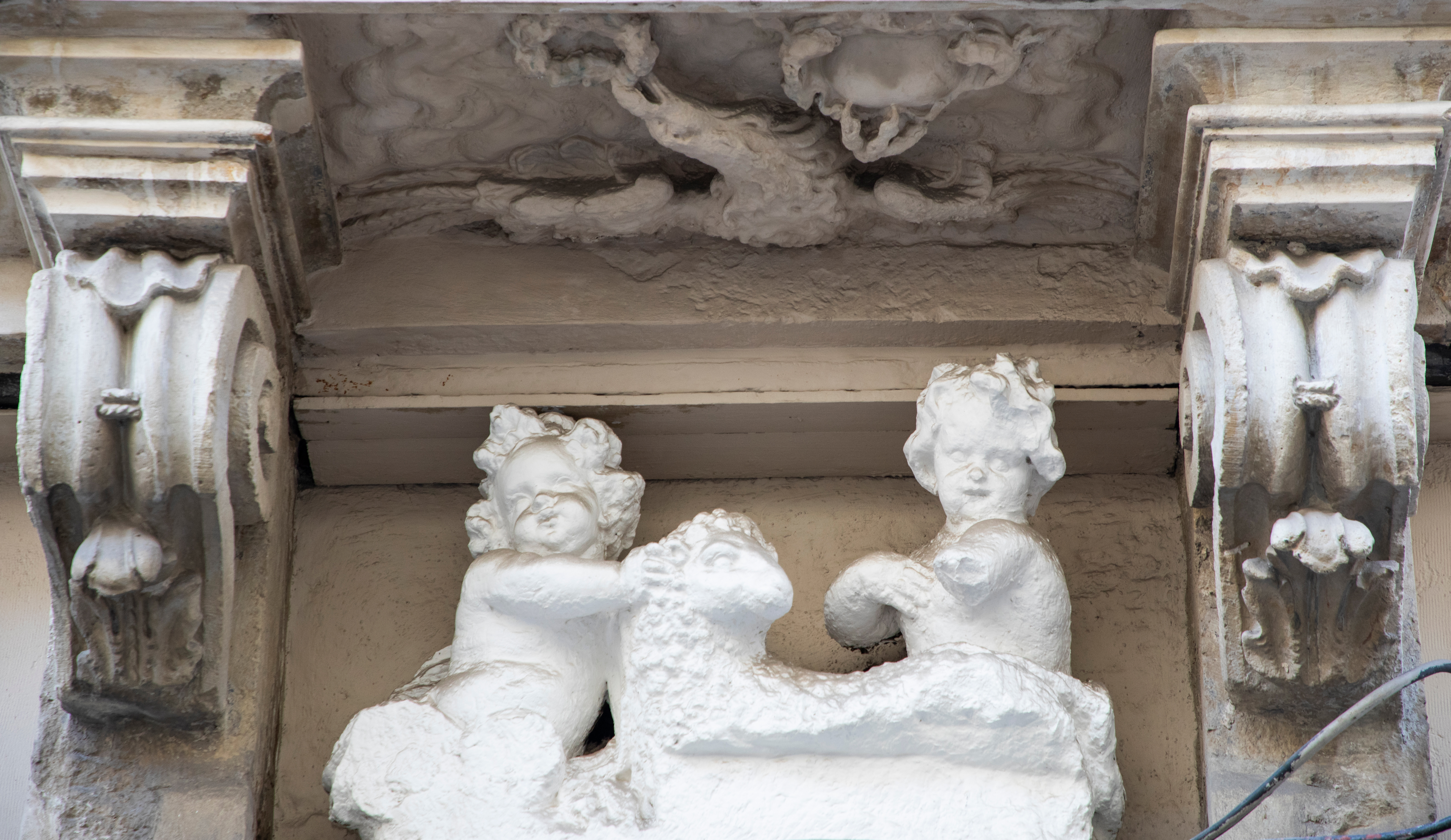
The White Lamb, by Peter van Dievoet, Rue du Marché aux Herbes/Grasmarkt, Brussels, 1696

Long after van Dievoet's death, a report of the magistrates of Brussels to Prince Charles Alexander of Lorraine, Governor of the Habsburg Netherlands, dated 27 September 1771, quotes van Dievoet in a list of "very remarkable Brussels sculptors". From his Brussels work, only the pieces mentioned by Guillaume Des Marez are known. He is mainly known there for his design and execution of many of the guild houses of Brussels' Grand-Place.

The following works are described by Des Marez:

==== The House of the White Lamb ====
The sculptures on the facade of the 1696 built House of the White Lamb (Maison de l'Agneau Blanc) on the Rue du Marché aux Herbes/Grasmarkt are the work of van Dievoet.

==== The Grand-Place ====
Van Dievoet sculpted the facades of the following guild halls on the Grand-Place: La Maison du Sac (Grand-Place, number 4), La Maison du Cornet (number 6), La Maison de l'Arbre d'Or or the House of Brewers (number 10), La Maison de la Chaloupe d'Or (number 24-25). He was also the architect for Le Heaume (number 34).

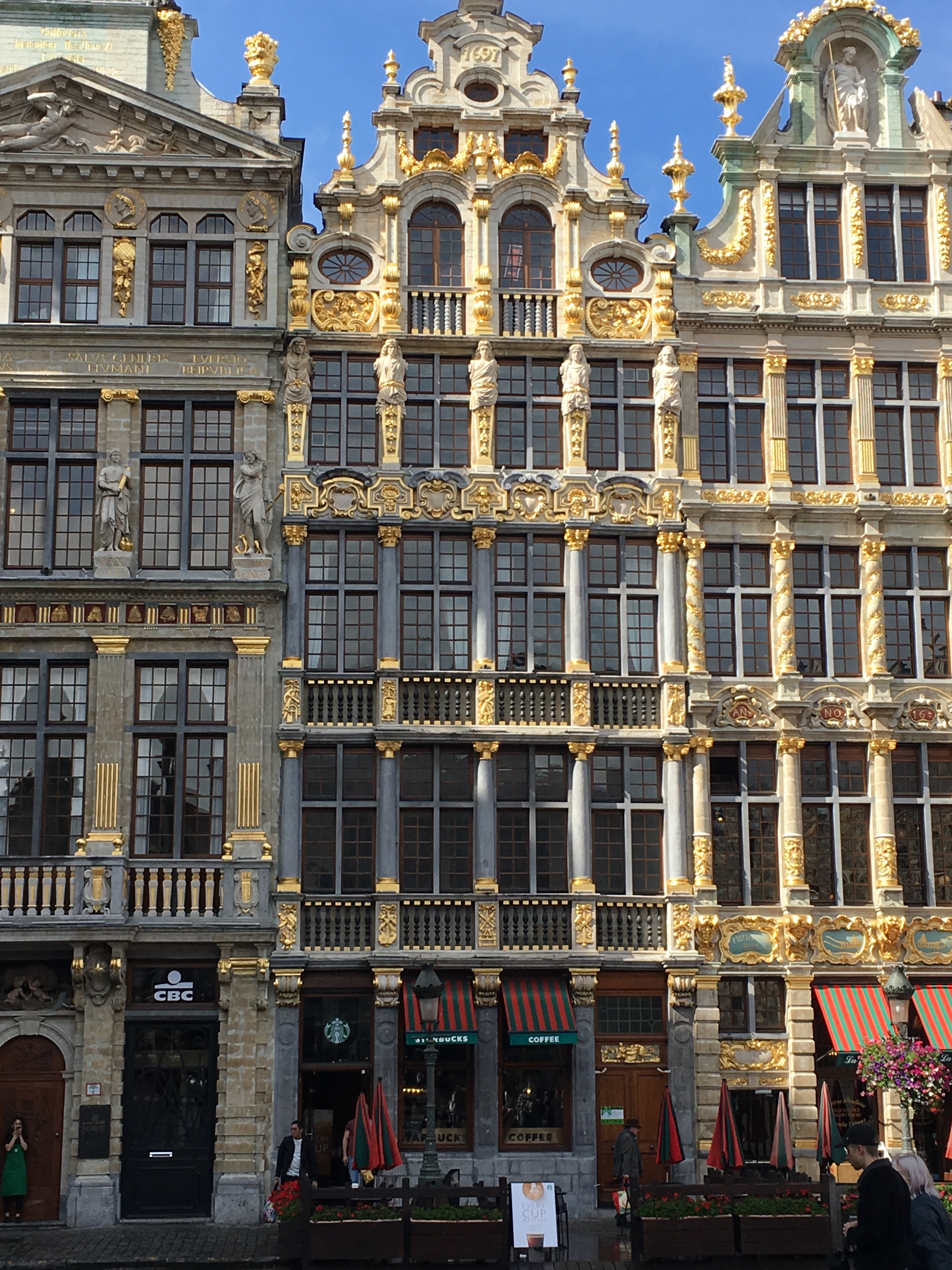
La Maison du Sac

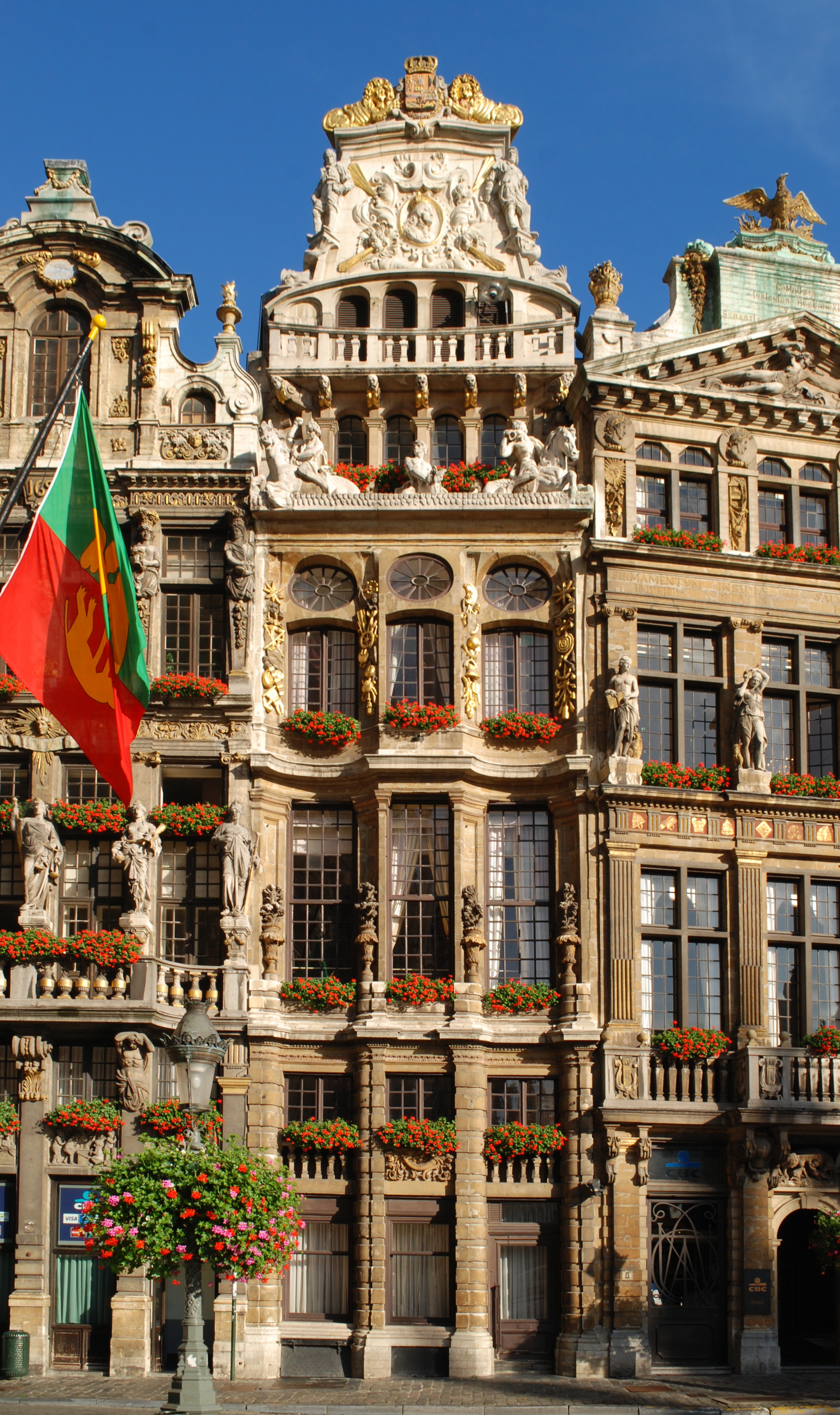
La Maison du Cornet

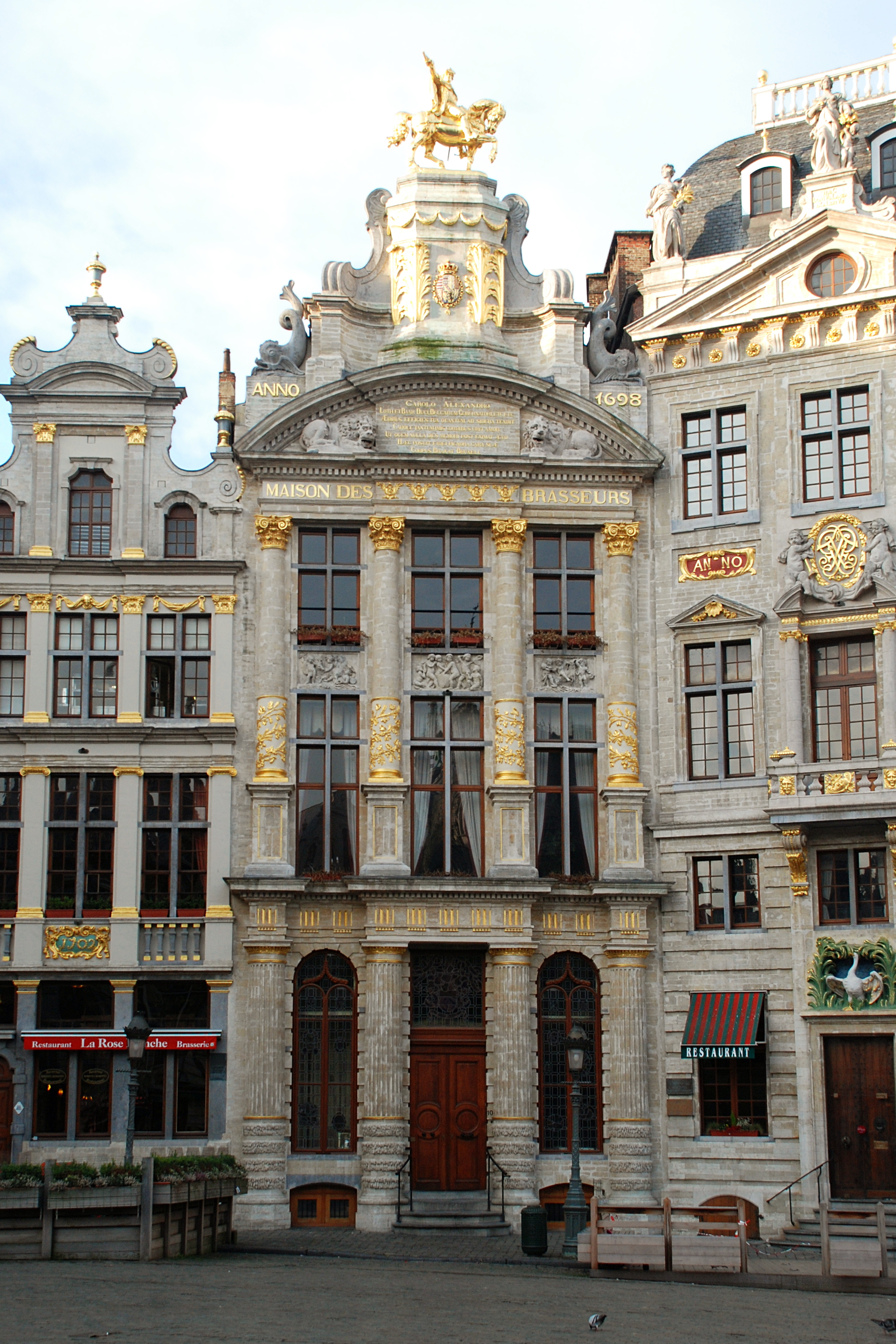
L'Arbre d'Or

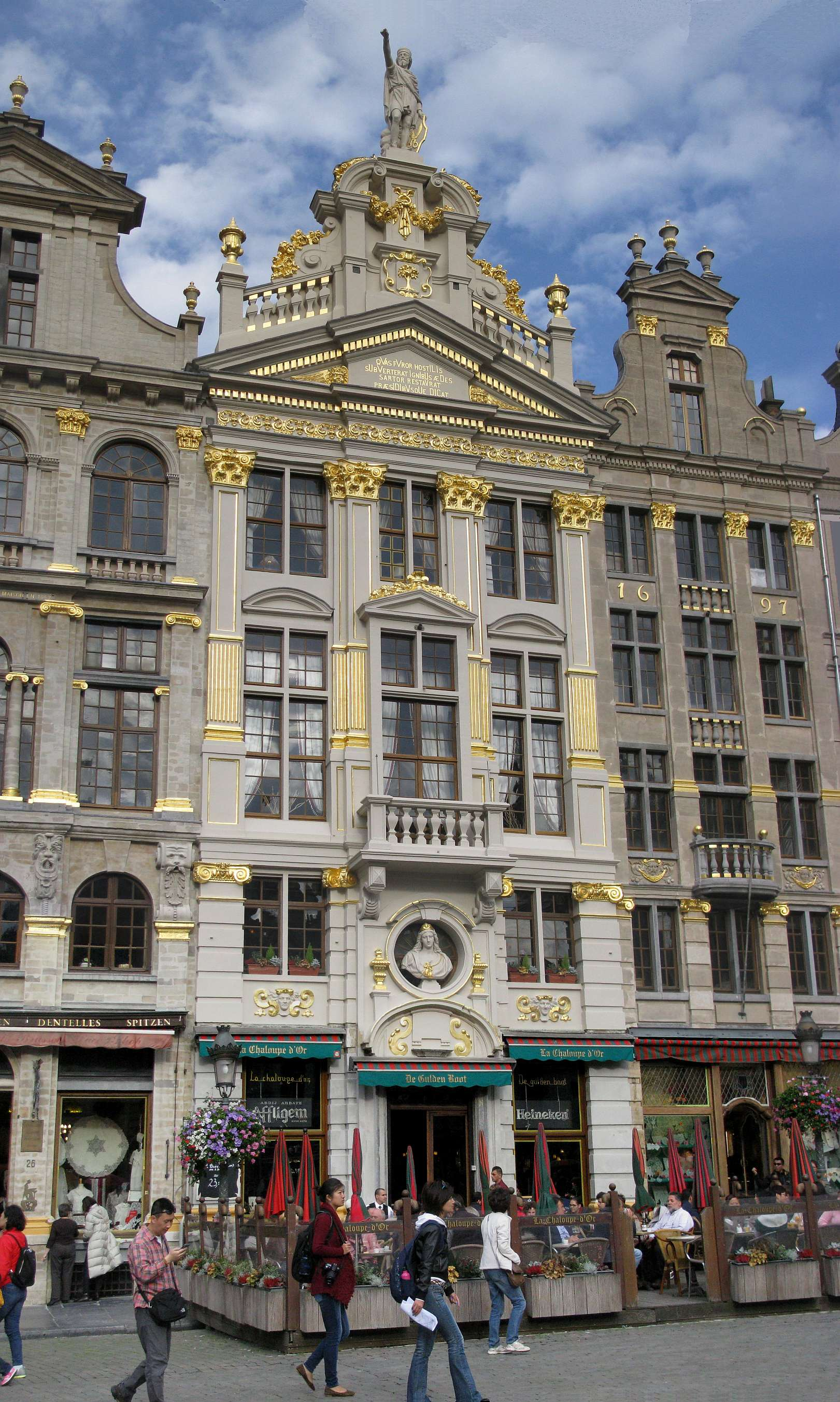
La Maison de la Chaloupe d'Or

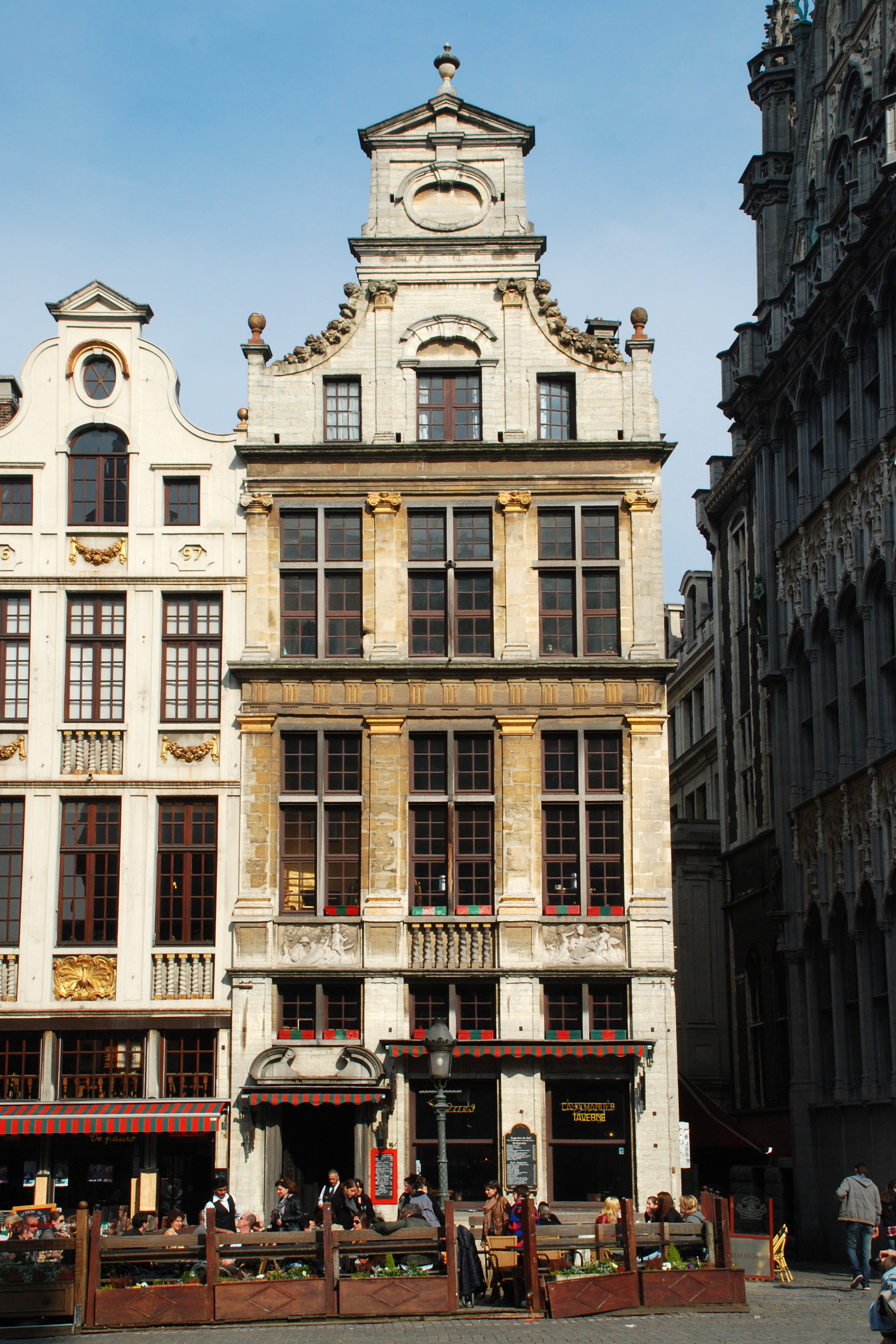
La Maison du Heaume

==== Wood carving ====
To van Dievoet are attributed some finely chiseled woodcarvings, such as the elaborate lime-wood ornamentation of festoons and fruits in the collection of the Royal Museums of Art and History of Brussels. He also carved wooden "keerses" - richly decorated emblems that were used for celebrations of the tailors' guild of Brussels.

== Arms ==
Coat of arms of Peter van Dievoet
| Notes These personal arms were recorded in 1713 in the roll of arms of the Drapery Court of Brussels and differ from those of his brother Jean-Baptiste and his branch of the family. Escutcheon Per pale Argent and Sable, on a tower embattled of three merlons counterchanged and gated of the field between in chief two mullets of six-points Gules and Or and in base a crescent counterchanged, an escutcheon per pale Or and Gules with a bordure counterchanged. |

Gallery:
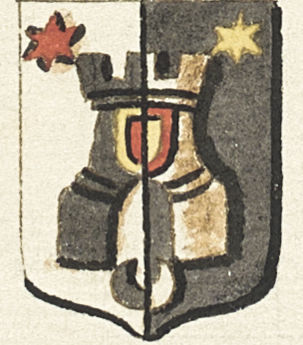
Peter van Dievoet's arms from roll of arms of the Drapery Court of Brussels

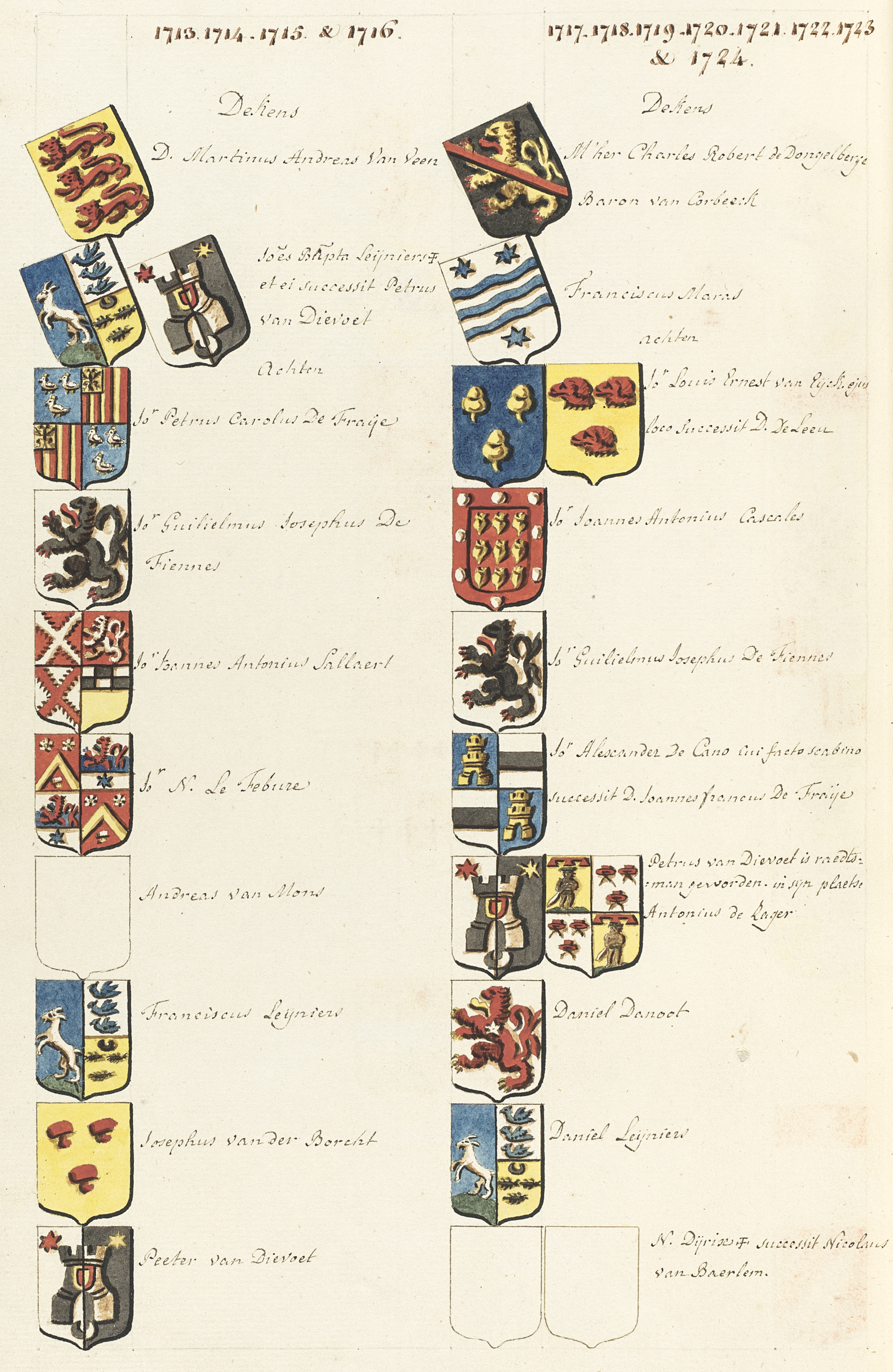
Van Dievoet's arms are featured on this roll of arms of the members of the Drapery Court of Brussels.

== See also ==
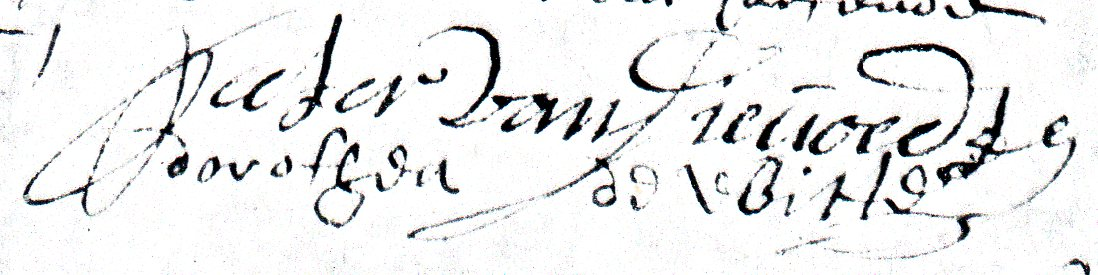
Signatures of Peter van Dievoet and his wife Dorothea de Witte, 17 July 1709.

- Sculpture in Brussels
- Drapery Court of Brussels
- Guilds of Brussels
- Bourgeois of Brussels
- Van Dievoet family
