= List of public art in Trafalgar Square and the vicinity =

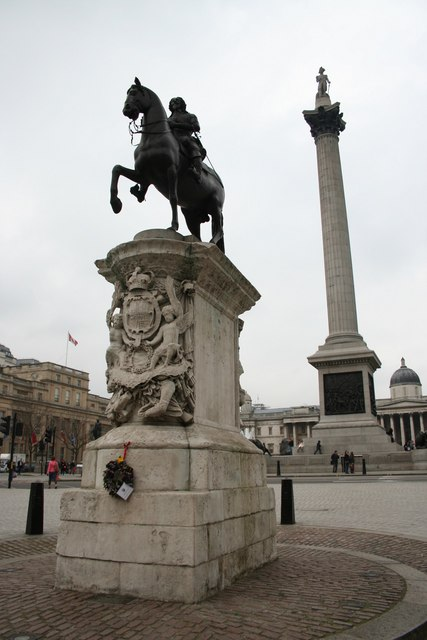
The equestrian statue of Charles I, with Nelson's Column and the National Gallery in the background.

This is a list of public art in and around Trafalgar Square in the City of Westminster, London.

Charing Cross, at the junction of Strand and Whitehall, was the site of the first public monument in what is now the City of Westminster, the cross commissioned by Edward I late in the 13th century in memory of his queen, Eleanor of Castile. Destroyed by order of the Long Parliament in 1647, the Eleanor cross was replaced after the Restoration by the equestrian statue of Charles I by Hubert Le Sueur, the oldest public sculpture now standing in the borough. In 1865 a facsimile of the cross was erected in the forecourt of Charing Cross railway station. Charing Cross was declared the official centre of London in 1831 and a plaque marking this status was installed near Le Sueur's statue in 1955.

Immediately to the north of Charing Cross lies Trafalgar Square, one of London's most famous public spaces. Conceived as part of John Nash's urban improvements, the square was initially developed from the 1820s onwards. Its centrepiece, Nelson's Column, was constructed in 1839–1842. Charles Barry's 1840 redesign of the square provided plinths for equestrian monuments to George IV and William IV, but sufficient funds were never raised for the latter statue. Most of the memorials since added have had a military or naval flavour, an exception being the statue of the physician Edward Jenner, erected in 1858 but moved to Kensington Gardens only four years later. Another work which originally stood on the square is Hamo Thornycroft's statue of General Gordon; this was removed during the Second World War and was reinstalled on the Victoria Embankment in 1953.

Since 1999 the formerly empty fourth plinth on Trafalgar Square has become London's most prominent showcase for temporary new sculpture.

== Admiralty Arch ==
Image	Title / subject	Location and coordinates	Date	Artist / designer	Architect / other	Type	Designation	Notes
	Navigation	Facing the Mall	1911	Thomas Brock	Aston Webb	Architectural sculpture	Grade I	
	Gunnery	Facing the Mall	1911	Thomas Brock	Aston Webb	Architectural sculpture	Grade I	
	Allegorical figures	Facing Trafalgar Square	2024	London Stone Carving	Aston Webb	Architectural sculpture	Grade I	Two female figures based on original drawings by Webb for sculptures which had never been realised.

== Charing Cross ==
Image	Title / subject	Location and coordinates	Date	Artist / designer	Architect / other	Type	Designation	Notes
More images	Statue of Charles I	Charing Cross 51.5073°N 0.1277°W	1633	Hubert Le Sueur	Christopher Wren	Equestrian statue	Grade I	The earliest Renaissance-style equestrian statue in England. Originally commissioned in 1630 by Charles I's Lord High Treasurer, Lord Richard Weston, for his estate in Roehampton. Erected on the site of the Charing Cross in 1674–1675, when it was set on its current pedestal. The reliefs were carved by Joshua Marshall, Master Mason to Charles II.

== Charing Cross station ==
Image	Title / subject	Location and coordinates	Date	Artist / designer	Architect / other	Type	Designation	Notes
More images	Queen Eleanor Memorial Cross Eleanor of Castile	Forecourt of Charing Cross railway station 51.5084°N 0.1254°W	1865	Thomas Earp	Edward Middleton Barry	Memorial with sculpture	Grade II*	A replica of the original Eleanor cross at Charing, with some details inspired by the Oxford Martyrs' Memorial. It stands some distance away from the original location of the Charing Cross.
More images	Platform murals	Charing Cross tube station	1979	David Gentleman	—N/a	Murals	—N/a	The murals on the Northern line platforms depict the construction of the medieval Charing Cross; they are reproduced from woodcuts by Gentleman at twenty times their original size. The murals for the Jubilee and Bakerloo lines feature photographs of Nelson's Column and paintings in the National Gallery.

== Cockspur Street ==
Image	Title / subject	Location and coordinates	Date	Artist / designer	Architect / other	Type	Designation	Notes
	Commerce	Norway House	1914	Louis Frederick Roselieb	Metcalfe & Greig	Relief		
	Transport	Norway House	1914	Louis Frederick Roselieb	Metcalfe & Greig	Relief		
	Industry	Norway House	1914	Louis Frederick Roselieb	Metcalfe & Greig	Relief		
	Communications	Norway House	1914	Louis Frederick Roselieb	Metcalfe & Greig	Relief		
	Asia and Britannia	Brazilian Embassy	1918	Ernest George Gillick	H. W. Stock and A. T. Bolton	Caryatids	Grade II	
	Statue of Olaf II of Norway	Norway House		Gustav Lærum	Johannes Thorvaldsen Westbye (Modification of building by Metcalfe & Grieg)	Statue in niche		

== St Martin's Place ==
Image	Title / subject	Location and coordinates	Date	Artist / designer	Architect / other	Type	Designation	Notes
More images	Memorial to Edith Cavell	St Martin's Place 51.5093°N 0.1272°W	1920	George Frampton	—N/a	Pylon with sculpture	Grade I	Unveiled 17 March 1920 by Queen Alexandra. The earliest World War I memorial project in England; plans for it began soon after Cavell's death in 1915. The inscription FOR KING AND COUNTRY was felt to be a travesty of Cavell's beliefs; in 1924 another was added with her words, PATRIOTISM IS NOT ENOUGH/ I MUST HAVE NO HATRED OR/ BITTERNESS FOR ANYONE.

=== National Portrait Gallery ===
The architectural sculpture of the National Portrait Gallery, on St Martin's Place and Irving Street, is the work of the sculptor Frederick C. Thomas. The three busts over the original main entrance are of the principal supporters of the foundation of the gallery, and the remaining busts are of other biographical writers, historians and portraitists. The architect Ewan Christian's original design for the gallery included a frieze of figures from British history on the top storey, but this was abandoned to save money.

Image	Title / subject	Location and coordinates	Date	Artist / designer	Architect / other	Type	Designation	Notes
	Royal Arms	St Martin's Place façade (over entrance)	c. 1893	Frederick Thomas	Ewan Christian	Relief in lunette	Grade I	
	Mosaic	St Martin's Place façade entrance	c. 1893	Diespeker & Co.	Ewan Christian	Mosaic	Grade I	
	Bust of Thomas Carlyle	St Martin's Place façade (over entrance)	c. 1893	Frederick Thomas	Ewan Christian	Roundel	Grade I	
	Bust of Philip Stanhope, 5th Earl Stanhope	St Martin's Place façade (over entrance)	c. 1893	Frederick Thomas	Ewan Christian	Roundel	Grade I	
	Bust of Thomas Babington Macaulay, 1st Baron Macaulay	St Martin's Place façade (over entrance)	c. 1893	Frederick Thomas	Ewan Christian	Roundel	Grade I	
	Bust of James Granger	St Martin's Place façade (facing north)	c. 1893	Frederick Thomas	Ewan Christian	Roundel	Grade I	
	Bust of William Faithorne	St Martin's Place façade (facing north)	c. 1893	Frederick Thomas	Ewan Christian	Roundel	Grade I	
	Bust of Edmund Lodge	St Martin's Place façade (facing north)	c. 1893	Frederick Thomas	Ewan Christian	Roundel	Grade I	
	Bust of Thomas Fuller	St Martin's Place façade	c. 1893	Frederick Thomas	Ewan Christian	Roundel	Grade I	
	Bust of Edward Hyde, 1st Earl of Clarendon	St Martin's Place façade	c. 1893	Frederick Thomas	Ewan Christian	Roundel	Grade I	
	Bust of Horace Walpole	St Martin's Place façade	c. 1893	Frederick Thomas	Ewan Christian	Roundel	Grade I	
	Bust of Hans Holbein the Younger	Irving Street façade	c. 1893	Frederick Thomas	Ewan Christian	Roundel	Grade I	
	Bust of Anthony van Dyck	Irving Street façade	c. 1893	Frederick Thomas	Ewan Christian	Roundel	Grade I	
	Bust of Peter Lely	Irving Street façade	c. 1893	Frederick Thomas	Ewan Christian	Roundel	Grade I	
	Bust of Godfrey Kneller	Irving Street façade	c. 1893	Frederick Thomas	Ewan Christian	Roundel	Grade I	
	Bust of Louis-François Roubiliac	Irving Street façade	c. 1893	Frederick Thomas	Ewan Christian	Roundel	Grade I	
	Bust of William Hogarth	Irving Street façade	c. 1893	Frederick Thomas	Ewan Christian	Roundel	Grade I	
	Bust of Joshua Reynolds	Irving Street façade	c. 1893	Frederick Thomas	Ewan Christian	Roundel	Grade I	
	Bust of Thomas Lawrence	Irving Street façade	c. 1893	Frederick Thomas	Ewan Christian	Roundel	Grade I	
	Bust of Francis Leggatt Chantrey	Irving Street façade	c. 1893	Frederick Thomas	Ewan Christian	Roundel	Grade I	
More images	The Doors	Irving Street façade	2023	Tracey Emin	Jamie Fobert Architects	Bronze panels	Grade I	45 portrayals of women, intended to counterbalance the male figures represented in the gallery's exterior sculpture.

== Trafalgar Square ==
Image	Title / subject	Location and coordinates	Date	Artist / designer	Architect / other	Type	Designation	Notes
More images	Statue of George IV	North-eastern plinth, Trafalgar Square 51.5083°N 0.1276°W	1830	Francis Legatt Chantrey	Charles Barry	Equestrian statue	Grade II	Originally intended to be the crowning feature of Marble Arch, the decorative scheme of which was cut back after George IV's death. The statue still had no home after Chantrey's death in 1843 and in December of that year it was erected in the newly laid-out Trafalgar Square.
More images	Statue of Horatio Nelson, 1st Viscount Nelson	Centre of Trafalgar Square 51.5077°N 0.1279°W	1839–1842	Edward Hodges Baily	William Railton	Statue on column	Grade I	Nelson is shown without an eyepatch, but his portrayal in this statue is not idealised by the standards of the time. The figure is given stability by the coil of rope behind. Portland stone was chosen over bronze as the statue "would [then] not be resorted to as plunder in revolutions".
More images	The Battle of Trafalgar or The Death of Nelson	South face of pedestal of Nelson's Column	1846–1849	John Edward Carew	—N/a	Bas-relief	Grade I	Nelson is depicted immediately after receiving his mortal wound; Captain Hardy turns back towards him whilst sailors to the left take aim at the marksman who dealt the fatal blow. Inscribed at the bottom ENGLAND EXPECTS EVERY MAN WILL DO HIS DUTY.
More images	The Battle of the Nile	North face of pedestal of Nelson's Column	1846–1850	William F. Woodington	—N/a	Bas-relief	Grade I	Nelson has been taken below deck after being wounded in the head during the attack on the French fleet in Abu Qir Bay. Captain Edward Berry stands by his side.
More images	The Bombardment of Copenhagen	East face of pedestal of Nelson's Column	1846–1854	John Ternouth	—N/a	Bas-relief	Grade I	Nelson, on board his flagship HMS Elephant, applies his seal to an ultimatum directed at the Crown Prince of Denmark. The city of Copenhagen is visible in the background.
More images	The Battle of Cape St Vincent	West face of pedestal of Nelson's Column	1846–1854	Musgrave Watson and William F. Woodington	—N/a	Bas-relief	Grade I	Nelson is on board a Spanish ship, the San Nicolas. A Spanish officer kneels in front of Nelson, surrendering the swords of his fellow officers. Watson died in 1847 before he could complete the work.
More images	Statue of Charles James Napier	South-western plinth, Trafalgar Square 51.5077°N 0.1286°W	1855	George Gammon Adams	—N/a	Statue	Grade II	Unveiled 26 November 1856. Napier holds a scroll out in his right hand, a gesture which symbolises the giving of government to Sindh. The statue was much criticised, The Art Journal calling it "perhaps the worst piece of sculpture in England".
More images	Statue of Henry Havelock	South-eastern plinth, Trafalgar Square 51.5079°N 0.1274°W	1861	William Behnes	—N/a	Statue	Grade II	Unveiled 10 April 1861. The pedestal is inscribed at the front with a quotation from one of Havelock's pre-battle speeches, and to the rear with a list of British and Indian regiments commanded by him during the Indian Mutiny. This was the first statue ever to be modelled from a photograph.
More images	Four lions	At the foot of Nelson's Column	1867	Edwin Landseer	—N/a	Statues	Grade I	Unveiled 31 January 1867. Landseer, an animal painter with no previous experience in sculpture, was assisted by Carlo Marochetti.
More images	Bust of John Jellicoe, 1st Earl Jellicoe	Balustrade of Trafalgar Square 51.5083°N 0.1278°W	1948	Charles Wheeler	Edwin Lutyens	Bust	Grade II*	The Jellicoe and Beatty memorials were unveiled on 21 October 1948 (Trafalgar Day) by the Duke of Gloucester. Each memorial consists of a fountain (adapted from those designed by Charles Barry and installed in 1845) with two bronze sculptural groups and, up against the north wall of the square, a bust of the admiral in question.
	Jellicoe Memorial Fountain	Western fountain of Trafalgar Square 51.5080°N 0.1284°W	1948	Charles Wheeler	Edwin Lutyens	Fountain with two sculptural groups	Grade II*	For both memorial fountains Lutyens retained Barry's cusped quatrefoil-shaped basins and added the vase-shaped central fountains. In the Jellicoe fountain, one of the bronze groups comprises a mermaid with two merchildren and dolphins perched on a shell; the other has a triton with a merchild and dolphins on a shell.
More images	Bust of David Beatty, 1st Earl Beatty	Balustrade of Trafalgar Square 51.5084°N 0.1277°W	1948	William McMillan	Edwin Lutyens	Bust	Grade II*	During the 2003 refurbishment of the square the busts were moved to the eastern side of the new steps; they previously faced their associated fountains. A square plaque near the centre of the square marks the dedication of the fountains and busts: THESE FOUNTAINS AND/ THE BUSTS AGAINST THE/ NORTH WALL OF THE/ SQUARE WERE ERECTED/ BY PARLIAMENT TO THE/ MEMORY OF THE ADMIRALS OF/ THE FLEET EARL JELLICOE/ AND EARL BEATTY TO THE/ END THAT THEIR ILLUSTRIOUS/ SERVICES TO THE STATE/ MIGHT NEVER BE FORGOTTEN
	Beatty Memorial Fountain	Eastern fountain of Trafalgar Square 51.5081°N 0.1277°W	1948	William McMillan	Edwin Lutyens	Fountain with two sculptural groups	Grade II*	One bronze sculptural group consists of a mermaid riding on a dolphin and holding smaller dolphins under her arms, with a shoal of small sharks in the rear; the other has an equivalent grouping with a triton in place of the mermaid.
	Drinking fountain	East terrace wall of Trafalgar Square	1960	Stephen Dykes Bower	Charles Barry	Drinking fountain	Grade II*	Commissioned by the Metropolitan Drinking Fountain Association.
More images	Bust of Andrew Cunningham, 1st Viscount Cunningham of Hyndhope	Balustrade of Trafalgar Square 51.5083°N 0.1280°W	1967	Franta Belsky	—N/a	Bust	Grade II*	Unveiled 2 April 1967 by the Duke of Edinburgh. The bust contains a half-pint bottle of Guinness and a note written by the sculptor.
	Endangered Species and portrait heads	Grand Buildings, Strand and Northumberland Avenue	c. 1991	Barry Baldwin	Sidell Gibson and Associates	Reliefs	—N/a	
	Tile murals	Subway under Trafalgar Square	1992	FreeForm Arts Trust	—N/a	Tile murals	—N/a	A scheme depicting scenes from the history of Trafalgar Square.

=== National Gallery ===
The architectural sculpture of the National Gallery was originally intended for John Nash's Marble Arch. Construction of the latter was begun in 1827 but ceased after the death of George IV in 1830.

Image	Title / subject	Location and coordinates	Date	Artist / designer	Architect / other	Type	Designation	Notes
More images	Statue of James II	Lawn in front of the south façade 51.5085°N 0.1291°W	1686	Peter van Dievoet and Laurens van der Meulen for the Workshop of Grinling Gibbons	—N/a	Statue	Grade I	Commissioned by the royal servant Tobias Rustat for a site outside the Palace of Whitehall. One of three statues of Stuart monarchs commissioned by him, the others being those of Charles II at the Chelsea Royal Hospital and Windsor Castle. It was erected on the present site in 1946.
	Minerva	East façade	c. 1826	John Flaxman; completed by Edward Hodges Baily	William Wilkins	Architectural sculpture	Grade I	Conceived as a figure of Britannia brandishing a trident and a shield bearing the head of Nelson. When Flaxman died in 1826 the work was continued by Baily; he also recarved the shield and replaced the trident with a spear.
	Europe and Asia	Main portico, south façade	c. 1827–1830	John Charles Felix Rossi	William Wilkins	Sculptural group	Grade I	This group previously represented Europe and Asia Exalting Wellington. The relief of the Duke of Wellington's head which originally occupied the central shield now hangs inside the National Gallery's offices.
	Victories and Trophies	East and west entrance porticoes, south façade	c. 1827–1830	Attributed to Edward Hodges Baily	William Wilkins	Statues in niches	Grade I	These figures' weapons were removed and in some cases replaced by artistic implements.
More images	Statue of George Washington	Lawn in front of the south façade 51.5087°N 0.1276°W	1921	Gorham Manufacturing Company, after Jean-Antoine Houdon	—N/a	Statue	Grade II	Unveiled 30 June 1921. A bronze cast of Houdon's 1796 marble statue for the Virginia State Capitol. The state of Virginia offered the cast to London in 1914 to mark the centenary of the Treaty of Ghent, and thus of Anglo-American peace.

=== St Martin-in-the-Fields ===
Image	Title / subject	Location and coordinates	Date	Artist / designer	Architect / other	Type	Designation	Notes
	Royal coat of arms	Portico of St Martin-in-the-Fields	c. 1721–1726	Christopher Cass, Senior	James Gibbs	Pediment relief	Grade I	
More images	John Law Baker Memorial Drinking Fountain	Churchyard of St Martin-in-the-Fields 51.5087°N 0.1263°W	1886	?	—N/a	Drinking fountain with sculpture	Grade II	A truncated fluted column with lion's-head fountains on two sides, their basins now filled in. Inscribed IN MEMORY OF JOHN LAW BAKER/ FORMERLY OF THE MADRAS ARMY/ BORN 1789‍—‌DIED 1886.
More images	William Gilson Humphry Memorial Drinking Fountain	Adelaide Street, adjacent to corner with Duncannon Street 51.5087°N 0.1260°W	1886	?	—N/a	Drinking fountain	Grade II	A basic granite drinking fountain set into the churchyard wall of St Martin's, where Humphry was vicar from 1815 until his death in 1886. Restored with a replica bronze lion mash spout in about 1989, but this is no longer visible on the memorial.
	St Martin's School War Memorial	St Martin-in-the-Fields Church Path 51.5091°N 0.1263°W	after 1918	?	George Ledwell Taylor	Relief tablet	Grade II*	
More images	A Conversation with Oscar Wilde	Adelaide Street, near St Martin-in-the-Fields 51.5088°N 0.1259°W	1998	Maggi Hambling	—N/a	Memorial with sculpture	—N/a	Unveiled 30 November 1998. A bronze sculpture of Wilde's head and hand (complete with cigarette) emerges from a granite, coffin-shaped plinth. Inscribed with a quotation from Lady Windermere's Fan (1892): We are all/ in the gutter/ but some of us/ are looking at/ the stars.
More images	Christ Child	Portico of St Martin-in-the-Fields 51.5088°N 0.1271°W	1999	Michael Chapman	—N/a	Sculpture	—N/a	A relief of a newborn baby with the umbilical cord still uncut, seemingly emerging from a block of Portland stone. The inscription running around the sides reads IN THE BEGINNING/ WAS THE WORD‍—‌AND THE/ WORD BECAME FLESH/ AND LIVED AMONG US/ St John 1:1,14.
	Poem Natalie Skilbeck	St Martin-in-the-Fields Church Path 51.5090°N 0.1261°W	2008	Tom Perkins (lettering)	Eric Parry	Inscription around balustrade	—N/a	The balustrade of a light well is inscribed with a poem by Andrew Motion in stainless steel letters, individually cast. Natalie Skilbeck was a traveller on her gap year killed in a road accident in Mauritius in 2004.

=== South Africa House ===
Image	Title / subject	Location and coordinates	Date	Artist / designer	Architect / other	Type	Designation	Notes
More images	Statue of Bartolomeu Dias	South Africa House, Trafalgar Square	1934	Coert Steynberg	Herbert Baker	Statue in niche	Grade II*	
More images	Winged springbok	South Africa House, Trafalgar Square	1934	Charles Wheeler	Herbert Baker	Architectural sculpture	Grade II*	

== See also ==
- Fourth plinth, Trafalgar Square
- Statue of Edward Jenner, London
- Statue of General Gordon

== Bibliography ==
- Blackwood, John (1989). London's Immortals: The Complete Outdoor Commemorative Statues. London and Oxford: Savoy Press. ISBN 978-0951429600.
- Bradley, Simon; Pevsner, Nikolaus (2003). London 6: Westminster. The Buildings of England. London and New Haven: Yale University Press. ISBN 978-0-300-09595-1.
- Conlin, Jonathan (2006). The Nation's Mantelpiece: A History of the National Gallery. London: Pallas Athene. ISBN 978-1-84368-018-5.
- Crookham, Alan (2009). The National Gallery. An Illustrated History. London: National Gallery Company. ISBN 9-781-85709-463-3.
- Hulme, Graham; Buchanan, Brian; Powell, Kenneth (2000). The National Portrait Gallery: An Architectural History. London: National Portrait Gallery Publications. ISBN 9781855142930.
- Mace, Rodney (2005). Trafalgar Square: Emblem of Empire. London: Lawrence and Wishart. ISBN 1-905007-11-6.
- Ovenden, Mark (2013). London Underground by Design. London: Penguin. ISBN 978-1846144172.
- Ward-Jackson, Philip (2011). Public Sculpture of Historic Westminster: Volume 1. Public Sculpture of Britain. Vol. 14. Liverpool: Liverpool University Press. ISBN 978-1-84631-691-3.
- Webb, Brian; Skipwith, Peyton (2009). David Gentleman: Design. Woodbridge: Antique Collectors' Club. ISBN 978-1851495955.
- Westminster City Council. Statues and Monuments in Westminster: Guidance for the Erection of New Monuments Supplementary Planning Document (PDF).
- White, Jerry (2011). London in the Nineteenth Century: 'A Human Awful Wonder of God'. Random House. ISBN 9781446477113.
