= Bust of John Jellicoe =

Bust in London, England

Coordinates: 51.508346°N 0.127834°W

Bust of John Jellicoe, 1st Earl Jellicoe
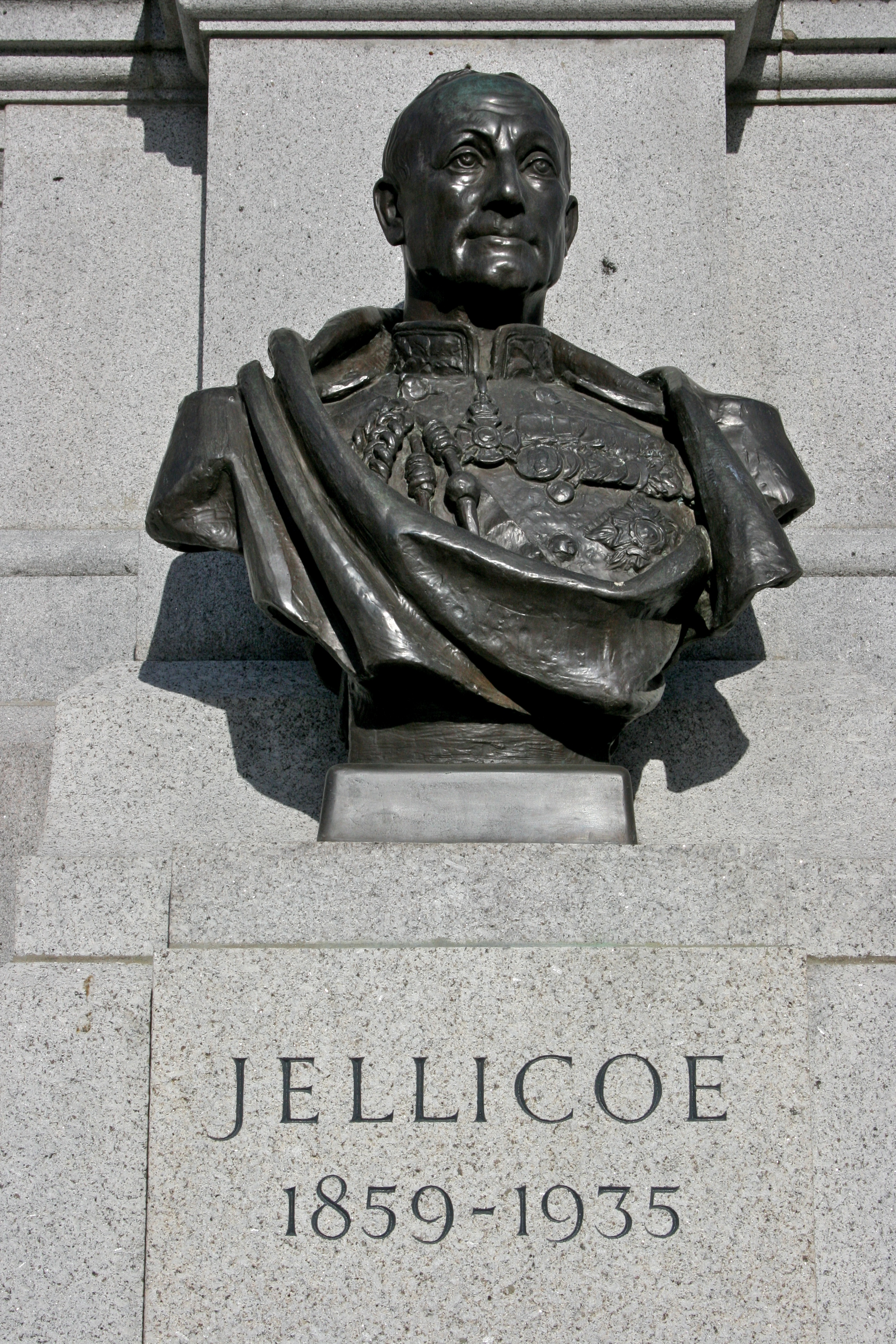
- Artist: Charles Wheeler
- Completion date: 1948
- Subject: John Jellicoe, 1st Earl Jellicoe
- Location: Trafalgar Square, London, England

A Bust of John Jellicoe, stands in Trafalgar Square in London. Alongside the western fountain of the square it forms part of a memorial scheme dedicated to World War I Royal Navy officer John Jellicoe, 1st Earl Jellicoe.

== Background ==
John Rushworth Jellicoe first joined the Royal Navy in 1872, seeing action in the Boxer Rebellion. He is best known for being in command of the Grand Fleet during the First World War, particularly in the most significant naval engagement of the war, the Battle of Jutland. Jellicoe took a cautious approach in the battle, leading to a relatively indecisive British victory. His role in the battle has also been compared to that of Admiral Beatty, whose bust and fountain form the other half of the overall memorial scheme.

In the early 20th century various proposals for new monuments were considered for the square. Edwin Lutyens proposed in 1911 a memorial to Edward VII, and following the First World War, the Board of the Admiralty wished to produce a naval memorial in the square, consisting of a grand figure of Britannia against the terrace accompanied by a surrounding frieze.

== History ==
Eventually, a decision was promoted by Stanley Baldwin in parliament to produce a new memorial to Jellicoe alongside David Beatty, another admiral of the First World War following Jellicoes death in 1935 and Beatty's in 1936. Various sites were considered including moving the existing the statue of Napier and of Havelock to make way for the new statues which was met with resistance from the army. Sites around the Admiralty and Admiralty Arch were also considered.

In 1937, First Commissioner of the Works Sir Philip Sassoon agreed with the suggestion to create the memorials in fountain form. Lutyens first designed the memorials, consisting of busts upon plinths in the centre of the fountains of the square. Instead, William McMillan and Charles Wheeler were asked to provide designs. They gave sculptural groups for the restrained new designs for the fountains by Lutyens, but had to be kept in storage for the Second World War. Charles Wheeler provided the design of Jellicoe's bust.

It was decided after the war for the busts to go up instead on against the northern wall of the square. The memorial was unveiled on Trafalgar Day in 1948 by Prince Henry, Duke of Gloucester. The two busts were originally placed directly behind their respective fountains, but moved with the remodelling of Trafalgar Square in 2003 to be, alongside the later bust of Admiral Cunningham, on the east side. The memorials were all awarded Grade II* listed status in 1970.
