= Bust of Andrew Cunningham =

Bust in London, England

Coordinates: 51.508325°N 0.127968°W

- Artist: Franta Belsky
- Completion date: 1967
- Subject: Andrew Cunningham
- Location: Trafalgar Square, London, England

A Bust of Andrew Cunningham, 1st Viscount Cunningham of Hyndhope by Franta Belsky, stands in Trafalgar Square in London.

== Background ==
Andrew Cunningham was an Admiral in the Royal Navy. In his early career he served in the First World War, receiving a Distinguished Service Order. He is perhaps best known though for his aggressive naval strategy during the Second World War, and his role as First Sea Lord from 1943.

== History ==
Following Cunningham's death in 1963, an appeal for the erection of a memorial for Cunningham through public subscription was announced on Trafalgar Day in 1965. By 1966, Franta Belsky was selected to provide the sculpture. Belsky largely used photographic material as a basis for his work, producing a 'realistic study' before his final 'more subjective' design. The final bust is said to contain an empty half pint bottle of Guinness as well as a note from Belsky.

The bust was unveiled on the 2nd of April 1967 by the Prince Philip, Duke of Edinburgh. It joined the busts of John Jellicoe and David Beatty, both First World War admirals whose memorial scheme had been in the square from 1948. The busts were associated with a fountain each, with sculptural groups added as part of the memorials. Cunningham's bust was placed in the northwest corner of the square, although following a 2003 remodelling all three were moved to the eastern section of the north wall. The three memorials were all awarded Grade II* listed status in 1970.

== See also ==
- Bust of David Beatty
- Bust of John Jellicoe
