= Equestrian statue of George IV, Trafalgar Square =

Sculpture by Francis Legatt Chantrey

George IV
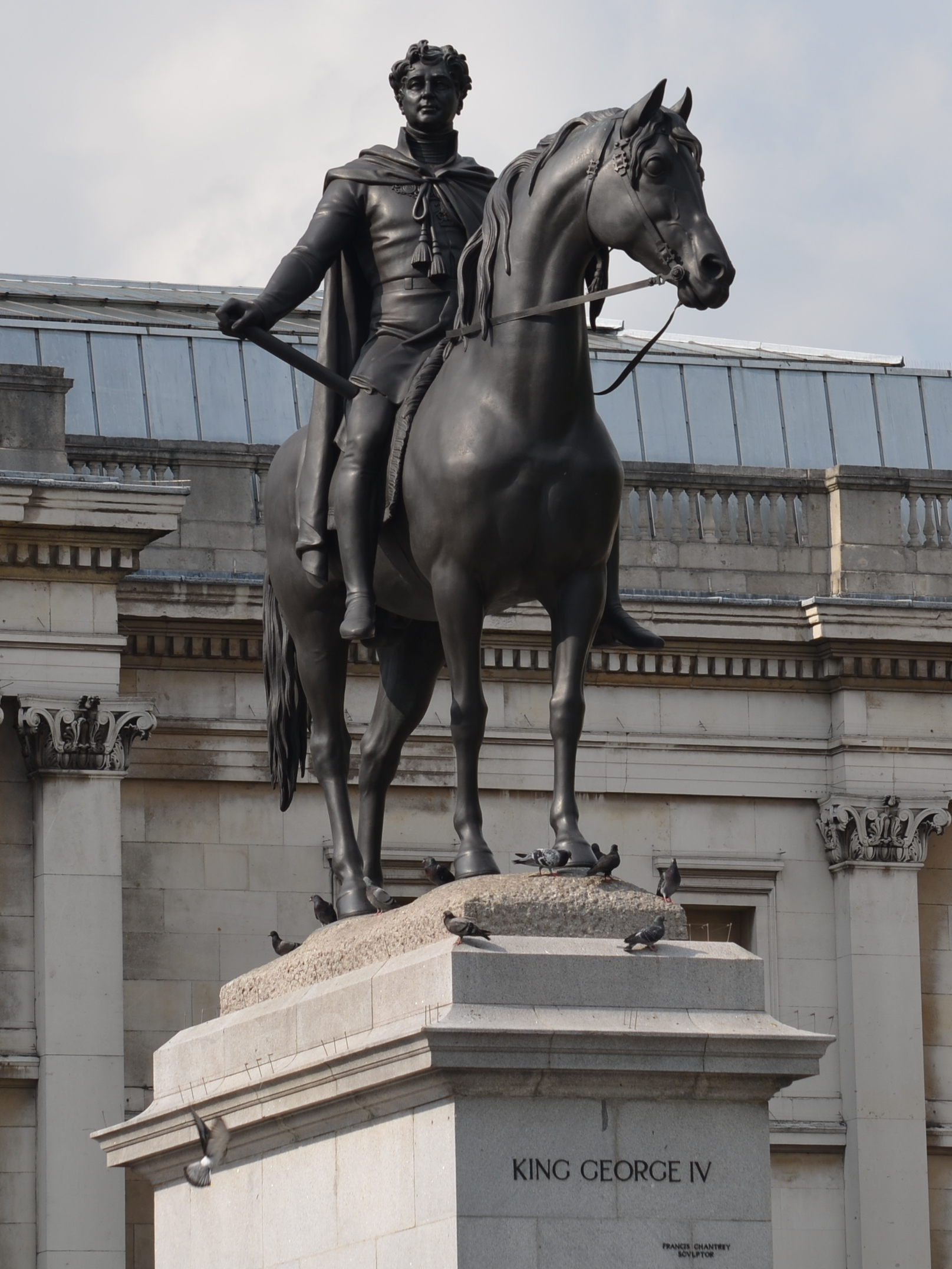
- The statue in 2013
- Artist: Sir Francis Leggatt Chantrey
- Year: 1843 (unveiled)
- Type: Equestrian statue
- Medium: Bronze
- Location: Trafalgar Square; London WC2; 51.50838°N 0.12759°W

Listed Building – Grade II
- Official name: Statue of George IV
- Designated: 5 February 1970
- Reference no.: 1275350

The statue of George IV in Trafalgar Square, London, is a bronze equestrian statue by Sir Francis Legatt Chantrey. It depicts the King dressed in ancient Roman attire and riding bareback. The sculpture was originally designed to sit on top of the Marble Arch at the entrance to Buckingham Palace, but was placed in its current location following the King's death.

== History ==
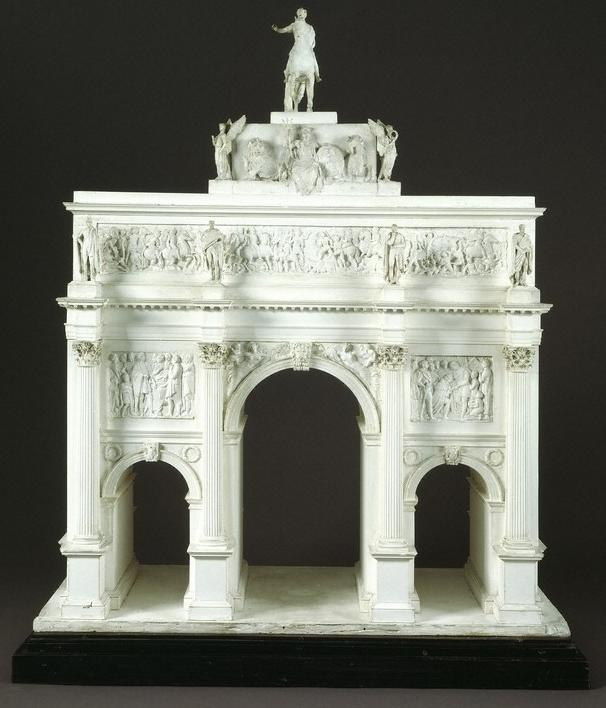
Model of John Nash's original design for Marble Arch, featuring the statue of George IV on top of the arch

Sir Francis Leggatt Chantrey originally designed the statue to stand on top of Marble Arch in its original position as the entrance to Buckingham Palace, following architecture work by John Nash. Edward Blore took over the work, and his redesign to reduce costs removed the Chantrey statue. Chantrey's work was funded by George IV himself, rather than by public subscription. The statue was cast in 1828.

George IV died in 1830, and the statue was placed on an empty plinth in Trafalgar Square in December 1843, which was expected to be on a temporary basis, however it has remained there ever since. It was unveiled to little ceremony, with The Times describing it as "somewhat suddenly erected". It was the first statue erected on one of the pedestals, which were installed three years earlier with architect Charles Barry expecting them to be filled by groups of statues. An inscription was added towards the end of the 19th century as the public were no longer aware of whom it portrayed.

The journalist Janice Turner questioned the need for a statue of George IV in Trafalgar Square in 2005; in rebuttal Lord Baker of Dorking argued that the monarch still deserved the statue due to his town planning legacy which remained in London.

In 2012, the milliner Stephen Jones created crowns for both George IV and his horse to be added to the statue as part of the "Hatwalk" art project sponsored by the Mayor of London; in the project 21 milliners created new hats for famous statues around London.
