= Statue of Charles James Napier, Trafalgar Square =

Statue in London by George Gammon Adams

Statue of Charles James Napier
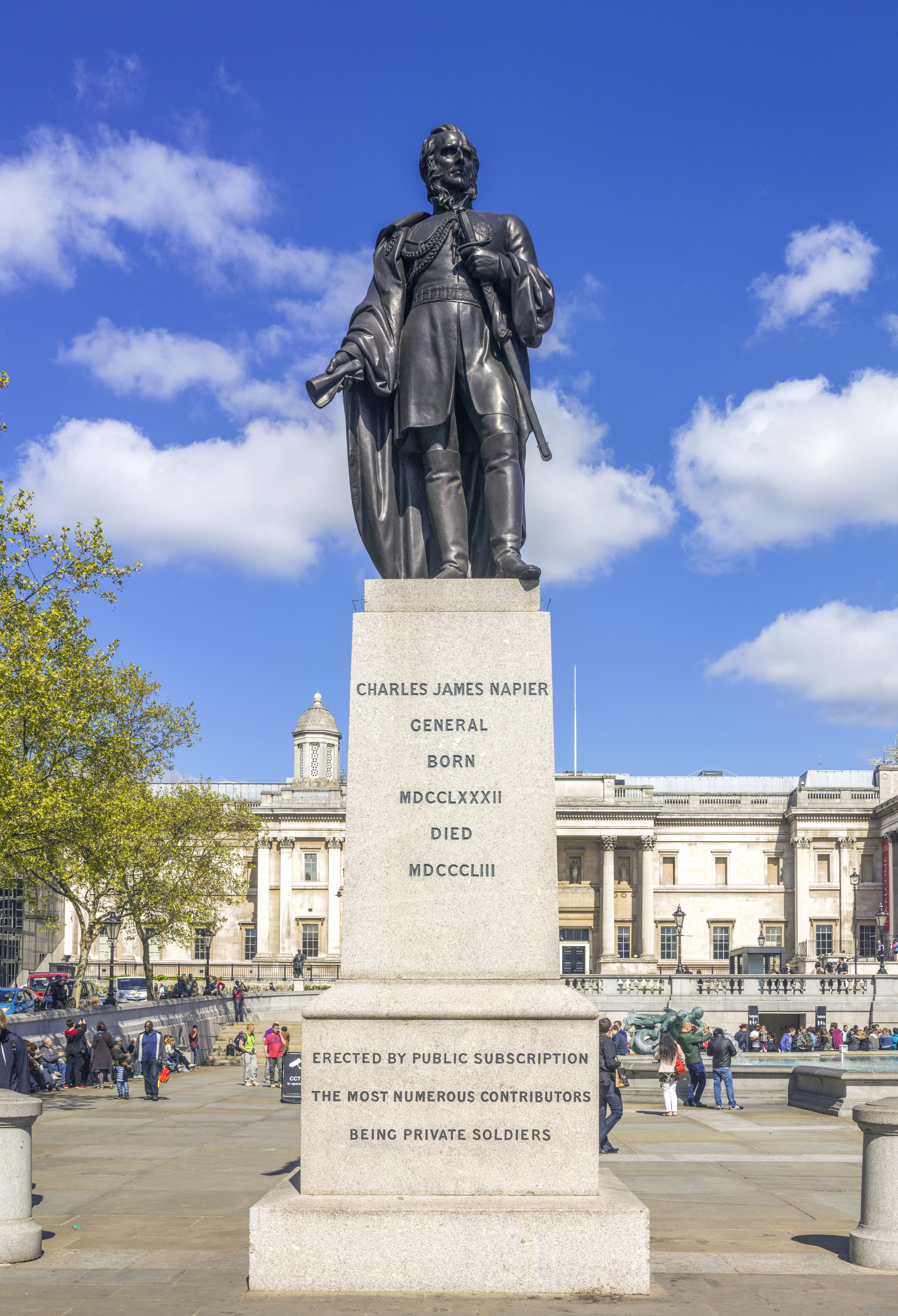
- The statue in 2014
- Artist: George Gammon Adams
- Medium: Bronze sculpture
- Subject: Charles James Napier
- Location: London, United Kingdom; 51.5077°N 0.1285°W

A bronze statue of Charles James Napier by the sculptor George Gammon Adams stands in Trafalgar Square in London, United Kingdom. It occupies one of the four plinths in Trafalgar Square, the one to the southwest of Nelson's Column.

== Background ==
General Sir Charles James Napier GCB (not to be confused with his cousin and close contemporary, the Admiral Charles John Napier) was born in 1782 and died in 1853, 19 days after his 71st birthday. He was an officer in the British Army, and served in the Peninsular War, the War of 1812, and later in India. In 1843 he captured Sindh and was made its first Governor, holding the post until his first return to England in October 1847. In 1849 he was appointed Commander-in-Chief in India and held the post until February 1851, when he returned again to England and retired.

Napier was chief of troops in the north of England between 1839 and 1841, during the early Chartist protests against low wages and poor conditions in Britain's factories. Although Napier's diaries show some sympathy with the Chartists' demands, he was responsible for using his troops to suppress the protests.

== Description and history ==
The bronze sculpture stands on a tall granite pedestal, creating a monument about 12 feet (3.7 m) high. Napier is depicted standing, bareheaded, wearing military uniform with a cloak. He holds up his scabbard in his left hand, with a scroll in his right hand symbolising his governorship of Sind. It was erected in 1855–6 by means of public subscriptions, the most numerous contributors being private soldiers. It bears an inscription stating that Napier was "born in MDCCLXXXII and died LXXI years later in MDCCCLIII". It was quickly criticised as being one of the worst pieces of sculpture in England.

A similar marble statue of Napier, also by George Gammon Adams, stands in the Crypt of St Paul's Cathedral, with Napier similarly in uniform and bearheaded, with his right hand resting on his sword and his left hand on his hip holding a scroll.

In 1936 it was suggested that the statues of Generals Napier and Havelock in Trafalgar Square should be replaced by statues of Admirals Beatty and Jellicoe, the naval commanders at the Battle of Jutland in 1916, but a place was eventually found for bronze busts of the Edwardian admirals (and later for Admiral Cunningham) against the north wall of the square, without removing the statues of the Victorian generals from their plinths.

It became a Grade II listed building in 1970. Trafalgar Square is itself Grade I listed.

In October 2000 the then Mayor of London Ken Livingstone suggested that the statues of Napier and Havelock should be removed from Trafalgar Square, because he didn't have any idea who they were.
