= George Gammon Adams =

English portrait sculptor and medallist

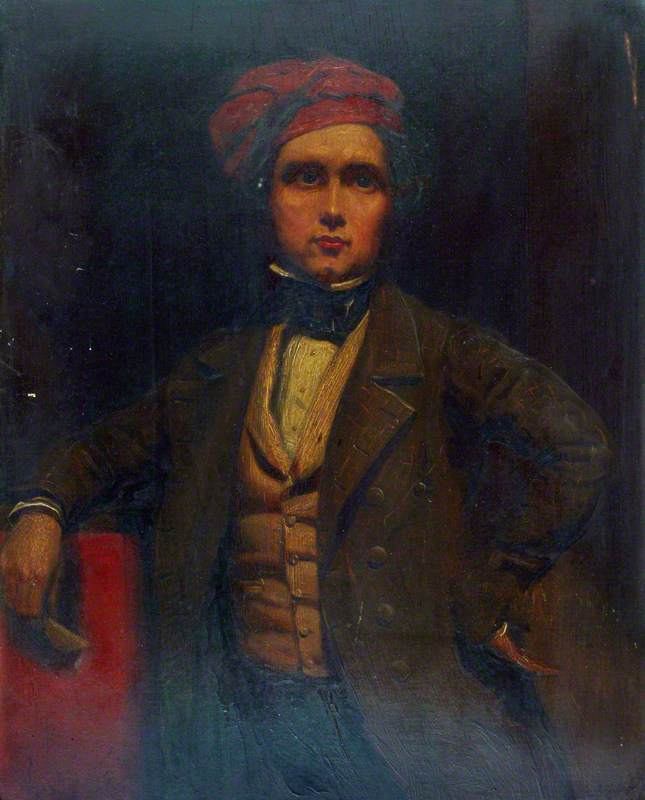
Image of George Gammon Adams

George Gammon Adams (21 April 1821 – 14 March 1898; sometimes spelled George Gamon Adams or George Gannon Adams) was an English portrait sculptor and medallist, noted for his statue of General Charles Napier in Trafalgar Square.

== Life ==
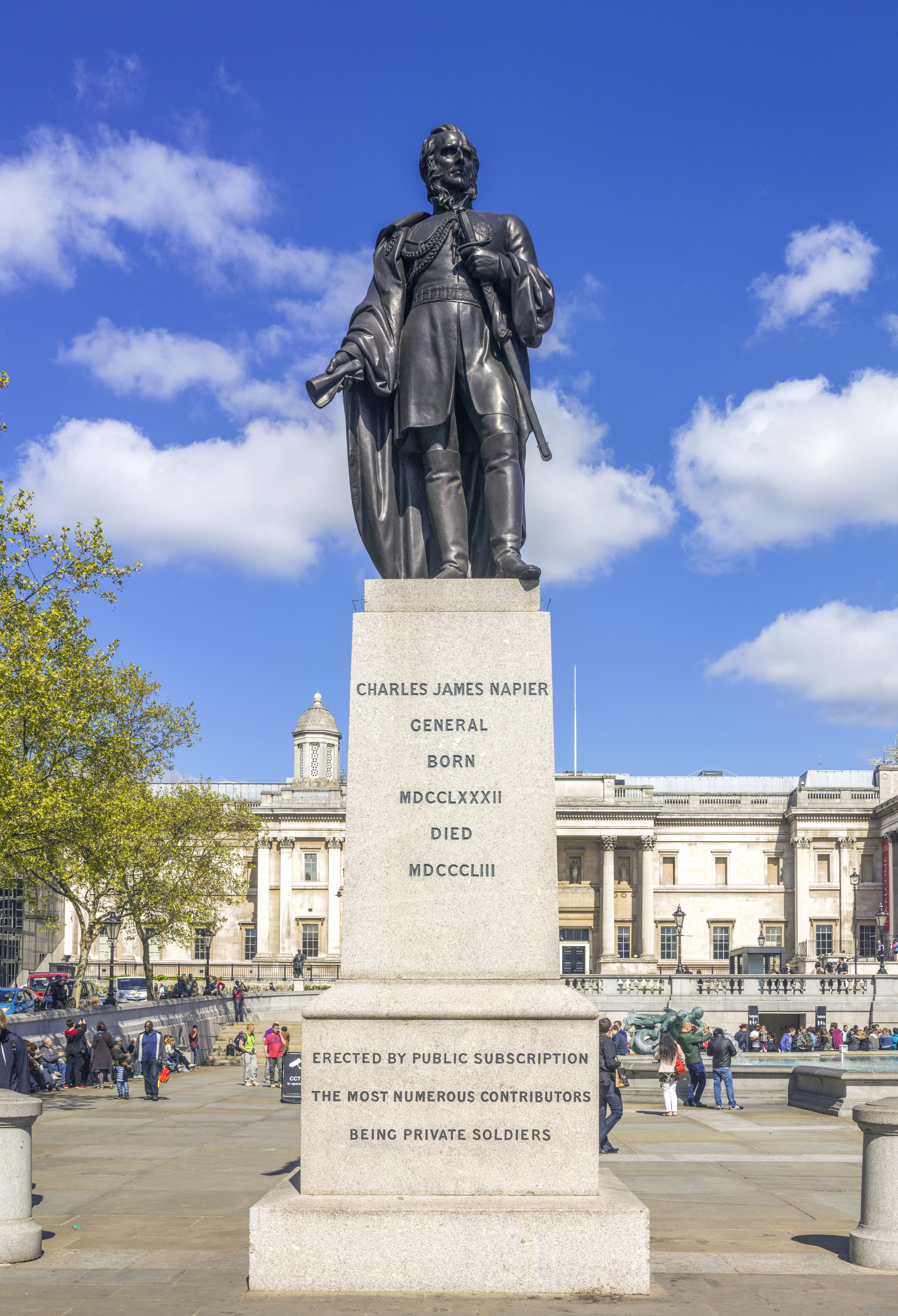
Adams' statue of General Charles Napier in Trafalgar Square

Adams was born on 21 April 1821, in Staines, Middlesex, the son of James Adams upholsterer and auctioneer.

George entered the Royal Academy Schools in 1840 on the recommendation of the medallist William Wyon and trained as a sculptor and medallist. He won a silver medal at the academy in the same year. He was taught to model and cut medals and coin dies by Benedetto Pistrucci.

After a year in Rome studying under John Gibson in 1846, he returned to London and worked for Wyon at the Royal Mint on Tower Hill.

He exhibited several works at the Great Exhibition of 1851, and was one of the three artists whose designs were used on the medals awarded to exhibitors. In the following year he was given the honour of making the death mask of the Duke of Wellington from which he made a marble bust of the Duke.

Over the next two decades he produced busts of notable people and other public monuments.

Adams exhibited at the Royal Academy from 1841 to 1885. He died at his home, Acton Green Lodge in Chiswick, on 14 March 1898.

== Legacy ==
Adams' style has been judged as severe and unsentimental. His 1856 statue of Napier in Trafalgar Square was the subject of unusually wide critical condemnation. The Art Journal wrote, "the slightest attention to natural form and movement is all that is necessary for the condemnation of the statue of Gen Napier, in Trafalgar Sq, as perhaps the worst piece of sculpture in England. The moral and relative worthlessness of the work exceeds tenfold its formal imperfection."

== Works ==
Monuments

- Monument to Captain Henry Langhorne Thompson (1856) in St Paul's Cathedral
- Monument to Sir Duncan MacDougall (1862) in St Paul's Cathedral
- Monument to Rev Gerald Wellesley (1882) at Stratfield Saye
- Monument to Samuel Birch (Egyptologist) (1886) in Highgate Cemetery

Statues

- "An Ancient Briton" at Westminster Hall, 1844
- General Sir Charles Napier, erected on the south-west plinth in Trafalgar Square, 1856
- General Sir Charles Napier for St Paul's Cathedral
- Richard Cobden for Stockport
- Field Marshal John Colborne, 1st Baron Seaton (d.1863), erected 1866 at Mount Wise, Devonport, Plymouth, now at the Military Museum, Winchester.
- Hugh Boyd M'Neile, Dean of Ripon for St George's Hall, Liverpool

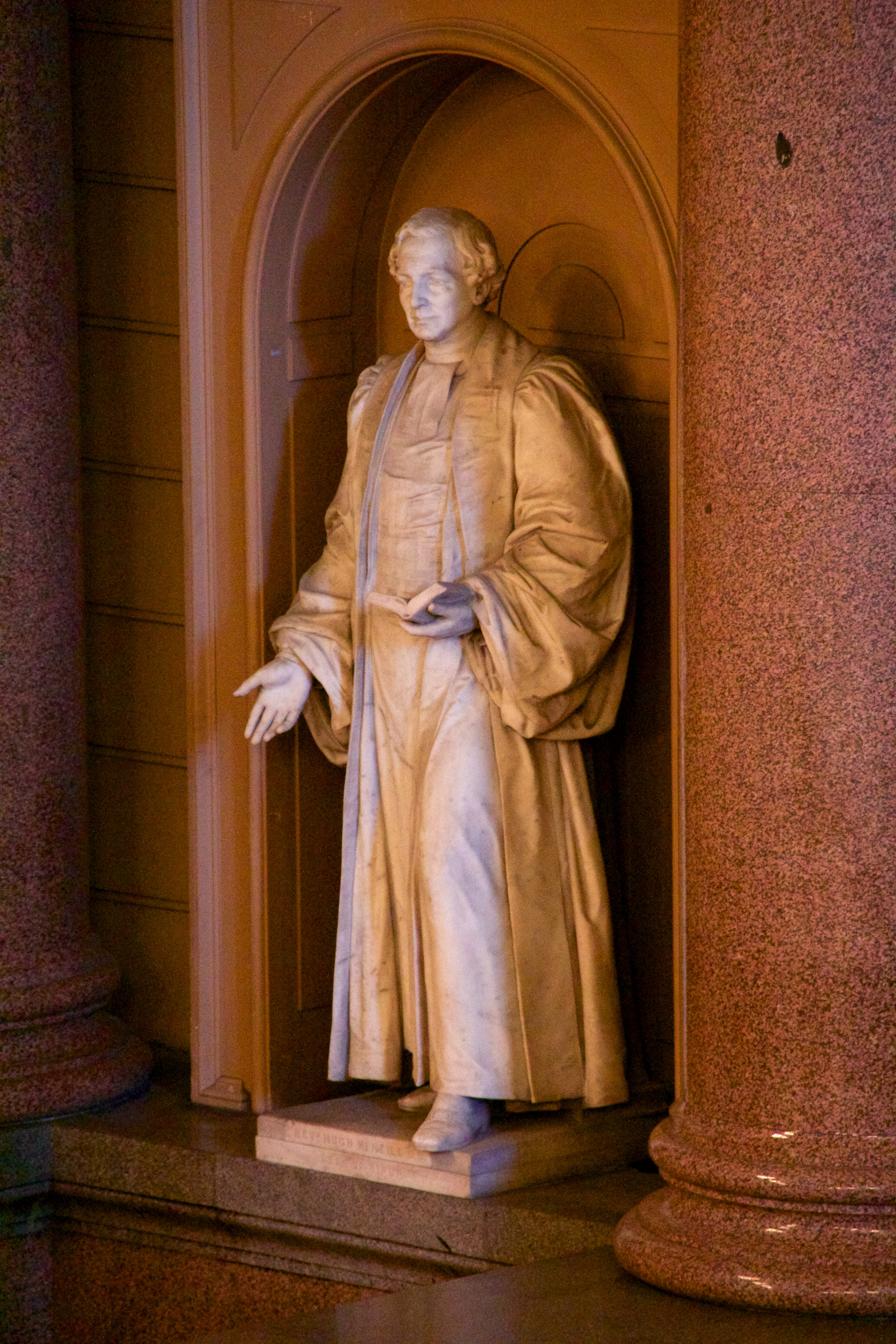
Hugh M'Neile's statue in St Georges Hall, Liverpool

- Sir John Colbourne in Upper Canada College, Toronto
- The Good Shepherd for Saint Stephen's Hall, Palace of Westminster
- Duke of Wellington for Norwich

Busts

- Duke of Wellington, purchased by Queen Victoria, 1853
- Prince George, Duke of Cambridge
- The Prince Consort
- Lord Brougham
- Lord Palmerston
- Sir Henry Havelock
- Sir Charles Napier
- Lord Seaton
- Sir Harry Smith

Medals

- Melpomene, 1841
- Jurors' Medal for The Great Exhibition of 1851, prize of £100
- Medal presented to Queen Victoria and Prince Albert at the opening of The Crystal Palace in Sydenham
- Medal for the Diamond Jubilee of Queen Victoria
- Funeral medal of the Duke of Wellington
- The Opening of Blackfriars Bridge and Holborn Valley Viaduct
- Visit of King George I of the Hellenes to the City of London
- Albert Victor Receives Freedom
- Marriage of the Duke and Duchess of York

Other sculpture

- "The Contest between the Minstrel and the Nightingale", sculpture submitted for a competition for the new Palace of Westminster, 1845
- "The Murder of the Innocents", winner of RA Gold Medal, 1847
- "The Combat of Centaurs and Lapithae" and "Figure with a Torch", shown at the Great Exhibition
