= Statue of Henry Havelock, Trafalgar Square =

Statue in London by William Behnes

Statue of Henry Havelock
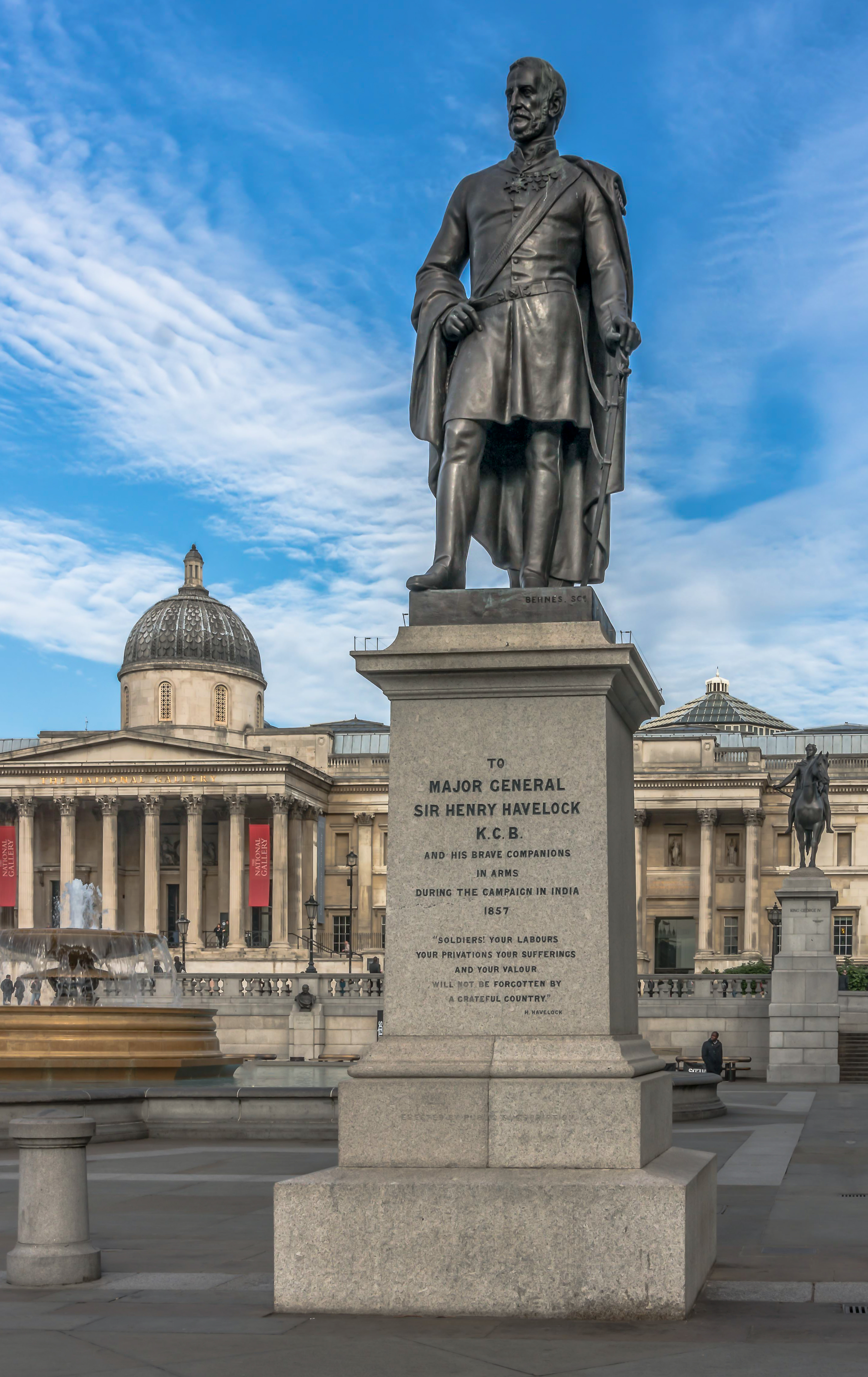
- The statue in 2014
- Artist: William Behnes
- Medium: Bronze sculpture
- Subject: Henry Havelock
- Location: London, United Kingdom; 51.5079°N 0.1274°W

A bronze statue of Henry Havelock by the sculptor William Behnes, stands in Trafalgar Square in London, United Kingdom. It occupies one of the four plinths in Trafalgar Square, the one to the southeast of Nelson's Column.

== Description and history ==
The bronze statue depicts Major General Sir Henry Havelock KCB as a standing figure in military uniform, with a cloak. Havelock was born in 1795 and died in 1857. He served in the First Anglo-Burmese War in the 1820s and the First Anglo-Afghan War in the 1840s. He recaptured Cawnpore and Lucknow during the Indian Mutiny in 1857, shortly before he died of dysentery.

The statue was reputedly one of the first statues to be made from a photograph. It was erected by public subscription in 1861, on a granite plinth, matching the statue of General Charles James Napier erected to the west in 1855–1856. A copy in Mowbray Park in Sunderland was also erected by public subscription and unveiled in 1861.

In 1936, it was suggested that the statues of Generals Havelock and Napier in Trafalgar Square should be replaced by statues of Admirals Beatty and Jellicoe, the naval commanders at the Battle of Jutland in 1916, but a place was eventually found for bronze busts of the Edwardian admirals (and later for Admiral Cunningham) against the north wall of the square, without removing the statues of the Victorian generals from their plinths.

The monument became a Grade II listed building in 1970. Trafalgar Square is itself Grade I listed.

In 2000, the Mayor of London Ken Livingstone suggested that the statues of Havelock and General Charles James Napier should be removed from Trafalgar Square, because he had no idea who they were.
