= Trafalgar Square =

Public square in London, England

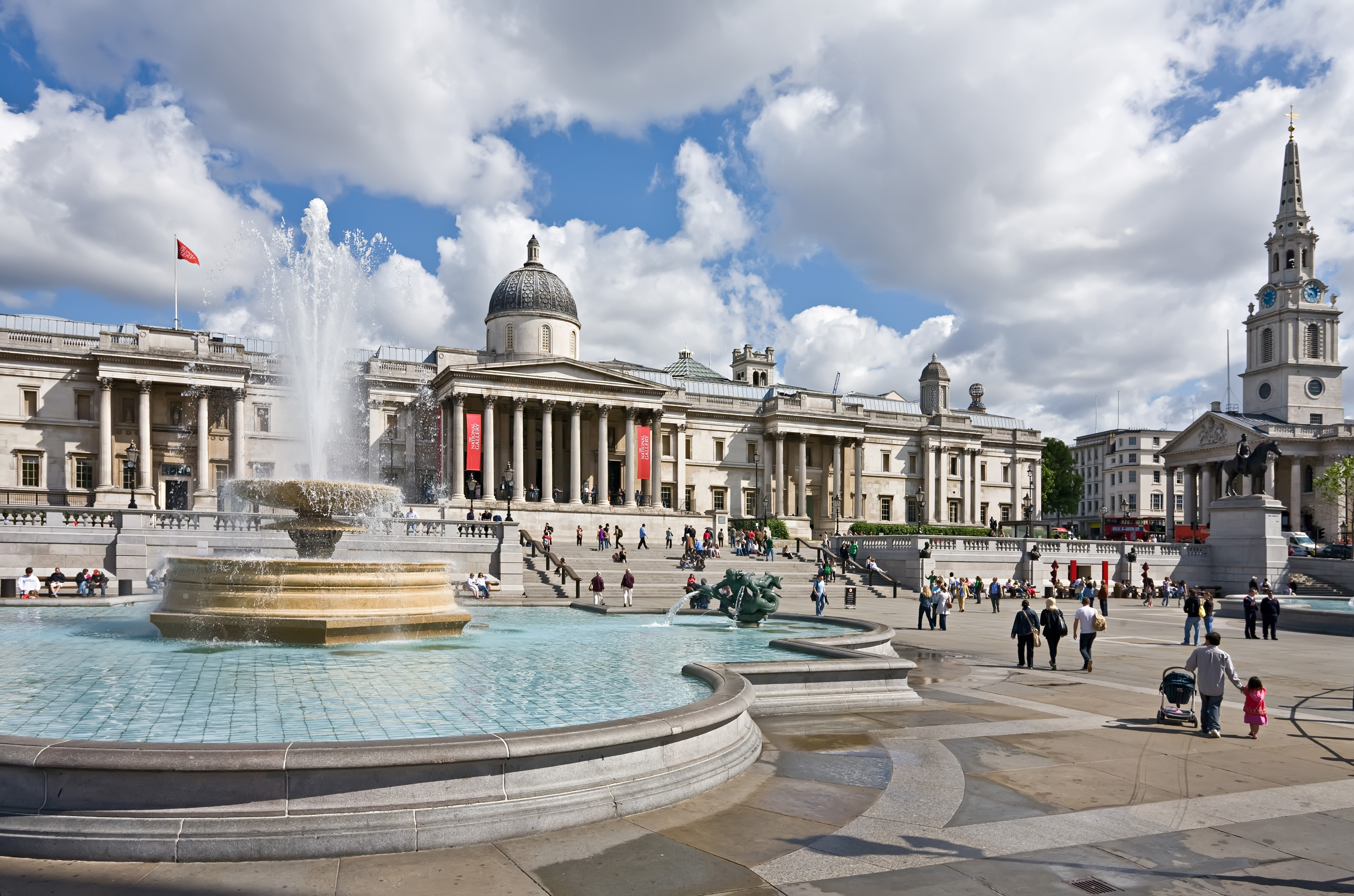
- View of the square in 2009

- Location within City of Westminster
- Former name: Charing Cross
- Namesake: Battle of Trafalgar
- Maintained by: Greater London Authority
- Location: City of Westminster, London, England
- Postal code: WC2
- Coordinates: 51°30′29″N 00°07′41″W
- North: Charing Cross Road
- East: The Strand
- South: Northumberland Avenue; Whitehall
- West: The Mall

Construction
- Completed: c. 1840

Other
- Designer: Sir Charles Barry
- Website: www.london.gov.uk/who-we-are/city-halls-buildings-and-squares/trafalgar-square

Trafalgar Square (/trəˈfælɡər/ trə-FAL-gər) is a public square in the City of Westminster in Central London. It was established in the early 19th century around the area known as Charing Cross. Its name commemorates the Battle of Trafalgar, the British naval victory in the Napoleonic Wars over France and Spain that took place on 21 October 1805 off the coast of Cape Trafalgar.

The area around Trafalgar Square has been a significant landmark since the 1200s, as distances from London are measured from Charing Cross. The King's Mews occupied part of the site until the reign of George IV, who moved them to Buckingham Palace, allowing the area to be redeveloped by John Nash. Progress stalled after the death of Nash in 1835, and the square did not open until 1844. It is faced by buildings including the National Gallery, St Martin-in-the-Fields, Canada House and South Africa House. The square also contains several pieces of public sculpture, including the 169-foot (52 m) Nelson's Column in the centre, which commemorates Vice-Admiral Horatio Nelson's victory at Trafalgar; an equestrian statue of Charles I; and the fourth plinth, which since 1999 has hosted a variety of artworks.

The square has been used for community gatherings and political demonstrations, including Bloody Sunday in 1887, the culmination of the first Aldermaston March, anti-war protests and campaigns against climate change. A Christmas tree has been donated to the square by the government of Norway since 1947 and is erected for twelve days before and after Christmas Day. The square is a centre of annual celebrations on New Year's Eve and was known for its feral pigeons until their removal in the early 21st century.

== Name ==
The square is named after the Battle of Trafalgar, a British naval victory in the Napoleonic Wars with France and Spain that took place on 21 October 1805 off the coast of Cape Trafalgar, southwest Spain, although it was not named as such until 1835.

The name "Trafalgar" is a Spanish word of Arabic origin, derived from either Taraf al-Ghar (طرف الغار 'cape of the cave/laurel') or Taraf al-Gharb (طرف الغرب 'extremity of the west').

== Geography ==
Trafalgar Square is owned by the King in Right of the Crown (Note: "King in Right of the Crown" is legal fiction denoting the land is privately owned by the King and it is legally possible, though unlikely, to be sold to another individual. The Crown Jewels are under similar ownership.) and managed by the Greater London Authority, while Westminster City Council owns the roads around the square, including the pedestrianised area of the North Terrace. The square contains a large central area with roadways on three sides and a terrace to the north, in front of the National Gallery. The roads around the square form part of the A4, a major road running west of the City of London. Originally, traffic travelled both directions around the square until a one-way clockwise gyratory system was introduced on 26 April 1926. In 2003, the northern side was closed and the road width reduced.

Nelson's Column is in the centre of the square, flanked by fountains designed by the English architect Sir Edwin Lutyens between 1937 and 1939 (replacements for two of Peterhead granite, now in Canada) and guarded by four monumental bronze lions sculpted by Sir Edwin Landseer. At the top of the column is a statue of Horatio Nelson, who commanded the British Navy at the Battle of Trafalgar.

Surrounding the square are the National Gallery on the north side and St Martin-in-the-Fields Church to the east. Also on the east is South Africa House, and facing it across the square is Canada House. To the south-west is The Mall, which leads towards Buckingham Palace via Admiralty Arch, while Whitehall is to the south and the Strand to the east. Charing Cross Road passes between the National Gallery and the church.

London Underground's Charing Cross station on the Northern and Bakerloo lines has an exit in the square. The lines had separate stations; the Bakerloo line branch was called Trafalgar Square until the two were linked in 1979 during the construction of the Jubilee line (which was rerouted to Westminster in 1999). Other nearby tube stations are Embankment connecting the District, Circle, Northern and Bakerloo lines, and Leicester Square on the Northern and Piccadilly lines.

Several bus routes run through the square, including routes 3, 6, 9, 11, 12, 13, 15, 23, 24, 29, 53, 87, 88, 91, 139, 159, 176, 453.

A point in Trafalgar Square is regarded as the official centre of London in legislation and when measuring distances from the capital.

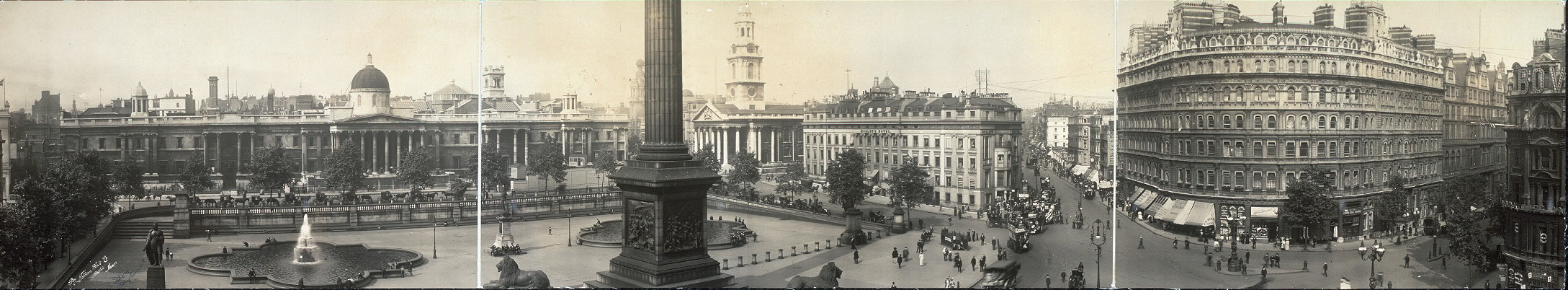
Trafalgar Square, 1908
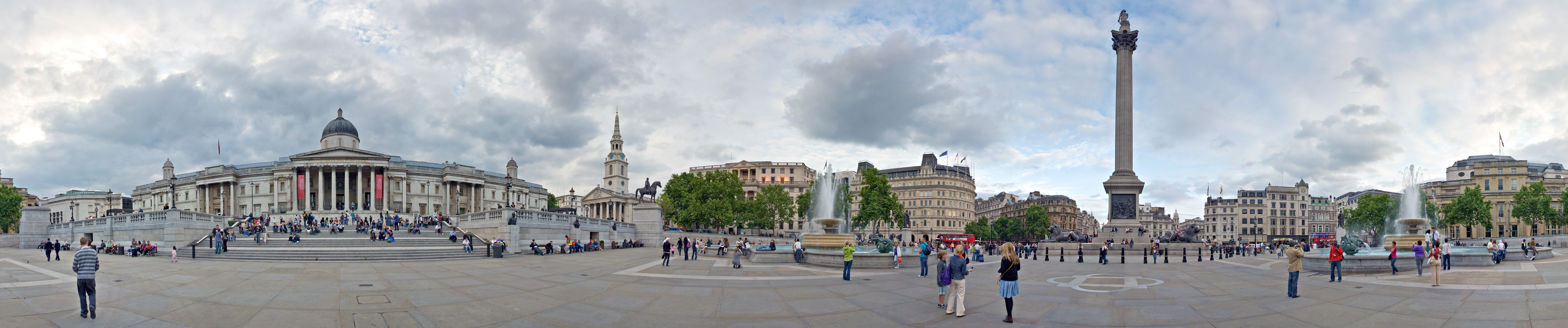
A 360-degree view of Trafalgar Square in 2009

== History ==
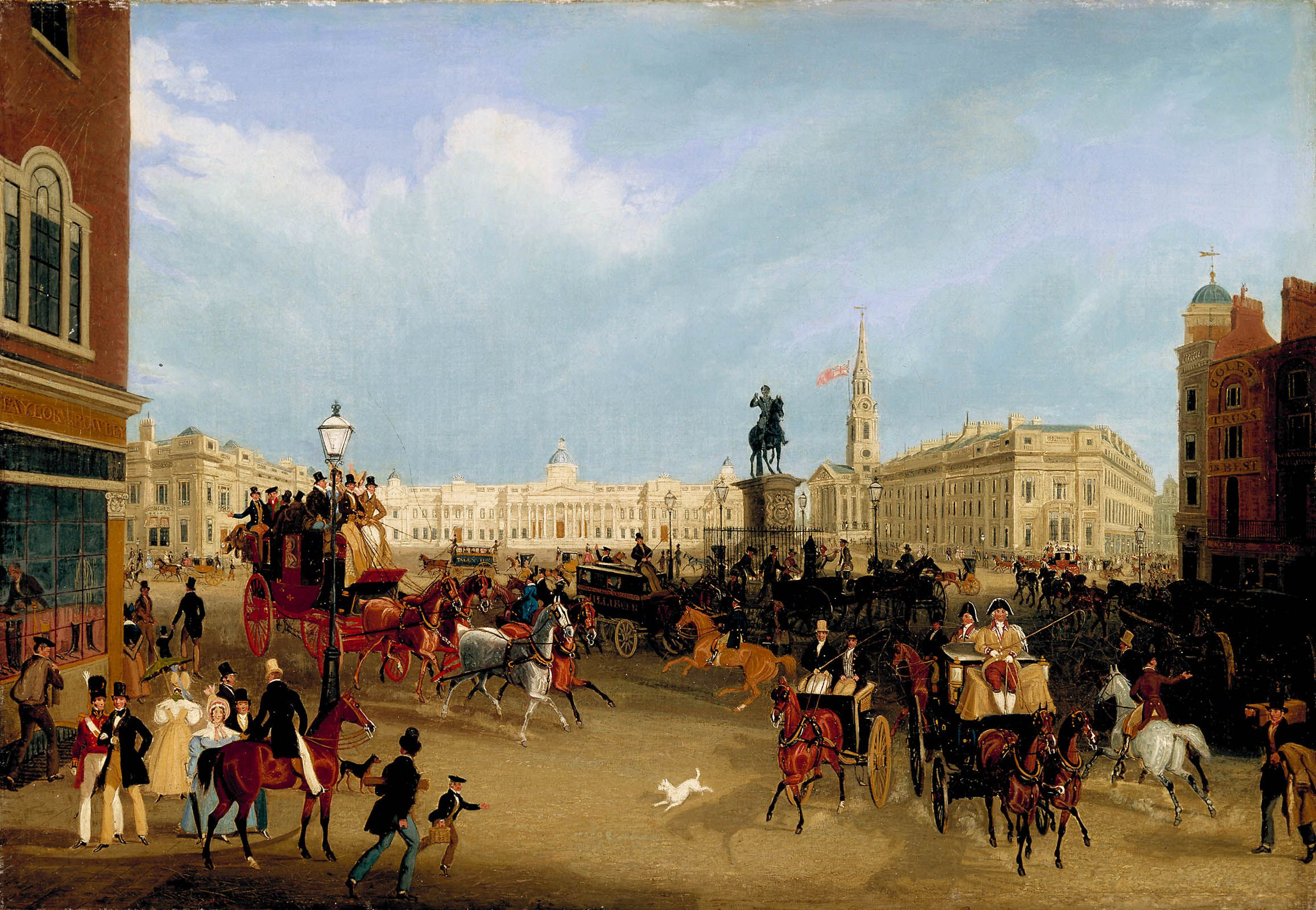
A painting by James Pollard showing the square before the erection of Nelson's Column

Building work on the south side of the square in the late 1950s revealed river terrace deposits containing fossils from the Last Interglacial, around 130-115,000 years ago. Among the findings were the remains of cave lions, rhinoceroses, straight-tusked elephant and hippopotamus, as well as feces of cave hyenas.

The site has been significant since the 13th century. During the reign of Edward I of England it hosted the King's Mews, running north from the T-junction in the south, Charing Cross, where the Strand from the City of London meets Whitehall coming north from Westminster. From the reign of Richard II to that of Henry VII, the mews was at the western end of the Strand. The name "Royal Mews" comes from the practice of keeping hawks here for moulting; "mew" is an old word for this. After a fire in 1534, the mews were rebuilt as stables, and remained here until George IV moved them to Buckingham Palace.

=== Clearance and development ===
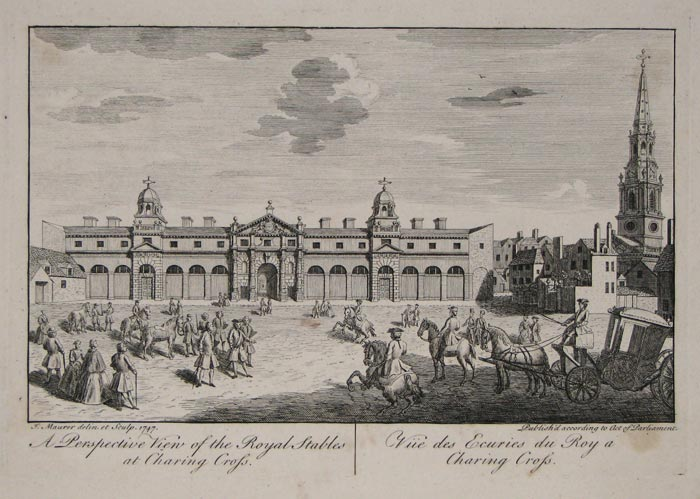
Kent's Royal Stables, with the Great Mews in the foreground, in 1747. (To the right is St Martin-in-the-Fields.)

After 1732 the King's Mews were divided into the Great Mews and the smaller Green Mews to the north by the Crown Stables, a large block, built to the designs of William Kent. Its site is occupied by the National Gallery.

In 1826 the Commissioners of Woods, Forests and Land Revenues instructed John Nash to draw up plans for clearing a large area south of Kent's stable block, and as far east as St Martin's Lane. His plans left open the whole area of what became Trafalgar Square, except for a block in the centre, which he reserved for a new building for the Royal Academy of Arts. The plans included the demolition and redevelopment of buildings between St Martin's Lane and the Strand and the construction of a road (now called Duncannon Street) across the churchyard of St Martin-in-the-Fields. The Charing Cross Act was passed in 1826 and clearance started soon after. Nash died soon after construction started, impeding its progress. The square was to be named after William IV commemorating his accession to the throne in 1830. Around 1835 it was decided that the square would be named after the Battle of Trafalgar as suggested by the architect George Ledwell Taylor, commemorating Nelson's victory over the French and Spanish in 1805 during the Napoleonic Wars.

Ten frames of Trafalgar Square shot by Wordsworth Donisthorpe in 1890

After the clearance development progressed slowly. The National Gallery was built on the north side between 1832 and 1838 to a design by William Wilkins, and in 1837 the Treasury approved Wilkins' plan for the laying out of the square, but it was not put into effect. In April 1840, following Wilkins' death, new plans by Charles Barry were accepted, and construction started within weeks. For Barry, as for Wilkins, a major consideration was increasing the visual impact of the National Gallery, which had been widely criticised for its lack of grandeur. He dealt with the complex sloping site by excavating the main area to the level of the footway between Cockspur Street and the Strand, and constructing a 15-foot (4.6 m) high balustraded terrace with a roadway on the north side, and steps at each end leading to the main level. Wilkins had proposed a similar solution with a central flight of steps. All the stonework was of granite from Aberdeen. In 1845 four Bude-Lights with octagonal glass lanterns were installed. Two, opposite the National Gallery, are on tall bronze columns, and two, in the south-west and south-east corners of the square, on shorter bronze columns on top of wider granite columns. They were designed by Barry and manufactured by Stevens and Son, of Southwark.

In 1841 it was decided that two fountains should be included in the layout. The estimated budget, excluding paving and sculptures, was £11,000. The earth removed was used to level Green Park. The square was originally surfaced with tarmacadam, which was replaced with stone in the 1920s.

Trafalgar Square was opened to the public on 1 May 1844.

=== Nelson's Column ===
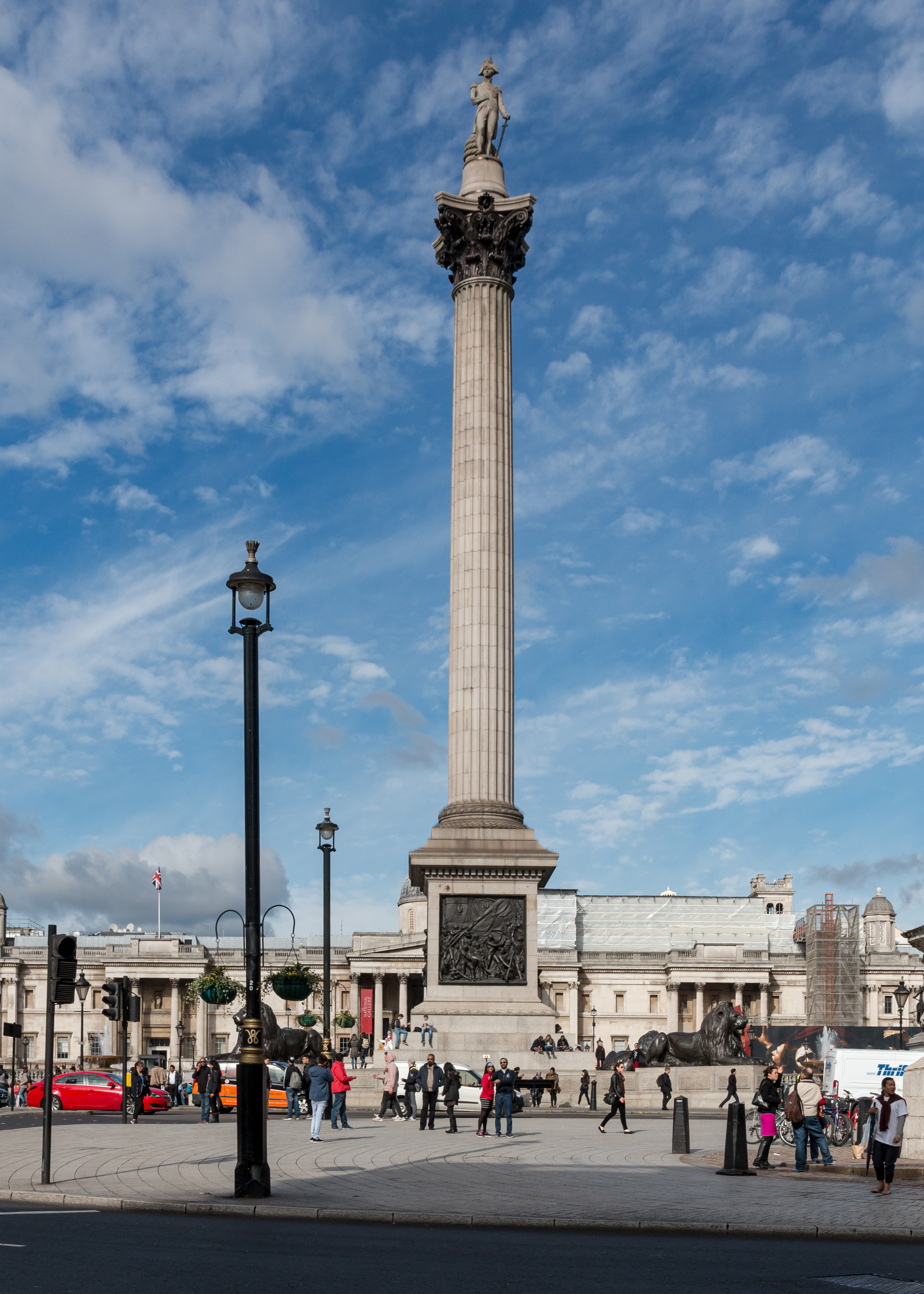
Nelson's Column

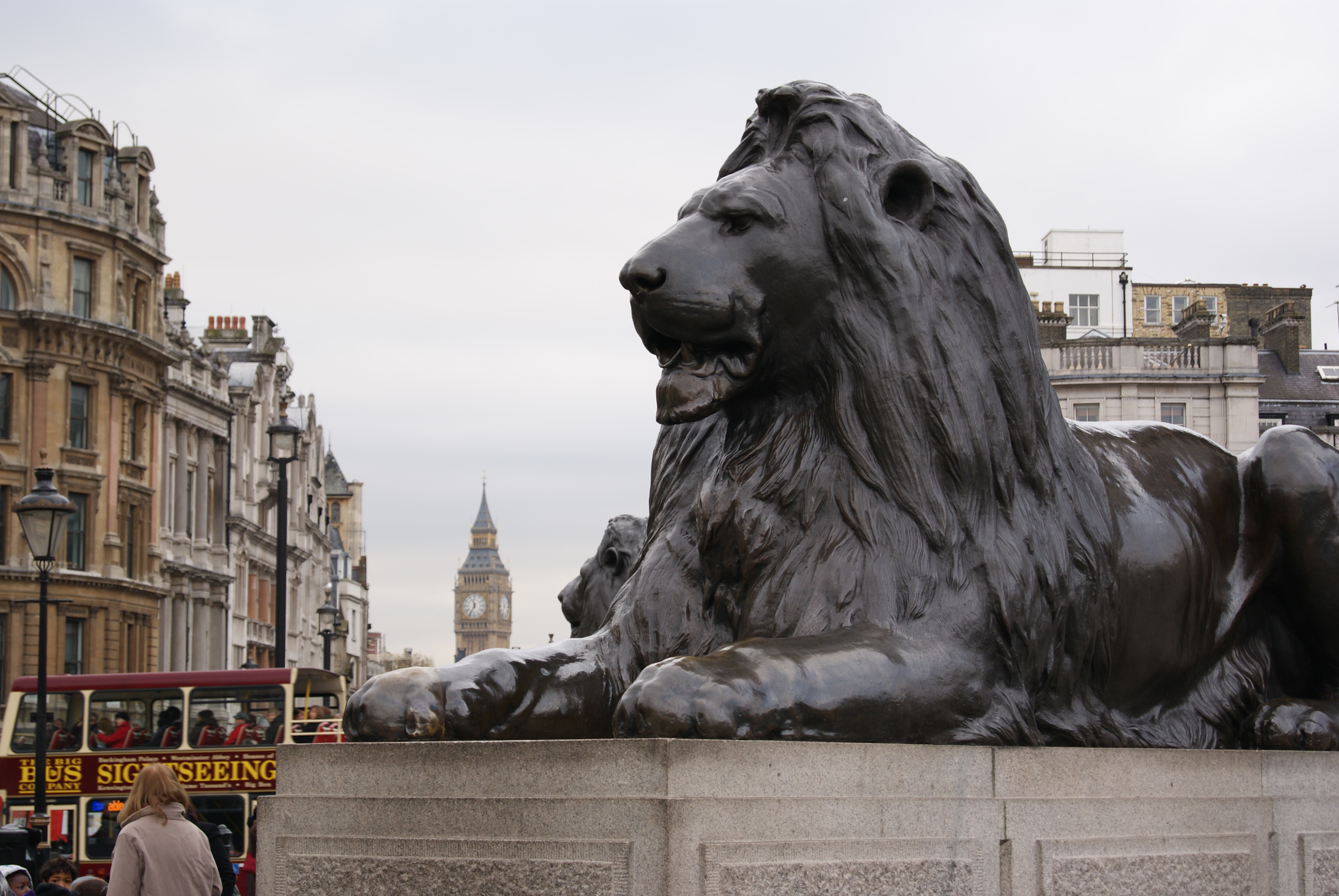
The lions at Nelson's Column were not finished until nearly 30 years after the square opened.

Nelson's Column was planned independently of Barry's work. In 1838 a Nelson Memorial Committee had approached Her Majesty's Government proposing that a monument to the victory of Trafalgar, funded by public subscription, should be erected in the square. A competition was held and won by the architect William Railton, who proposed a 218-foot-3-inch (66.52 m) Corinthinan column topped by a statue of Nelson and guarded by four sculpted lions. The design was approved, but received widespread objections from the public. Construction went ahead beginning in 1840 but with the height reduced to 145 feet 3 inches (44.27 m). The column was completed and the statue raised in November 1843.

The last of the bronze reliefs on the column's pedestals was not completed until May 1854, and the four lions, although part of the original design, were only added in 1867. Each lion weighs seven tons. A hoarding remained around the base of Nelson's Column for some years and some of its upper scaffolding remained in place. Landseer, the sculptor, had asked for a lion that had died at the London Zoo to be brought to his studio. He took so long to complete sketches that its corpse began to decompose and some parts had to be improvised. The statues have paws that resemble cats more than lions.

Barry was unhappy about Nelson's Column being placed in the square. In July 1840, when its foundations had been laid, he told a parliamentary select committee that "it would in my opinion be desirable that the area should be wholly free from all insulated objects of art".

In 1940, during the Second World War, the Schutzstaffel of Nazi Germany developed secret plans to transfer Nelson's Column to Berlin (Note: Hitler had specifically requested that all of Rembrandt's paintings in the National Gallery be seized as part of the move, as he particularly admired the artist's work.) after an expected German invasion, as related by the historian Norman Longmate in If Britain Had Fallen (1972).

The square has been Grade I listed on the Register of Historic Parks and Gardens since 1996.

=== Terrorist bombings ===
The square was the target of two suffragette bombings in 1913 and 1914. This was as part of the suffragette bombing and arson campaign of 1912–1914, in which suffragettes carried out a series of politically-motivated bombing and arson attacks nationwide as part of their campaign for women's suffrage.

The first attack occurred on 15 May 1913. A bomb was planted in the public area outside the National Gallery, but failed to explode. A second attack occurred at St Martin-in-the-Fields church at the north-east corner of the square on 4 April 1914. A bomb exploded inside the church, blowing out the windows and showering passers-by with broken glass. The bomb then started a fire. In the aftermath a mass of people rushed to the scene, many of whom aggressively expressed their anger towards the suffragettes. Churches were a particular target during the campaign, as it was believed that the Church of England was complicit in reinforcing opposition to women's suffrage. Between 1913 and 1914 thirty-two churches were attacked nationwide. In the weeks after the bombing, there were also attacks on Westminster Abbey and St Paul's Cathedral.

=== Redevelopment ===
A major 18-month redevelopment of the square led by W.S. Atkins with Foster and Partners as sub-consultants was completed in 2003. The work involved closing the eastbound road along the north side and diverting traffic around the other three sides of the square, demolishing the central section of the northern retaining wall and inserting a wide set of steps to the pedestrianised terrace in front of the National Gallery. The construction includes two lifts for disabled access, public toilets and a café. Access between the square and the gallery had been by two crossings at the northeast and northwest corners.

== Statues and monuments ==
=== Plinths ===
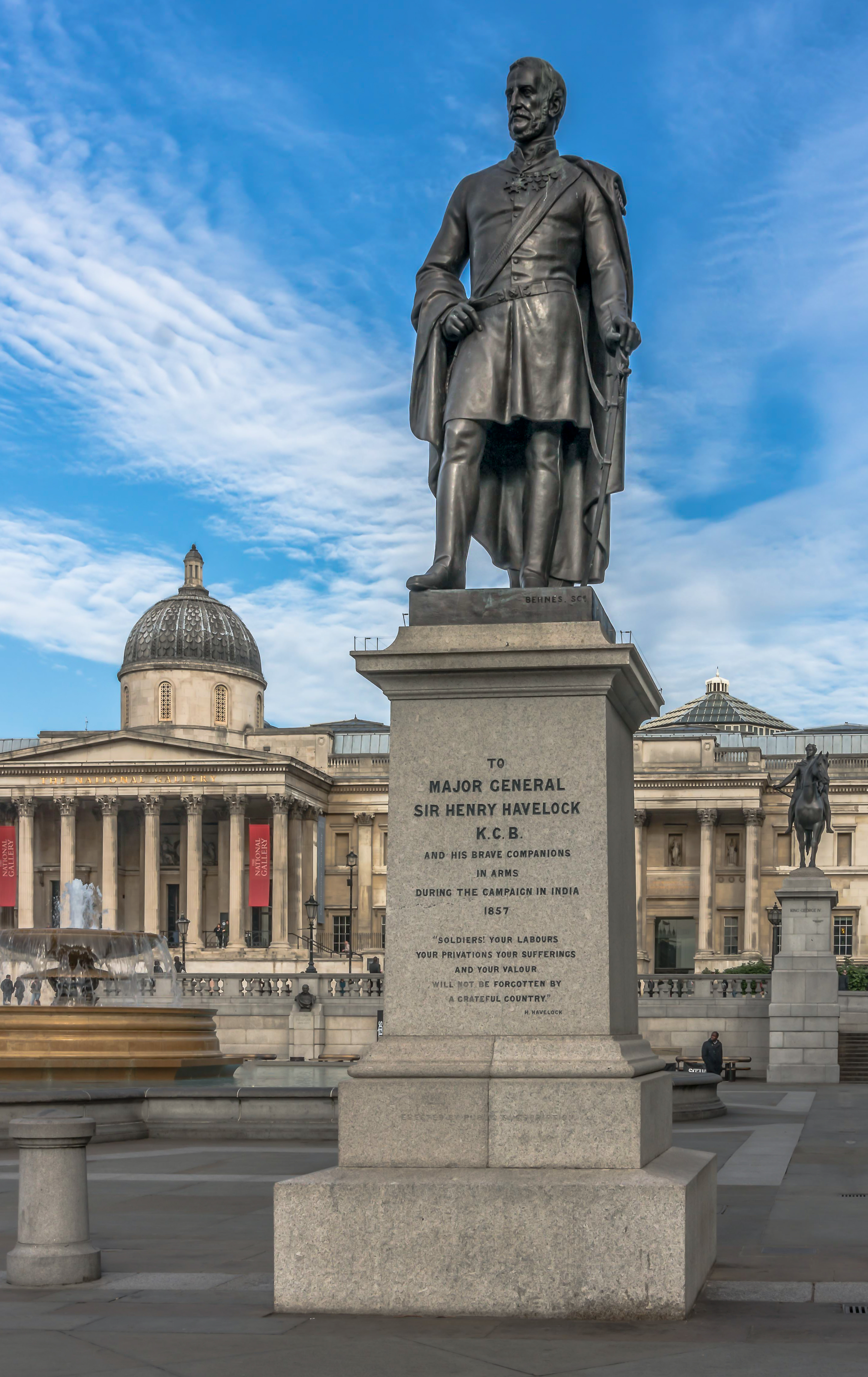
The statue of Sir Henry Havelock by William Behnes

Barry's scheme provided two plinths for sculptures on the north side of the square. A bronze equestrian statue of George IV was designed by Sir Francis Leggatt Chantrey and Thomas Earle. It was originally intended to be placed atop the Marble Arch, but instead was installed on the eastern plinth in 1843, while the other plinths remained empty until late in the 20th century. There are two other statues on plinths, both installed during the 19th century: General Sir Charles James Napier by George Cannon Adams in the south-west corner in 1855, and Major-General Sir Henry Havelock by William Behnes in the south-east in 1861. In 2000 the mayor of London, Ken Livingstone, suggested replacing the statues with figures more familiar to the general public.

==== Fourth plinth ====
In the 21st century the empty plinth in the north-west corner of the square, the "fourth plinth", has been used to show specially commissioned temporary artworks. The scheme was initiated by the Royal Society of Arts and continued by the Fourth Plinth Commission, appointed by the mayor of London.

=== Other sculptures ===
There are three busts of admirals against the north wall of the square. Those of John Jellicoe, 1st Earl Jellicoe (by Sir Charles Wheeler) and David Beatty, 1st Earl Beatty (by William MacMillan) were installed in 1948 in conjunction with the square's fountains, which also commemorate them. The third, of First Sea Lord Andrew Cunningham, 1st Viscount Cunningham of Hyndhope (by the Czech sculptor Franta Belsky) was unveiled alongside them on 2 April 1967.

On the south side of Trafalgar Square, on the site of the original Charing Cross, is a bronze equestrian statue of Charles I by Hubert Le Sueur. It was cast in 1633, and placed in its present position in 1678.

The two statues on the lawn in front of the National Gallery are the statue of James II (designed by Peter van Dievoet and Laurens van der Meulen for the studio of Grinling Gibbons) to the west of the portico, and of George Washington, a replica of a work by Jean-Antoine Houdon, to the east. The latter was a gift from the government of the U.S. state of Virginia, installed in 1921.

Two statues erected in the 19th century have since been removed. One of Edward Jenner, pioneer of the smallpox vaccine, was set up in the south-west corner of the square in 1858, next to that of Napier. Sculpted by William Calder Marshall, it showed Jenner sitting in a chair in a relaxed pose, and was inaugurated at a ceremony presided over by Prince Albert. It was moved to Kensington Gardens in 1862. The other, of General Charles George Gordon by Hamo Thornycroft, was erected on an 18-foot-high pedestal between the fountains in 1888. It was removed in 1943 and re-sited on the Victoria Embankment ten years later.

== Fountains ==
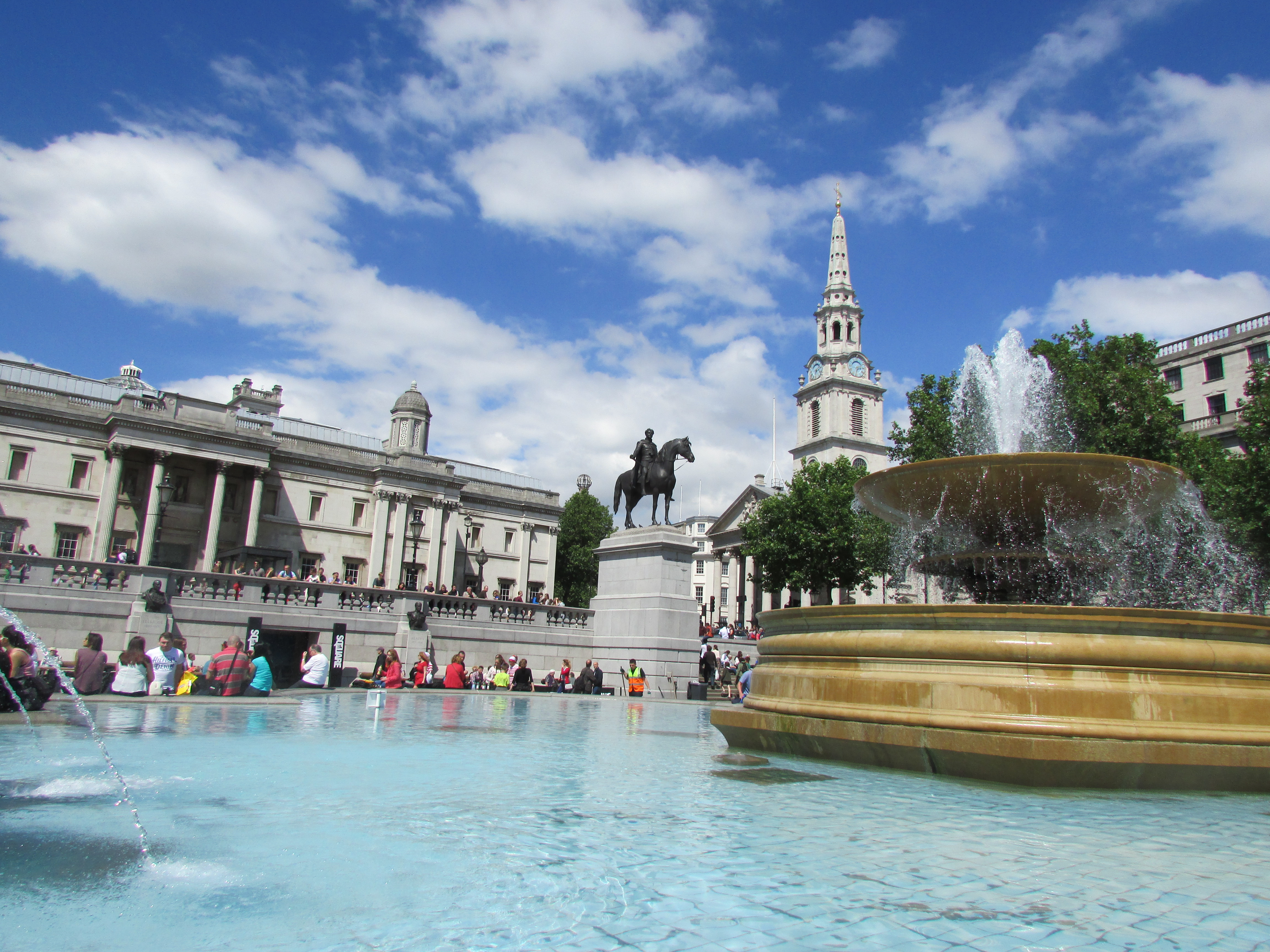
Fountain at Trafalgar Square, 2014

In 1841, following suggestions from the local paving board, Barry agreed that two fountains should be installed to counteract the effects of reflected heat and glare from the asphalt surface. The First Commissioner of Woods and Forests welcomed the plan because the fountains reduced the open space available for public gatherings and reduced the risk of riotous assembly. The fountains were fed from two wells, one in front of the National Gallery and one behind it connected by a tunnel. Water was pumped to the fountains by a steam engine housed in a building behind the gallery.

In the late-1930s it was decided to replace the pump and the centrepieces of the fountains. The new centrepieces, designed by Sir Edwin Lutyens, were memorials to Lord Jellicoe and Lord Beatty, although busts of the admirals, initially intended to be placed in the fountain surrounds were placed against the northern retaining wall when the project was completed after the Second World War. The fountains cost almost £50,000. The original centrepieces were presented to the Canadian government and are now located in Confederation Park in Ottawa and the Wascana Centre in Regina, Saskatchewan.

A programme of restoration was completed by May 2009. The pump system was replaced with one capable of sending an 80-foot (24 m) jet of water into the air. A light-emitting diode lighting system that can project different combinations of colours on to the fountains was installed to reduce the cost of lighting maintenance and to coincide with the 2012 Summer Olympics.

== Events ==
=== Street performance ===
Trafalgar Square is one of London's most popular locations for street performance. Its size, tourist footfall, and acoustic environment make it particularly suited to performers: background noise in the square frequently exceeds 70 decibels. In January 2012, the Greater London Authority confirmed new byelaws for Trafalgar Square, which came into operation on 30 March.

The square's status as a busking venue has been recognised by successive Mayors of London. In 2015, Boris Johnson helped launch the first International Busking Day, with Trafalgar Square at the heart of the event. The following year, Sadiq Khan continued the tradition, with the Busk in London Festival returning to the square in 2016 for nine days, hosting performers from around the world.

In 2016, the National Gallery's director, Gabriele Finaldi, was accused of "moaning" about the buskers outside, after publicly calling for their removal. Finaldi said, "We are going to be talking to Westminster council about that. It would be lovely to make it a space that works for us."

From April 2021, Westminster Council introduced a licensing regime requiring all buskers to obtain a licence and perform only on designated pitches. In March 2025, a judge described busking in Leicester Square as "psychological torture", leaving Trafalgar Square as the sole viable amplified busking pitch in central London. Later that year, the Trafalgar Square pitch was closed to make way for the annual Christmas Market, leaving performers with no amplified pitches anywhere in Westminster during the festive period.

=== New Year ===
For many years, revellers celebrating the New Year have gathered in the square despite a lack of celebrations being arranged. The lack of official events was partly because the authorities were concerned that encouraging more partygoers would cause overcrowding. Since 2003 a fireworks display centred on the London Eye and South Bank of the River Thames has been provided as an alternative. Since 2014 New Year celebrations have been organised by the Greater London Authority in conjunction with UNICEF, who began ticketing the event to control crowd numbers. The fireworks display was cancelled during the COVID-19 pandemic. An event scheduled to take place in the Square to welcome in 2022 was cancelled during the spread of the SARS-CoV-2 Omicron variant.

=== Christmas ===
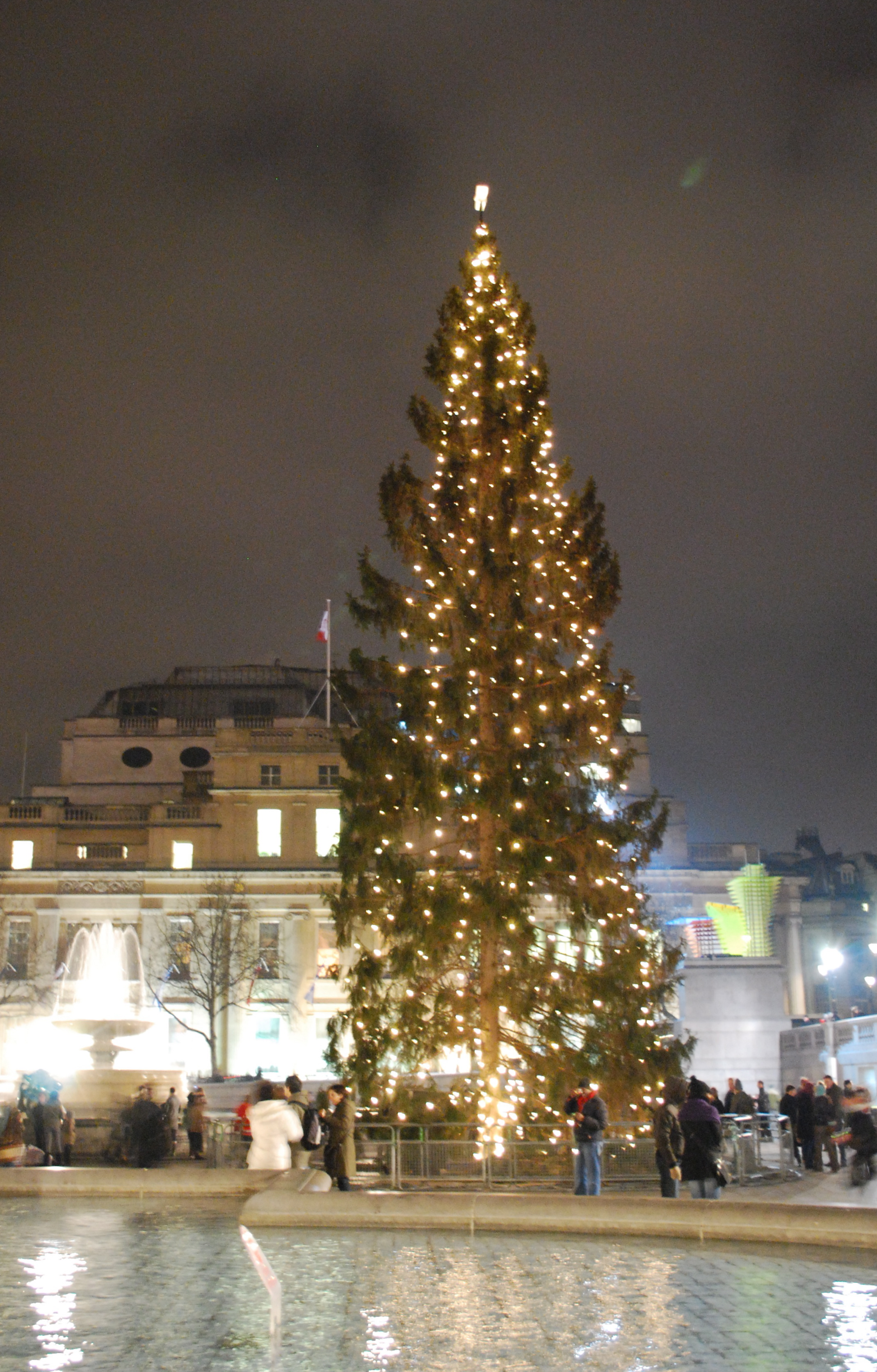
The Trafalgar Square Christmas tree in 2008

A Christmas ceremony has been held in the square every year since 1947. A Norway spruce (or sometimes a fir) is presented by Norway's capital city, Oslo, as London's Christmas tree, a token of gratitude for Britain's support during the Second World War. (Prince Olav and the Norwegian government also lived in exile in London throughout the war.)

The Christmas tree is decorated with lights that are switched on at a seasonal ceremony. It is usually held twelve days before Christmas Day. The festivity is open to the public and attracts a large number of people. The switch-on is usually followed by several nights of Christmas carol singing and other performances and events. On the Twelfth Night of Christmas, the tree is taken down for recycling. Westminster City Council threatened to abandon the event to save £5,000 in 1980 but the decision was reversed.

The tree is selected by the Head Forester from Oslo's municipal forest and shipped across the North Sea to the Port of Felixstowe, then by road to Trafalgar Square. The first tree was 48 feet (15 m) tall, but more recently has been around 75 feet (23 m). In 1987 several protesters chained themselves to the tree. In 1990 a man sawed into the tree with a chainsaw a few hours before a New Year's Eve party was scheduled to take place. He was arrested and the tree was repaired by tree surgeons who removed gouged sections from the trunk while the tree was suspended from a crane.

=== Hanukkah ===
The square has hosted public Hanukkah menorah lightings since 2007, when Mayor Ken Livingstone lit a giant menorah beside the square's Christmas tree; the celebration returned in 2025.

=== Political demonstrations ===
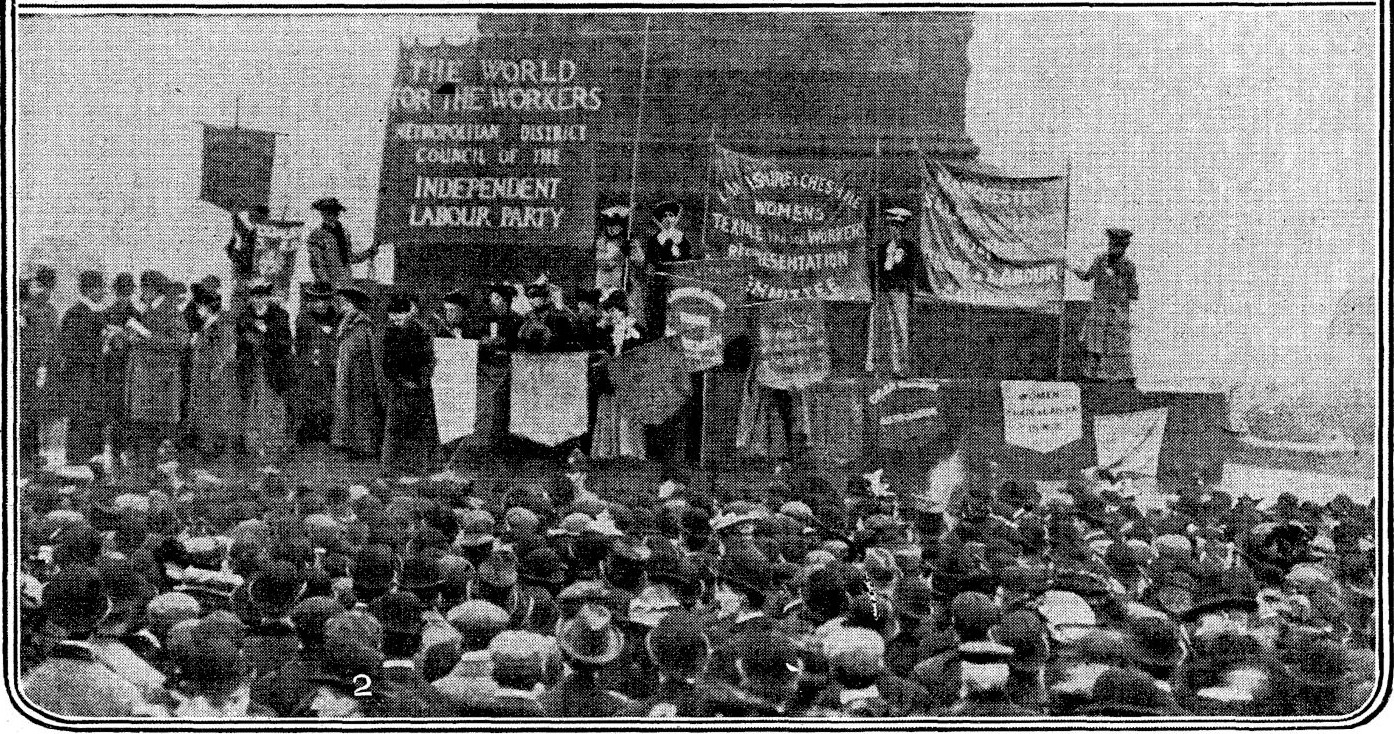
A demonstration in Trafalgar Square

The square has become a social and political focus for visitors and Londoners, developing over its history from "an esplanade peopled with figures of national heroes, into the country's foremost place politique", as historian Rodney Mace has written. Since its construction, it has been a venue for political demonstrations. The great Chartist rally in 1848, a campaign for social reform by the working class began in the square. A ban on political rallies remained in effect until the 1880s, when the emerging Labour movement, particularly the Social Democratic Federation, began holding protests. On 8 February 1886 (also known as "Black Monday"), protesters rallied against unemployment leading to a riot in Pall Mall. A larger riot, "Bloody Sunday", occurred in the square on 13 November 1887.

The Campaign for Nuclear Disarmament's first Aldermaston March, protesting against the Atomic Weapons Establishment (AWE), began in the square in 1958. One of the first significant demonstrations of the modern era was held in the square on 19 September 1961 by the Committee of 100, which included the philosopher Bertrand Russell. The protesters rallied for peace and against war and nuclear weapons. In March 1968 a crowd of 10,000 demonstrated against American involvement in the Vietnam War before marching to the American Embassy in Grosvenor Square.

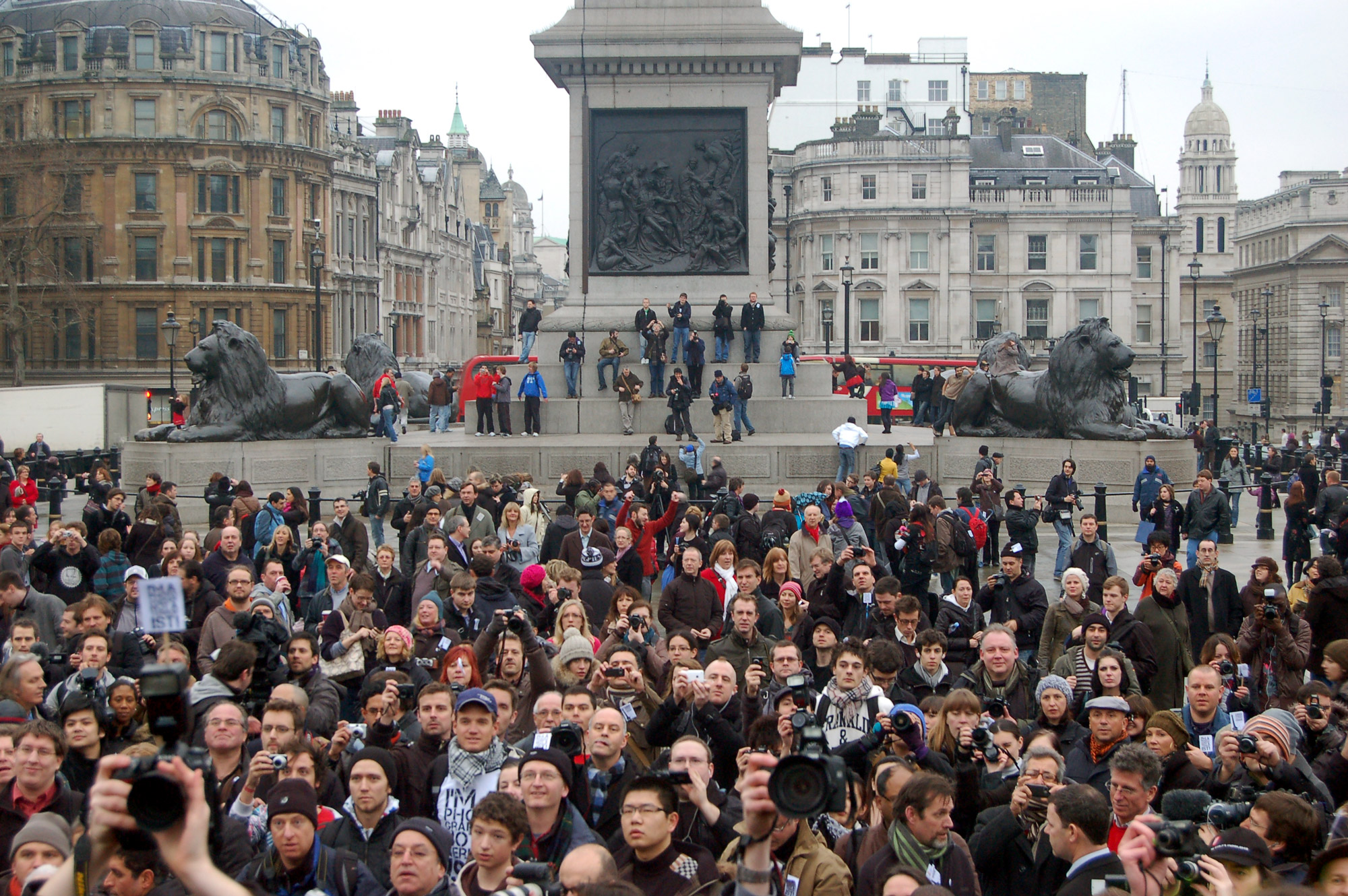
Protesting against harassment of photographers under anti-terrorism law, 23 January 2010

Throughout the 1980s a continuous anti-apartheid protest was held outside South Africa House. In 1990 the Poll Tax Riots began by a demonstration attended by 200,000 people and ultimately caused rioting in the surrounding area. More recently there have been anti-war demonstrations opposing the War in Afghanistan and the Iraq War. A large vigil was held shortly after the terrorist bombings in London on Thursday, 7 July 2005.

In December 2009 participants from the Camp for Climate Action occupied the square for the two weeks during which the United Nations Conference on Climate Change took place in Copenhagen. It was billed as a UK base for direct action on climate change and saw various actions and protests stem from the occupation.

In March 2011 the square was occupied by a crowd protesting against the government budget and proposed budget cuts. During the night the situation turned violent as the escalation by riot police and protesters damaged portions of the square. In November 2015 a vigil against the terrorist attacks in Paris was held. Crowds sang the French national anthem, La Marseillaise, and held banners in support of the city and country.

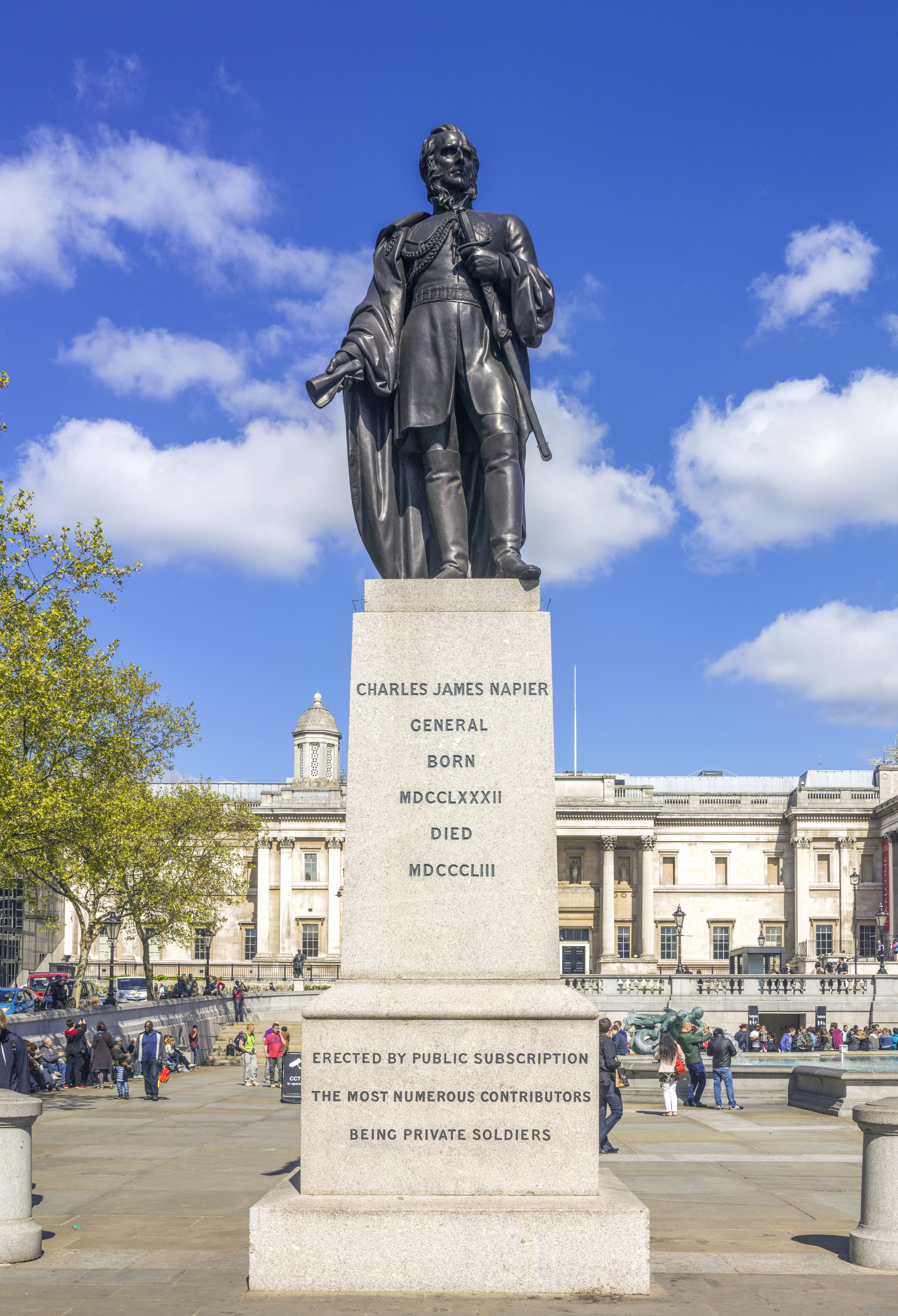
The statue of Charles James Napier in Trafalgar Square, London

The Sea Cadet Corps hold a yearly Battle of Trafalgar victory parade, on the anniversary of the Battle (21 October) running the north of Whitehall, from Horse Guard's Parade to Nelson's Column. The Royal British Legion holds a Silence in the Square event on Armistice Day, 11 November, in remembrance of those who died in war. The event includes music and poetry readings, culminating in a bugler playing the Last Post and a two-minute silence at 11 am.

In February 2019 hundreds of students participated in a protest against climate change as a part of the School strike for Climate campaign. The protest started in the nearby Parliament Square, and as the day went on, the demonstrators moved towards Trafalgar Square.

In July 2020 two members of the protest group Animal Rebellion were arrested on suspicion for criminal damage after releasing red dye into the fountains.

In September 2020 anti-lockdown protests opposed to the imposition of regulations relating to the coronavirus outbreak took place in the square.

A police observation box has been in the Square since 1919, originally a wooden freestanding unit, it was replaced by hollowing out a lampstand at the southeastern corner of the Square into a permanent structure in 1928, but decommissioned in the 1970s.

In 2026, protests organised by The Palestine Coalition in Central London, particularly in Trafalgar Square and Russell Square, garnered media attention when several pro-Palestine protesters were arrested by the Metropolitan Police for chanting 'globalise the intifada.' Met Police had set specific conditions for Palestine-related demonstrations in the square and throughout central London in part due to the 'changed context' of such phrases following the Bondi Beach attack in Australia.

=== Sport ===
In the 21st century Trafalgar Square has been the location for several sporting events and victory parades. In June 2002, 12,000 people gathered to watch England's FIFA World Cup quarter-final against Brazil on large video screens which had been erected for the occasion. The square was used by England on 9 December 2003 to celebrate their victory in the Rugby World Cup, and on 13 September 2005 for England's victory in the Ashes series.

On 6 July 2005 Trafalgar Square hosted the official watch party for London's bid to host the 2012 Summer Olympics at the 117th IOC Session in Singapore, hosted by Katy Hill and Margherita Taylor. A countdown clock was erected in March 2011, although engineering and weather-related faults caused it to stop a day later. In 2007 it hosted the opening ceremonies of the Tour de France and was part of the course for subsequent races.

=== Other uses ===
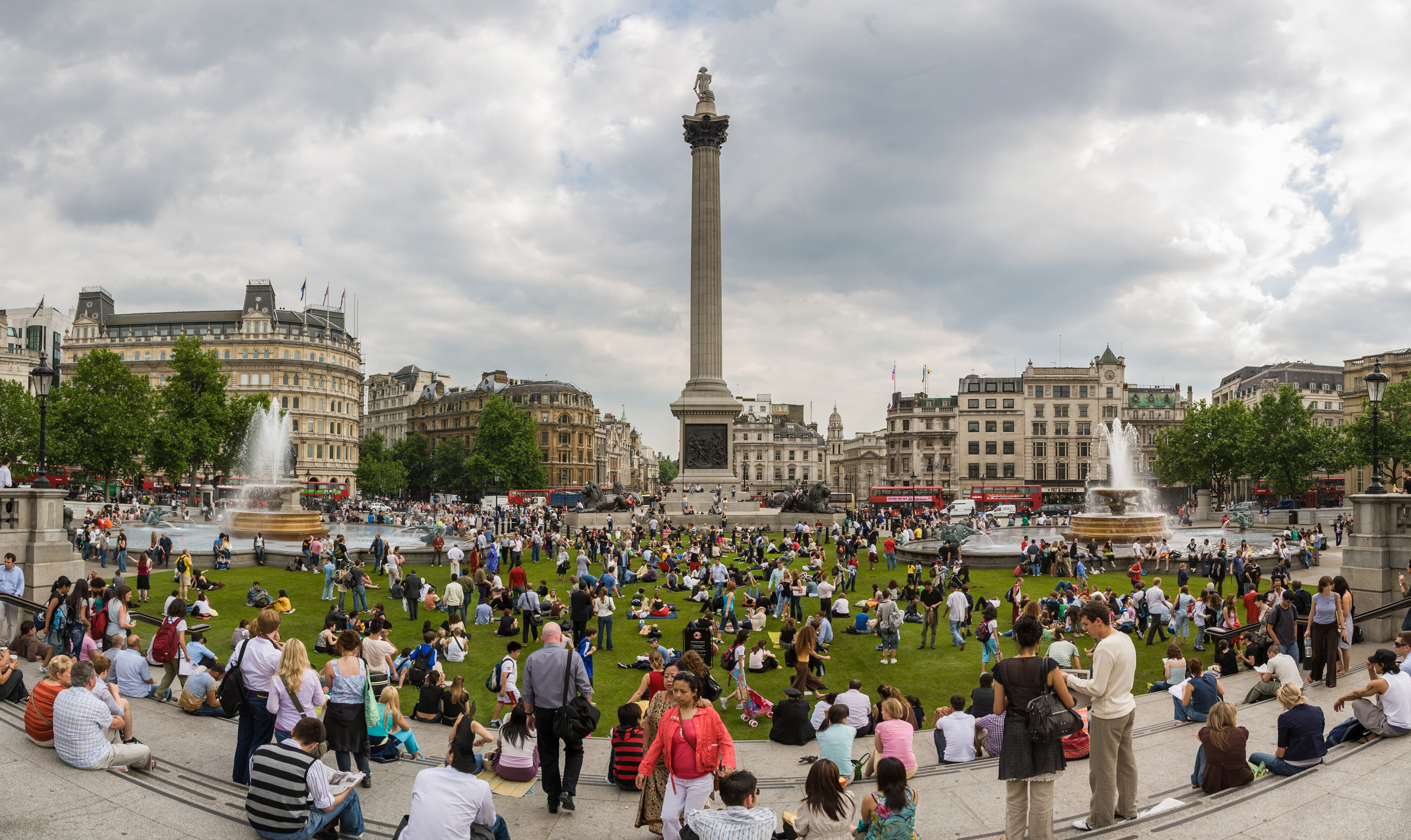
Trafalgar Square temporarily grassed over in May 2007

As an archetypal London location, Trafalgar Square featured in film and television productions during the Swinging London era of the late 1960s, including The Avengers, Casino Royale, Doctor Who and The Ipcress File. It was used for filming several sketches and a cartoon backdrop in the BBC comedy series Monty Python's Flying Circus. In May 2007 the square was grassed over with 2,000 square metres of turf for two days in a campaign by London authorities to promote "green spaces" in the city.

In July 2011, due to building works in Leicester Square, the world premiere of the final film in the Harry Potter series, Harry Potter and the Deathly Hallows – Part 2, was held in Trafalgar Square, with a 0.75-mile (1.21 km) red carpet linking the squares. Fans camped in Trafalgar Square for up to three days before the premiere, despite torrential rain. It was the first film premiere ever to be held there.

== Pigeons ==
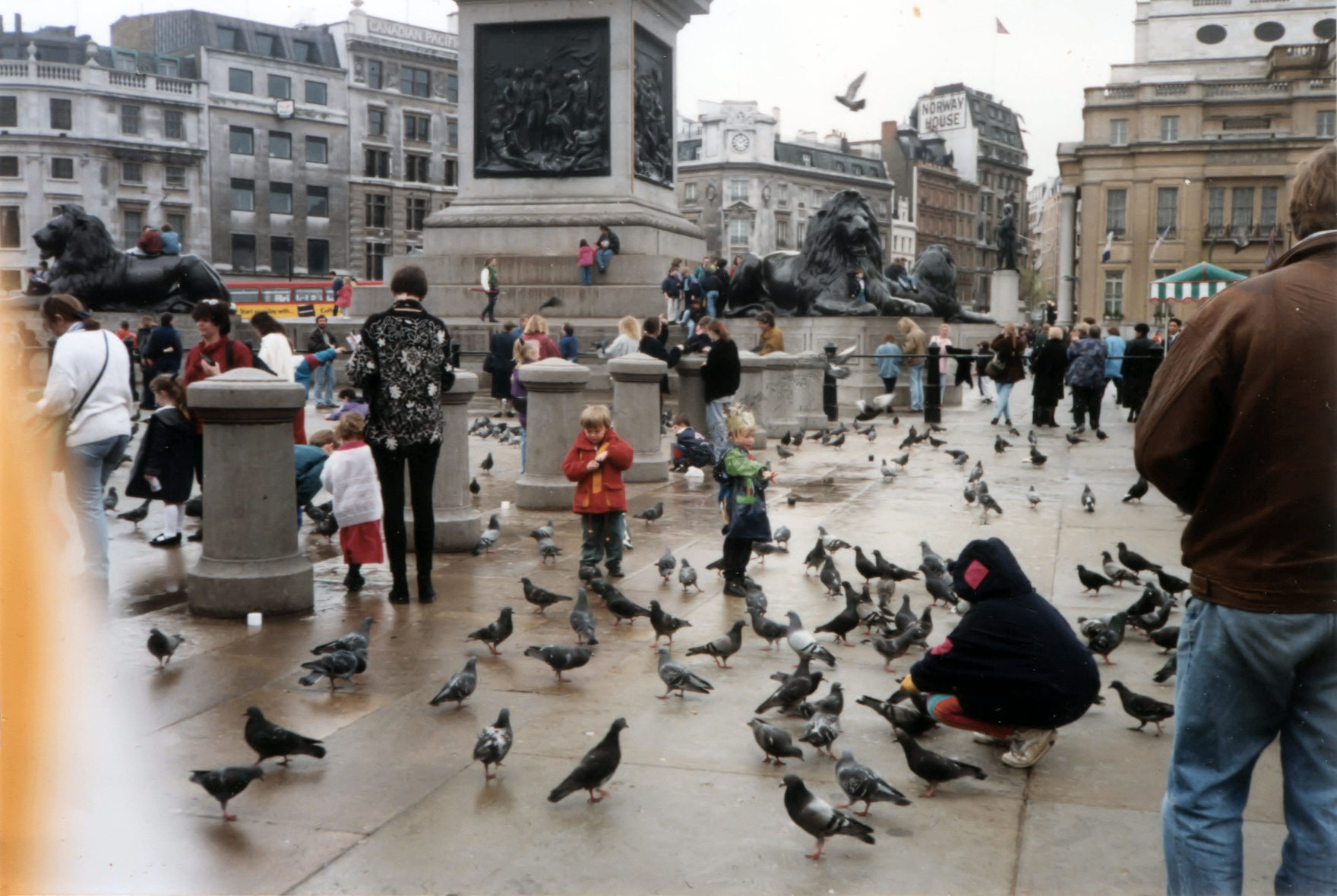
People sitting on lions and feeding pigeons in the square

The square was once famous for feral pigeons and feeding them was a popular activity. Pigeons began flocking to the square before construction was completed and feed sellers became well known in the Victorian era. The desirability of the birds' presence was contentious: their droppings disfigured the stonework and the flock, estimated at its peak to be 35,000, was considered a health hazard.

In February 2001 the sale of bird seed in the square was stopped and other measures were introduced to discourage the pigeons including the use of birds of prey. Supporters continued to feed the birds, but in 2003 Livingstone enacted bylaws to ban feeding them in the square. In September 2007 Westminster City Council passed further bylaws banning feeding birds on the pedestrianised North Terrace and other pavements in the area. Nelson's column was repaired from years of damage from pigeon droppings at a cost of £140,000.

== Cultural references ==
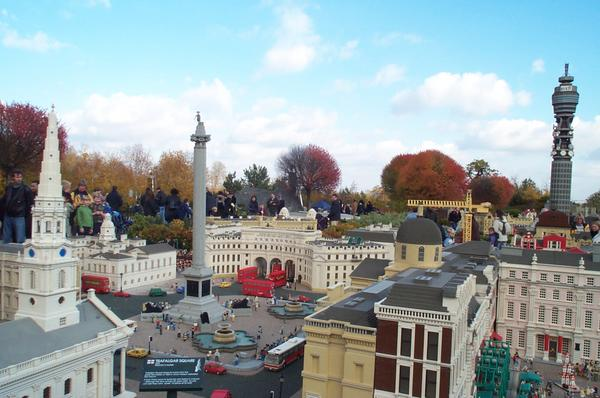
A model of Trafalgar Square in Legoland Windsor

A Lego architecture set based on Trafalgar Square was released in 2019. It contains models of the National Gallery and Nelson's Column alongside miniature lions, fountains and double-decker buses.

Trafalgar Square is one of the squares on the standard British Monopoly Board. It is in the red set alongside the Strand and Fleet Street.

Several scenes in George Orwell's dystopian novel Nineteen Eighty-Four take place in Trafalgar Square, which was renamed "Victory Square" by the story's totalitarian regime and dominated by the giant statue of Big Brother, which replaced Nelson.

== Other Trafalgar Squares ==
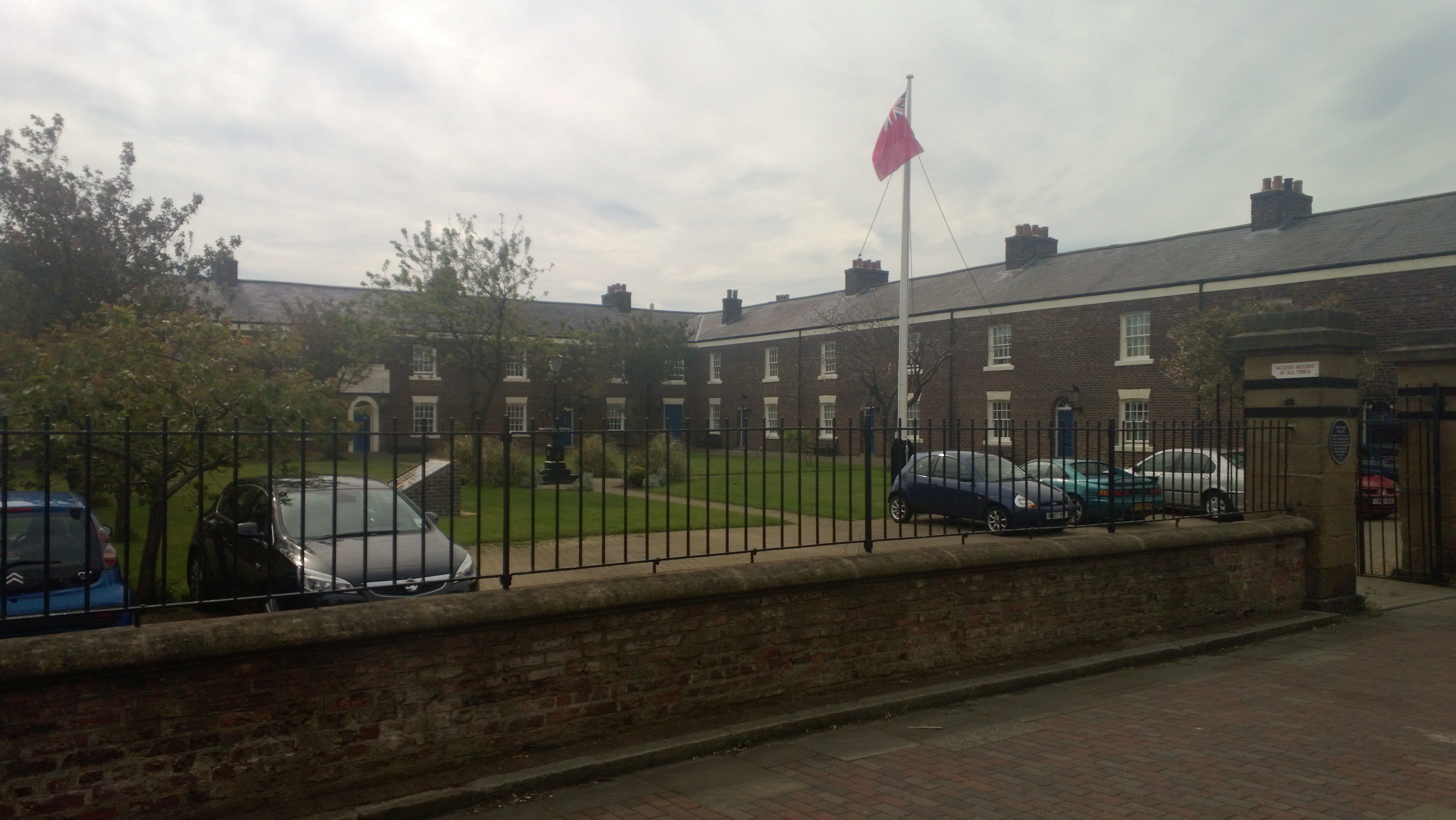
Trafalgar Square in Sunderland: a group of merchant seamen's almshouses dating from 1840

A Trafalgar Square in Stepney is recorded in Lockie's Topography of London, published in 1810.

Trafalgar Square in Scarborough, North Yorkshire gives its name to the Trafalgar Square End at the town's North Marine Road cricket ground.

The square known as Chelsea Square, London SW3 was at one time known as Trafalgar Square and predated the one in Westminster.

National Heroes Square in Bridgetown, Barbados, was named Trafalgar Square in 1813, before its better-known British namesake. It was renamed in 1999 to commemorate national heroes of Barbados.

There is a life scale replica of the square in Bahria Town, Lahore, Pakistan, which is a tourist attraction and centre for local residents.

== See also ==
- Canada House
- Parliament Square
- South Africa House
- Bloody Sunday (1887) – riots focused on Trafalgar Square
- List of public art in Trafalgar Square and the vicinity
