= Jan Frans Boeckstuyns =

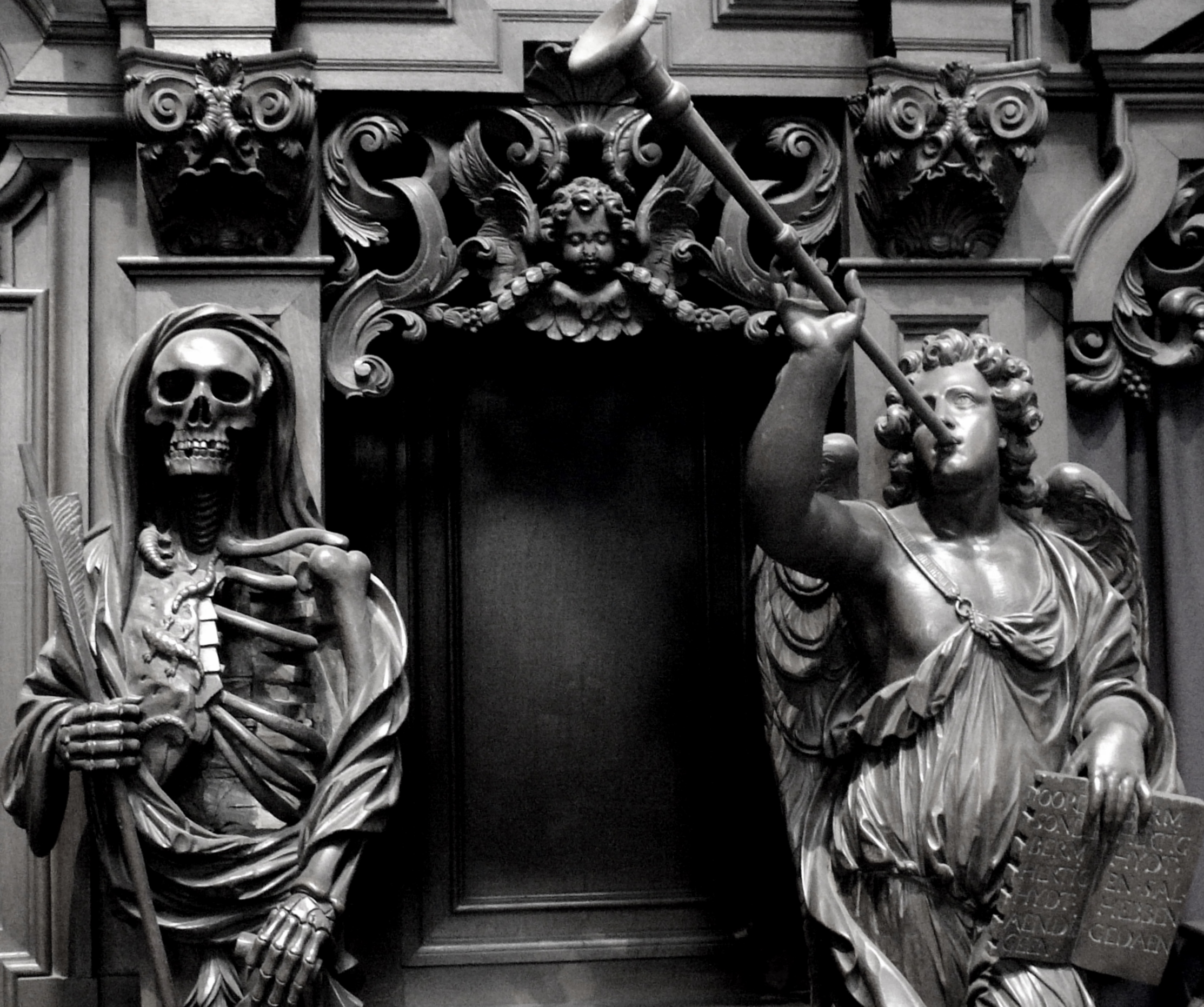
Confessional (detail) in the Basilica of Our Lady of Hanswijk

Jan Frans Boeckstuyns, Boekstuijns or Boecxstuyns (Mechelen, c. 1650 – Mechelen 1734) was a Flemish sculptor and architect who spent most of his active career in his native city Mechelen. He was also active as a manufacturer of gilded leather. While he mainly created church furniture and decorations, he also produced a number of small-scale works, including crucifixes and terracotta figures. He further designed architectural elements of buildings. His works show a transition from the high Baroque towards a more realistic and decorative style closer to the Rococo.

== Life ==
Jan Frans Boeckstuyns was born around 1650 in Mechelen. He has to be distinguished from the sculptor Gillis Frans Boeckstuyns who was baptised in the St. Rumbold's Cathedral in Mechelen on 3 July 1651 and likely was a relative. He studied with the prominent Mechelen sculptor Lucas Faydherbe. Faydherbe was a sculptor from Mechelen who had studied in the workshop of Rubens in Antwerp where he became part of the artists developing the Flemish Baroque style in painting and sculpture. Boeckstuyns became a master in the local Guild of Saint Luke in 1680. He likely continued to work for the workshop of Faydherbe after becoming a master.

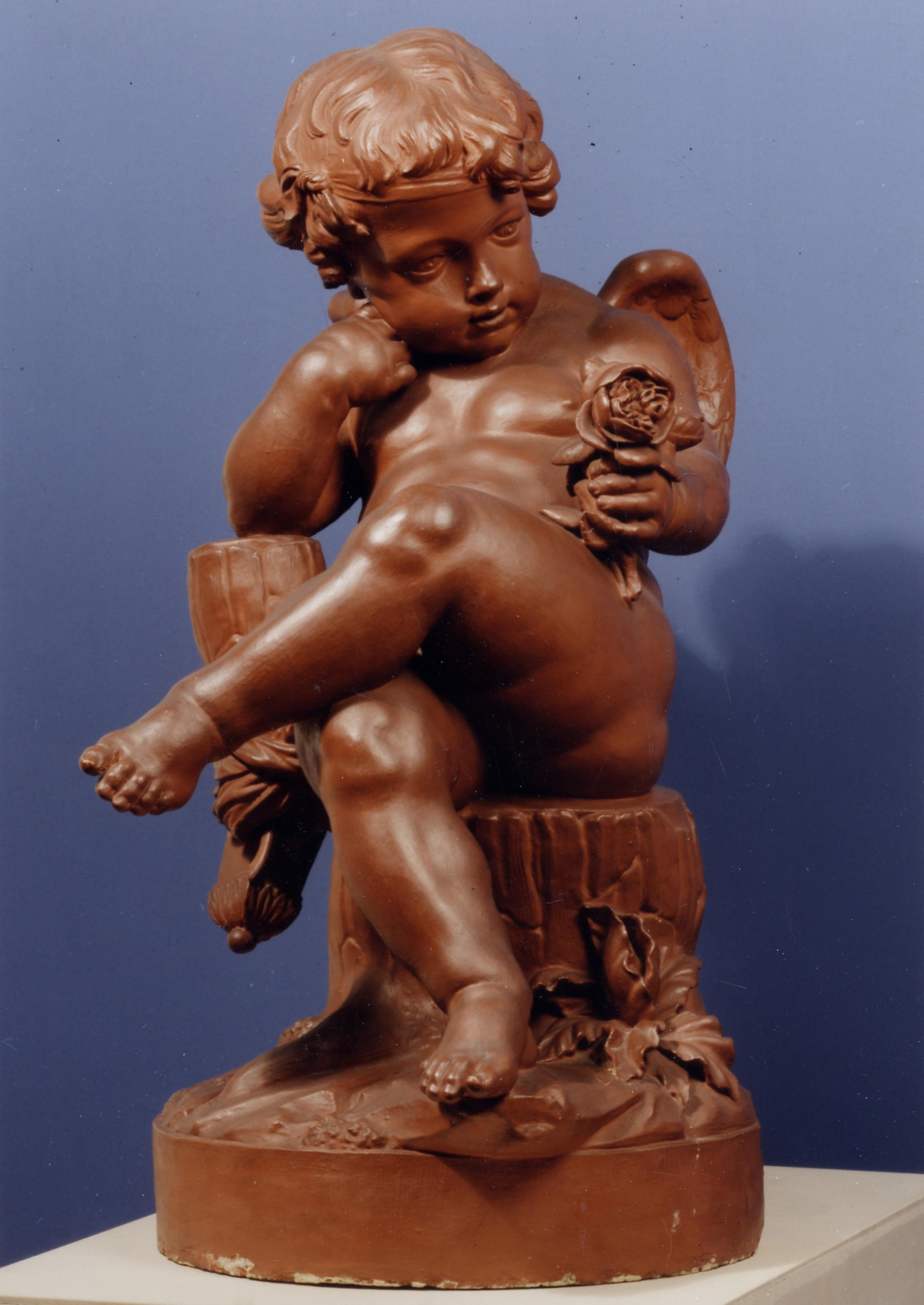
Putto with a rose

He completed various commissions mainly for the decoration of religious buildings and occasionally also for private patrons. His patrons were principally located in Mechelen but he also worked for out-of-town patrons as is shown by his design for a lantern for the St. Peter's Church in Leuven.

He is described by various biographers as a virtuous and deeply religious man who was devoted to his art. He would invite, after the Sunday high mass, a number of indigent children to his workshop and give them free classes in modelling and sculpture. In 1718, the city of Mechelen granted Boeckstuyns several privileges for the commercial use of a new process for the manufacture of gilded leather.

He was the teacher of Theodoor Verhaegen who would become one of the leading sculptors of church architecture in the 17th century Habsburg Netherlands.

He died on 27 June 1734 from a stroke while attending mass in the St. Rumbold's Cathedral. He was buried in the same Cathedral.

== Work ==
Boeckstuyns is best known for the many types of church furniture he created, including pulpits, confessionals, communion benches, altars, tabernacles, etc. He further created small-scale works which were likely made for private clients. An example of the latter are a crucifix in palm wood (Museum Hof van Busleyden, Mechelen) and a terracotta putto holding a rose (Museum Hof van Busleyden) and a Putto with bird's nest (Royal Museums of Fine Arts of Belgium, Brussels), which is a good example of High Baroque sculpture.

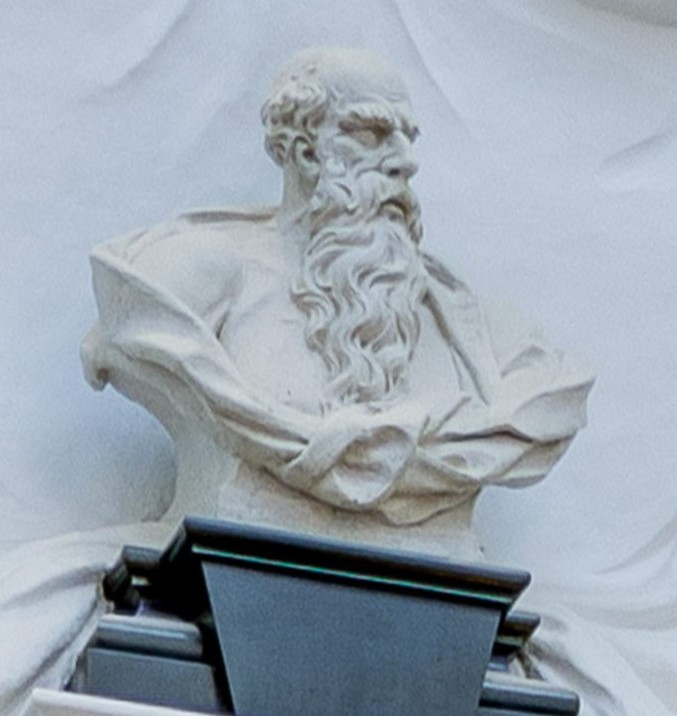
Bust of St Jerome, Basilica of Our Lady of Hanswijk

In 1690, Jan Frans Boeckstuyns worked with Mechelen sculptors Frans Langhemans and Laurens van der Meulen on the realization of the high altar of the Church of Our Lady-across-the-Dyle (Onze-Lieve-Vrouw over de Dijlekerk) in Mechelen.

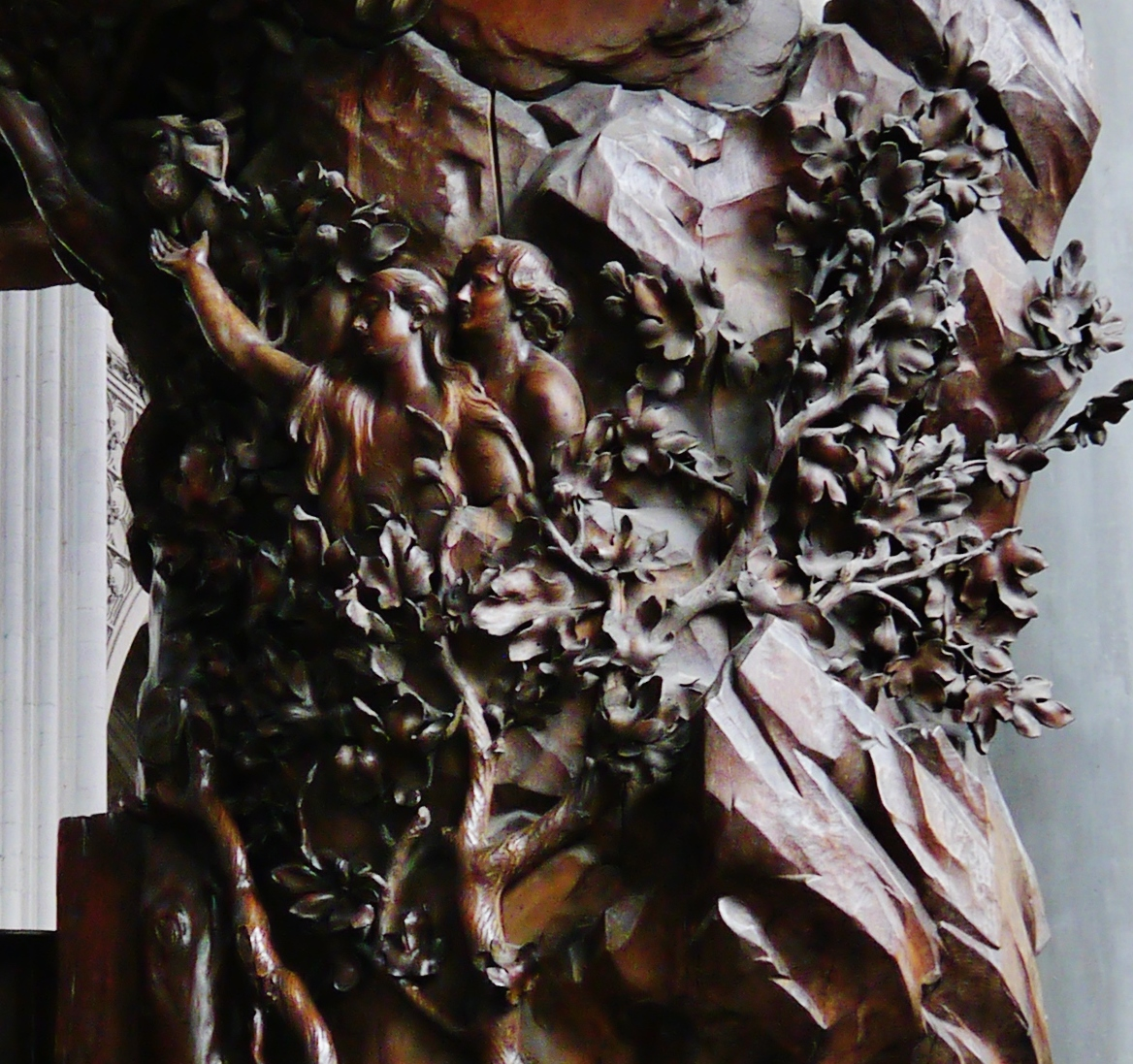
Adam and Eve, pulpit in St. Rumbold's Cathedral

Boeckstuyns' works in the Saint Alexius and Catharina Church (the Grand Beguinage Church) in Mechelen include a portal at the northern entrance dedicated to Saint Ursula (1700), a gable wall, a wooden confessional, a communion bank and the head of God in the façade of the church.

Boeckstuyns has been credited with the creation of the wooden pulpit in the St. Rumbold's Cathedral. This work has also been attributed to Michiel van der Voort the Elder. It is believed that the two artists collaborated on this work with the help of assistants including Theodoor Verhaegen, a pupil of Boeckstuyns. Boeckstuyns provided the original design which was then modified by van der Voort. The pulpit was conceived for the rather small Church of Our Lady of Leliendaal, in Mechelen, which was designed by Boeckstuyns' master Lucas Faydherbe . The pulpit is a representative of the naturalistic pulpits that were popular in the Habsburg Netherlands in the Late High Baroque. They are conceived as a single large sculpture in which the constructive form disappears. The lower part of the composition simulates a rock, in the hollow of which is the main subject: Saint Norbert, who after being struck by lightning, has been knocked off his horse. Above the rock are two scenes, the Calvary and the Fall of Man. On the right side of the preacher is Jesus as the Savior on the cross between the Blessed Virgin and St. John. Weeping humanity sits at the feet of the cross and raises its pleading eyes to the crucifix. On the left side of the staircase is represented in bas-relief an episode from Genesis. Eve, seduced by the serpent, which crawls on the stony steps of the staircase, presents the apple to Adam. The crown of the tree of Good and Evil forms the sounding board. The general conception of the pulpit is ingenious and original. The figures which decorate it would have produced an excellent effect in the smaller cloister church for which they were destined. When the pulpit was acquired for the St. Rumbold's Cathedral in 1809, the sculptor Jan Frans van Geel was asked to adapt it to one of the rounded pillars of the cathedral. The wooden tabernacle for the altar in the chapel of the Holy Sacrament in the St. Rumbold's Cathedral is thought to have been made by Boeckstuyns in 1704.

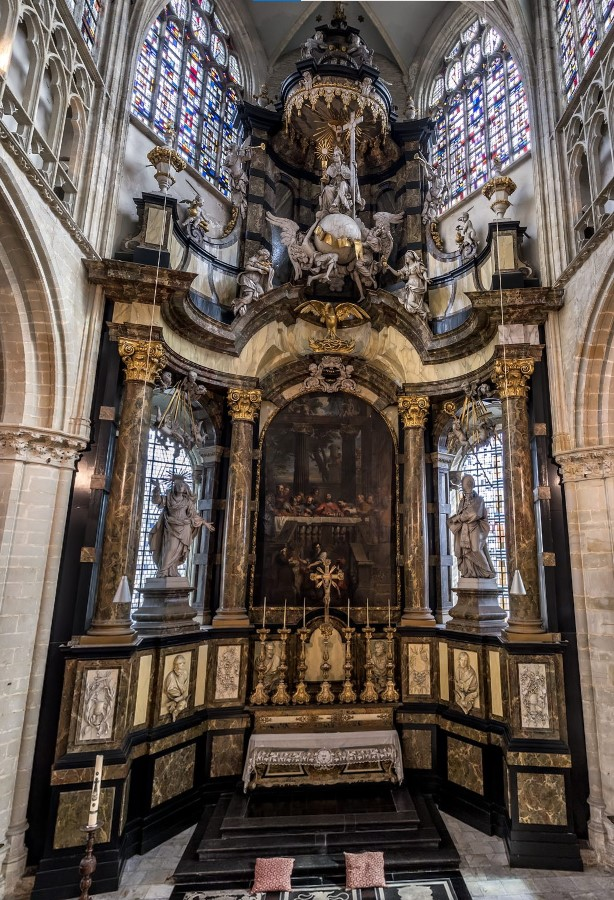
High Altar of the Onze-Lieve-Vrouw-over-de-Dijlekerk

In the Basilica of Our Lady of Hanswijk in Mechelen, Boeckstuyns created three wooden confessionals with allegorical figures (1690) which testify to his rich imagination. He devised a wide variety of facial expressions in the figures included in the confessionals, from the sinner begrudgingly folding his hands as a sign of repentance to the pensive angel holding Veronica's cloth. These confessionals, in addition to having a clear structure as they are built into the wall show a tendency toward realistic rendering. Further, in their decorative treatment with the busily worked consoles, shields, and shells, they indicate a development in the direction of the rococo. He also made for the same church a wooden roof gable (1712) for an altar previously made by Lucas Faydherbe. The busts of the Latin church fathers crown the four porticoes of the same church. Those of Saint Ambrose and Saint Augustine are by Lucas Faydherbe and those of Saint Jerome and Saint Gregory (both 1729) are by Boeckstuyns.

Boeckstuyns also drew the plan for a facade wall, decorated with a figure of Saint Sebastian, for the headquarters of the Archers' Guild of Mechelen. The design shows his skill as an architect. He also made a model for the skylight of the transept of the St. Peter's Church in Leuven.
