= Laurens van der Meulen =

Flemish sculptor, painter and frame-maker

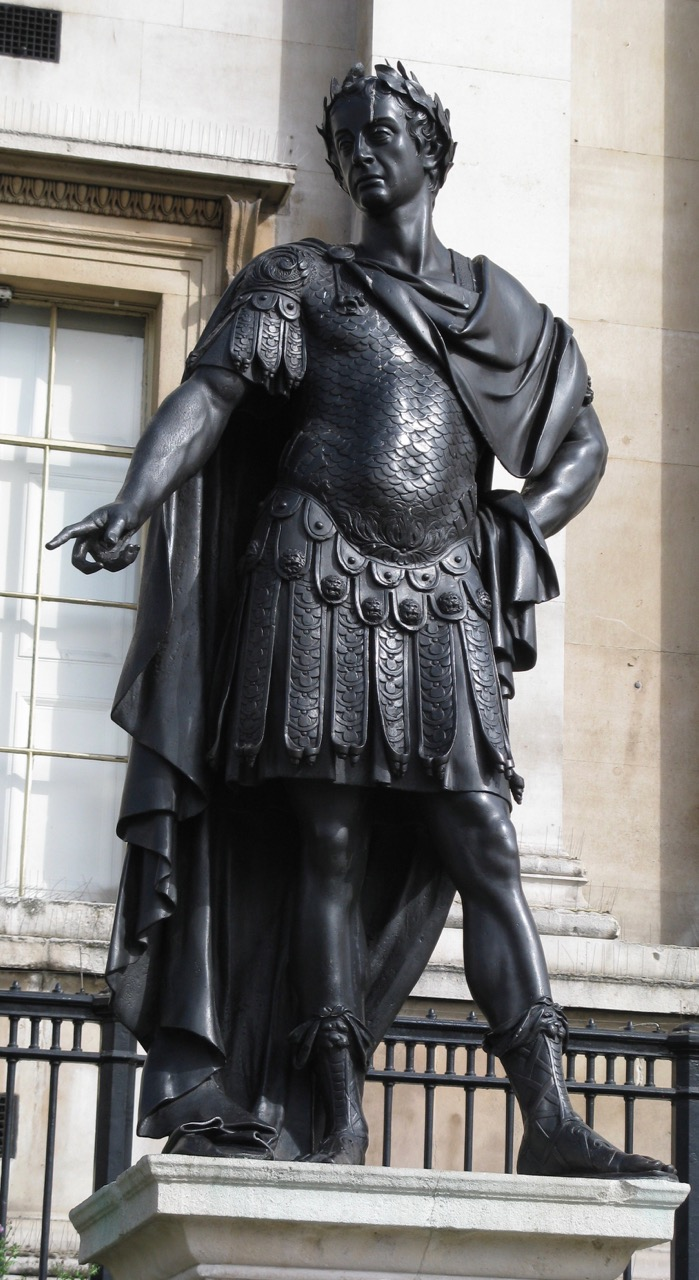
Statue of James II, Trafalgar Square

Laurens van der Meulen, also Laureys or Laurent van der Meulen, known in England as Laurence Vander Meulen (1643–1719), was a Flemish sculptor, painter and frame-maker who, after training in his native Mechelen, worked for some time in England. He is best known there for having created, together with the Flemish sculptor Peter van Dievoet, while working in the workshop of Grinling Gibbons, the statue of King James II now in Trafalgar Square. He is also known for his wood carvings of frames and medallions.

== Life ==
Vander Meulen was born in 1643 in Mechelen, the son of Pieter, originally from Erondegem, and Elisabeth Schuermans from Mechelen. At the time Mechelen was one of the prime centres of sculpture making in Flanders, next only to Antwerp. He started training as a sculptor in the workshop of Pieter van der Stock and was registered in the Mechelen Guild of Saint Luke on 10 November 1665. Pieter van der Stock had himself started his traineeship only five years earlier under Coenraet van Kerckhoven.

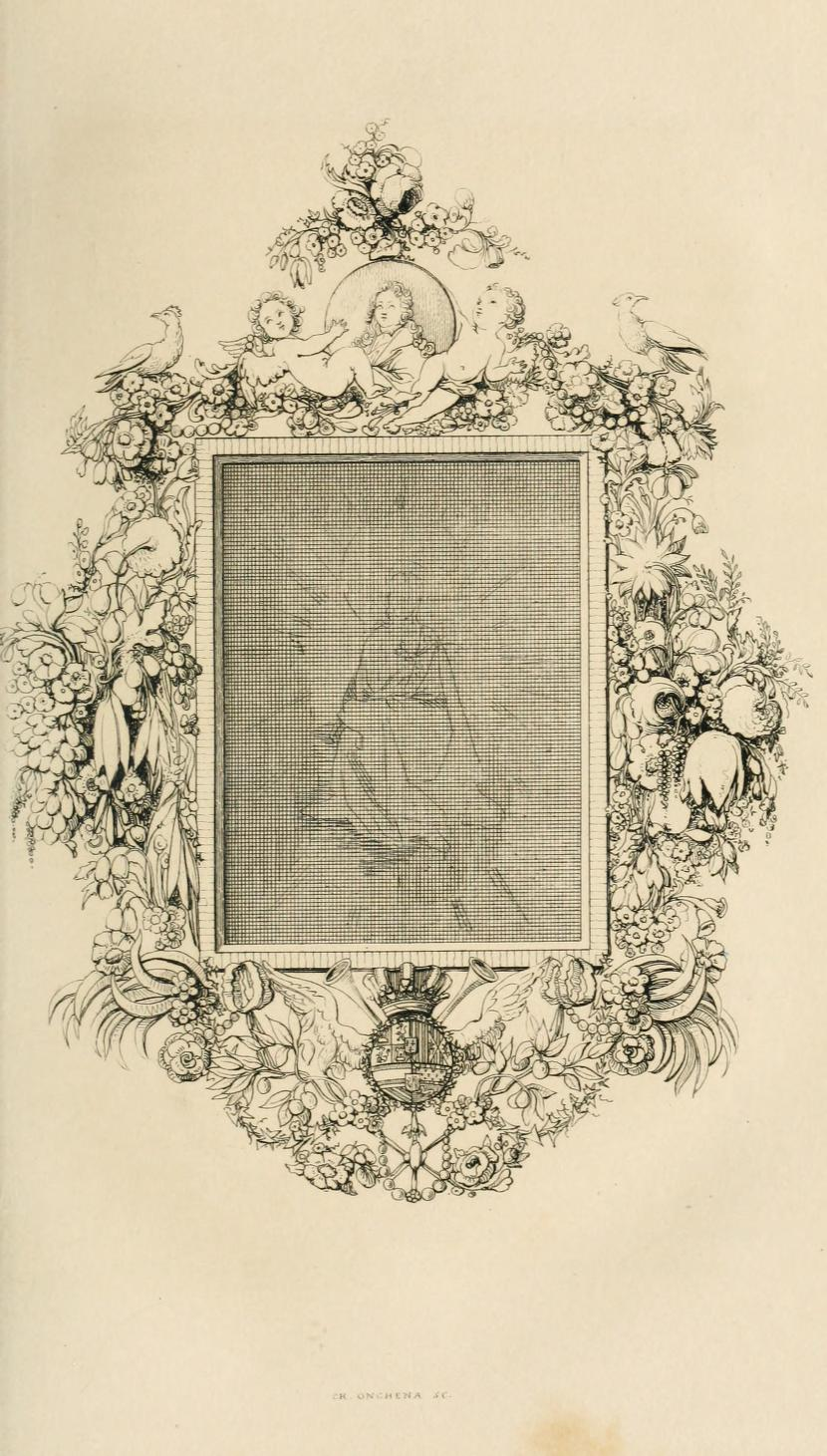
Engraving of the Mirror frame with portrait of Philip V of Spain

Vander Meulentravelled to England in 1675 where he joined the London workshop of the (Rotterdam-born) English sculptor Grinling Gibbons. Gibbons was mainly known as a sculptor for his fine carvings of floral motifs. Other experienced Flemish sculptors such as Arnold Quellin (the son of Artus Quellinus II), John Nost, Anthony Verhuke and Peter van Dievoet also worked in Gibbon's London workshop as "servants", i.e., collaborators. As these Flemish artists were not trainees, they were never entered in the Draper's records. In a document dated 1679 van der Meulen, Quellin and Verhuke are referred to as servants of Gibbons.

In the Gibbons workshop he worked on various commissions but the contributions of the various artists active in the workshop are not always identifiable. He is known to have collaborated with Peter van Dievoet on the creation of the statue of King James II during his stay in the workshop of Grinling Gibbons.

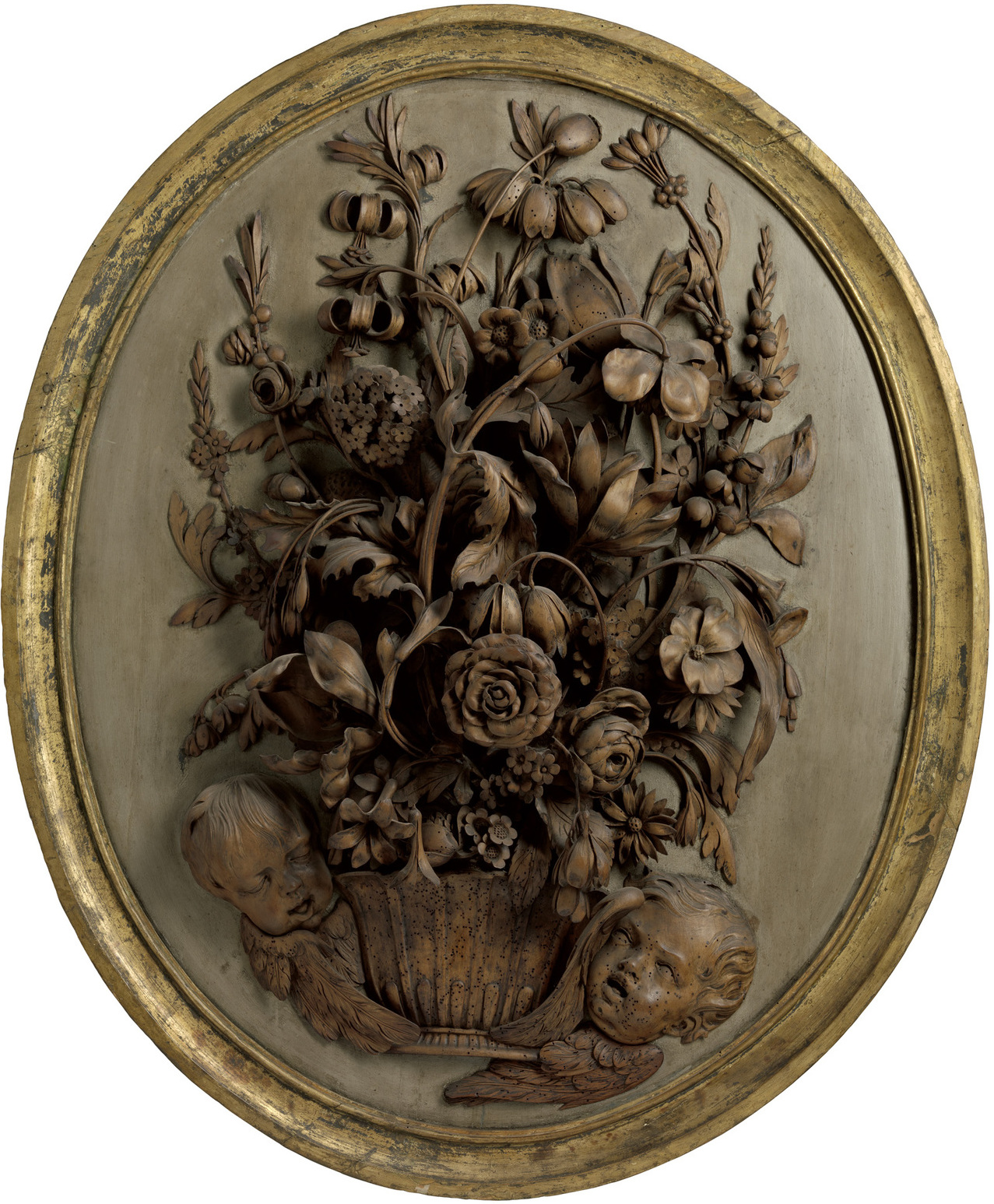
Medallion with vanitas motifs

Van der Meulen returned in 1687 to his home town and was admitted as a master sculptor of the Mechelen Guild of Saint Luke in 1689. He became a dean of the Guild in 1691. On 26 August 1691 (or possibly 31 January 1704) he married Cornelia Theresia de Croes. His wife's sister Joanna Maria was married to the sculptor Jan Lucas Faydherbe, son of the prominent Mechelen sculptor Lucas Faydherbe. Van der Meulen had one child. It is recorded that he painted a portrait of his daughter. He died at Mechelen.

He must have enjoyed quite a high reputation as Philip V, the King of Spain, is believed to have ordered a mirror frame representing the union of Spain and France from him. This work was ultimately not delivered to the King as the Southern Netherlands ultimately passed from Spanish to Austrian control as a result of the War of the Spanish Succession, which ended with the Peace of Utrecht.

He died in Mechelen on 26 October 1719 and was buried in the St. Rumbold's Cathedral.

== Work ==
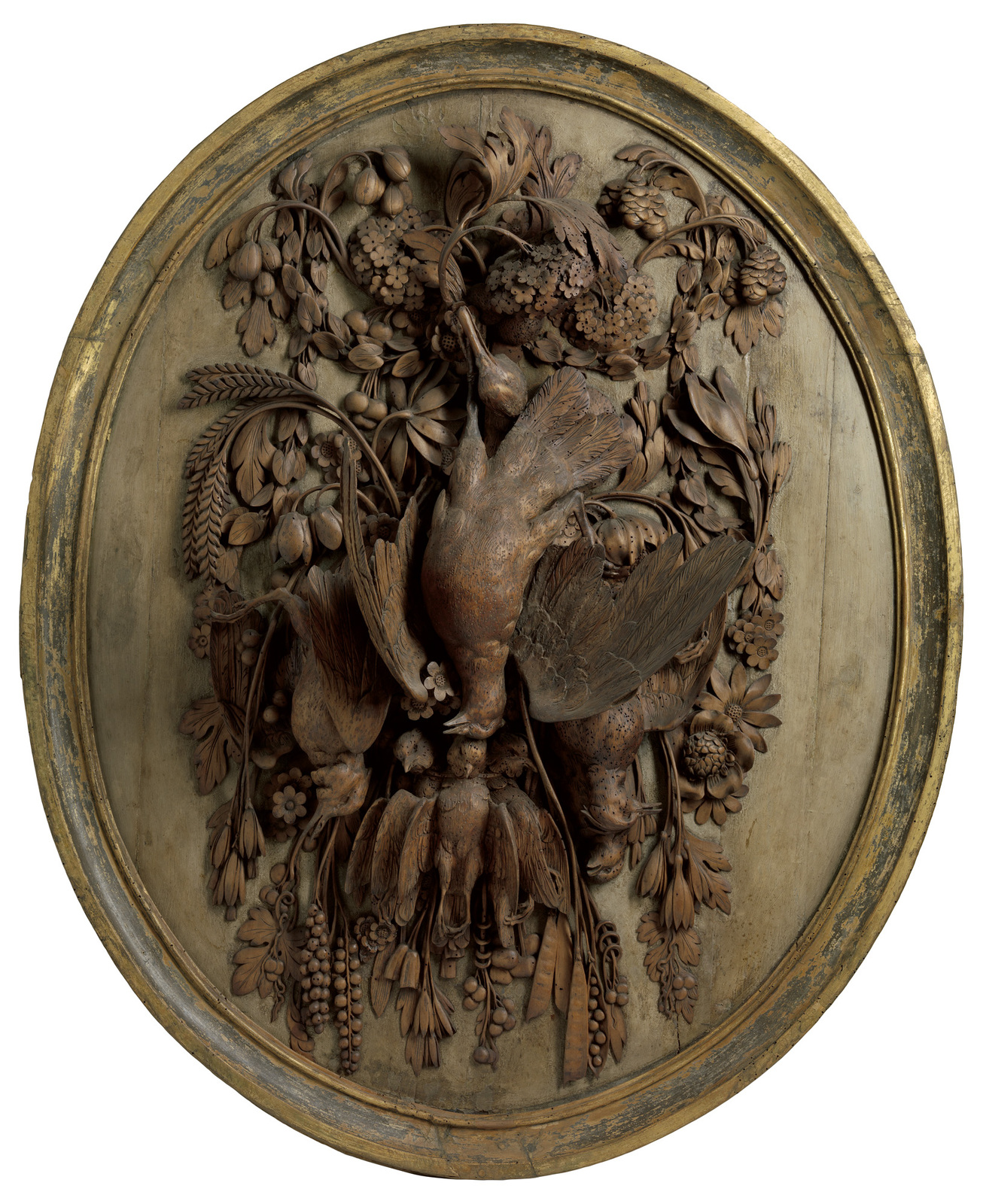
Medaillon with hunting symbols

He sculpted statues and was active as a painter, but was mainly a creator of decorative sculptures such as picture and mirror frames, allegorical medallions, tables, etc. He decorated many churches and houses with his ornaments composed of garlands of finely chiseled flowers similar to the fine carvings of a goldsmith. In addition, he created religious statues of saints and the Virgin and some busts, as is attested by listings in various catalogues. He carved four bas-reliefs representing the four elements which were intended as chimney decorations.

He created in his decorative works complicated trophies, deeply carved and superimposed, with motifs of foliage, flowers, birds and crustaceans sometimes accompanied by putti. His execution of the human figure did not match the perfection of the still-life elements in these works. Some of his wood works were so subtly carved that the foliage and branches on the edges moved and quivered at the slightest movement.

He was paid to make the foliage decorations on the columns of the main altar of the Church of Our Lady across the river Dijle in Mechelen. The Mechelen sculptors Frans Langhemans and Jan Frans Boeckstuyns also worked on this altar.
