= Basilica of Our Lady of Hanswijk =

Belgian religious building

Coordinates: 51°1′20″N 4°29′7″E

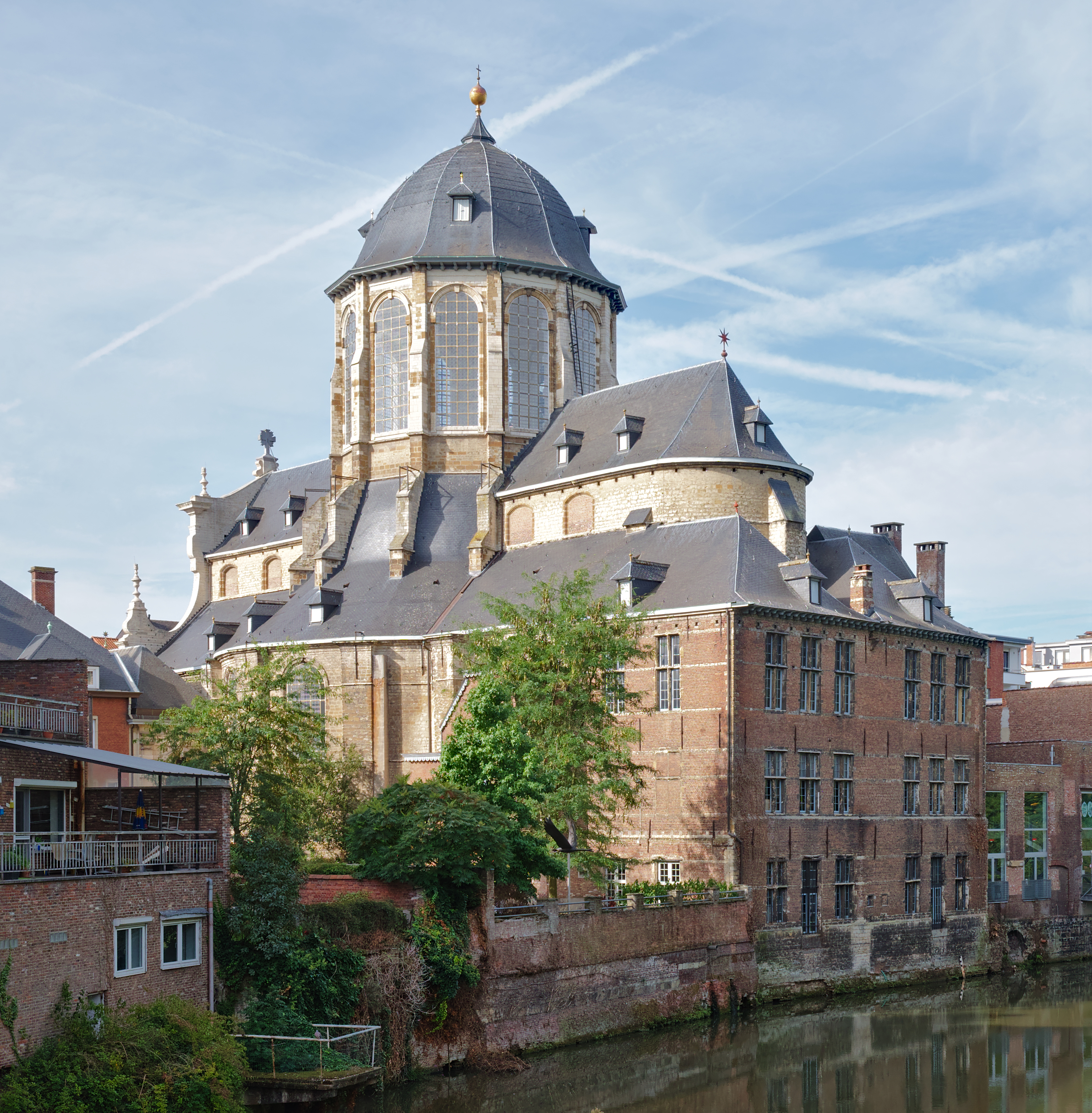
Basilica of Our Lady of Hanswijk and the Dyle river

The Basilica of Our Lady of Hanswijk (Dutch: Onze-Lieve-Vrouw van Hanswijkis) is a Roman Catholic basilica in Mechelen, Belgium. The basilica is a famous place of pilgrimage in Belgium, the statue was crowned on 30 July 1876 by Cardinal Deschamps by request of Pope Pius IX.

== Description ==
The church was built after a miracle of Our Lady on a local ship, in this part called "Hanswijck". The historic statue is kept inside the church for veneration. The facade in Italian style and cupola were designed by Lucas Faydherbe. The Baroque interior is famous for its sculptures and carvings, in the ceiling impressive work of Faydherbe is executed in stucco. The pulpit, sculpted by Theodore Verhaegen was paid by Alexander Rubens, Lord of Vremdyck. The crypt and the basilica itself contain several depictions of Saint Rumbold. Every year the annual procession of Hanswijk ends here.

In this basilica Petrus Joseph Triest was active as vicar between 1791 and 1797. In 2016, Geert Bourgeois opened the basilica, after 2 years of restorations.

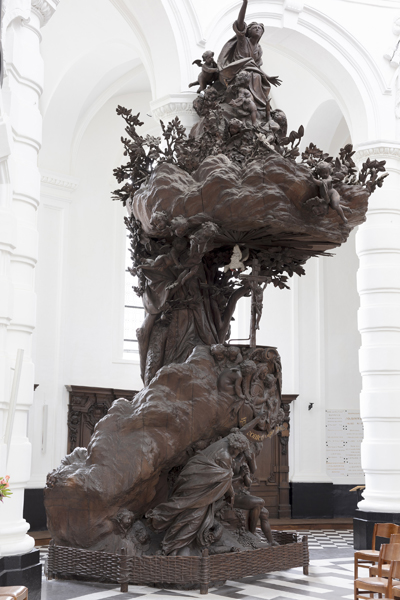
Pulpit (Theodoor Verhaegen)

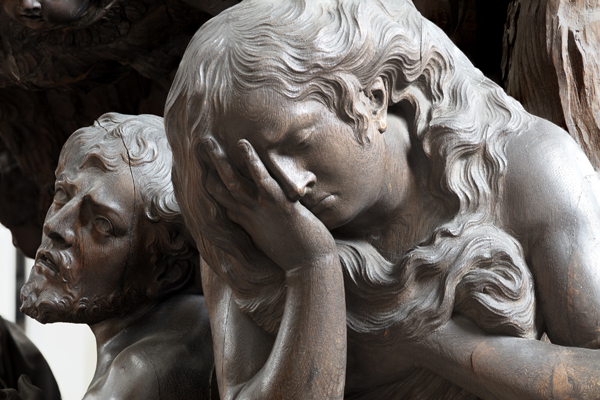
Pulpit

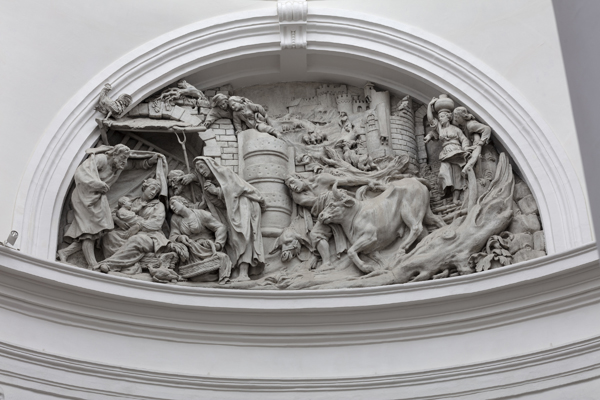
Adoration of the sheperds (Lucas Faydherbe)

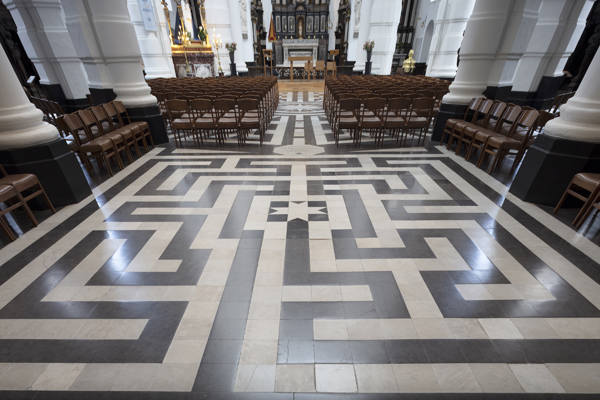
Labyrinth floor

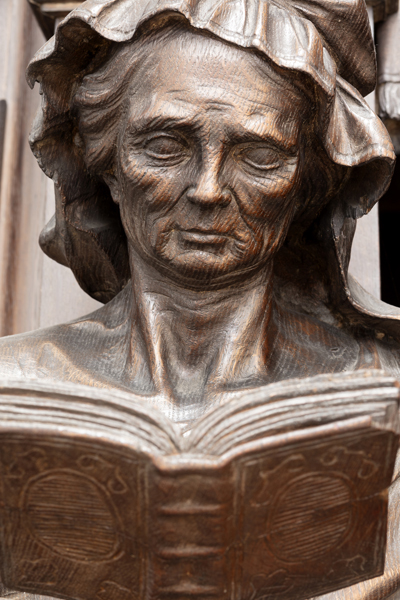
Confessional (detail)

== See also ==
- List of Catholic churches in Belgium
