= Bust of Hercules =

C. 1618 sculpture by Lucas Faydherbe

- French: Buste d'Hercule, Dutch: Buste van Hercules
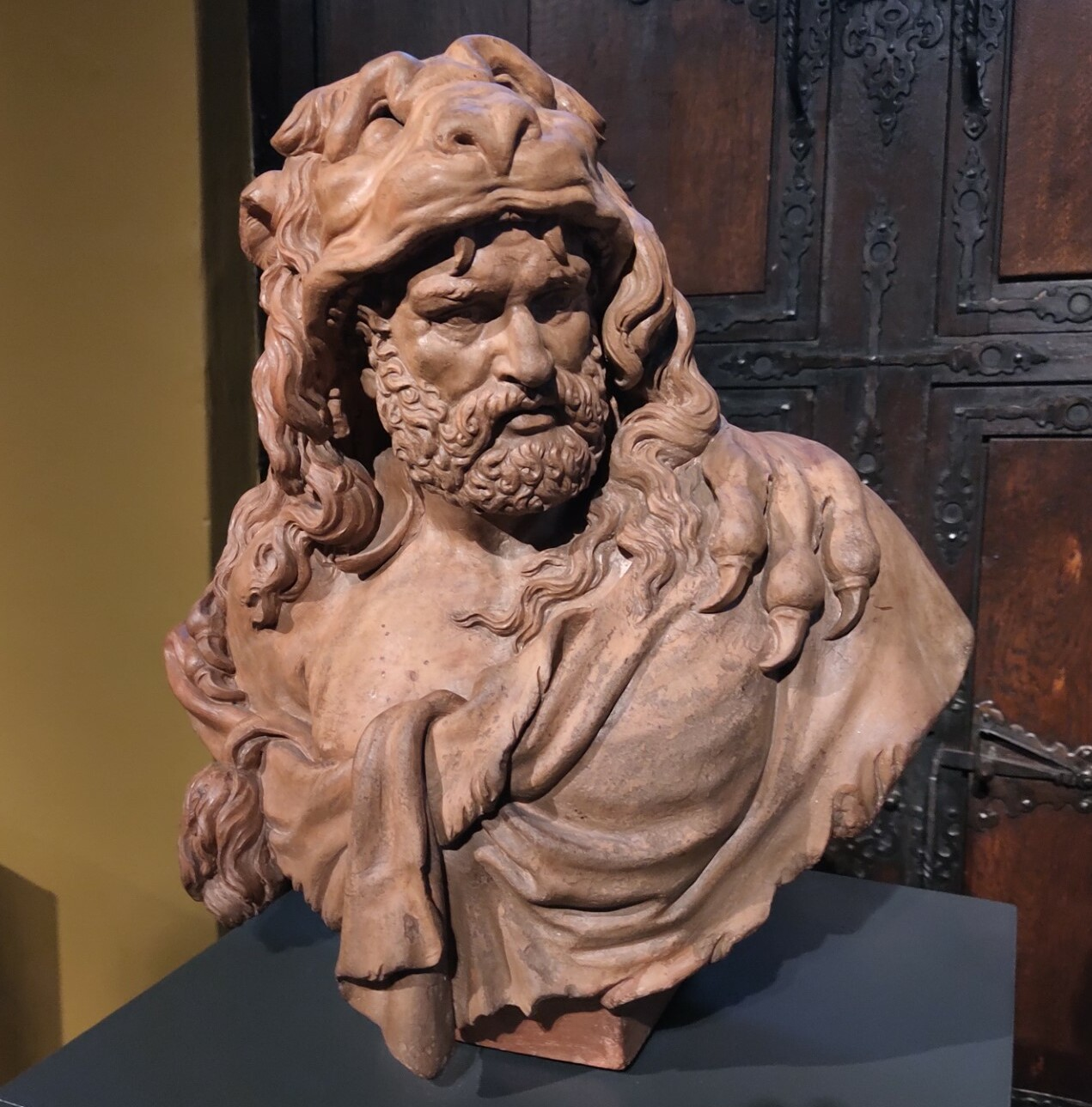
- Bust of Hercules, collection King Baudouin Foundation (on loan at Rubenshuis)
- Artist: Lucas Faydherbe
- Year: ca. 1617-1619
- Medium: Terracotta sculpture
- Subject: Hercules
- Location: Rubenshuis, Antwerpen
- Owner: King Baudouin Foundation
- Accession: inv. 50 (KBS)
- Website: http://vanherck.collectionkbf.be/bust-hercules?position=3&list=bDBuh079YgIhPOmVOgXccNXW_tweSUtDCcvI6zNEzRw

Bust of Hercules is a terracotta sculpture by Lucas Faydherbe (1617–1619) and makes part of the Van Herck Collection acquired by the King Baudouin Foundation in 1966.

== Context ==
Lucas Faydherbe was a sculptor from Mechelen and a pupil of Baroque painter Peter Paul Rubens. The work represents the ancient hero Hercules and is part of a series of terracotta busts that represent mythological themes and figures, making a unique part of Faydherbe's oeuvre. He is depicted wearing a lion's skin.

The work makes part of the collection King Baudouin Foundation and is on view at the Rubenshuis (Antwerp).
