= Rumbold of Mechlin =

Irish or Scottish Christian missionary and martyr

Saint Rumbold
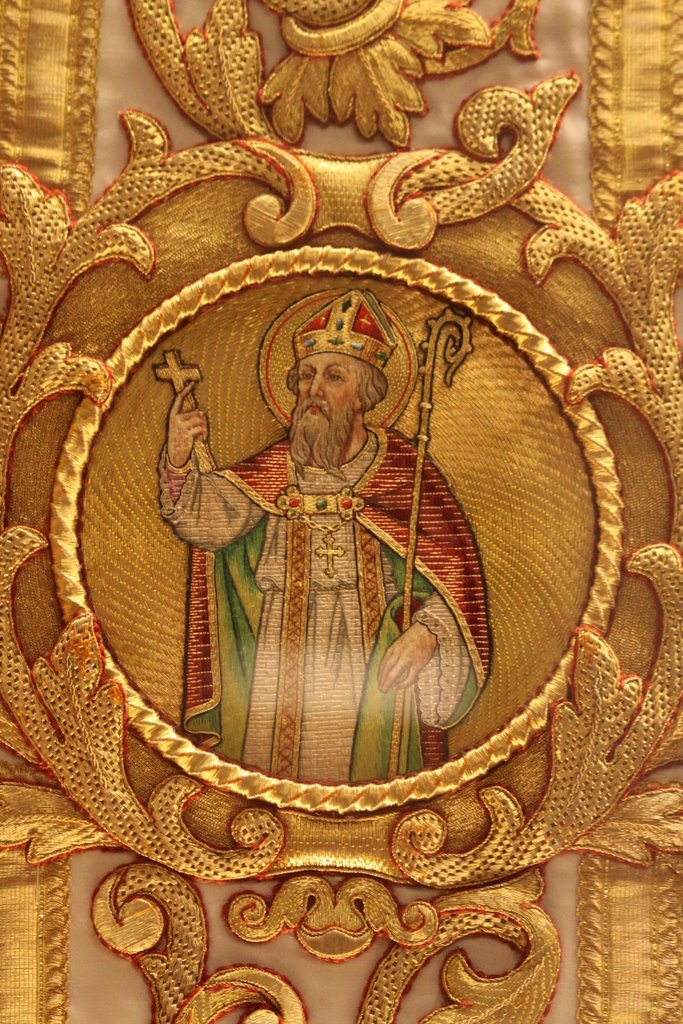
- Saint Rumbold on a chasuble in the Basilica of Our Lady of Hanswijk, Mechelen

Missionary
- Born: possibly Ireland or Scotland
- Died: 6th, 7th or 8th century (see text); Mechelen
- Venerated in: Catholic Church; Eastern Orthodox Church
- Major shrine: St Rumbold's Cathedral in Mechelen
- Feast: 24 June
- Attributes: Depicted as a bishop or a bearded man with a hoe lying under his feet. He may also be shown murdered near a coffer of money.
- Patronage: Mechelen and Humbeek

Saint Rumbold (or Rumold, Romuold; Dutch: Rombout; French: Rombaut; Latin: Rum(w)oldus, Rumwaldus, Rumboldus, Rumbaldus; many variants overall) was an Irish or Scottish Christian missionary, although his true nationality is not known for certain. He was martyred near Mechelen by two men, whom he had denounced for their evil ways.

Saint Rumbold's feast day is celebrated by the Roman Catholic Church, and Western Rite Orthodox Churches, on 24 June; and it is celebrated in Ireland on 3 July. He is the patron saint of Mechelen, where St. Rumbold's Cathedral possesses an elaborate golden shrine on its high altar, containing relics attributed to the saint. According to local lore, his remains are buried in the cathedral. Twenty-five paintings in the choir illustrate his life.

== Life and legend ==
There are no contemporary historical records on the life of Rumbold and all stories about his life are legendary. According to legend, he was consecrated a regionary bishop at Rome. Aodh Buidhe Mac an Bhaird (c. 1590–1635) argued that Rumbold was born in Ireland. He is said to have been a Bishop of Dublin, the son of a Scottish king, and the brother of Saint Himelin. He would have worked under St. Willibrord in the Netherlands and Brabant, and also have been a close companion of the hermit St. Gummarus, and of the preacher monk Fredegand van Deurne, who, according to one tradition, maintained contact with St. Foillan (who was murdered in the Sonian Forest around 665).

St. Rumbold's biography, written around 1100 AD by Theodoricus, prior of Sint-Truiden Abbey, identified 775 as the year of the saint's death. The surrounding areas of Mechelen had in reality been Christianized much earlier. In 2004 a state-of-the-art examination of the relics traditionally claimed to be St. Rumbold's showed a death date between 580 and 655.

== St. Rumwold of Buckingham ==
There has been some historical confusion between Rumbold of Mechelen and the infant Saint Rumwold of Buckingham, who died in 662 AD at the age of 3 days. The latter is referred to as Romwold, Rumwald, Runwald, Rumbald, or Rumbold. A compilation of three saints' lives translated by Rosalind Love mentioned that in 15th-century records in Salisbury, an unknown author 'corrected' the attribution as "martyr" (possibly the Rumbold murdered in Mechelen) by annotating "confessor" (as Rumwold was not a martyr). Also, the original dedication of churches to a St. Rumbold in Northern England appears uncertain.

== Gallery ==
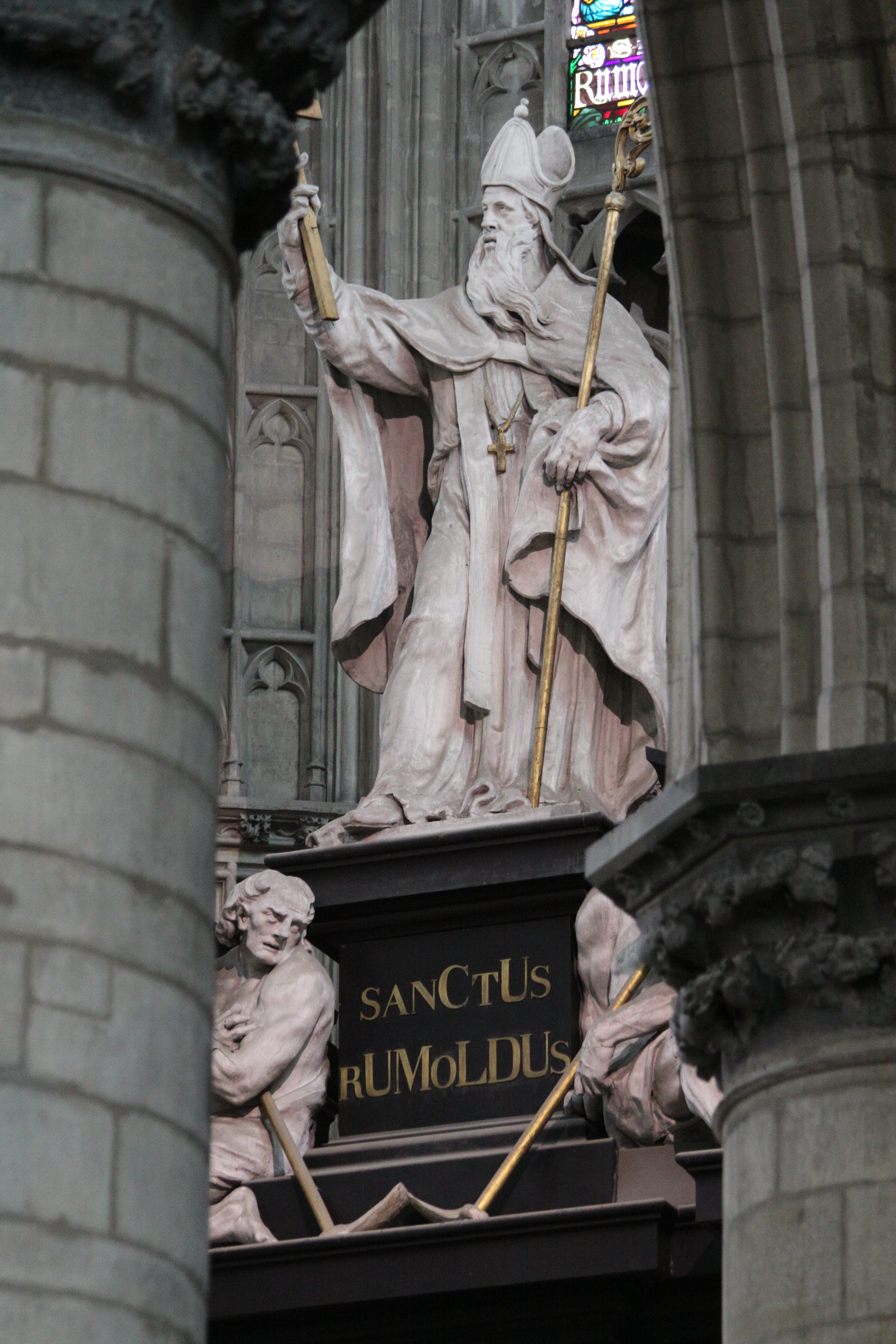
St. Rumbold's statue in St. Rumbold's Cathedral, Mechelen, situated through the arch on the right side.

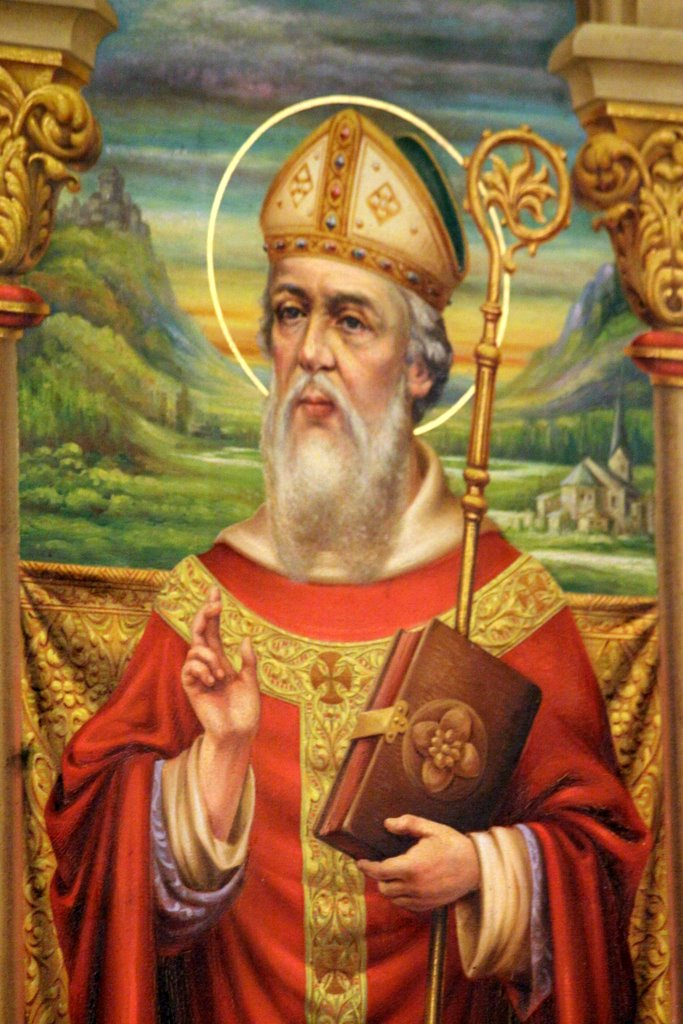
Saint Rumbold on a painting in the Basilica of Our Lady of Hanswijk, Mechelen.

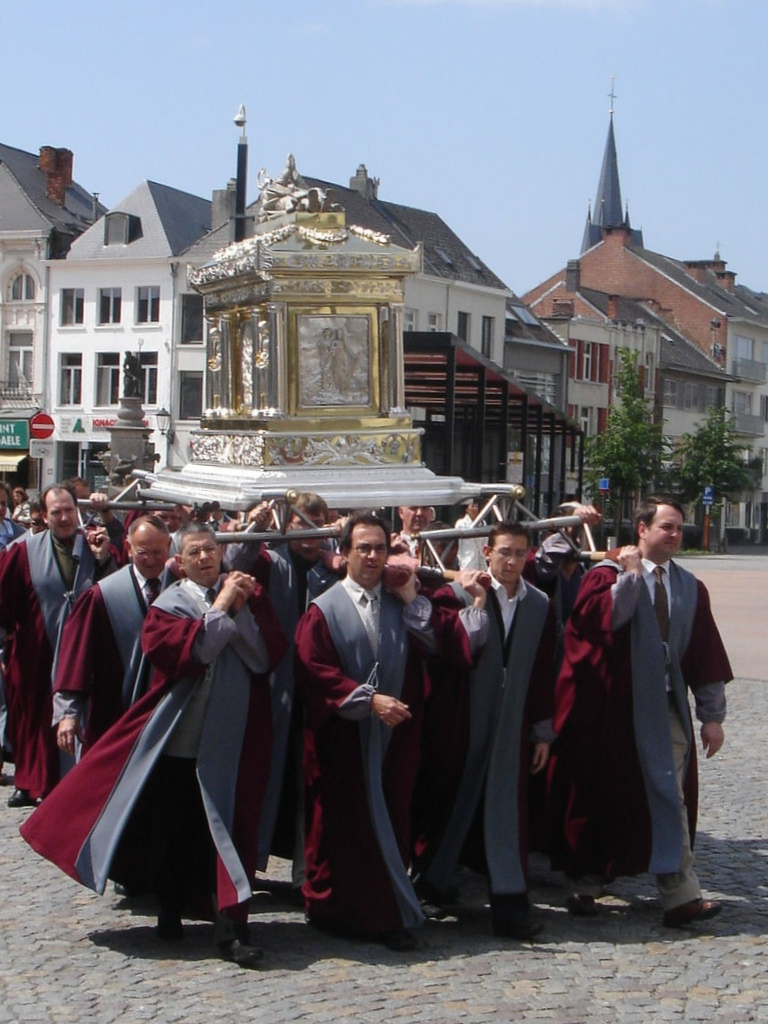
Relics attributed to Saint Rumbold in their shrine, carried along Veemarkt (Cattle Market), Mechelen.

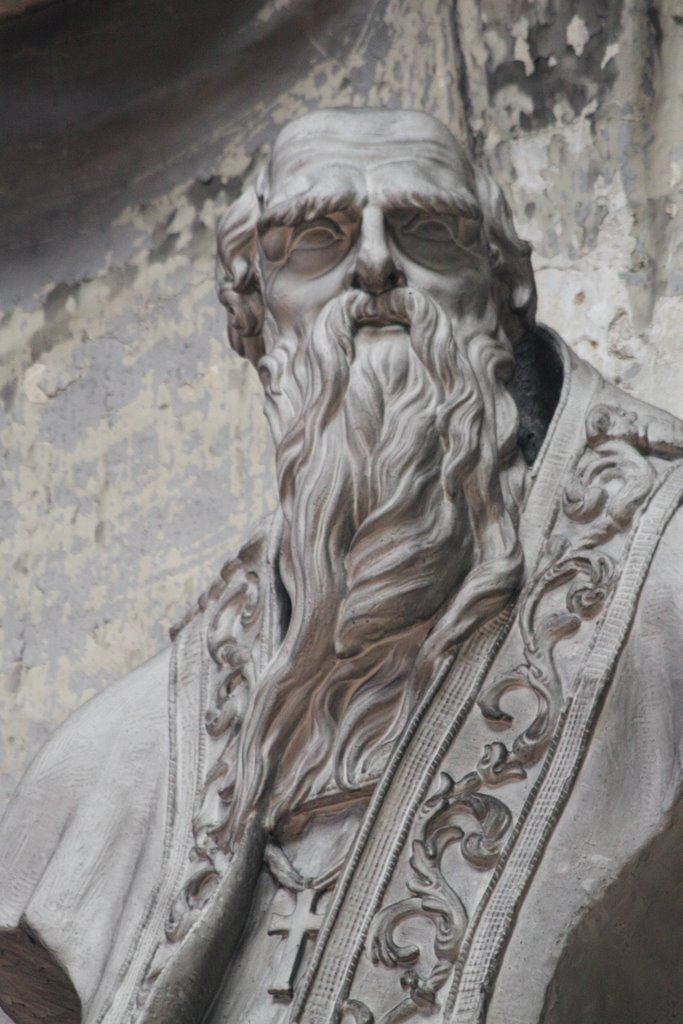
Saint Rumbold's statue in the Basilica of Our Lady of Hanswijk, Mechelen.

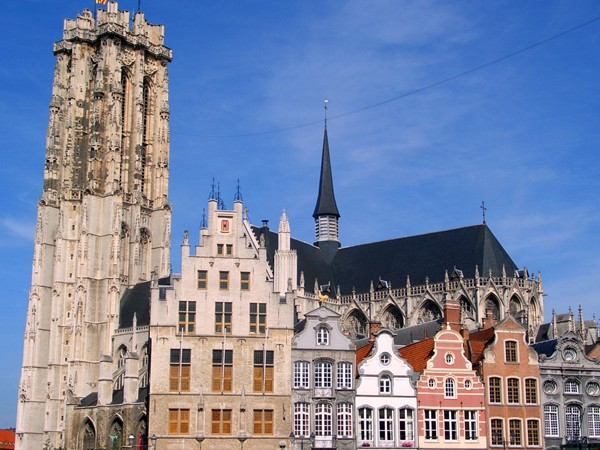
St. Rumbold's Cathedral, Mechelen, treasury of St. Rumbold's reliquary shrine.

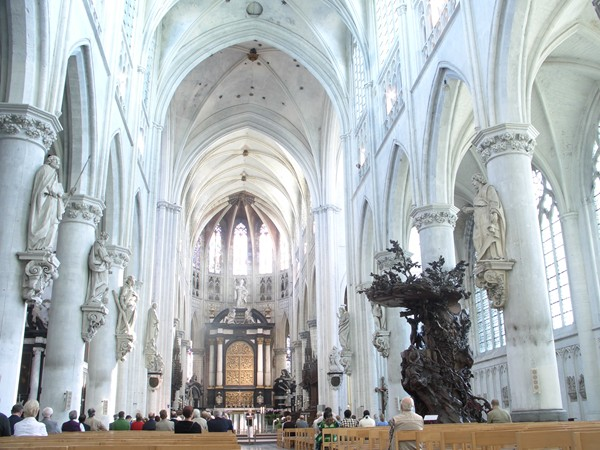
St. Rumbold's Cathedral; at the far end stands the statue of Sanctus Rumoldus, aka Saint Rumbold, above the high altar.
