= Frans Langhemans =

Flemish sculptor

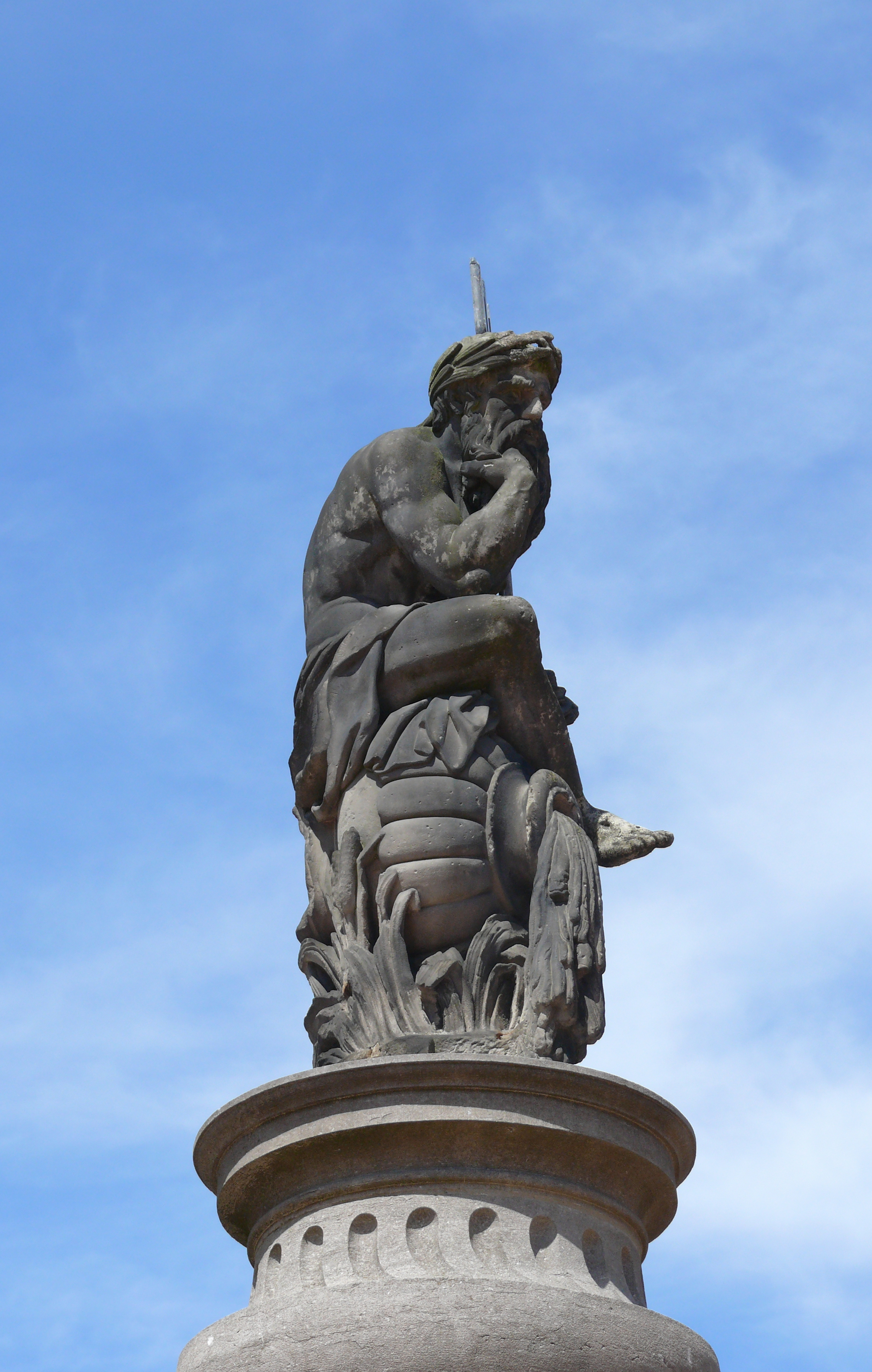
Statue of Neptune, Mechelen

Frans Langhemans (Mechelen, 1661 – 1720) was a Flemish sculptor mainly active in Mechelen. He worked for a time as a court sculptor in Düsseldorf. He is mainly known for this church furniture and statues of saints.

== Life ==
Born in Mechelen, he was trained in the Flemish Baroque style by Lucas Faydherbe, a sculptor of Mechelen who had studied and worked in Rubens' workshop in Antwerp. He spent time in London working with fellow Mechelen sculptor Jan van Steen, before joining the Mechelen guild on his return home.

He was a court sculptor at the court of Elector Johann-Wilhelm at Düsseldorf from 1701 to 1706.

== Notable works ==
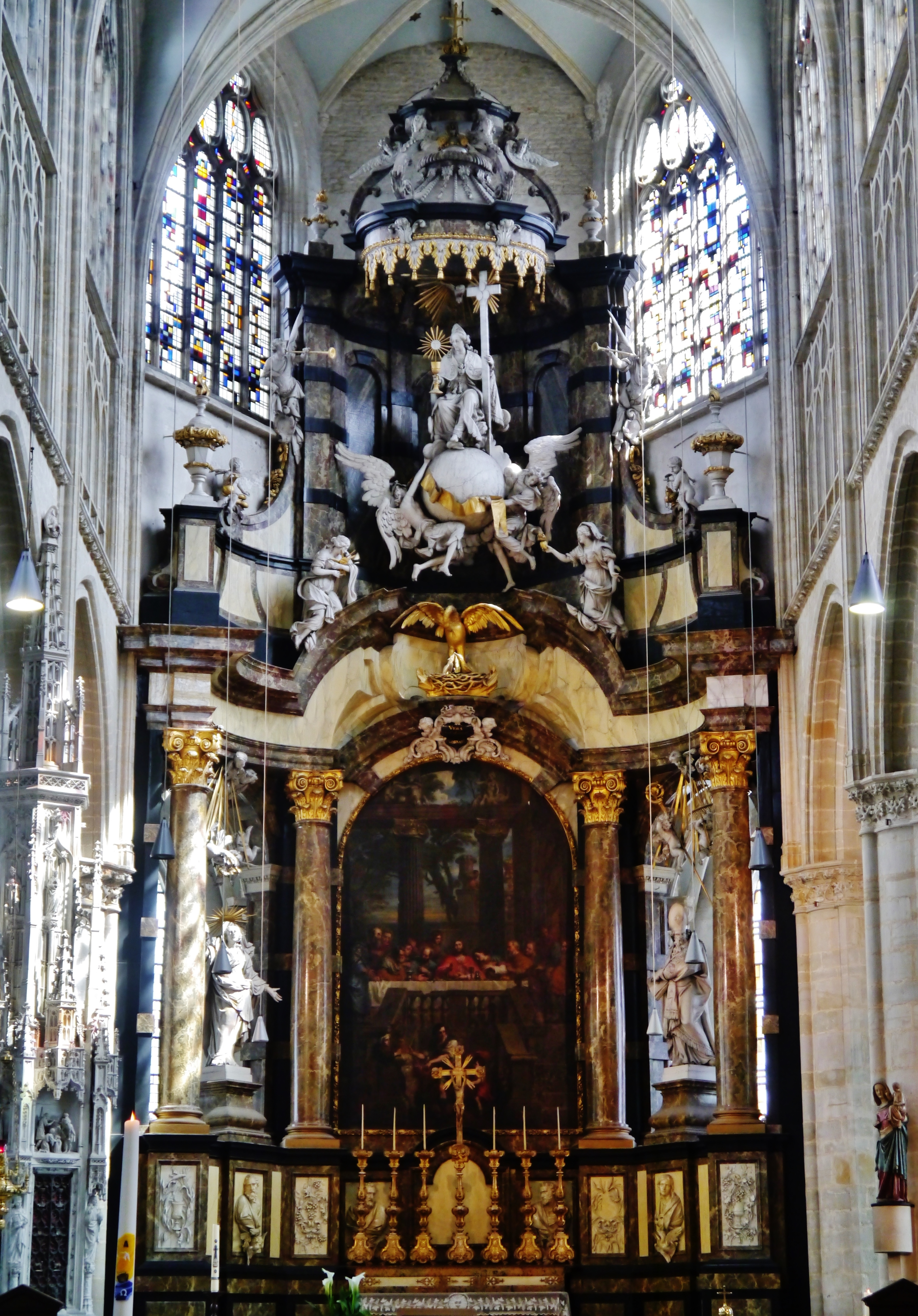
High altar, Our-Lady-on-the-Dijle Church, Mechelen

His more notable works are:

- 1680 – Saint-Rumbolds Cathedral, Mechelen: stone sculpture inscribed on the base ' h. Freedman Marcus Antonius ', commissioned by the de Coriache family.
- 1690 – Our-Lady-on-the-Dijle Church, Mechelen: wooden baroque high altar by Jan Frans Boeckstuyns, Frans Langhemans and Laurens van der Meulen.
- 1701 – high altar of the Abbey Church of Grimbergen, with images of Saints Peter and Paul; side wings with images of Saints Augustine and Norbert. Set up under the prelate Herman de Munck. Attributed to Frans Langhemans. The mount contains on each side a door giving access to the back of the altar. In the middle is a painting of "the Assumption of Mary". Inside are St. Peter and St. Paul. On the side wings are the images of St. Augustine and St. Norbert.
- 1701 – Saint-Rumbolds Cathedral, Mechelen: stone sculpture, 'St Mary Magdalen' by Frans Langhemans, on console with epitaph inscription, erected by the family Van Zijpe.
- 1718 – cattle market, Mechelen: ' fountain of Neptune', a monumental city pump with a pedestal sculpted by Frans Langhemans on a commission by the municipal council. Willem Egidius van Buscom added in the late 18th-century on the pedestal the letters 'SPQM' (abbreviated Latin for Senatus Populusque Mechliniensis ), which means 'Government and People of Mechelen'. The statue is also known as ' Vadderik ', or sloth.

Some of his works are known only through engravings, such as his work in Cologne from 1712 to 1713 consisting of side altars for the Augustinian church, and the altar for the parish church of St Servinus there.
