= Theodoor Verhaegen =

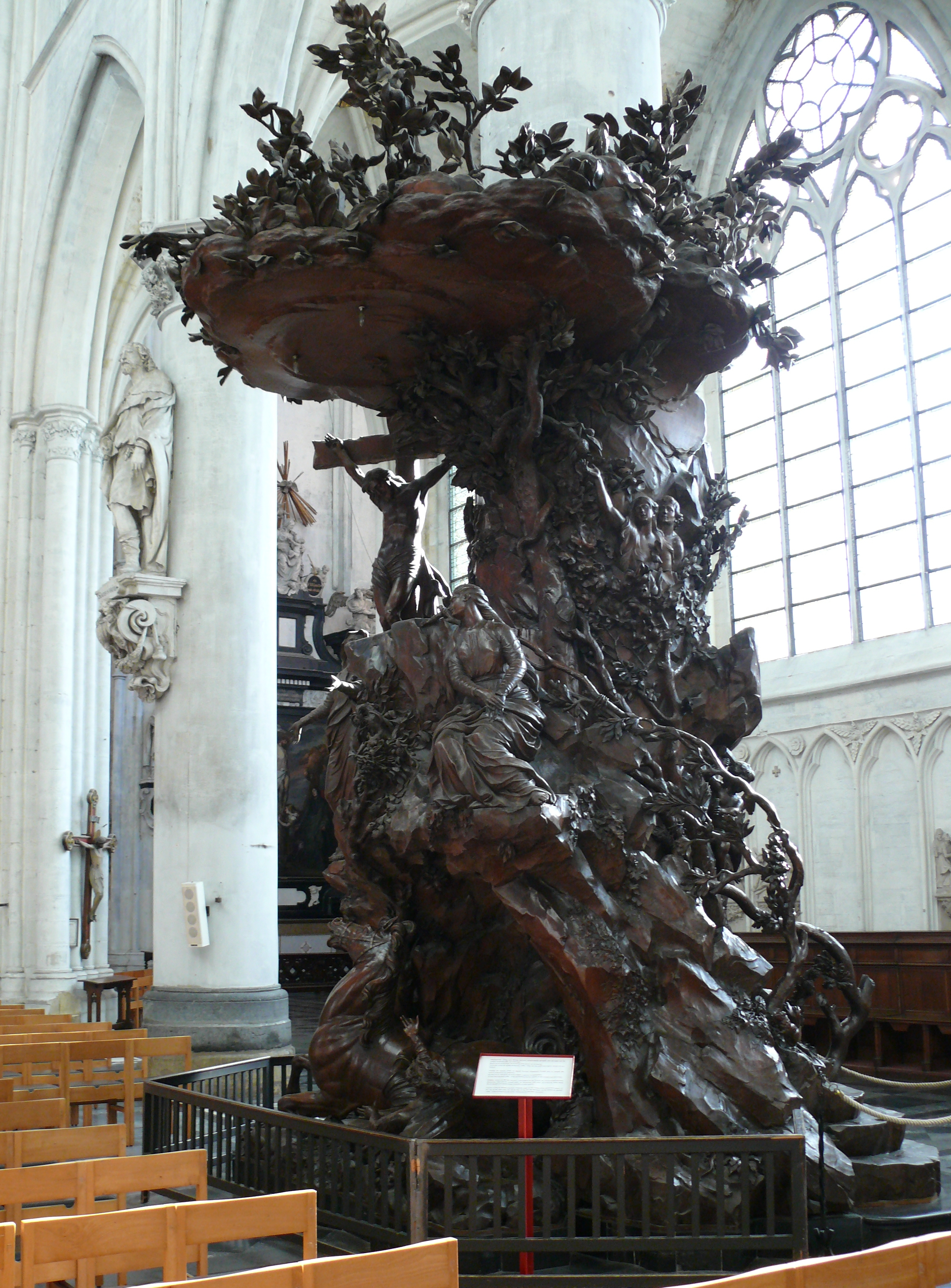
Carved oak pulpit in Mechelen cathedral.

Theodoor Verhaegen (4 June 1700 – 25 July 1759) was an 18th-century Flemish sculptor. His woodcarvings are known for its baroque expression.

== Biography ==
He was born in Mechelen as the son of the sculptor Rombout Verhaegen. He is known for religious works in Mechelen, where he worked with his contemporary, the sculptor Jan Frans Boeckstuyns. He died in Mechelen.

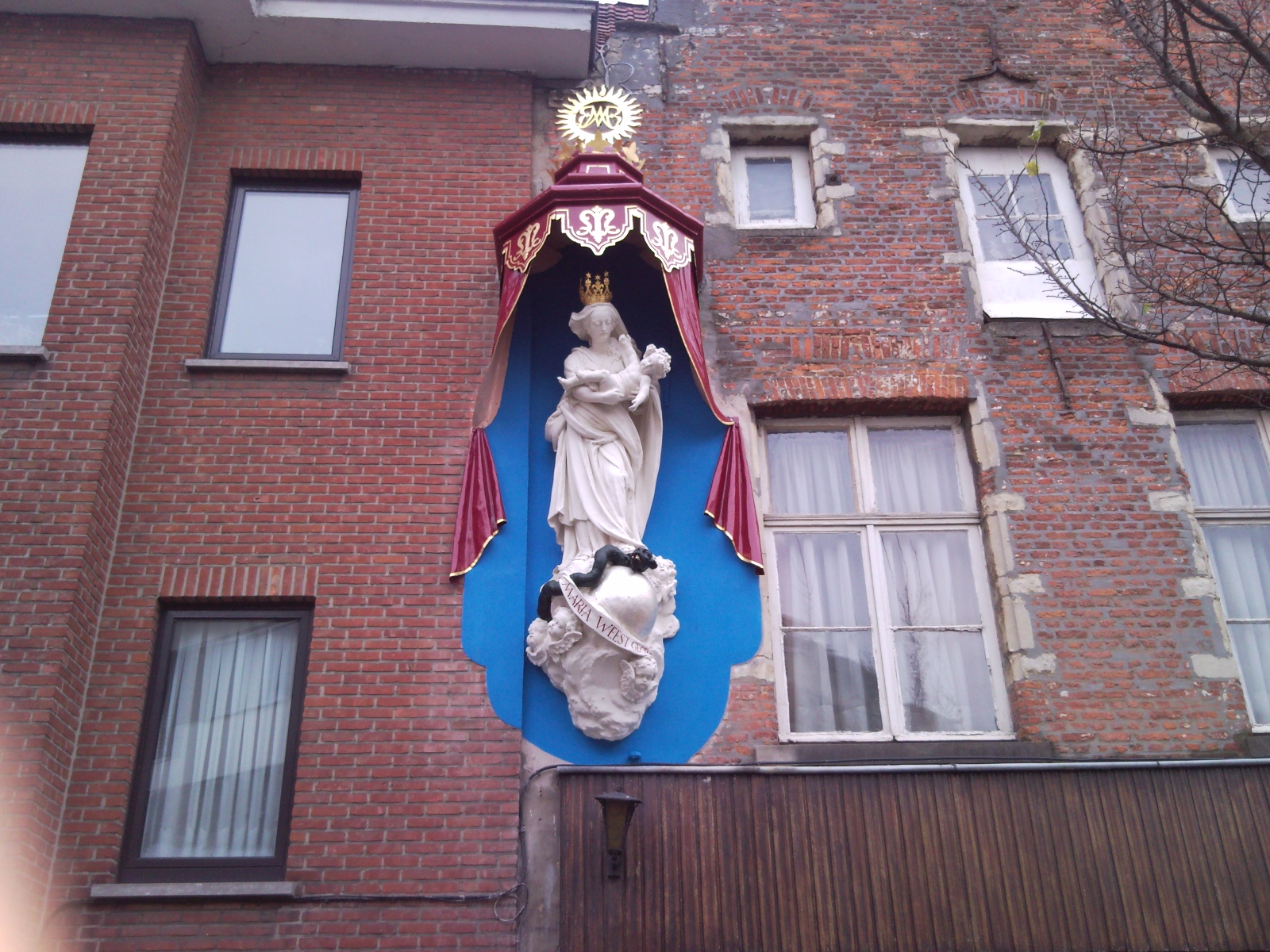
Mechelen

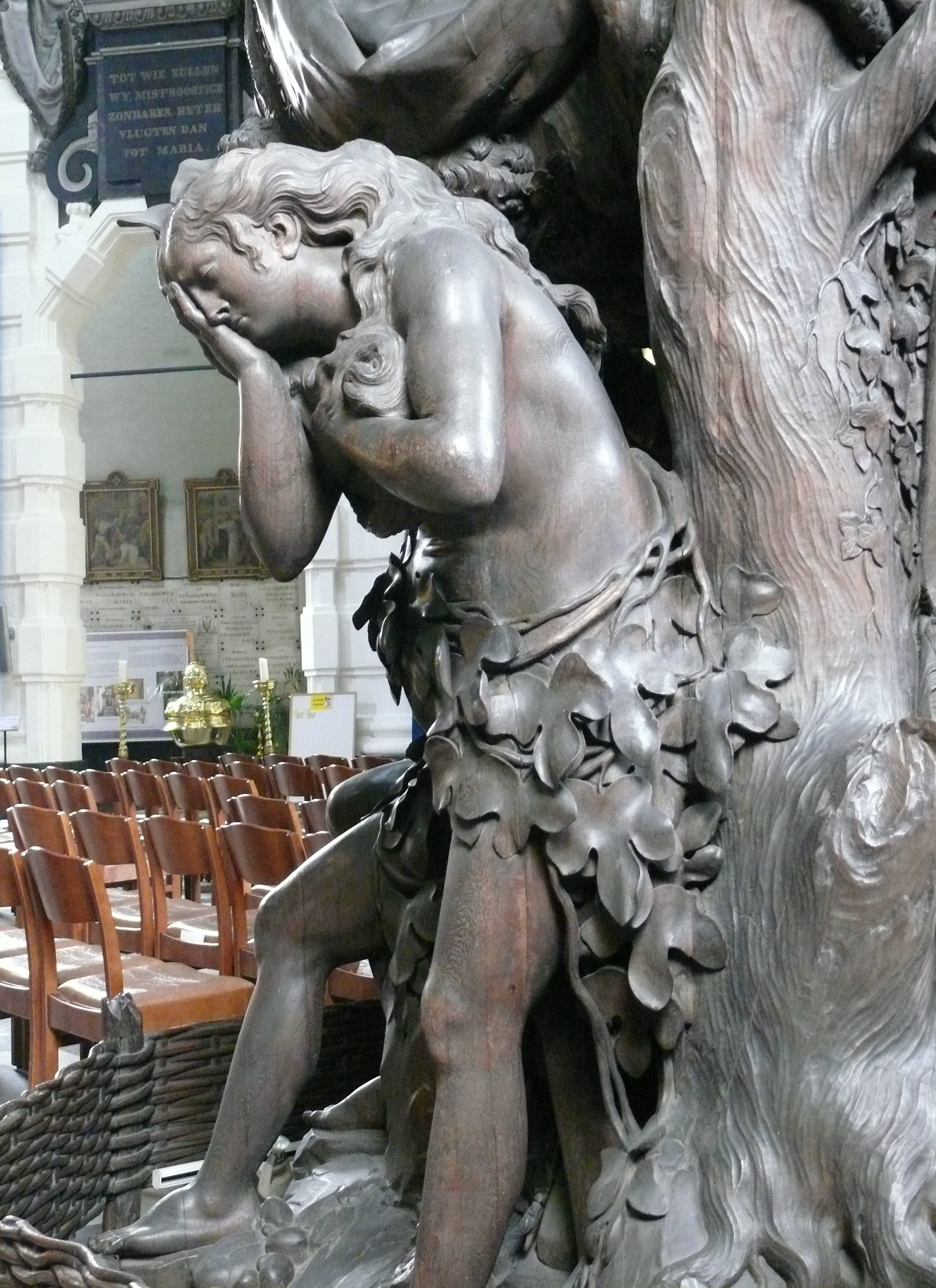
Mechelen

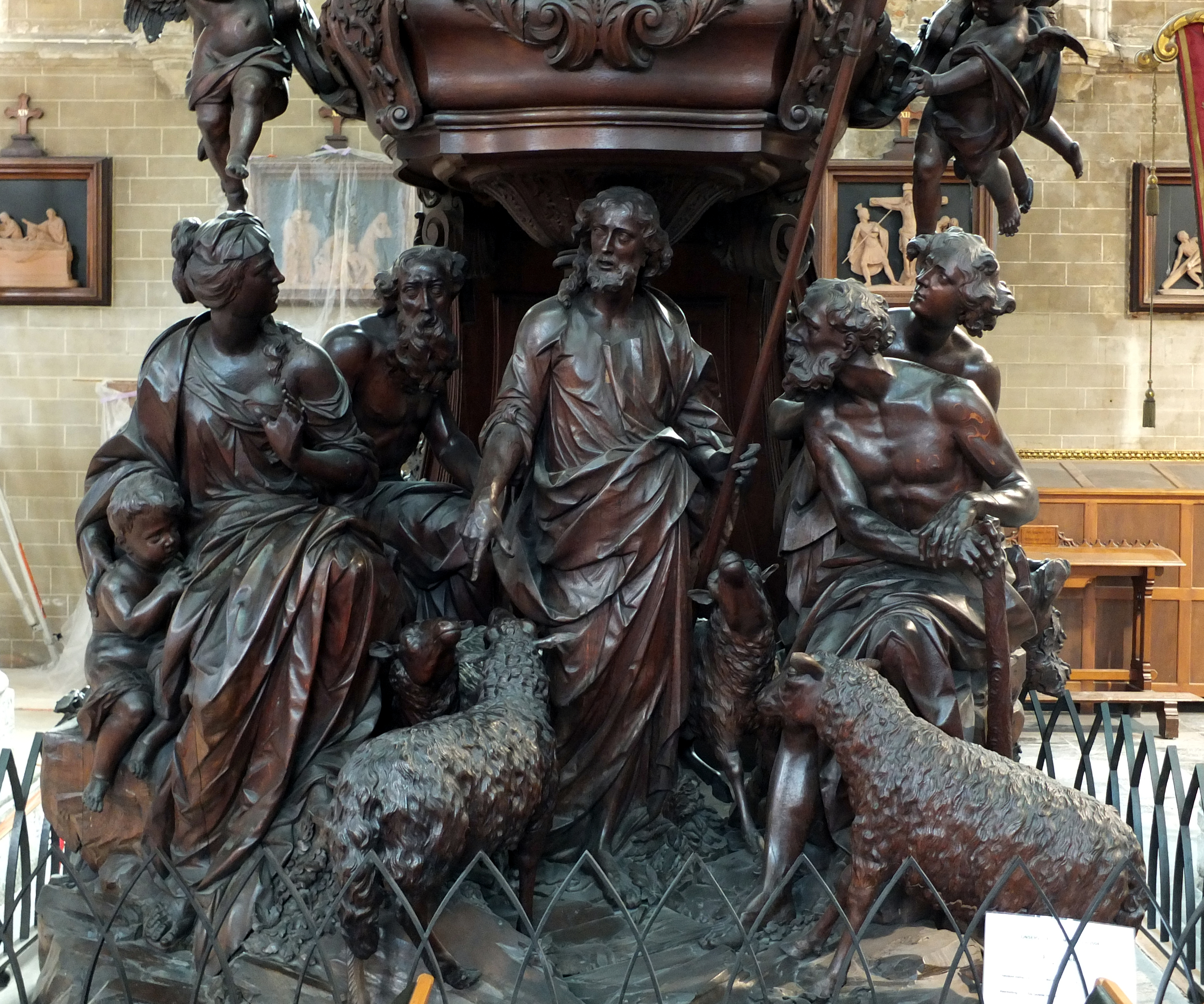
Pulpit Mechelen

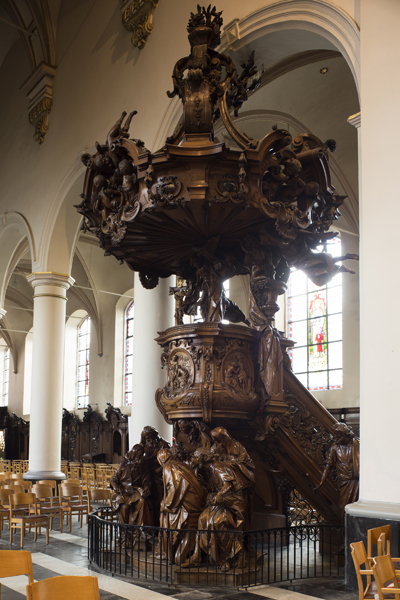
Pulpit Lokeren

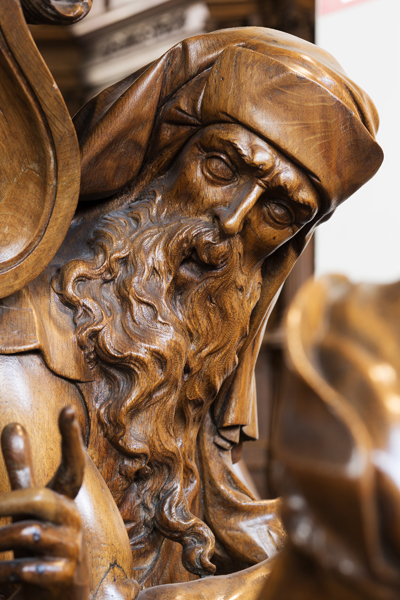
Detail pulpit Lokeren

== Selection of carvings ==
- pulpit of Leliëndaal, now Mechelen Cathedral.
- Pulpit of Our Lady of Hanswijk, Mechelen.

$ interior of Church in Ninove.
