= Willem Augustin van Minderhout =

Flemish painter (1680–1752)

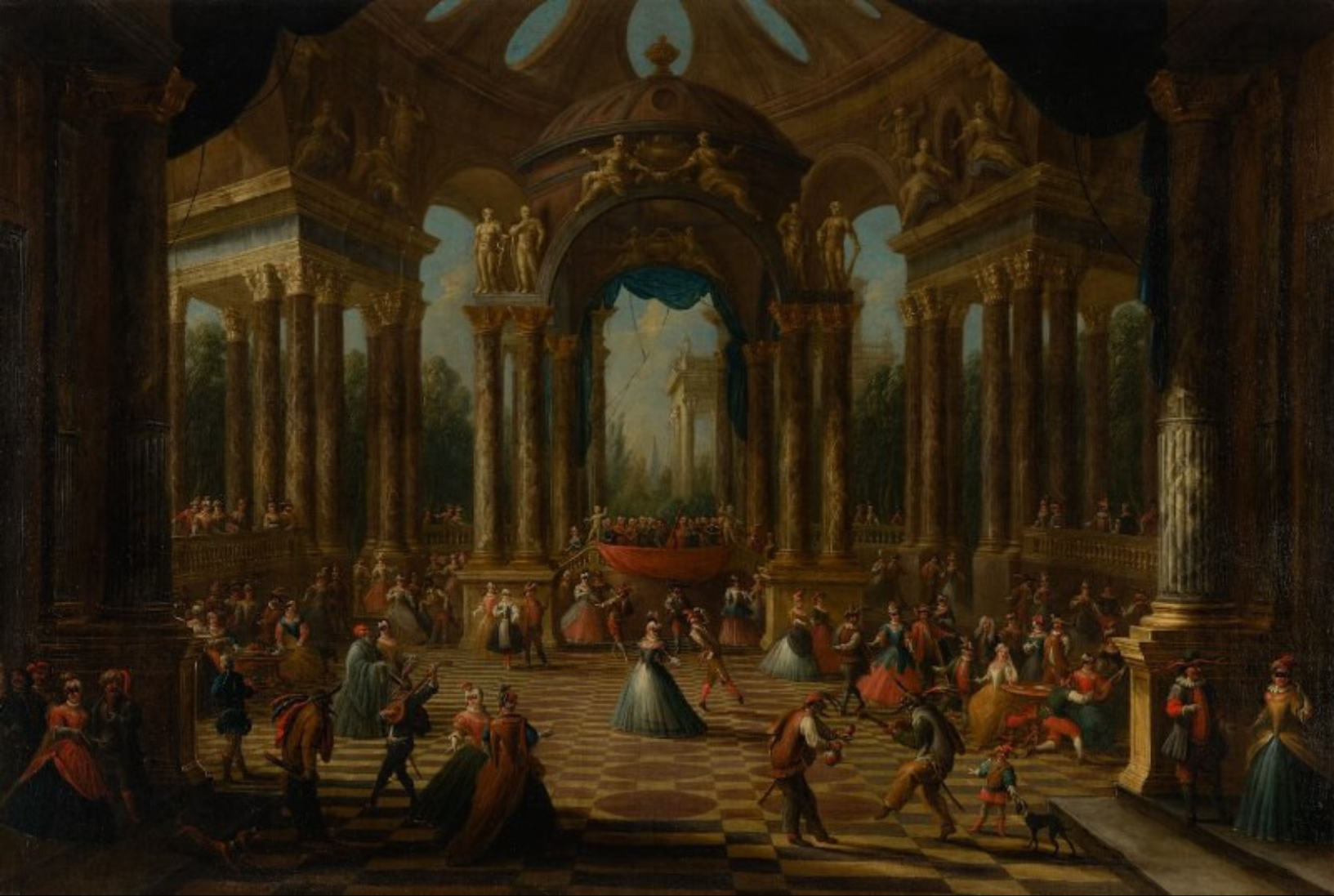
Masquerade

Willem Augustin van Minderhout (August 1680 – 31 May 1752), was a Flemish painter. After training and working in Antwerp, he moved later in his career to work in the area of Moravia (now in the Czech Republic). He is known for his architectural paintings with figures enjoying themselves with dance, masquerades and other forms of entertainment, and his church interiors. He may also have painted some marine scenes, which was the specialty of his father.

== Life ==
Van Minderhout was born in Antwerp and baptised on 29 August 1680. He was born as the son of Hendrik van Minderhout and his father's second wife, Anna Victoria Claus. His father was a Dutch-born marine painter who was primarily active in the Flemish cities Bruges and Antwerp. Willem Augustin had an older brother, Antoon, who was also a painter.

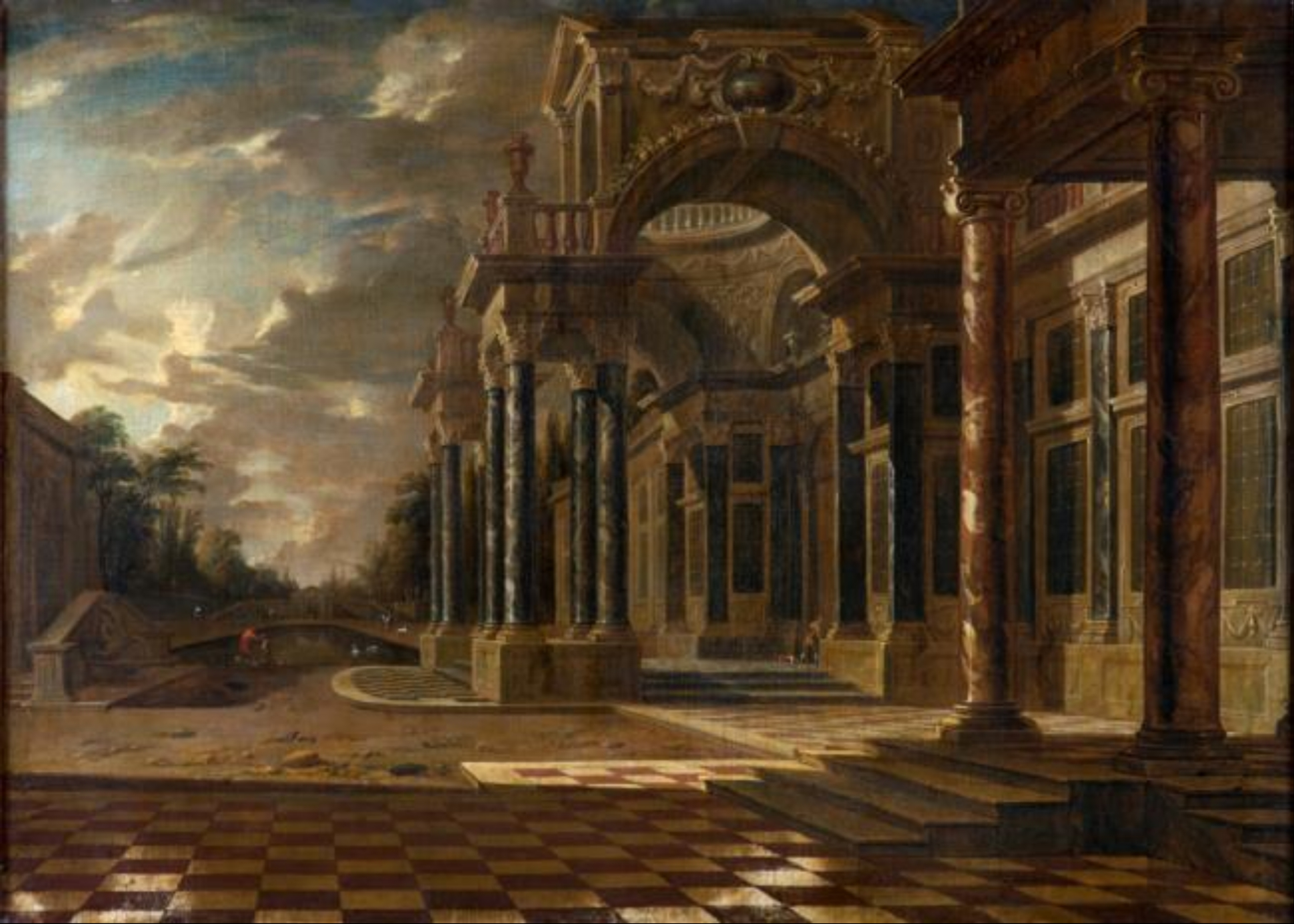
Architectural capriccio with figures

Very little is known about Willem Augustin's training and early career. Unlike his brother, there is no record of him registering as a pupil or a master at the Antwerp Guild of Saint Luke. He likely trained with his father and then worked in his father's workshop.

He married Marie Jacqueline Witlockx, the daughter of Willem Witlockx, who was a well-known bellfounder in his time. They had a son named Willem Hendrik. After his wife died, he commenced a peripatetic life which would bring him to the Holy Roman Empire and in particular Moravia. Here he seems to have been employed on various decorative projects in the palaces of the local aristocracy and higher clergy. He worked on the decoration of the palace halls in Kroměříž Castle, the principal residence of the bishops of Olomouc. At the time Cardinal Ferdinad Julius Troyer (1745–1758) was the resident bishop.

He died in Střílky, Moravia, on 31 May 1752.

== Work ==
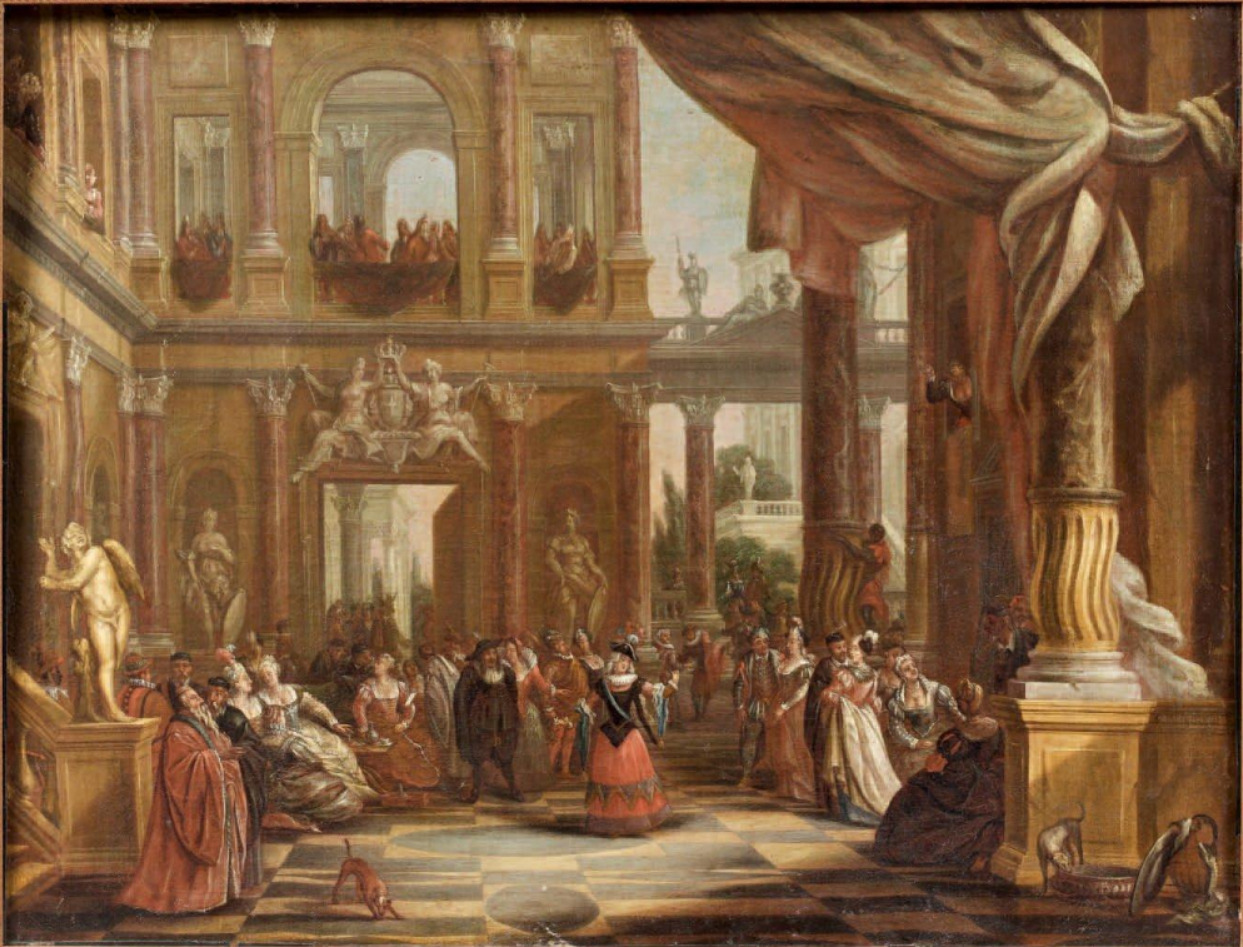
A ball outside a palace

Very few of his works have been identified. Van Minderhout is mainly known for his architectural landscapes with figures, and his church interiors. He may also have painted marines with ships at sea or in harbours.

The majority of his known works show imaginary architecture which serves as the setting for scenes with elegant figures dancing or enjoying a masquerade. An example are the pair of Masquerades in the Moravian Gallery in Brno. In one of the two, figures are shown in an impressive open colonnaded hall which appears to be set in a park. The exaggerated perspective of the architecture draws in the eye of the viewer. The fantastic architecture comprises marble columns decorated with statues, garlands and draperies. It serves as the stage for the entertainment of noble ladies and men in fanciful costumes who are seen dancing to the tunes of music or sitting around tables. Some form of performance also seems to be on process. At the back is an elevated balcony from which viewers are watching the people below. These types of pictures served as decorations for palaces. They played on the interaction between the real and the illusionary palaces and were popular with the elites at the time.

An early Flemish painting tradition of depicting ball scenes had been developed by the Antwerp painter Hieronymus Janssens, who himself may have been inspired by Rubens' garden of love paintings. The painter Jacobus Ferdinandus Saey regularly painted the fantastic architecture for Hieronymus Janssens' ball scenes. Antwerp painter Jacob Balthasar Peeters, whose work must have been familiar to van Minderhout as he was a pupil of his father, also painted fantastic architectures with elegant figures in exotic costumes. In addition to these homegrown sources, van Minderhout may also have drawn inspiration for his masquerade pictures from Claude Gillot's prints of comedia dell'arte scenes, and the work of the Flemish painter Hendrick Govaerts from Antwerp, who was also active in Central Europe.
