= Wilhelm Schubert van Ehrenberg =

Flemish painter (1630–1676)

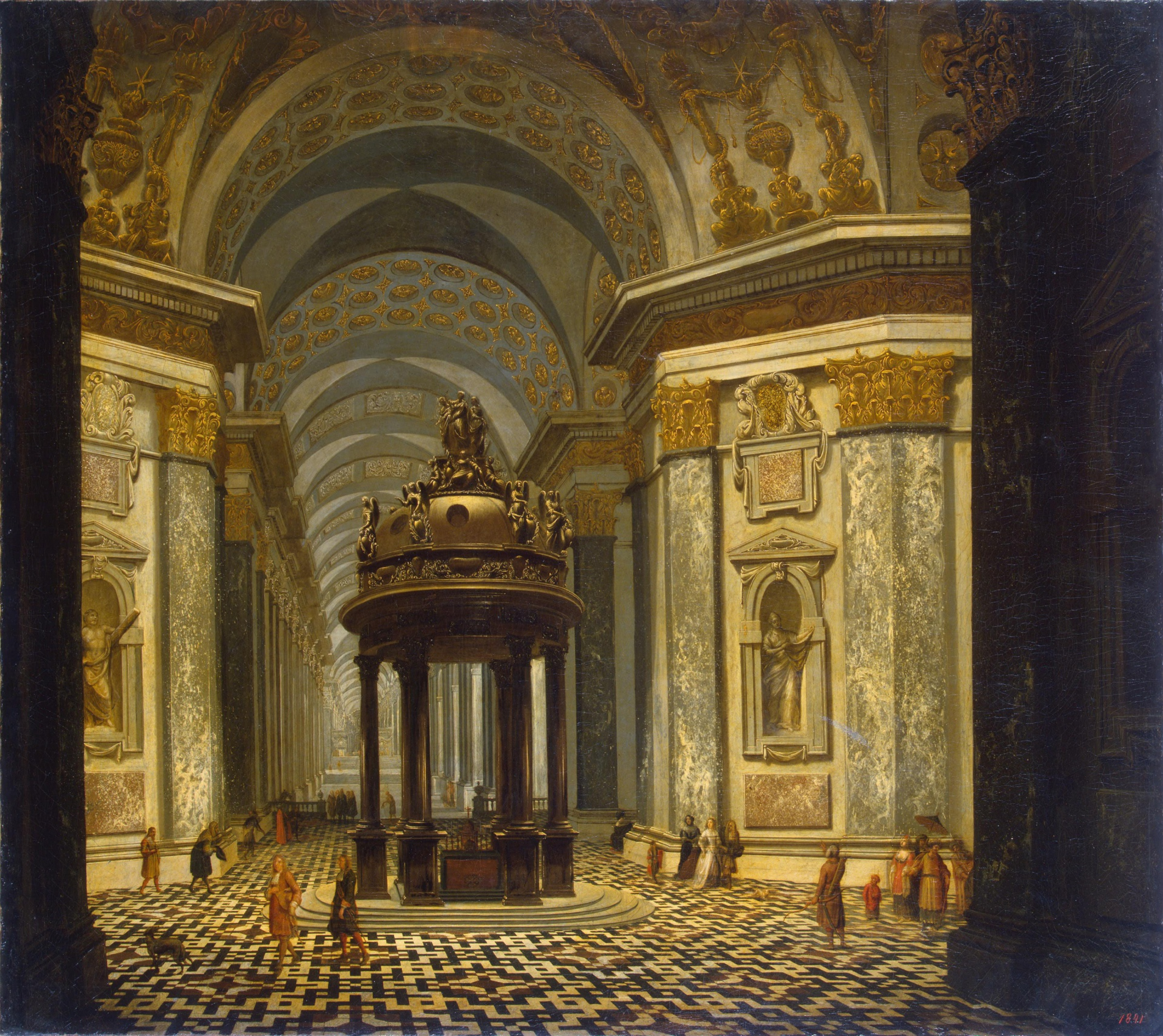
The Interior of a Church

Wilhelm Schubert van Ehrenberg or Willem Schubart van Ehrenberg (also: Wilhem Schubert von Ehrenberg or Wilhem Schubert van Ehrenberg (Antwerp, 1630 or 1637– Antwerp, c. 1676) was a Flemish painter mainly active in Antwerp who specialized in architectural paintings including of real and imaginary church interiors, Renaissance palaces and picture galleries.

== Life ==
Most likely born in Antwerp where his baptism is recorded on 12 May 1630 (despite an unnamed source stating he was born in Germany), he entered the Antwerp Guild of Saint Luke in 1662. He resided in Antwerp for most of his life. Some art historians have suggested that he may have travelled to Italy as he made drawings of Italian subjects. His interiors of St. Peter's Basilica and other Roman subjects, are, however, based on engravings by contemporary artists, some of which are datable to the period between 1656 and 1667. An Italian sejourn may therefore not have occurred and is unlikely in view of his documented presence in Antwerp. He did visit France and resided in Reims in the period from March to May 1673 as he declared in a notarial statement made in Antwerp 16 months later together with Remacle Serin that they had met and socialised with the Flemish painter Anthoni Schoonjans in Reims.

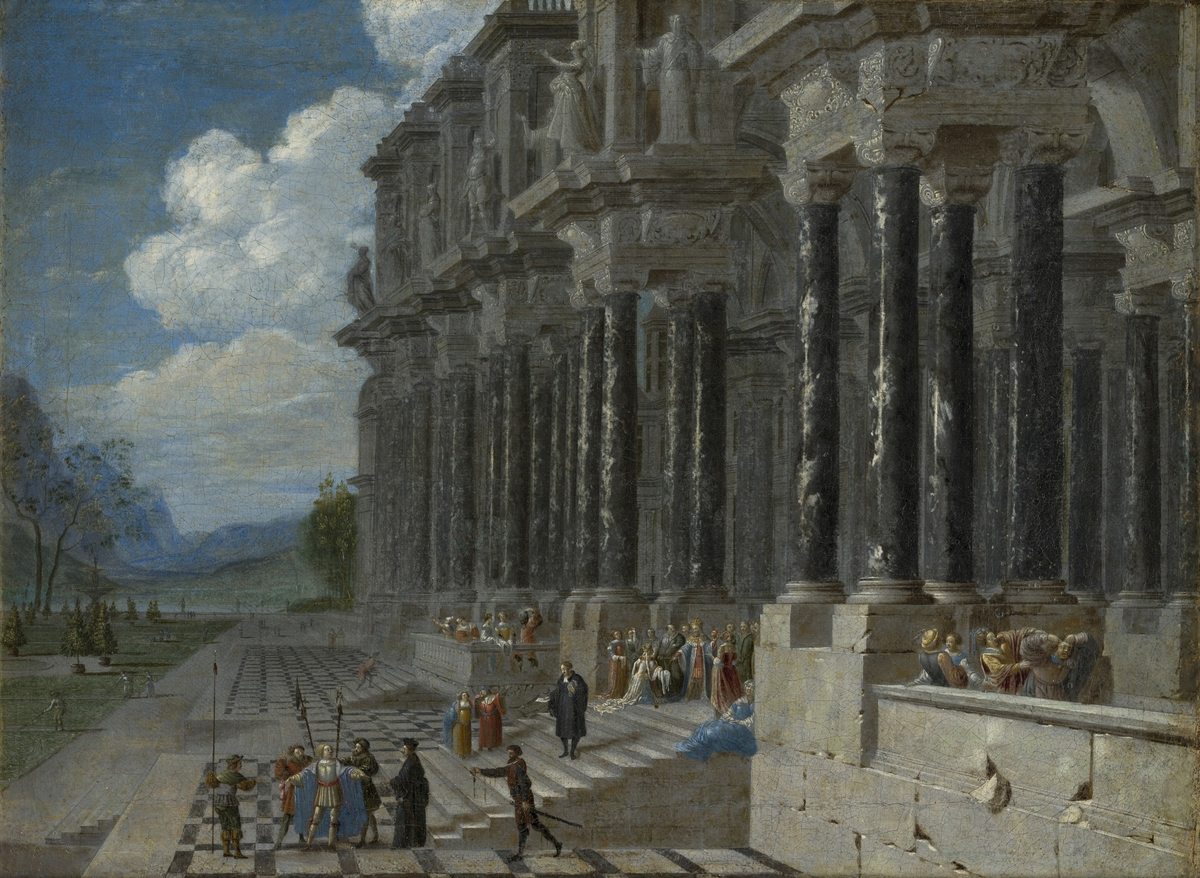
Esther before Ahasuerus

He became a member of the local schutterij (militia) and the chambers of rhetoric 'De Olijftak' and 'De Violieren'.

He married on 5 August 1665 in Antwerp Maria Seys, daughter of the painter Jan Seys. Their children were Lucas Willem (baptized 18 October 1666) and Peter Schubert van Ehrenberg (baptized 6 February 1668. The date of his death is not known with certainty and is believed to have occurred between 1687 (the latest date of one of his dated works) and 1707.

He was the teacher of the painter of architecture paintings Jacobus Ferdinandus Saey.

His son Peter Schubart von Ehrenberg was also an artist who had a successful career as a painter, engraver and stage designer in Vienna.

== Work ==
=== General ===
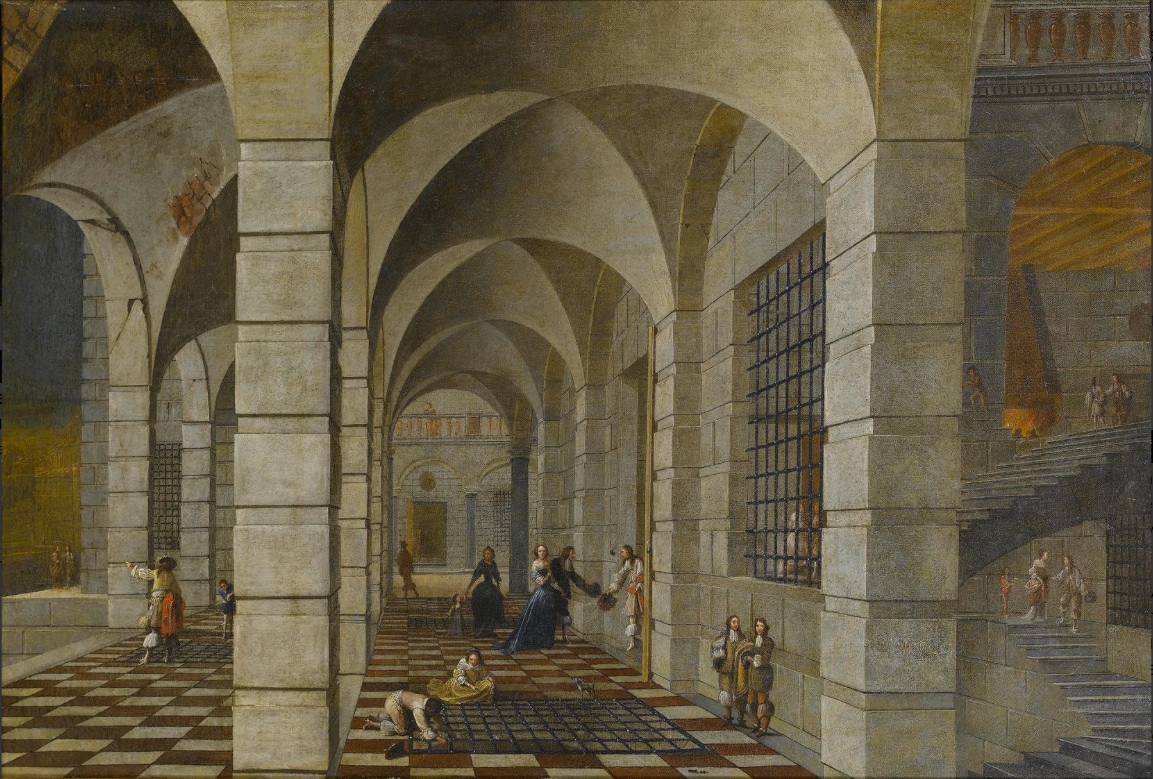
Dungeon interior with elegant figures, a collaboration with Hieronymous Janssens

The majority of van Ehrenberg's pictures were painted between 1660 and 1670. He often collaborated with other artists who added the figures or animals. This was a common practice in 17th century Antwerp. His collaborators included Hendrik van Minderhout, Gaspar de Witte, Hieronymus Janssens and Charles Emmanuel Biset.

=== Architectural works ===
Van Ehrenberg painted many architectural paintings usually of imaginary church interiors, temples, palaces and art galleries. Paintings such as the Interior of the Saint-Carolus-Borromeus Church in Antwerp (1667; Royal Museums of Fine Arts of Belgium, Brussels) emphasize the Baroque architecture of the space depicted, but are more artificial than his Dutch Golden Age contemporaries such as Pieter Jansz Saenredam or Emanuel de Witte. His Interior of the St. Peters' Church in Rome stands in the tradition of Antwerp architecture art from the first half of the 17th century. However, the spatial effect in the oeuvre of van Ehrenberg is stronger. He showed a particular preference for the fantastic and pathetic, which he emphasized further with light-dark contrasts and a staffage of almost dwarfish figures (often painted by other artists).

Of particular interest are a set of paintings representing the Seven Wonders of the World such as the Mausoleum of Halicarnassus and The Temple of Diana at Ephesus (both in the Musée Henri Dupuis Saint-Omer) and the two paintings of ruined tombstones (both in Oxford College Anon II, University of Oxford).

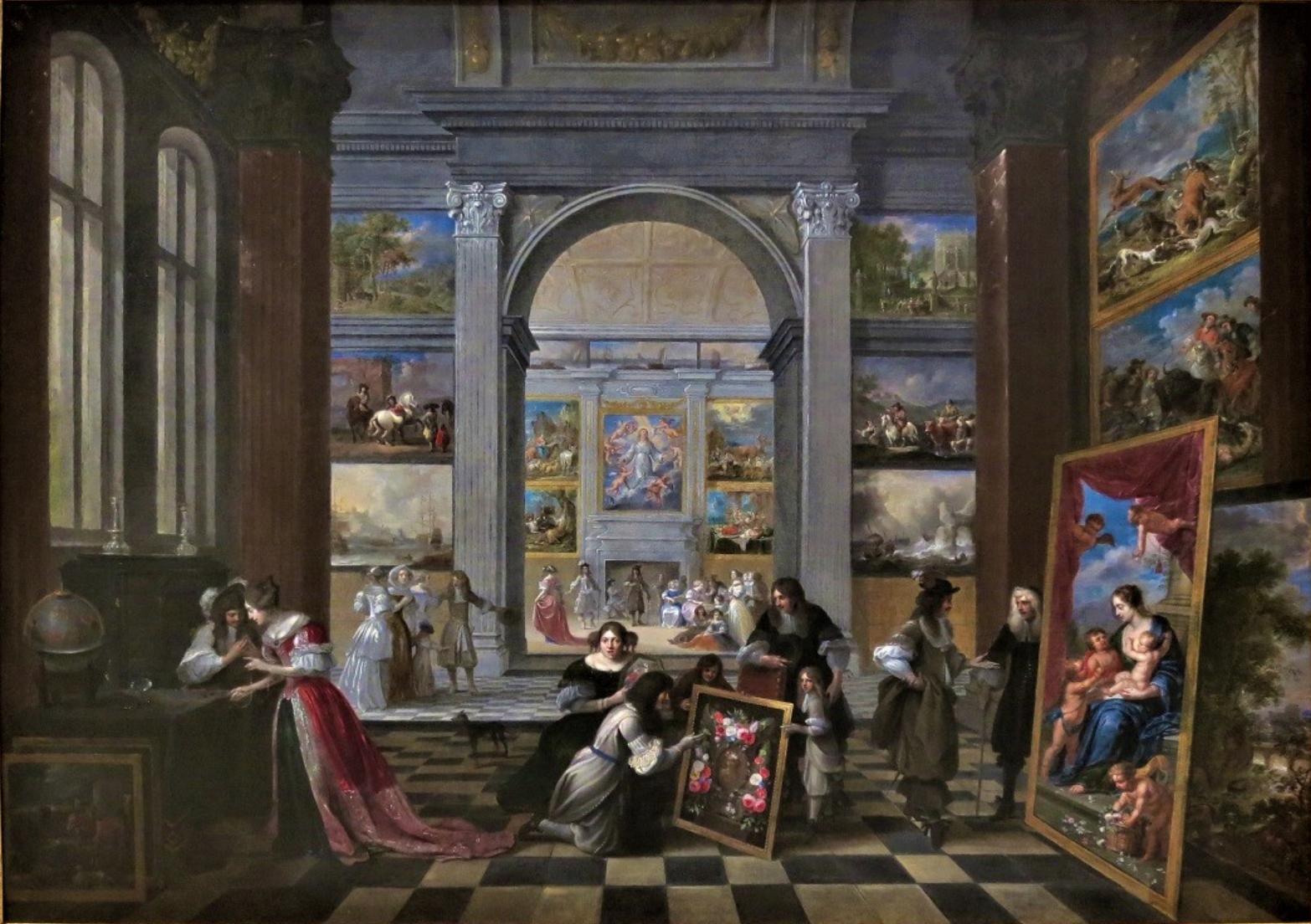
Interior of an art collector's cabinet with many visitors, a collaboration with Hieronymous Janssens and Gaspar de Witte

=== Gallery paintings ===
Wilhelm Schubert van Ehrenberg worked also in the genre of the 'gallery paintings'. The 'gallery paintings' genre is native to Antwerp where Frans Francken the Younger and Jan Brueghel the Elder were the first artists to create paintings of art and curiosity collections in the 1620s. Gallery paintings depict large rooms in which many paintings and other precious items are displayed in elegant surroundings. The earliest works in this genre depicted art objects together with other items such as scientific instruments or peculiar natural specimens. The genre became immediately quite popular and was followed by other artists such as Jan Brueghel the Younger, Cornelis de Baellieur, Hans Jordaens, David Teniers the Younger, Gillis van Tilborch and Hieronymus Janssens. The art galleries depicted were either real galleries or imaginary galleries, sometimes with allegorical figures.

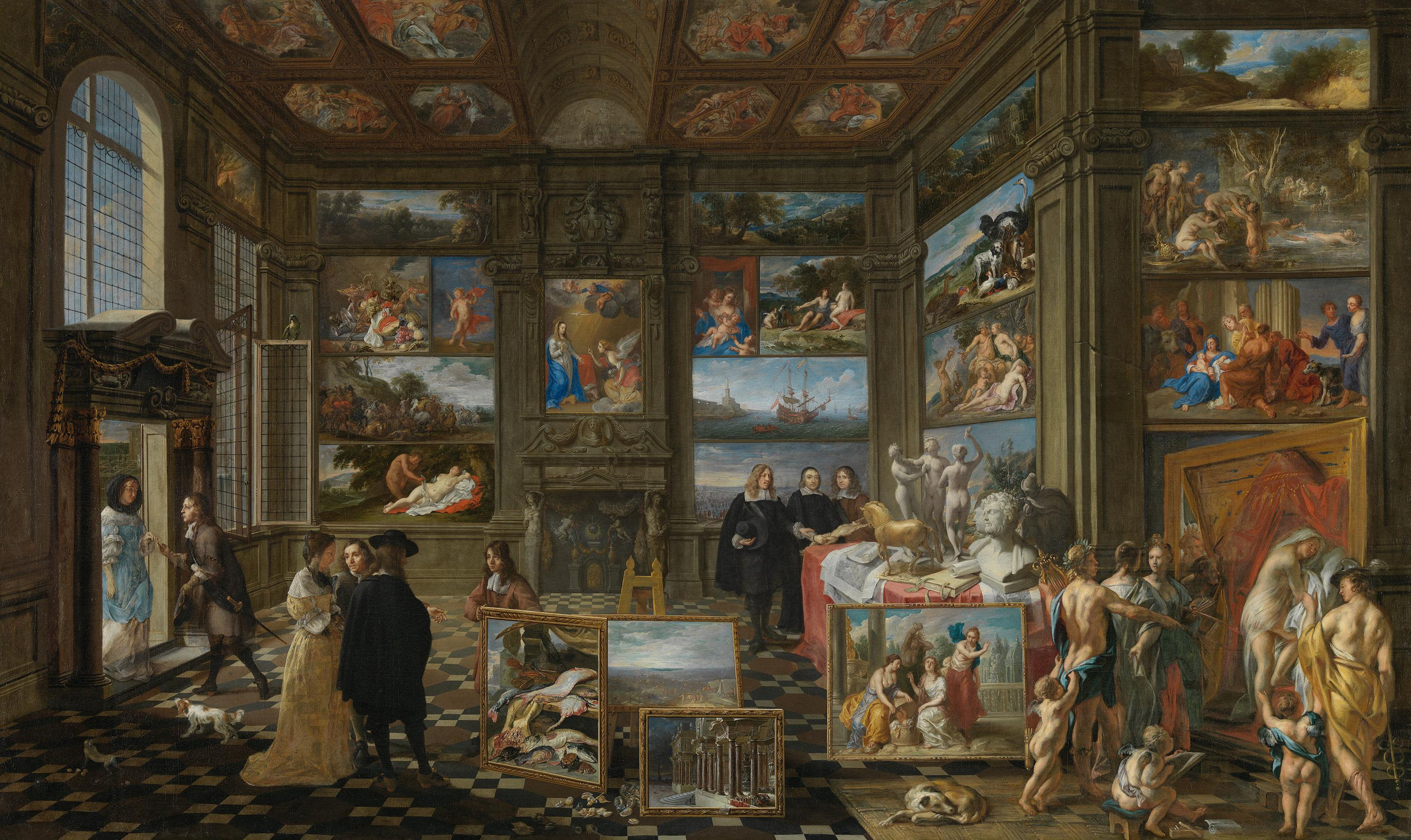
Interior of an Imaginary Picture Gallery

An example of van Ehrenberg's work in this genre is the Interior of an art collector's cabinet with many visitors (Musée Girodet, Montargis). This is a collaboration with Gaspar de Witte and Hieronymus Janssens. The composition depicts an imaginary art gallery with many visitors who are appreciating and discussing some of the artworks in the gallery. This gallery painting represents a later development in the genre initiated by David Teniers the Younger, which excludes non-art objects from the gallery. The figures in the gallery painting are portrayed as forming part of an elite who possess privileged knowledge of art. The genre of gallery paintings had by that time become a medium to accentuate the notion that the powers of discernment associated with connoisseurship are socially superior to or more desirable than other forms of knowing.

Ulysses at the Palace of Circe, collaboration with Carl Borromäus Andreas Ruthart

The Interior of an Imaginary Picture Gallery (Alte Pinakothek, Munich) dated to 1666 falls into the category of allegorical picture galleries, which can be considered a sub-category of the imaginary art gallery type. This composition depicts a large imaginary gallery in which are present a number of persons admiring and scrutinizing artworks and, on the right hand side, figures representing gods and allegorical figures. The painting is a collaboration with each of the individual painters whose work is depicted in the painting and have signed their own work: Theodoor Boeyermans (Daughters of Cecrops and Erychtonius), Pieter Boel (Animal Piece), Jan Cossiers (Diana and Actaeon), Cornelis de Heem (Fruit Still Life), Robert van den Hoecke (Winter Landscape), Philips Augustijn Immenraet (Italianate Landscape), Jacob Jordaens (Gyges and Kandaules and Allegory of Painting), Pieter Thijs (Adoration of the Shepherds), Lucas van Uden (Landscape) and the monogrammists missed PB (Fish Still Life) and PVI or PVH (Satyr and Nymph). Van Ehrenberg painted the architecture as well as the ceiling (which is made up of copies of Rubens' works for the Carolus Borromeuskerk in Antwerp) (later destroyed in a fire). The figures are probably by Charles Emmanuel Biset. Other such collaborations between multiple Antwerp painters on picture gallery paintings are recorded. Another example is Jacob de Formentrou's Cabinet of pictures (also known as Art lovers in a painting cabinet), part of the collection of the Royal Collection. Such paintings can be read as a reference to connoisseurship, and in particular the connoisseur's activity of evaluating the authorship of paintings based on stylistic characteristics. It can also be regarded as a carefully crafted advertisement of the present talent and past legacy of the Antwerp school of painting.
