= Jacobus Ferdinandus Saey =

Flemish painter

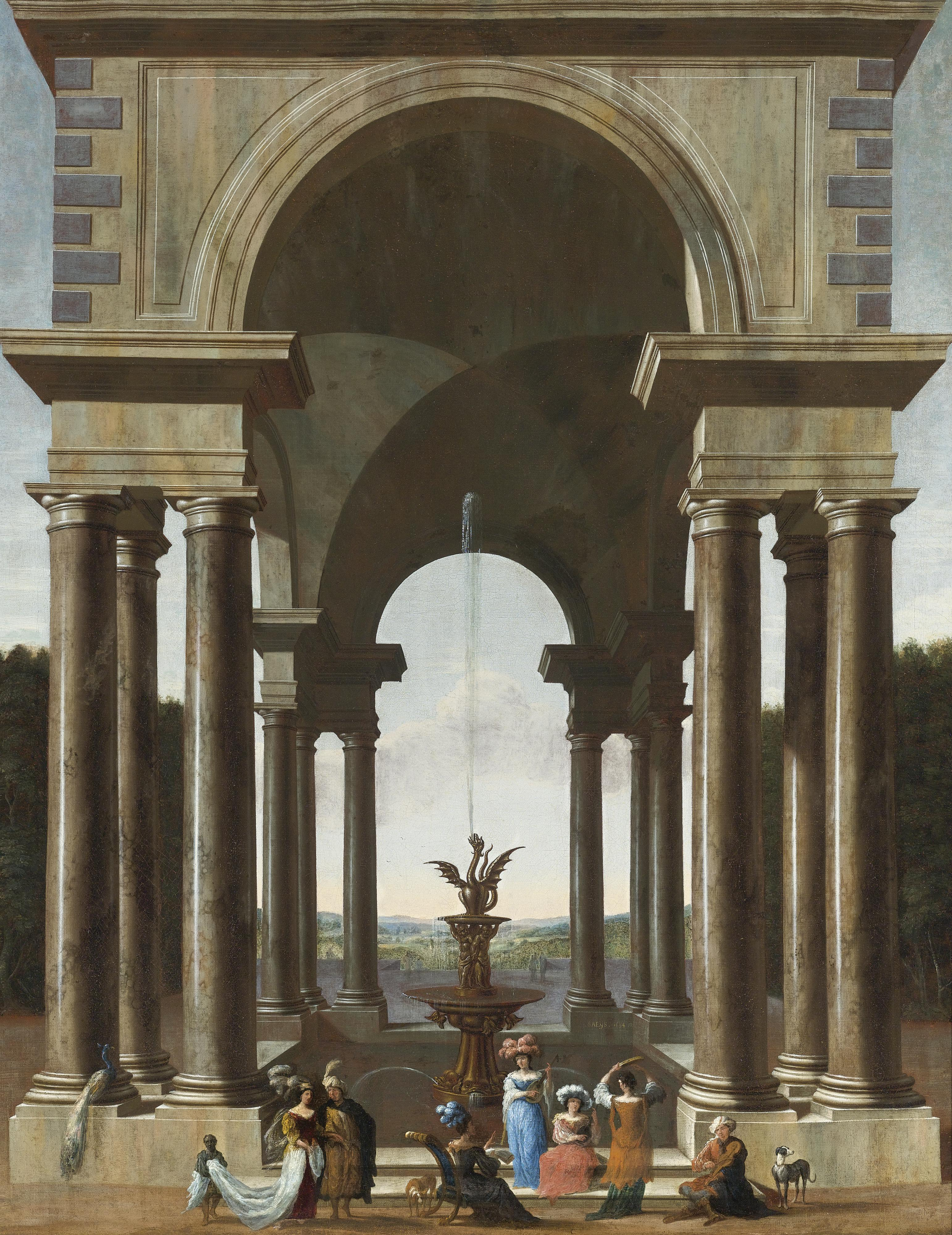
A classical portico with an elegant company gathered by a fountain

Jacobus Ferdinandus Saey or Jacob Ferdinand Saeys (1658 – after 1726) was a Flemish painter who specialized in architectural paintings depicting gallant companies amidst imaginary Renaissance and Baroque palaces and buildings. After starting his career in Flanders, he moved to Vienna, where he worked for the rest of his life.

== Life ==
Jacobus Ferdinandus Saey was born in Antwerp. He was possibly a cousin of the art dealer Jan Saey. He became in 1672–73 an apprentice of the architecture and perspective painter Wilhelm Schubert van Ehrenberg. Some sources state that van Ehrenberg was his uncle. He became a master in the Antwerp Guild of Saint Luke in the guild year 1679–80. He was still recorded in the Antwerp Guild records in 1681. The last record about him in Flanders places him in Mechelen in 1684.

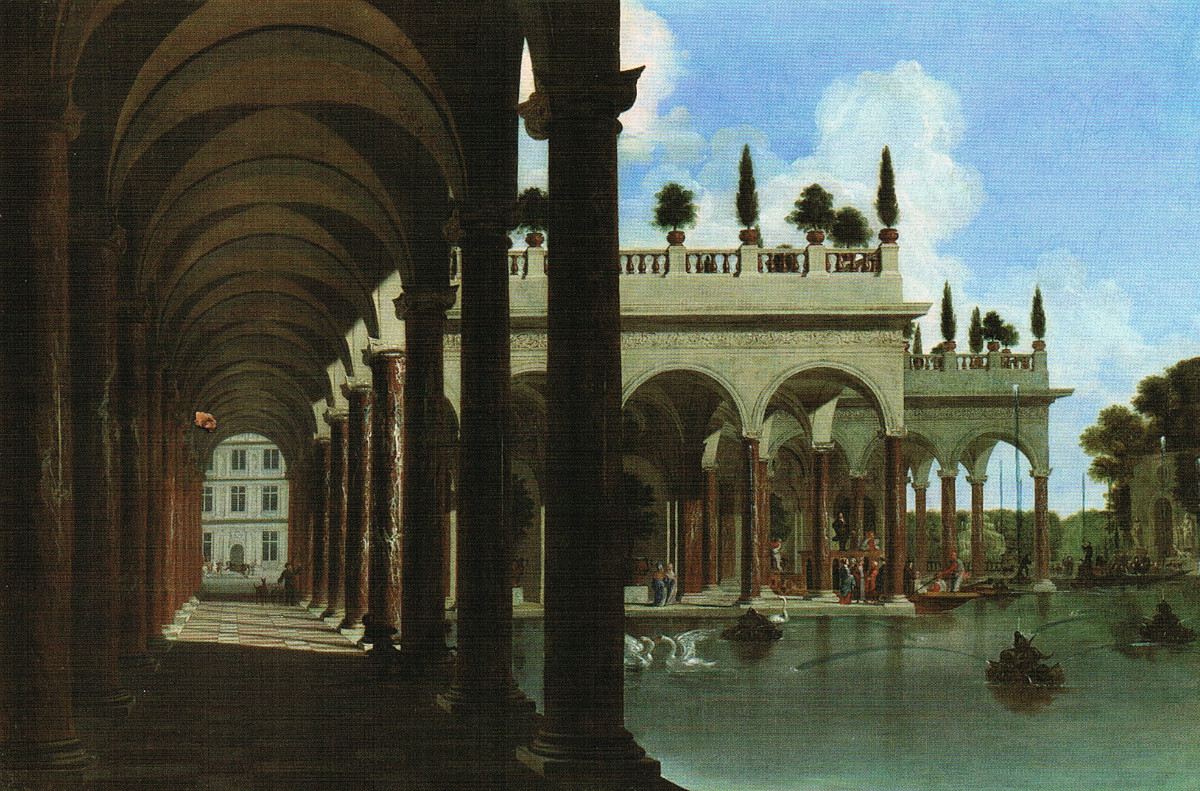
Architectural capriccio with a pond

The next record on the artist relates to his marriage with Maria von Risman in Vienna in 1694. He is known to have been active in Vienna for a number of years prior to his marriage. He lived in the Leopoldstadt district of Vienna. He seems to have kept in touch with members of the Flemish community in Vienna. The painter Peter Schubart von Ehrenberg, the son of Saey's master Wilhelm Schubert van Ehrenberg, and the painter Johannes Erasmus de Crefft were the witnesses at his wedding. The Flemish painter Anthoni Schoonjans was one of the godfathers at the baptism of his daughter Antonia Catharina.

He was still recorded in Vienna in 1726. The date and place of his death are not known.

== Work ==
=== General ===
Jacobus Ferdinandus Saey was in his subject matter influenced by his teacher Wilhelm Schubert van Ehrenberg who mainly painted architectural scenes of real and imaginary churches, Renaissance palaces and picture galleries. Unlike his master, who occasionally painted the interiors of real existing buildings, Saey mostly concentrated on imaginary structures and outdoor settings with elegant companies congregating in an informal manner.

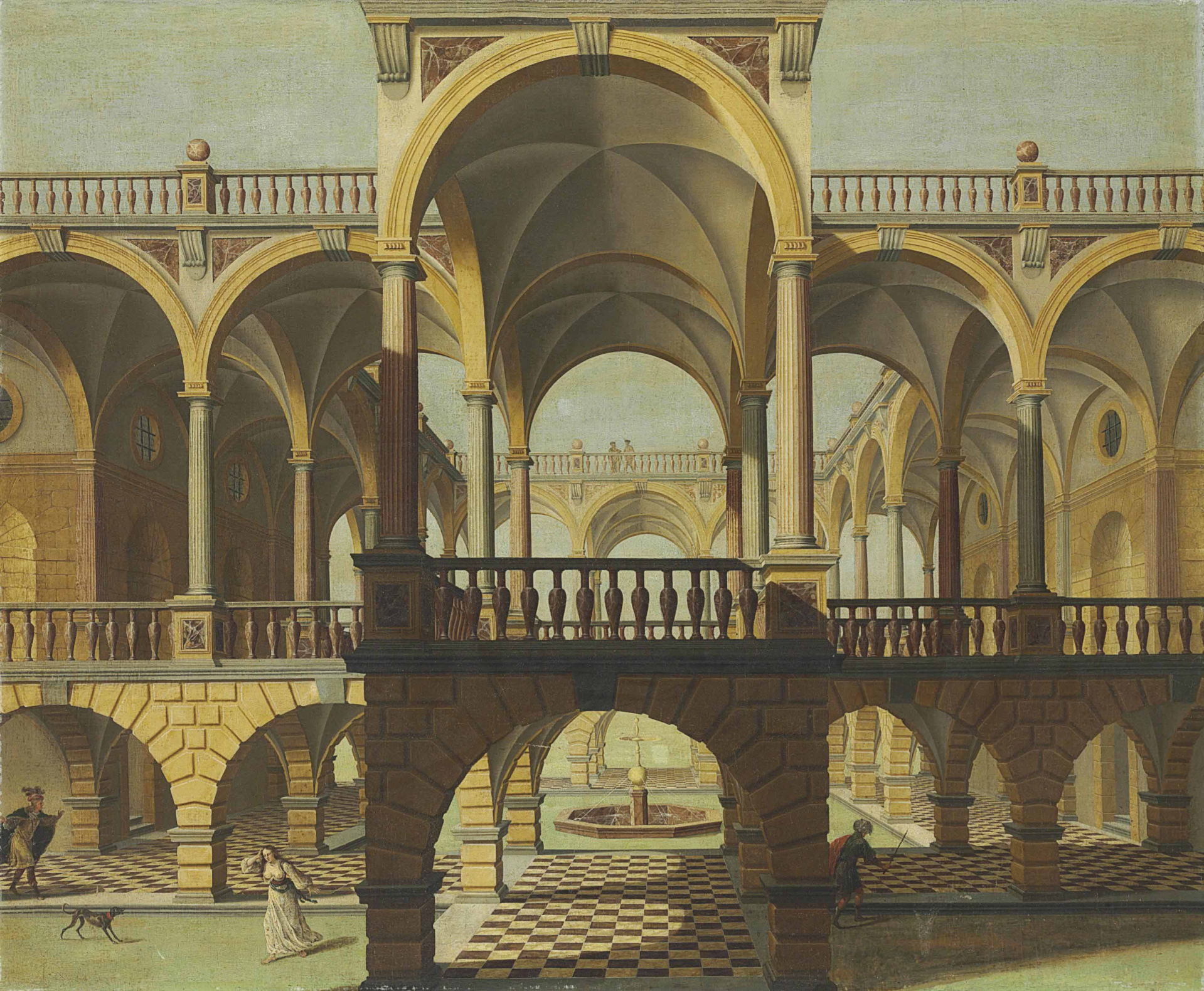
Capriccio of a colonnaded courtyard

Saey was particularly skilled in the use of perspective and the realistic rendering of different materials, in particular the marble of columns. Characteristics of his work are the recurring checkered floors and his dramatic use of light. He regularly collaborated with other artists including Hieronymus Janssens who painted the staffage in his work.

As Saey rarely, in fact almost never, signed his paintings, it is difficult to differentiate his artistic production from that of two other even rarer Flemish painters who worked in almost exactly the same style: his contemporary Jacob Balthasar Peeters and a pupil of Peeters by the name of Jan Baptist van der Straeten.

=== Subject matter ===
The work of Saey seems to draw inspiration from the work of the Italian architectural painter Viviano Codazzi who had been influenced himself by the work of the Flemish and Dutch genre painters active in Rome known as the Bamboccianti who also painted architectural scenes with figures. There are some important differences with the works of these artists. Unlike them, Saey typically depicted imaginary buildings rather than the more realistic architectural or city views of Codazzi and the Bamboccianti. Saey's figures are not the common people of Rome going about their daily business preferred by the Bamboccianti, but rather elegant persons, often wearing exotic garb who are participating in some courtly or artistic activity.

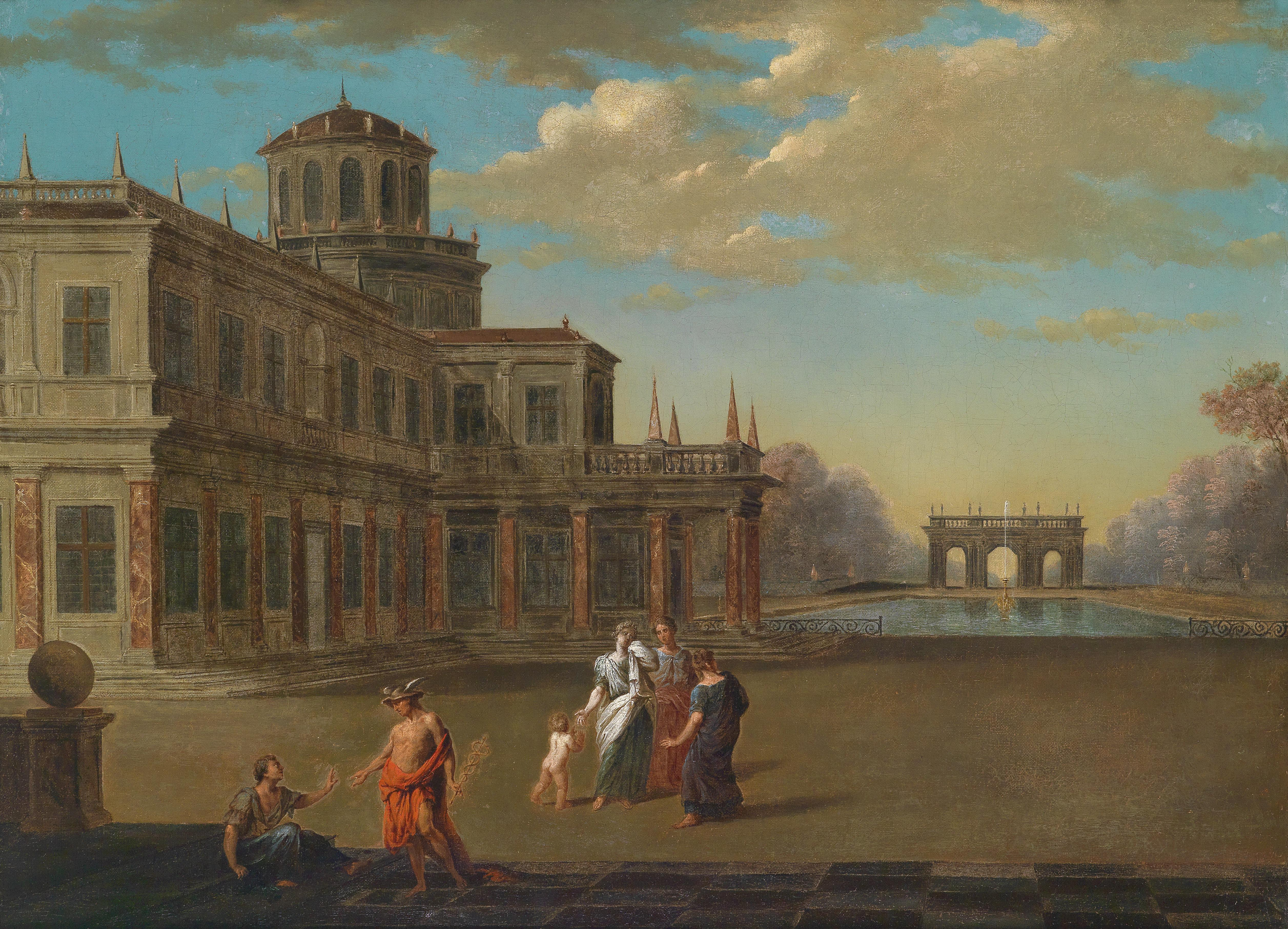
Baroque palace with Hermes delivering a message

Some of Saey's architectural scenes appear to represent subjects from mythology or the bible while others may simply represent some entertainment or story involving fantastic figures imagined by the artist. For example, his Baroque palace with Hermes delivering a message (at Dorotheum sale of 12 December 2011, Vienna, lot 25) depicts a mythological scene while his Solomon and the Queen of Sheba (Lempertz sale of 20 May 2017, Cologne, lot 1103) depicts a biblical scene. Some works appear to be related to the extraordinary events in the life of Cleopatra. This could be the case with the Picnic in a palace courtyard (At Jean Moust in 2018), which possibly depicts a picnic of Cleopatra and Mark Antony. Other works, such as the Perspective view of an Italian palace animated with figures and gallant celebrations (possibly 1690, Musee des beaux-arts de Valenciennes), do not appear to depict a specific story. The picture shows elegant figures on a terrace before a palatial building watching a dance performance by a black dancer holding a red macaw with open wings on his arm. He holds two dogs on a leash who appear to be running in step. Two musicians are playing string instruments on the terrace on the right while the spectators are sitting underneath a balustrade on the right.

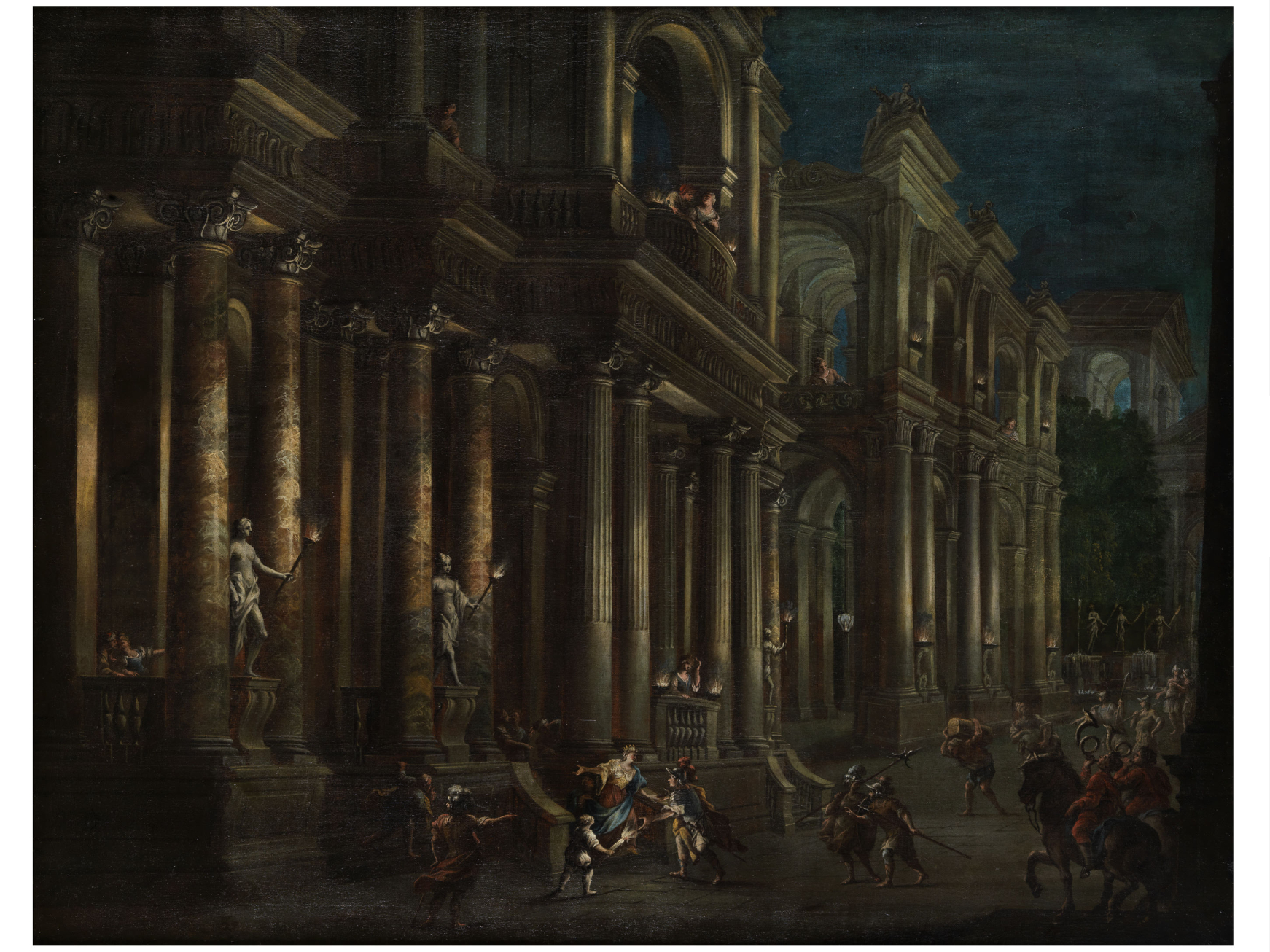
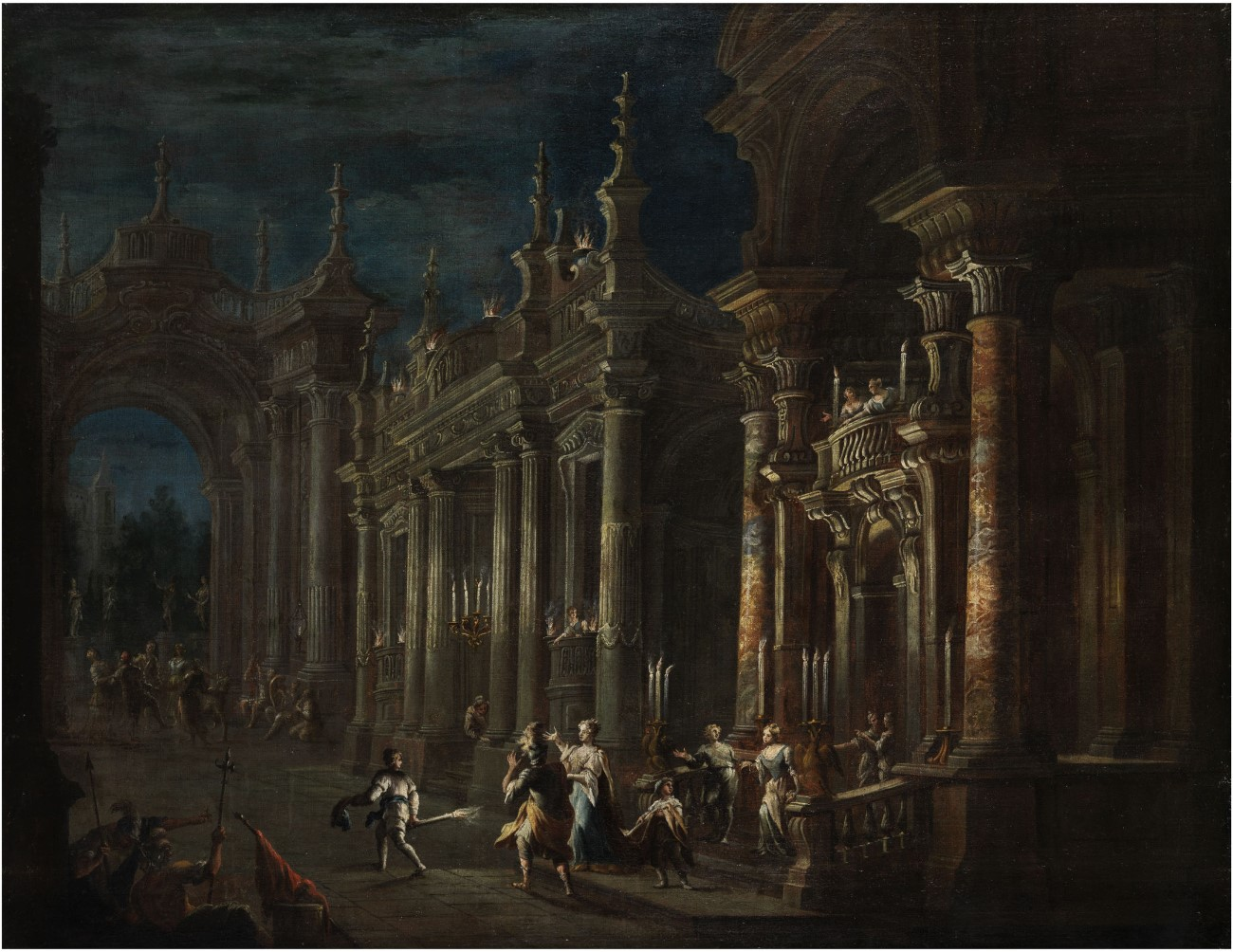
Palace architecture with nocturnal illumination and numerous figures

That his works are principally aimed at impressing the viewer through their technical feats of architectural perspective, the dramatic lighting and the mysterious scenes with fantastic figures is evident in the pair of paintings depicting palace architecture with nocturnal illumination and numerous figures (Auctioned at Hampel on 28 September 2017, Cologne, lot 739). Both compositions in large format (119 x 147 cm) depict a monumental portico in front of which an elegant company is gathered. They were designed as counterparts to be displayed side by side. The extremely lavish palace architectures are placed respectively on the left and right in each composition and disappear in the distance with foreshortening at the rear. The round fluted columns in stained marble with various capitals, cornices and balconies are illuminated by artificial light emanating from torches, which are held by stone statues and vases as well as persons holding lighted torches. The scene in the composition to be hung on the left may refer to the story of the arrival of the Queen of Sheba who is standing with her crown on the stairs while servants are carrying luggage and treasure boxes. The meaning of the second work is not yet understood.

A composition by Saeys in the collection of the Louvre referred to as the Hunting meal differs from his other work in that it depicts an elegant company in a landscape rather than in front of an imaginary palace.
