= Jan Baptist Boel the Younger =

Flemish painter

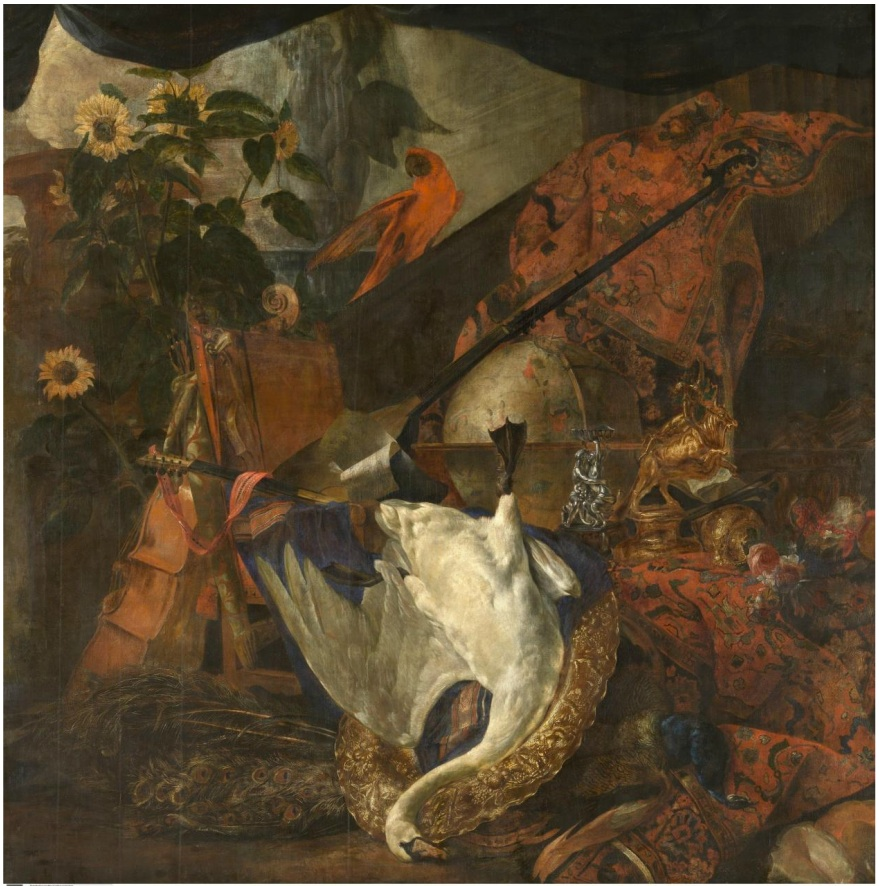
Vanitas

Jan Baptist Boel or Jan Baptist Boel the Younger (between September 1643 and 4 October 1643–9 January 1689) was a Flemish painter who specialised in still lifes and animal paintings. He collaborated with other painters in Antwerp for whom he added the still life elements or animals to their compositions.

== Life ==
He was born into a family of artists in Antwerp. He was the son of the still life and animal painter Pieter Boel and Maria Blanckaert. His brother Balthasar-Lucas Boel also became a painter. His uncle was the engraver Quirin Boel the Younger.

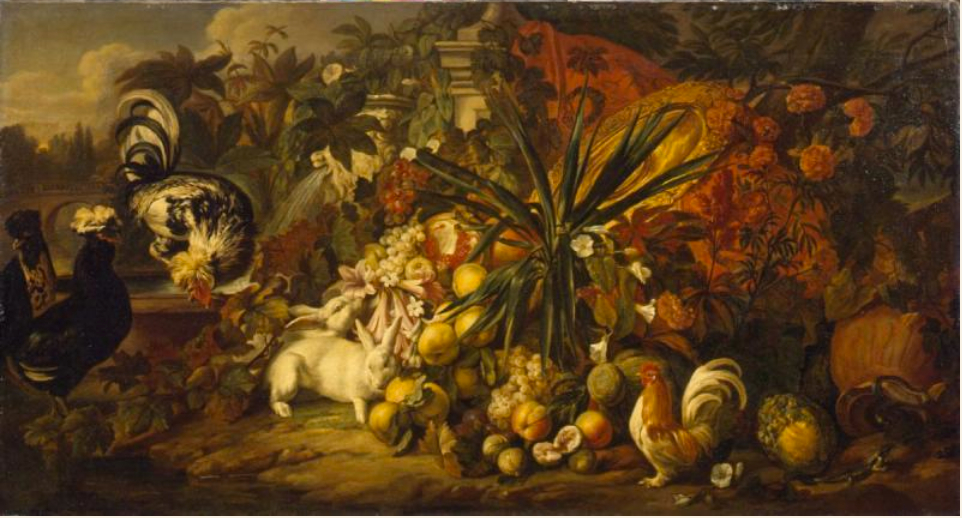
Still life with roosters and rabbits

His teacher was his father Pieter Boel. His father specialised in lavish still lifes and animal paintings. The family moved to Paris in 1668, where Pieter Boel worked in the Gobelins Manufactory and became a painter to the king. Pieter Boel played an important role in revolutionizing animal painting by working directly from live animals in a natural setting.

Jan Baptist Boel had moved back to Antwerp before the death of his father in 1674. He married Maria Catharina Immenraet, the daughter of landscape painter Philips Augustijn Immenraet, in Antwerp Cathedral on 4 May 1675. The couple had three sons and three daughters.

In 1675 Jan Baptist Boel registered in the Antwerp Guild of Saint Luke as a master. Five years later he painted a large still life for the 'Schilderskamer' of the Antwerp Guild in order to obtain an exemption from Guild duties in the future.

On 14 September 1687 Jan Baptist and his wife were recorded as seriously ill and making their wills. His wife died the same day while the artist himself died on 1 January 1689 in Antwerp.

== Work ==
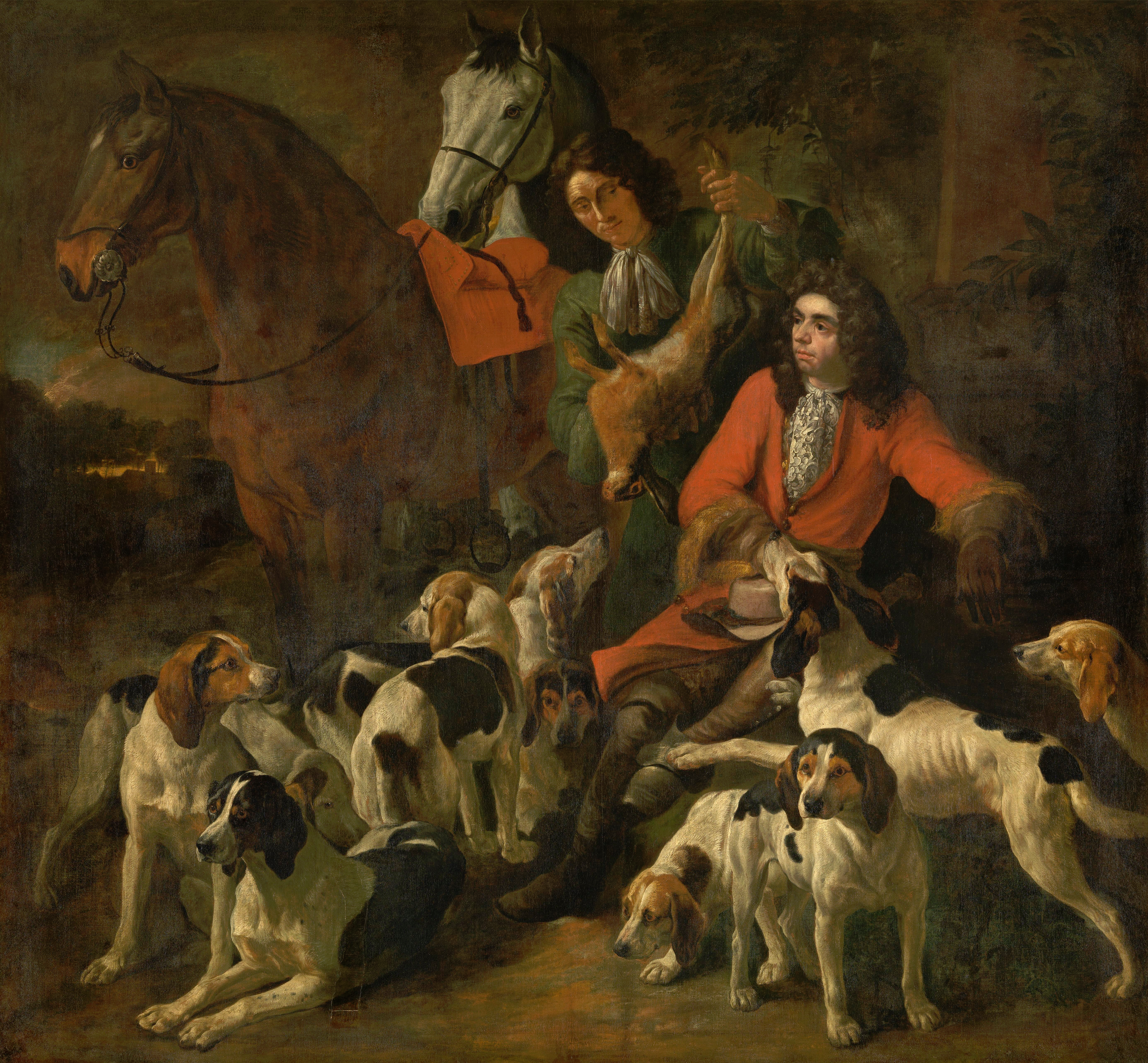
Return from the hunt, with Theodoor Boeyermans

Jan Baptist Boel's known oeuvre is very limited. He principally painted pronkstillevens, vanitas paintings and animals.

He is known to have collaborated with other specialist painters. A collaboration with Theodoor Boeyermans on the painting Return from the hunt is documented. In this hunting scene Jan Baptist Boel painted the dogs while Theodoor Boeyermans was responsible for the figures.
