= Hendrik van Minderhout =

Dutch painter (1632–1696)

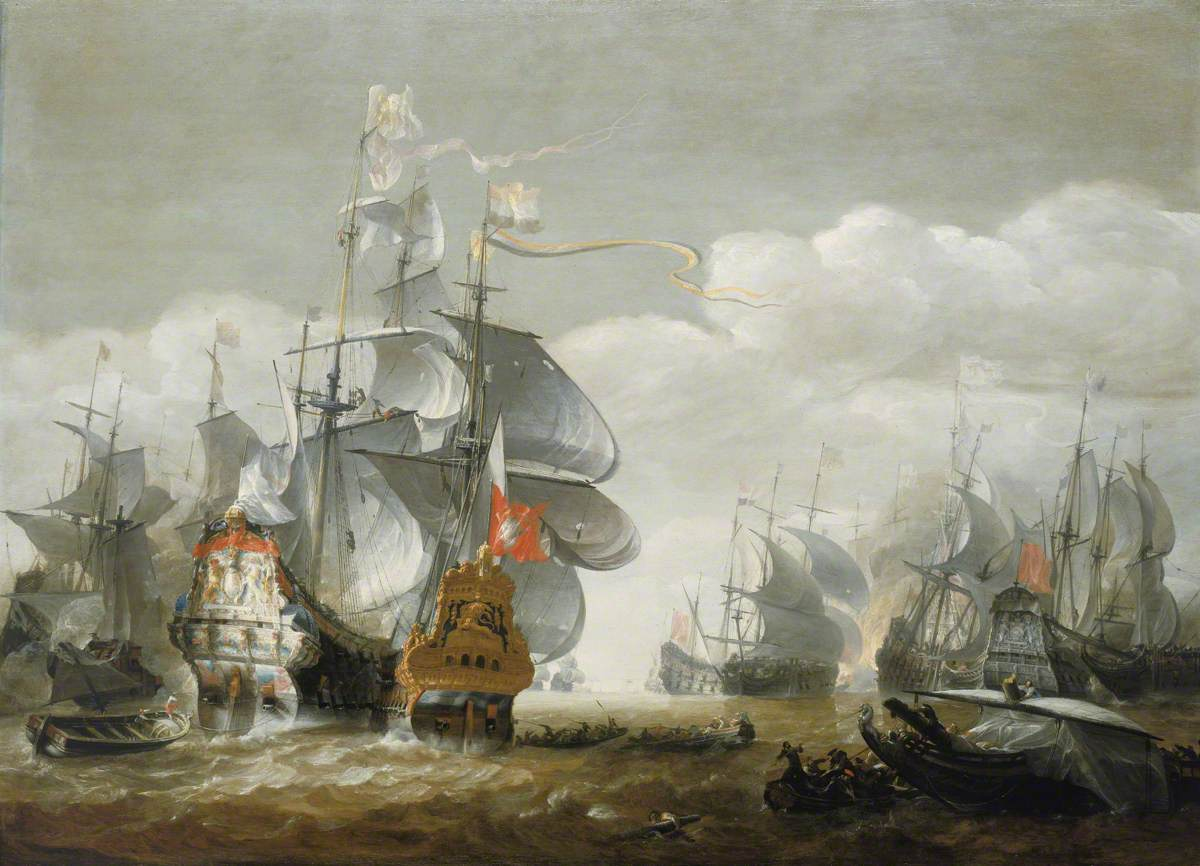
The Battle of Lowestoft, c. 1665

Hendrik van Minderhout (1632 – 22 July 1696) was a Dutch-born artist who was primarily active in the Flemish cities Bruges and Antwerp. He painted marine paintings, harbor scenes, cityscapes, landscapes and architectural paintings. He also collaborated as a staffage painter with Flemish landscape and perspective painters.

== Life ==
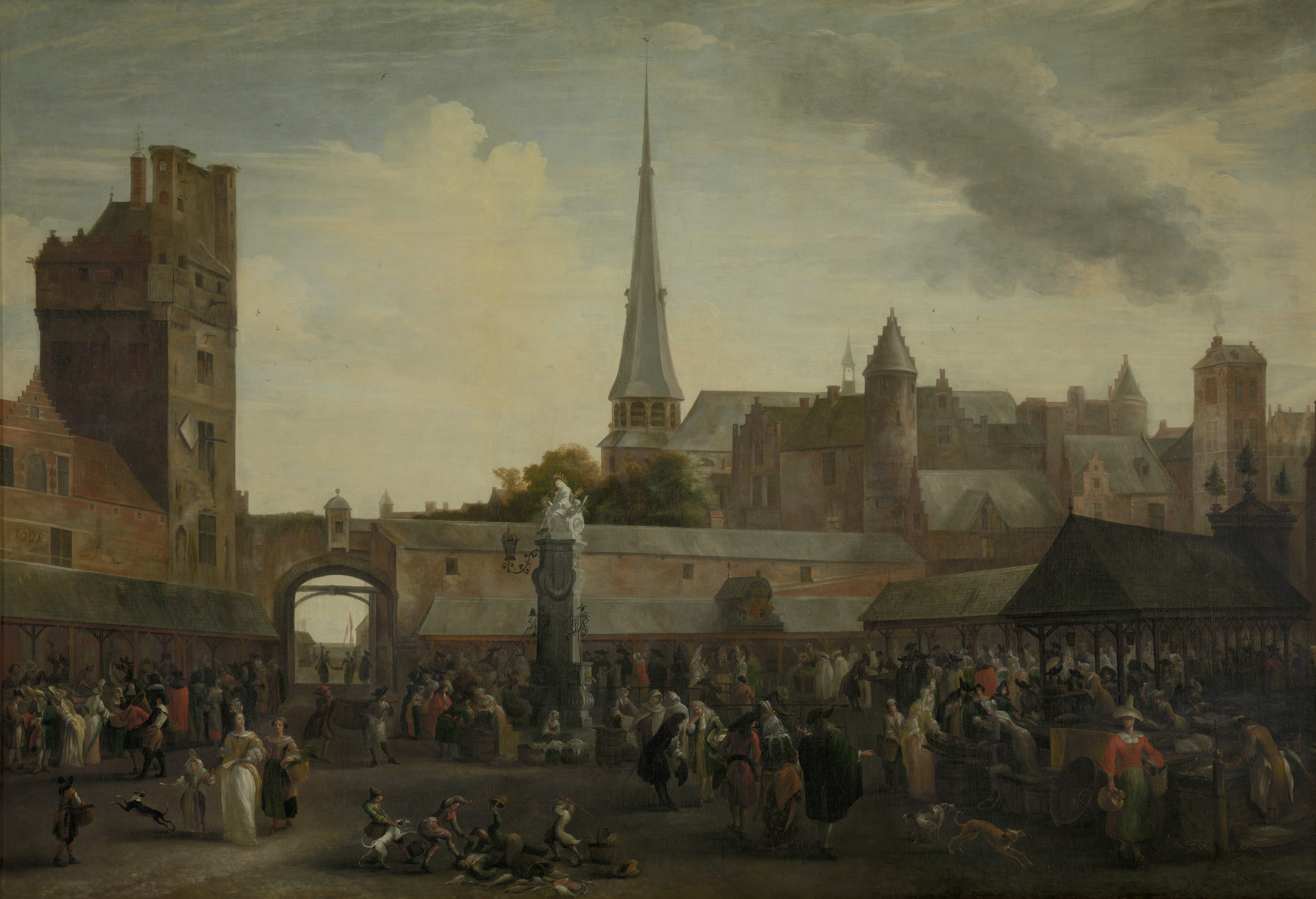
Fish market in Antwerp

Minderhout was born in Rotterdam. He should not be confused with the Rotterdam landscape painter Minderhout named 'den groenen Ridder'. He arrived in Bruges in 1652. He may have spent time in Italy in 1653. In 1663, he joined Bruges' Guild of Saint Luke. Subsequently, from 1672 until his death in 1696, van Minderhout lived in Antwerp where he became a member of the local Guild of Saint Luke. He paid three guilders and painted a large canvas of an oriental port to Antwerp's guild to be exempted from any guild duties including the obligation to serve as the deacon of the Guild.

In 1673, he married his second wife, Anna-Victoria Claus. The couple had five children, of whom two, Antoon (26 Sept 1675 – 22 Dec 1705) and Willem Augustin (28 Aug 1680 – 31 June 1752), became painters.

He was the master of his son Willem Augustin, Lucas Smout the Younger, Jacob Balthasar Peeters and Nicolas de Veckere.

He died in Antwerp.

== Work ==
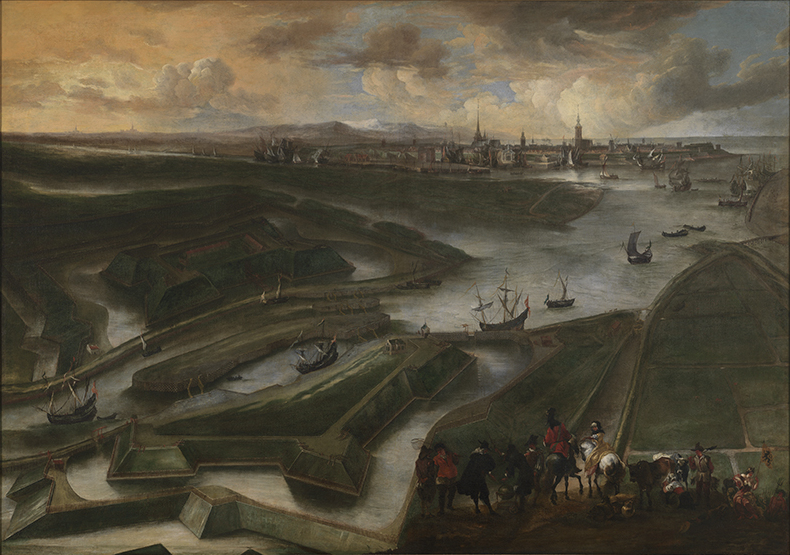
View of Ostend

Hendrik van Minderhout mainly painted large views of seas and harbours and marine battles. He also created cityscapes, landscapes and architectural paintings. His subjects included realist views such as of the ports of Antwerp, Ostend and Bruges, as well as imaginary views of Mediterranean and oriental ports. It has been suggested that the wide variety of works bearing the signature Hendrik van Minderhout points to the existence of two artists of the same name who were active at the same time.

His later marine works are comparable to that of the Dutch seascape painter Willem van de Velde the Younger.

Van Minderhout was appreciated as a staffage painter by his Antwerp colleagues. He contributed the figures to works by local landscape and perspective painters including Wilhelm Schubert van Ehrenberg and Jacob Balthasar Peeters.
