= Philips Augustijn Immenraet =

Flemish painter

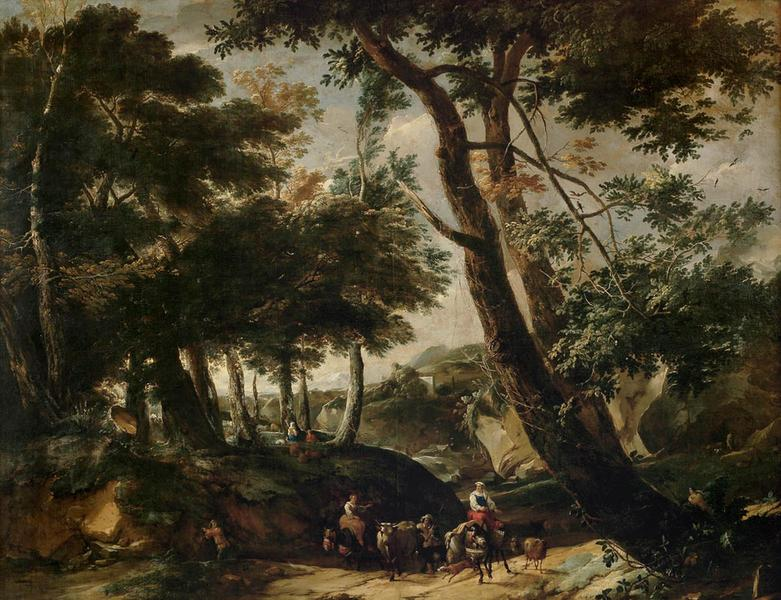
Landscape

Philips Augustijn Immenraet (21 February 1627 – 25 September 1679) was a Flemish landscape painter and engraver. While staying largely within the traditional scheme of the Flemish Baroque landscape, Immenraet introduced a new brightness and broke with the traditional compositional scheme of obliquely receding planes. His best works already display a pre-Romantic character.

== Life ==
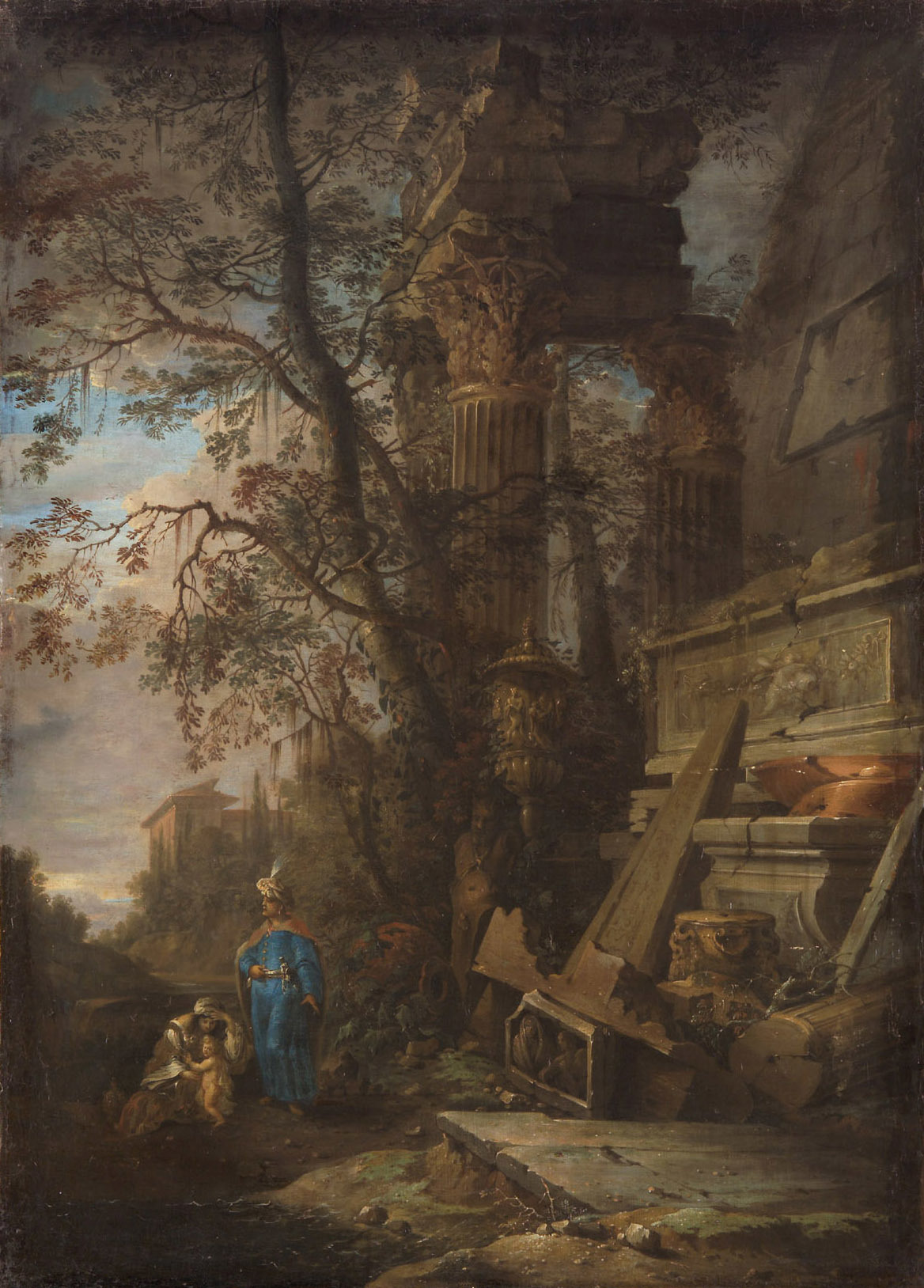
The Repudiation of Hagar

He was born in Antwerp as the son of a German piano builder who had immigrated to Antwerp. His brother was the painter Michael Angelo Immenraet. In 1641–1642 Philips Augustijn was registered in the Antwerp Guild of Saint Luke as a pupil of Lucas van Uden, a landscape painter.

It is possible that he travelled to Italy at the age of 18 and resided there from 1645 to 1655. Upon his return to Antwerp he became a master of the Antwerp Guild of Saint Luke.

He married Catharina de Hille. Their sons were Michel Angelo II, Philips Augustijn II and Andries. They also had a daughter Maria-Catherina who married the painter Jan Baptist Boel.

Immenraet's pupils included his son Andries and Pieter Rijsbraeck. Philips Augustijn Immenraet died in Antwerp in 1679.

== Work ==
Philips Augustijn Immenraet is known for his landscapes. While his landscapes are usually in the Italianate style he also painted wooded landscapes that are reminiscent of the works of Cornelis Huysmans and "The Sonian Forest Painters" such as Jacques d'Arthois. Immenraet is regarded as a member the group of pseudo-classicist to which Huysmans also belonged. His landscapes typically contain small figures of herders or of a religious or mythological scene.

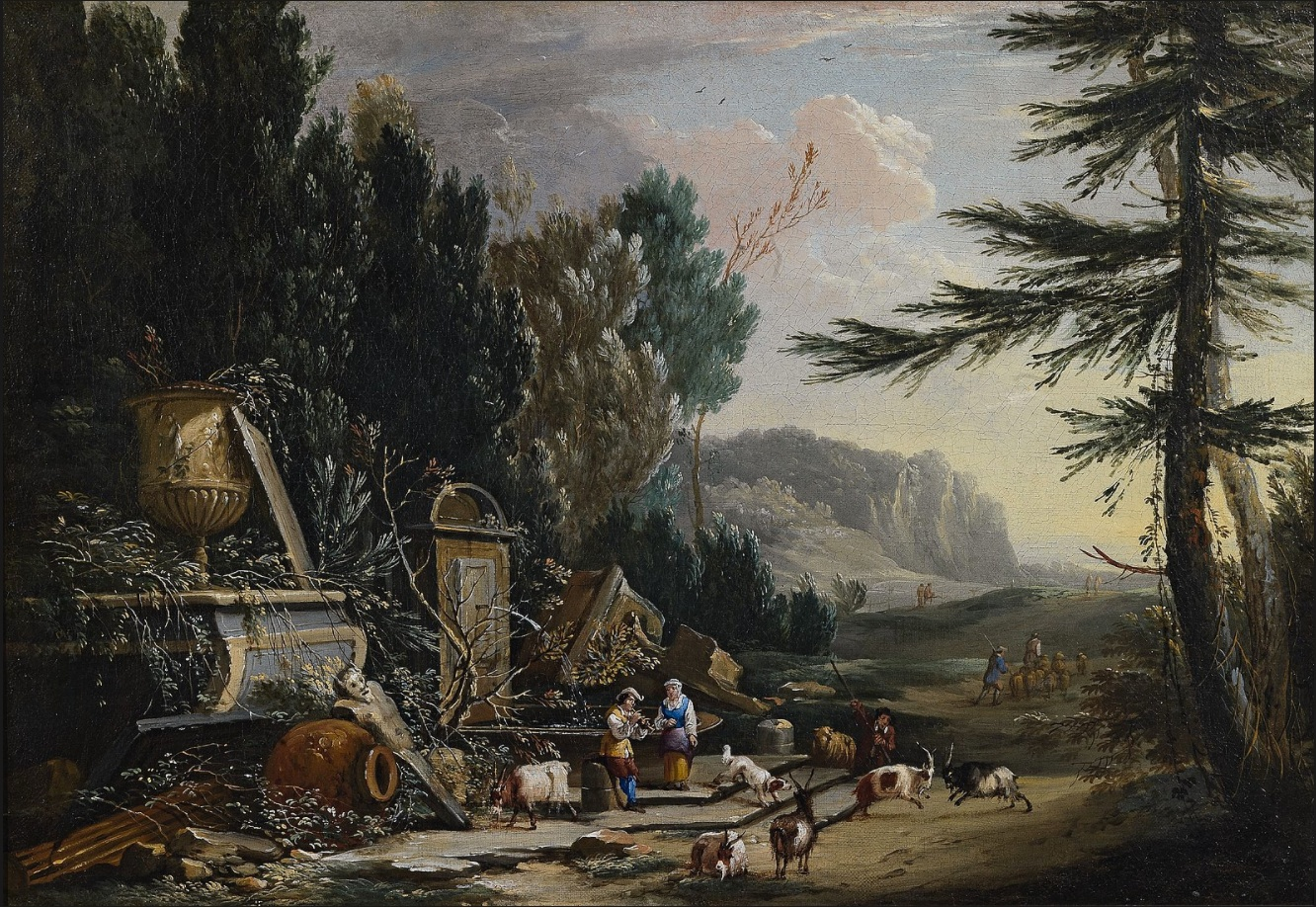
Landscape with Herders and Ruins

As was the custom in artistic production at the time, Immenraet often collaborated with other specialist painters in the creation of a composition. Immenraet would paint the landscape while the other specialist painters would take care of other aspects of the painting such as staffage, architecture, animals or still life elements. A collaboration with Erasmus Quellinus II is reported by the Dutch biographer Arnold Houbraken. The Royal Museums of Fine Arts of Belgium holds the 1672 painting The Legend of William Tell shown to the Antwerp Guild of St Sebastian, which is a collaboration between Immenraet, Wilhelm Schubert van Ehrenberg (who painted the architecture) and Karel-Emmanuel Biset. He also worked with Nicolas Robert on the painting Cartouche with floral decoration and two parrots around a landscape, with Immenraet painting the landscape and Robert the surrounding cartouche (private collection).

Immenraet was also active as an engraver. He produced a series of 8 etchings of landscapes after the work of his teacher Lucas van Uden, which were published by the Antwerp publisher Frans van den Wyngaerde.
