= Gillis Neyts =

Flemish painter

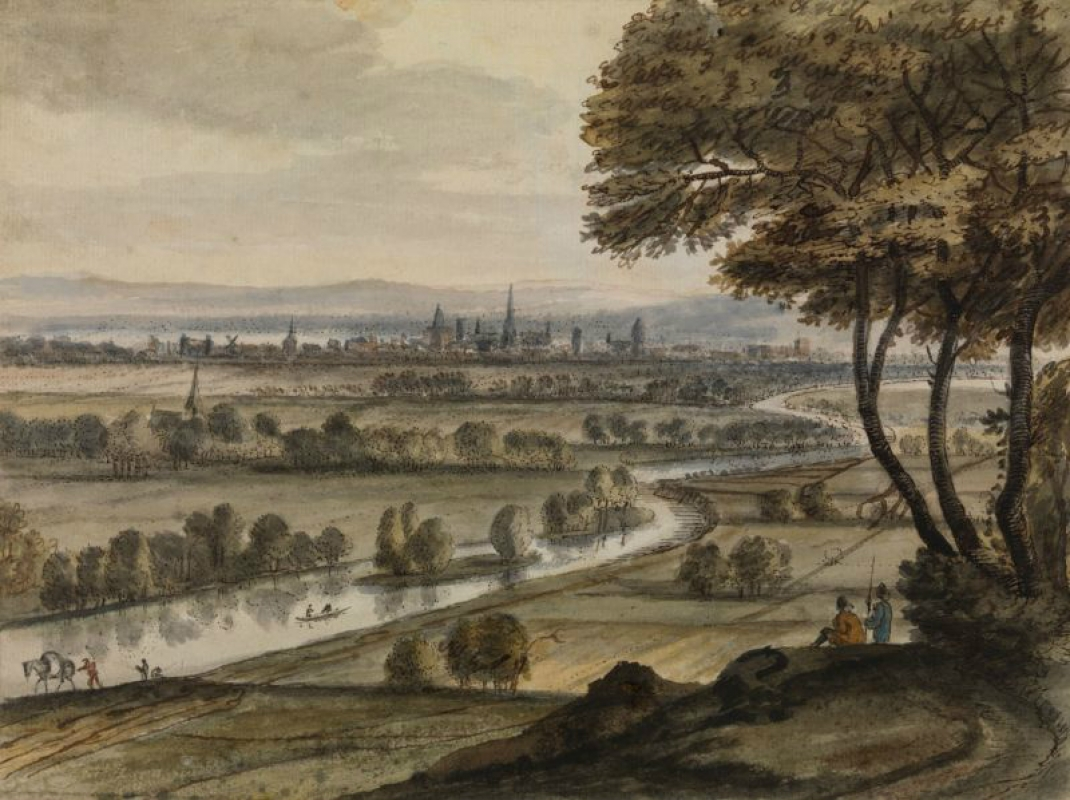
River landscape with a town in the distance

Gillis Neyts or Aegidius Neyts (1618 or 1623–1678) was a Flemish painter, draughtsman and engraver. He was a landscape artist who is now mainly known for his italianising and topographical drawings of sites throughout the Southern Netherlands. He was a less prolific painter of landscapes and also produced a number of landscape prints. He further left a great number of figure studies.

== Life ==
The location and date of his birth are not known with certainty. It is likely that he was born in Ghent where he was baptized on 4 May 1623. However, there is also a record in Namur dated 10 June 1665, in which he is listed as a native of Overijse. An album with drawings mentions him as a native of Lille.

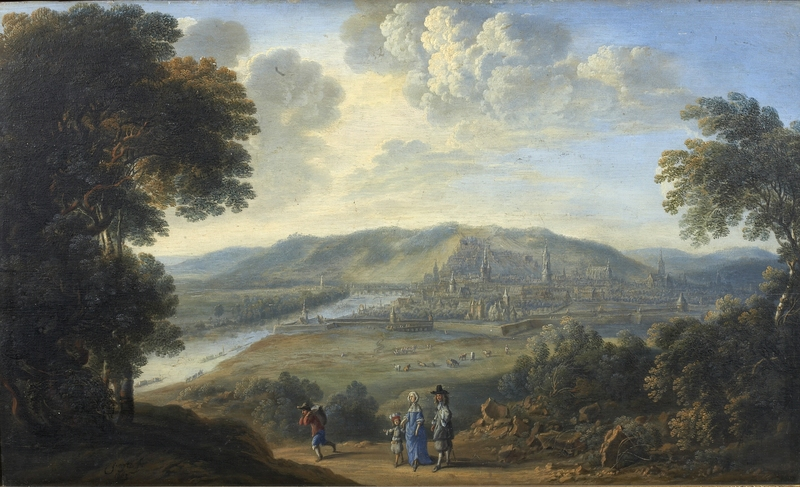
View of Namur

It is not clear with whom he trained. Some scholars mention as a possible teacher the Antwerp painter, draftsman and printmaker Lucas van Uden since some of Neyts' landscape paintings reflect van Uden's style. However, there is no evidence for this presumed pupilage. In 1643 he was living in Antwerp where he married Clara de la Porte. The couple had two daughters and a son. In 1647 he was registered in the Guild of Saint Luke in Antwerp as a master painter and engraver. In 1650 he spent some time in Dortrecht. In the year 1653 he may have made a trip to Spain as it is known he made plans to do so.

From 1662 he is known to have been active in the Meuse valley around Namur and Huy where he made many studies of the landscapes. In 1665 he is registered as a poorter of Namur. He enjoyed the patronage of the local monasteries. He collaborated with Jacques Nicolaï who painted the figures in 18 landscapes commissioned by the Church of the convent of Croisiers in Namur. He travelled widely throughout the Meuse region and portrayed its cities, steep-banked valleys, imposing castles, ruins, rivers and luxuriant forests. He probably worked in Lille in the late 1670s. Based on a drawing of Antwerp, he is believed to have returned to Antwerp around 1680. He remained there until his death around 1687, the year in which the register of the Guild of Saint Luke mentions the payment of his death debt. He was buried in the Antwerp Cathedral.

== Work ==
=== General ===
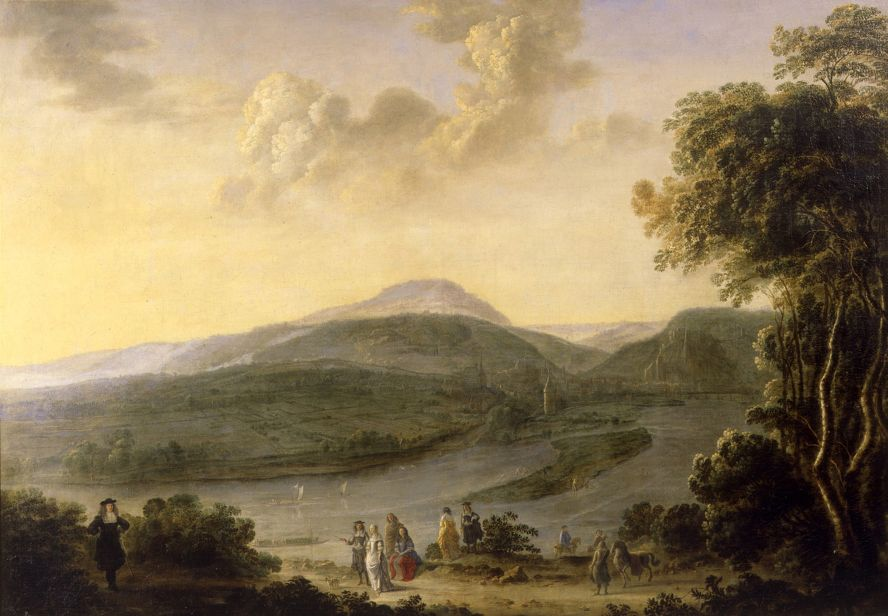
Meuse valley with the city of Huy in 1663

While in his early career Gillis Neyts produced some religious and mythological paintings, the vast majority of his later output was as a landscape artist. His subjects are either imaginary, idealised panoramas or topographical views of towns and villages. He often placed figures in his landscapes to animate the foreground or the composition. Even his works on religious themes were landscapes with small devotional figures included. Many of his figure studies have been preserved. He also produced a number of harbour views with ships.

Neyts was able to develop his landscapes with infinite variation in both technique and scale. The paintings and drawings are characterized by the high quality of their execution and a constant desire to translate the peaceful atmosphere of the regions he visited. A large portion of his output consists of drawings and to a lesser extent paintings. He made print versions of some of his works.

=== Drawings ===
A great number of his landscape and figure drawings have been preserved and are in the collections of the British Museum, the Louvre, the Frits Lugt Collection in Paris, the Royal Collection and the Rijksmuseum.

Many of the drawings are signed or part of drawing albums. A majority of these drawings are small and executed in brown or black ink with a fine nib. Some of the drawings are on vellum. Neyts was, along with Jan Siberechts and Lucas van Uden, one of the most accomplished artists in the use of both watercolours and bodycolours in his drawings,. His penwork is delicate and characterized by the use of numerous dots and short strokes of the pen, sometimes accompanied by long sinuous meandering lines. Occasionally Neyts added grey wash or watercolour.

Some of the imaginary scenes incorporate distant views of the church spires of Antwerp. Wenceslaus Hollar and the calligraphic style of Jacques Callot were probably influences on his landscape drawings. He is likely to have known these artist's prints rather than their drawings.

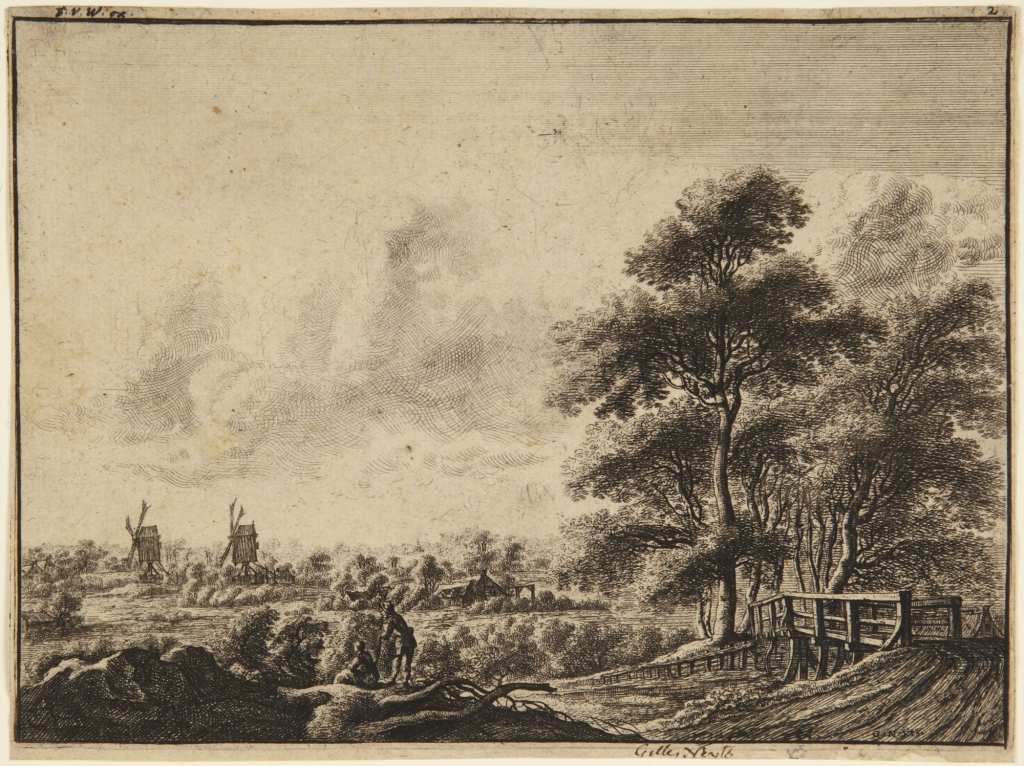
The little bridge

=== Paintings ===
His paintings also depicted imaginary and, less often, real views. They are typically in the blue-green tones characteristic of his Flemish contemporaries such as Lucas van Uden and Gillis Peeters. The compositions are derived from his drawings and his distinctive drawing style is duplicated in his handling of trees and figures.

=== Printmaking ===
Neyts created several etchings, sometimes after his drawings, while other artists used his designs for their own prints. Neyts' prints display the same personal style as his drawings.
