= Hieronymus Janssens =

Flemish genre painter (1624–1693)

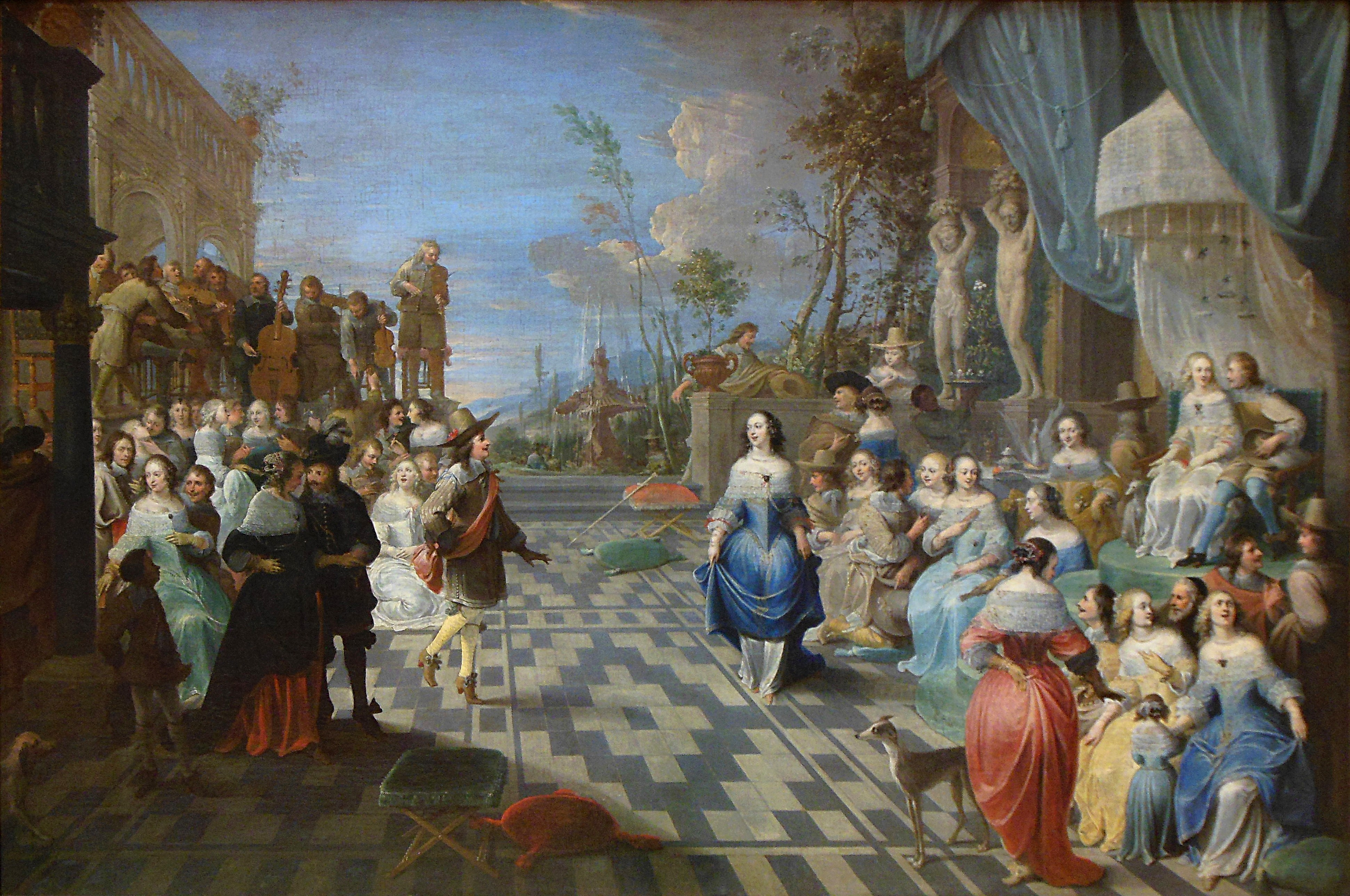
Ball on the terrace of a palace

Hieronymus Janssens or Jeroom Janssens (nicknamed Den danser) (1624, Antwerp – 1693, Antwerp) was a Flemish genre painter known for his compositions depicting elegant companies engaging in dance, music or play, which were of influence on the development of the genre of the conversation piece. He also painted architectural scenes of real or imaginary palaces, churches, temples and art galleries.

== Life ==
He was a student of Christoffel Jacobsz van der Laemen in 1636–1637. He was first registered as a master in the Guild of Saint Luke of Antwerp in 1643–1644.

He married Catharina van Dooren in 1650. He took on four pupils including Jacob Lafosse (III) in 1651–52.

== Work ==
=== Elegant companies ===
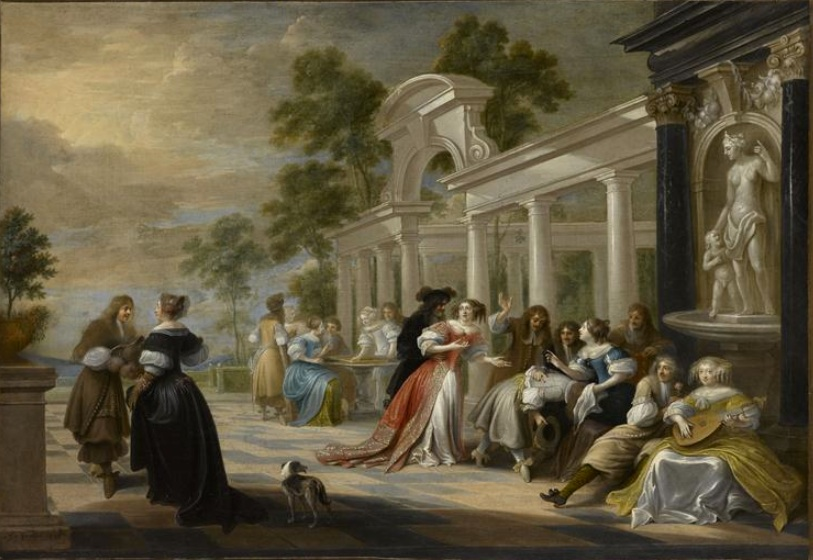
The game of "Main chaude"

Janssens' paintings are often both signed and dated, with dates ranging from 1646 to 1661. Like his teacher van der Laemen he was specialized in dance scenes, set inside a house or on an outside terrace. This is where he got the nickname Den danser or The dancer. These works contributed to the development of the genre of the conversation piece in the Low Countries. His representations of elegant companies and balls and the works of Peter Paul Rubens, in particular his Garden of Love (Prado Museum), were significant for the formation of the genre. In this last work, Rubens showed how a garden could be used as a setting for amorous dalliance and courtship.

One of Hieronymus Janssens' dance pieces depicts King Charles II of England dancing with his sister Mary of Orange at a ball in The Hague during the period of his exile.

Some of his elegant company scenes such as The Prodigal Son Dining with a Music-Making Party and the Elegant company depict persons engaging in excessive drinking and apparently dissolute behaviour and ostensibly carry a moralistic message.

=== Architectural works ===
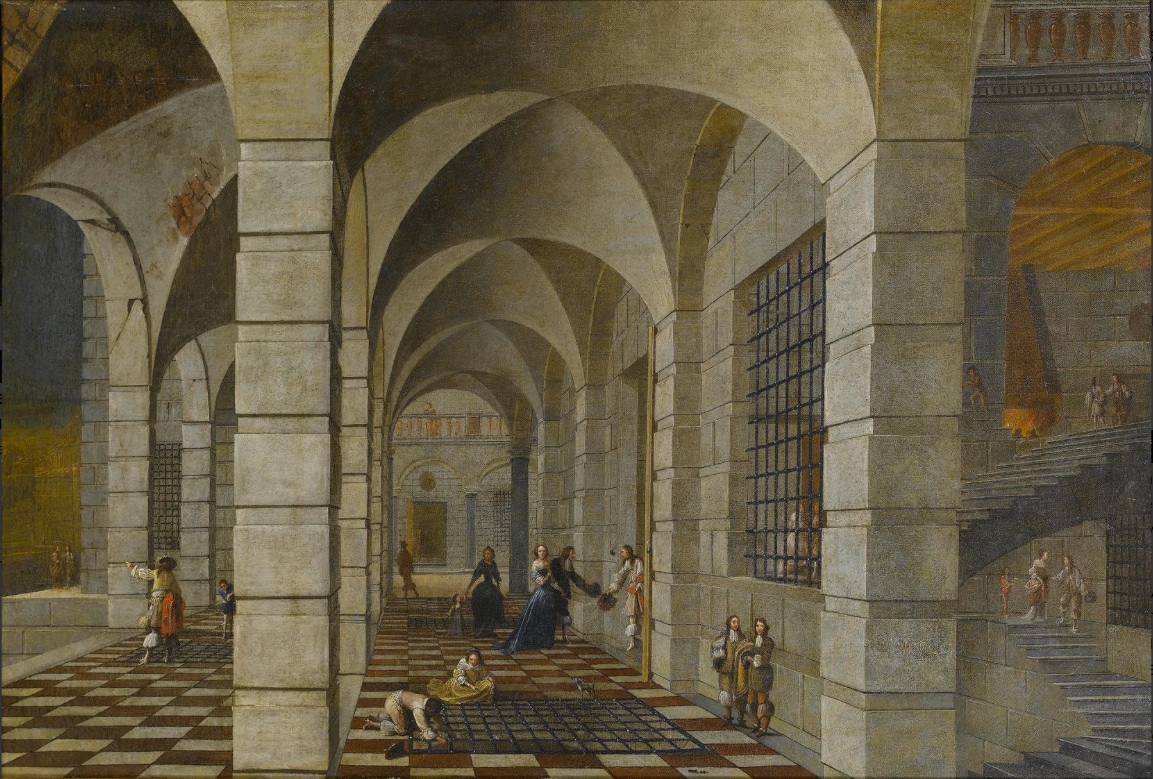
Dungeon interior with elegant figures, with Wilhelm Schubert van Ehrenberg

Janssens also painted many architectural paintings usually of imaginary palaces, temples and art galleries. He based himself on existing buildings, including the house of Rubens in Antwerp, as well as on prints of Hans Vredeman de Vries, which were a source of perspectival effects. Playing with elements such as columns, pilasters and windows he created imaginary, monumental constructions. The architectural features with their perspectival exaggeration as well as the use of chiaroscuro created a dramatic effect in Janssens' work.

He frequently painted these works in collaboration with other artists such as Dirck van Delen, Wilhelm Schubert van Ehrenberg and Jacobus Ferdinandus Saey.

=== Gallery paintings ===
Janssens contributed to the genre of the 'gallery paintings'. The 'gallery paintings' genre is native to Antwerp where Frans Francken the Younger and Jan Brueghel the Elder were the first artists to create paintings of art and curiosity collections in the 1620s.

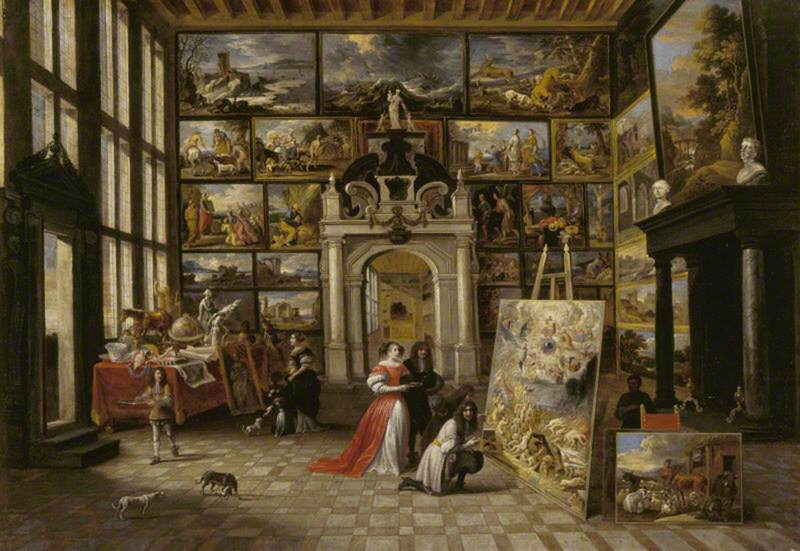
A Picture Gallery with Fashionable Visitors

Gallery paintings depict large rooms in which many paintings and other precious items are displayed in elegant surroundings. The earliest works in this genre depicted art objects together with other items such as scientific instruments or peculiar natural specimens. The genre became immediately quite popular and was followed by other artists such as Jan Brueghel the Younger, Cornelis de Baellieur, Hans Jordaens, David Teniers the Younger, Gillis van Tilborch and Hieronymus Janssens himself.

A good example is the Picture Gallery with Fashionable Visitors (National Trust, Uppark House and Garden, West Sussex) dated to the 1660s. The gallery depicted is an imaginary gallery with three allegorical figures who are admiring a canvas of the 'Last Judgement'. On a table by a window are placed pieces of sculpture, a globe, and other objects. The contrast between the precious objects on the table and the 'Last Judgement' in the foreground illustrates the idea of vanitas: the ultimate vanity of earthly pleasures.

=== Influence ===
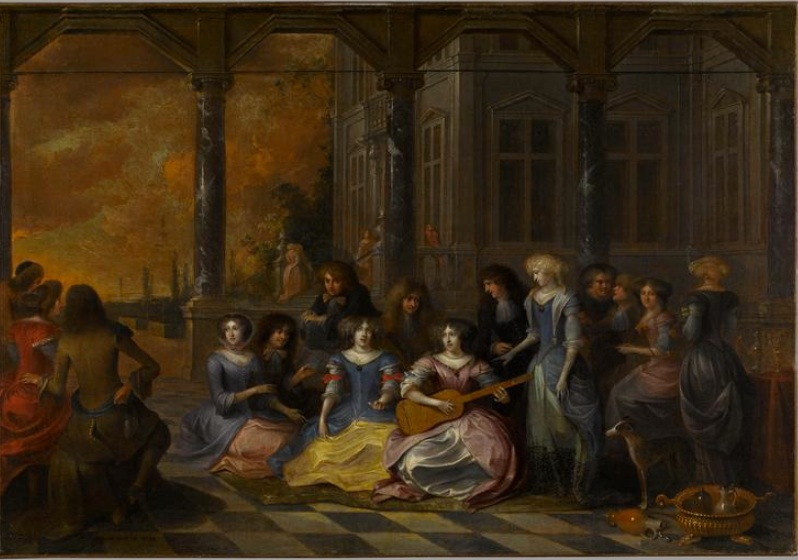
The Concert

His work was of influence on later Flemish genre painters such as Jan Josef Horemans the Younger, whose work Presenting the newborn (current whereabouts unknown) borrowed extensively from Janssens' Ball on the terrace of a palace (Palais des Beaux-Arts de Lille).

== Selected works ==
- 1658: Ball on the terrace of a palace, Palais des Beaux-Arts in Lille.
- 1673: Group of people in the St. Rumbold's Church in Mechelen, painted in collaboration with Willem Schubart von Ehrenberg, The Louvre in Paris.
- Game of Main Chaude or Hot Cockles, The Louvre in Paris.
- A picture gallery with fashionable visitors, Uppark House and Garden, West Sussex
