= Peter Schubart von Ehrenberg =

Austrian painter and stage designer

Peter Schubart von Ehrenberg (born 1668) was a painter and stage designer active in Vienna in the early eighteenth century, and the son of the perspective painter Wilhelm Schubert van Ehrenberg. His known works are ephemeral decorations for courtly celebrations, such as the temporary triumphal arches celebrating the ages of kings and emperors from Charlemagne to Charles VI of Austria (1701–2), and designs for engravings. In 1711 he designed a castrum doloris that was erected in St. Stephen's Cathedral, Vienna for the funeral of Emperor Joseph I.
