= Lucas van Uden =

Flemish painter

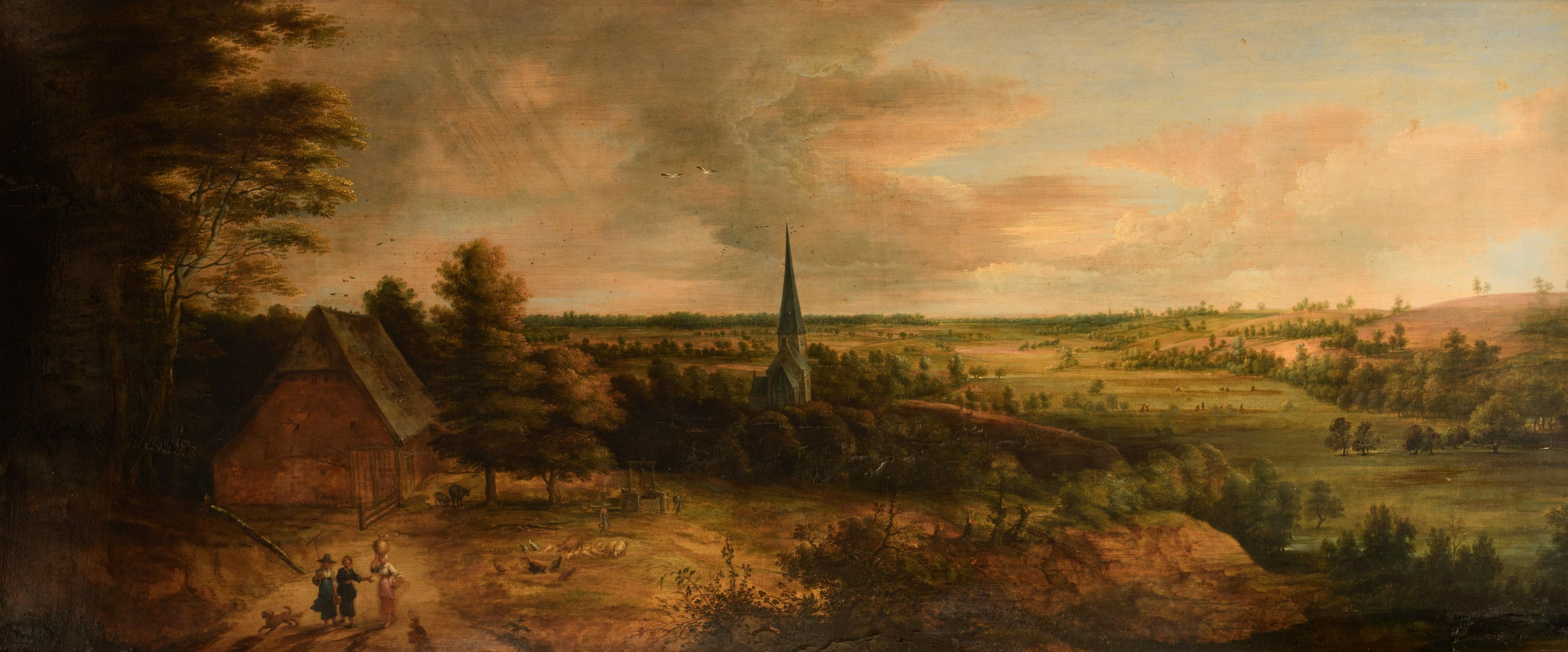
Panoramic landscape with shepherds and peasants

Lucas van Uden (18 October 1595 – 4 November 1672) was a leading Flemish landscape painter, draughtsman and engraver, who lived and worked in Antwerp. He was a leading landscape painter who collaborated with various local figure painters. His most original works are his drawings.

== Life ==
Lucas van Uden was born in Antwerp as the son of Artus van Uden and Joanna Tranoy. His father was Antwerp's city painter, a position which required him to paint the City's buildings and refurbish and gild the statues of the city and the pieces used in the ommegang. Lucas had a brother Jacob who also became a landscape painter. Lucas likely studied with his father as he was never registered with the Guild of Saint Luke as a pupil. He registered only as a master at the Guild in the capacity of a 'wijnmeester' (master's son') in 1626–27 when he was already 32 years old.

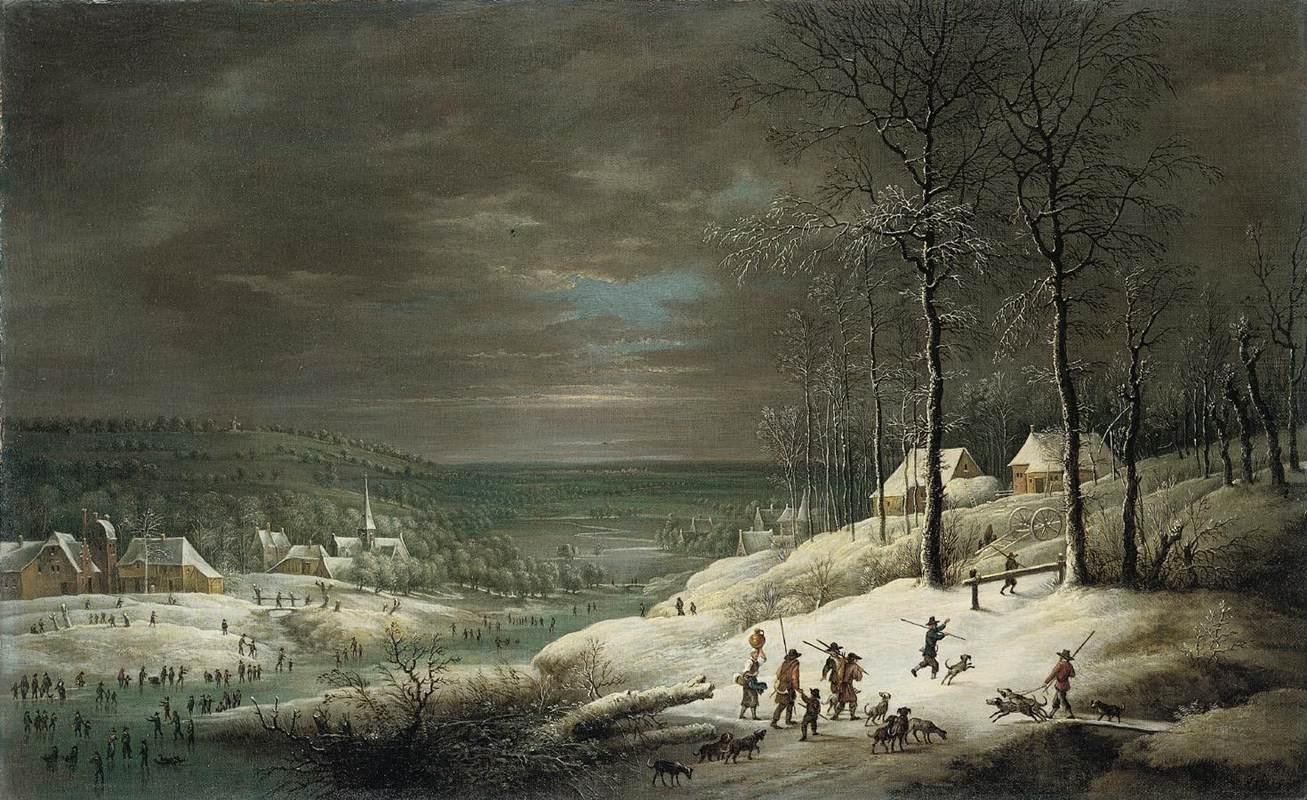
Winter Landscape with Hunters

Lucas had a romantic relationship with Agatha Musson. On 24 October 1620 she gave birth to a son who was named Lucas. On 14 February 1627 Lucas van Uden married Anna van Woelput (died in autumn 1667) with whom he had 8 children, two of whom were born before the couple had married. Lucas had an extramarital child with Willemijntje van den Brande in 1630.

He was active in Antwerp for most of his life except for a period around 1649 when he was recorded as no longer living in the city. He was very successful and could live very comfortably in central Antwerp.

He was the teacher of Jan Baptist Bonnecroy, Philips Augustijn Immenraet and Gillis Neyts. He likely also trained his children. His daughter Maria van Uden became a painter and married the painter Charles Emmanuel Biset. His son Adriaen was also active in Antwerp as a painter.

He died in Antwerp in 1672.

== Work ==
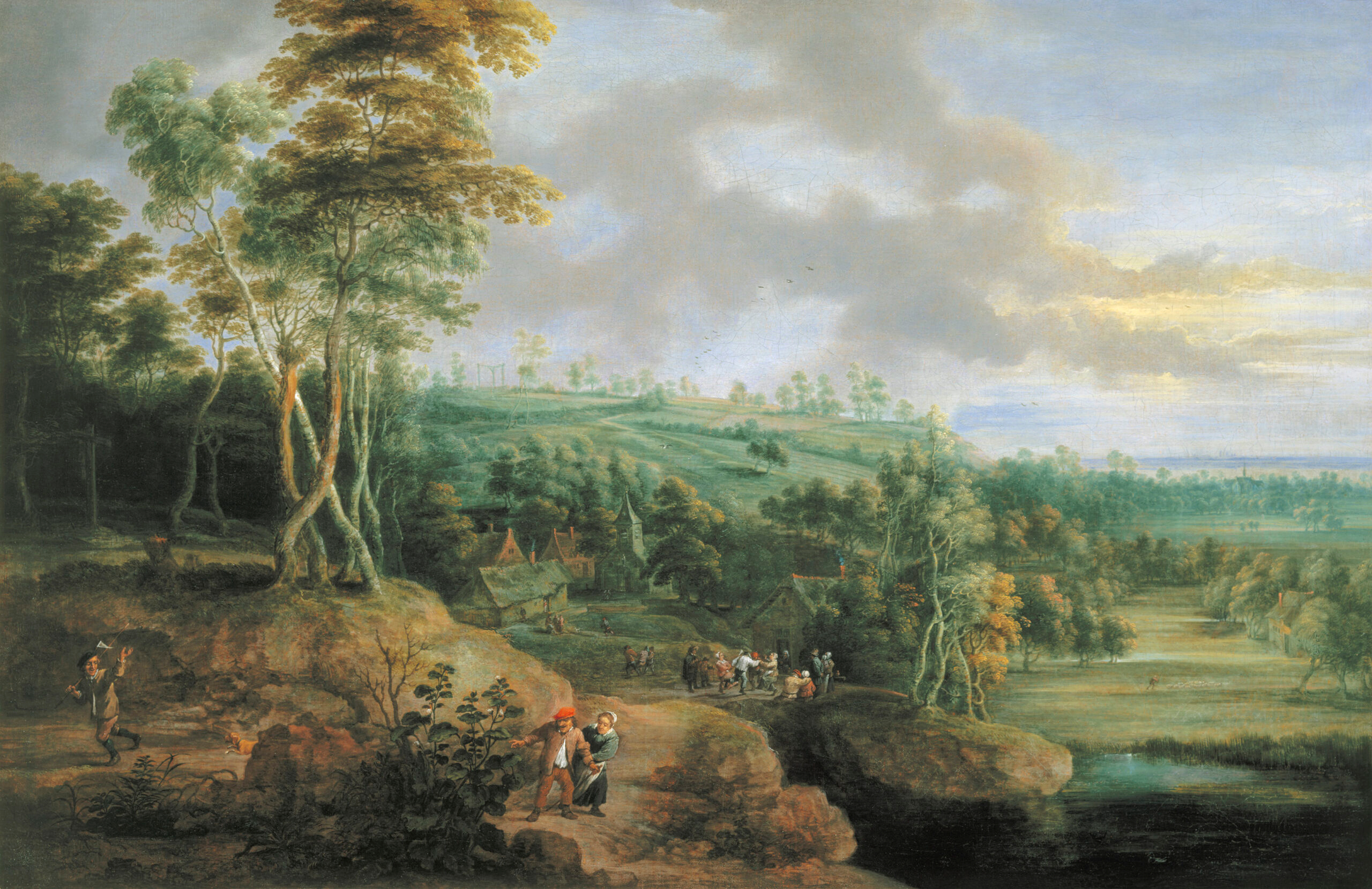
Landscape with a village feast, collaboration with David Teniers the Younger

Lucas van Uden was principally a landscape painter. Some of his landscapes were winter landscapes such as the Winter Landscape with Hunters (private collection).

Although he was never part of Peter Paul Rubens' studio, his works are partly indebted to that leading Antwerp master. His technique with its attention to detail, particularly in his smaller works, and his search for decorative elements in the larger paintings place him in the same tradition as Jan Brueghel the Elder and Joos de Momper. The contrast between areas with dark and cold colours with warm colours in his work also calls to mind the work of Jan Brueghel the Elder and Joos de Momper. General characteristics of is work are a tonally-green recessive view punctuated by slender trees and populated by incidental pastoral and peasant figures. His compositions are usually built up as follows: in the foreground there is a bank with leafy trees, one of which is inclined in order to break the monotony and lead the view of the spectator towards the center of the composition, in which appear as the main motive groups of trees, fields or villages, which are shown cut out against a background of mountains, lacking any dramatic allusion.

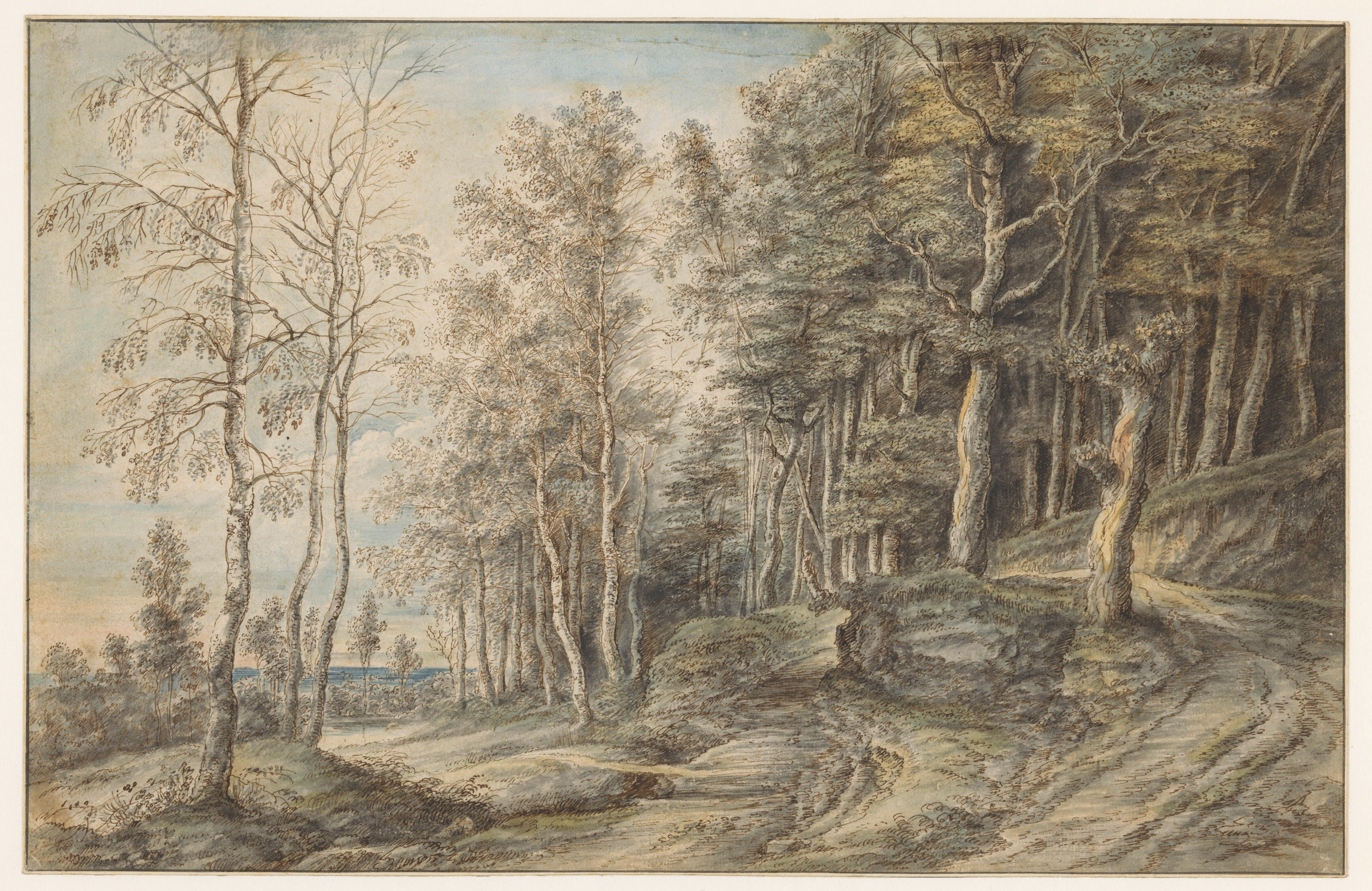
Forest landscape

While his landscape paintings are rather schematic, his drawings which were reportedly made directly from nature are more spontaneous and realistic and display his true talent.

Van Uden is known to have collaborated with David Teniers the Younger and Jan Brueghel the Younger who painted the staffage in his landscapes. An example is the Villagers having a meal (Prado, Madrid), a collaboration with David Teniers the Younger.

Van Uden is often associated with fellow landscape painter Jan Wildens who frequently collaborated with Rubens. However, unlike for Wildens, there is no evidence van Uden ever painted the landscapes for Rubens. Rubens also never added the staffage to van Uden's landscapes. Van Uden made various copies of Rubens' compositions such as the Landscape with a rainbow (Kunsthistorisches Museum), which is a copy of Rubens' Landscape with a rainbow in the Hermitage.

Lucas van Uden produced many etchings some of which are part of the collections of the Rijksmuseum and the British Museum. Some of his designs were also etched by his pupil Philips Augustijn Immenraet.
