= Jacob Balthasar Peeters =

Flemish painter

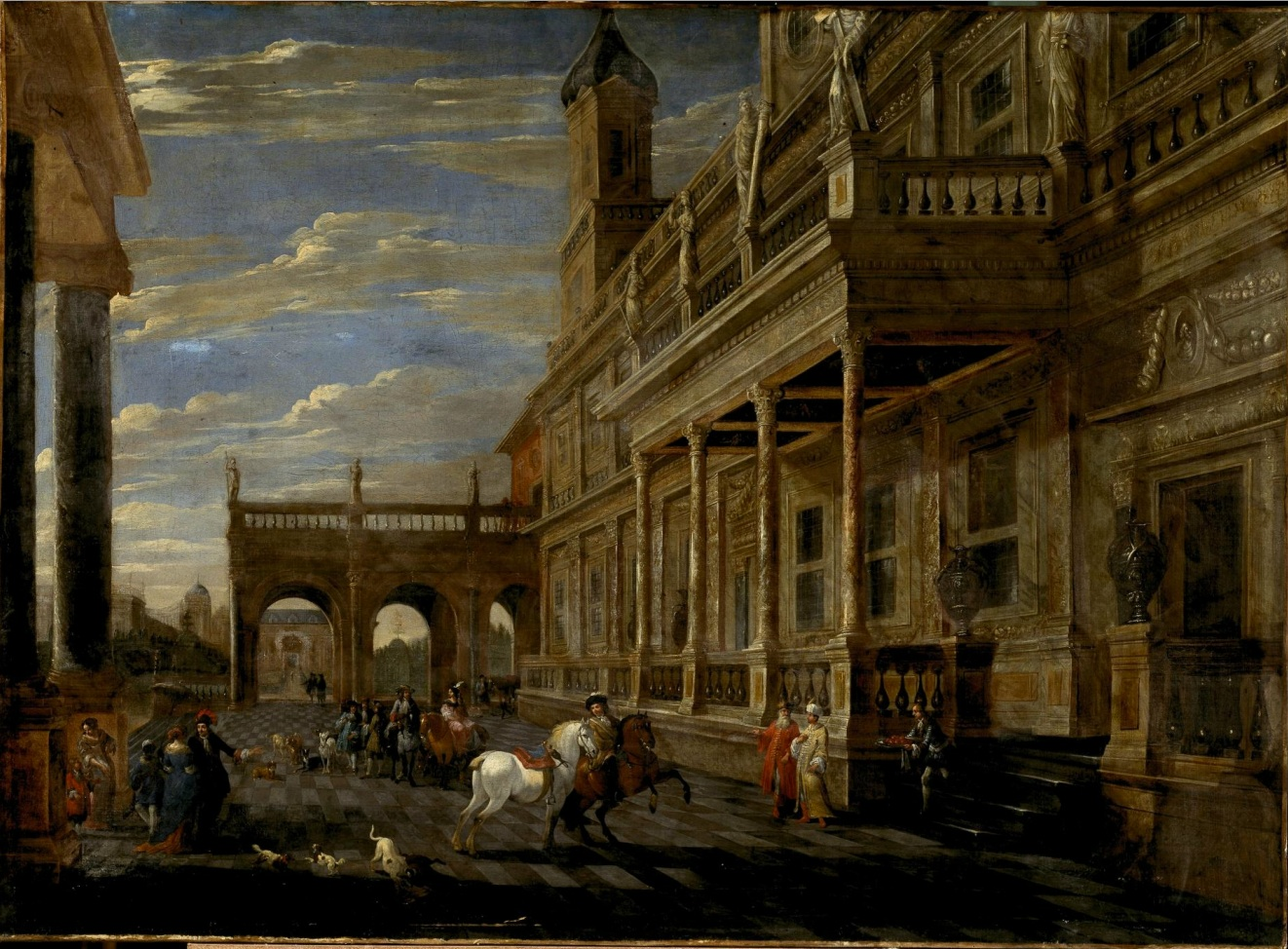
Meeting before falconry

Jacob Balthasar Peeters or Jacob Balthasar Peeters, also known as Jacob Peeters or Jacobus Peeters (Antwerp, 6 January 1661 – 17 December 1732) was a Flemish painter who specialized in architectural paintings depicting imaginary Renaissance and Baroque palaces populated with elegant figures wearing exotic clothes and headgear and shown in theatrical, stage-like postures. Peeters also painted realistic interiors of existing churches with figures.

== Life ==
There has been some confusion about the facts of Jacob Balthasar Peeters' life as the name Jacob or Jacobus Peeters was quite common at the time, and there appears to have been at least one other contemporary Jacobus Peeters who was also a painter active in Antwerp. According to the baptismal register of the parish of Onze-Lieve-Vrouw Zuid (Our Lady South) in Antwerp, he was baptized on 6 January 1661 as the son of Daniel Peeters and Martina Wauters. He was the third of five children and the only son among his sisters Martina, Joanna Maria, Constantia, and Maria. His father was a sculptor who was registered at the Antwerp Guild of Saint Luke as a wijnmeester (son of a master of the guild) in the guild year 1651–1652. His father died when he was only five years old. No family connection to the well-known painters Bonventura and Jan Peeters has been established to date.

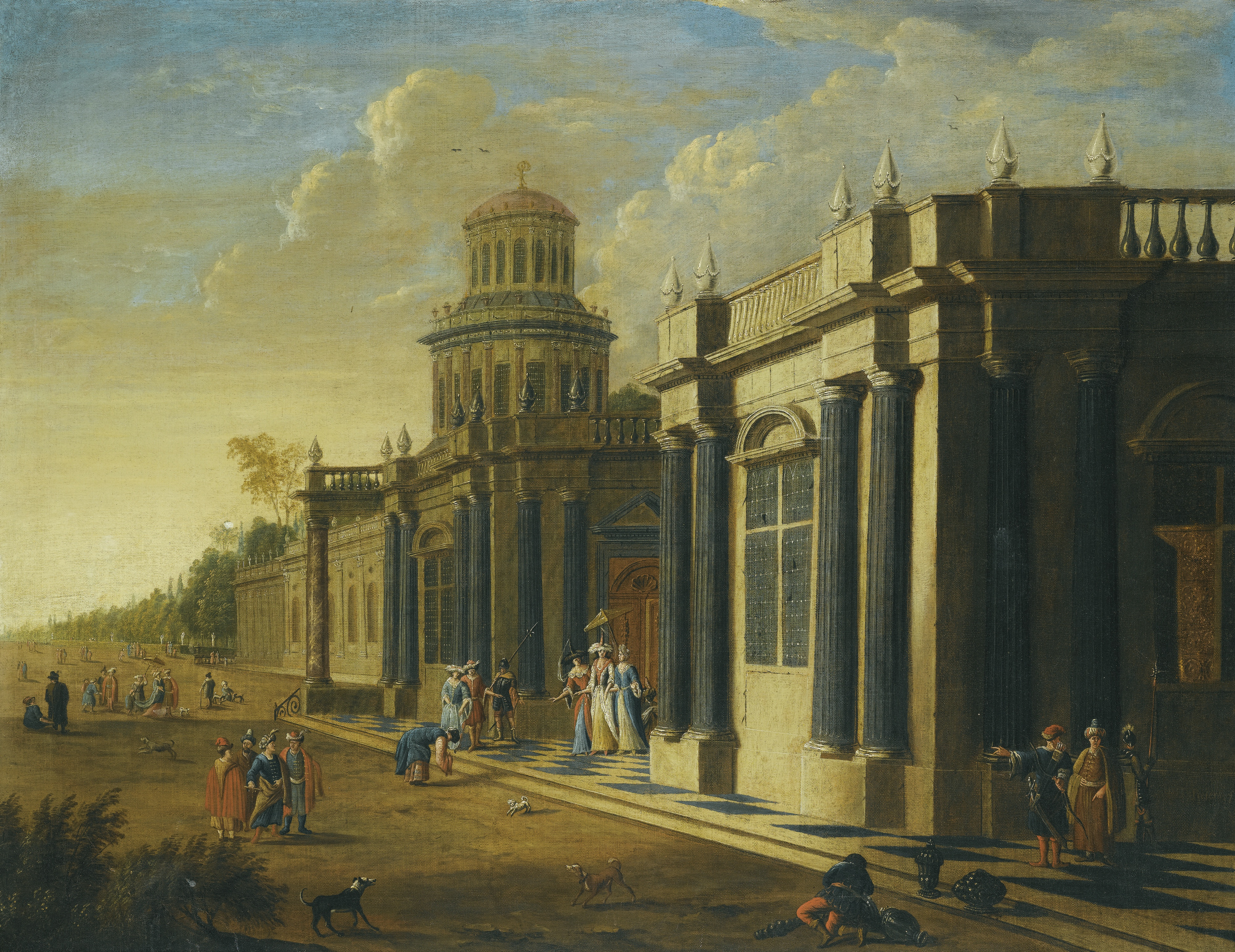
Elegant figures in oriental costume by a palace

A Jacobus Peeters, registered at the Antwerp Guild of Saint Luke as a pupil of the marine painter Peter van de Velde in the guild year 1672–1773, became a master in the Guild as a 'wijnmeester' (i.e. the son of a master) in the guild year 1680-1681. Another Jacobus Peeters, registered as a pupil in the Antwerp Guild in the guild year 1675–76, was admitted as a 'wijnmeester' in the guild year 1688-1689. It is not clear with which of these two masters can be identified with Jacob Balthasar Peeters. On 28 May 1683, his mother and the marine and landscape painter Hendrik van Minderhout entered into a one-year contract pursuant to which van Minderhout was to teach Jacob, who was 22 years old at the time, to draw and paint. The contract further stipulated that "He will learn for a year, in the summer from 7am to 6pm, in the winter from 8am until the fall of darkness. He will paint landscapes and staffage. Outside of his working hours he is allowed to draw, sketch and paint after the works of his master, also on Sundays and holidays, for his own profit. The cost is 100 guilder, a possible second term costs 15 Flemish pounds.

Elected in 1695 to serve as dean of the Guild, he preferred to pay the fixed contribution of 360 guilders to be exempted from this charge. He may possibly be identified with the Jacobus Peeters constschilder (painter) who makes together with his wife Barbara Christina Witten a will on 7 June 1699, while living on Kipdorp near the St. James Church. This couple had between 1699 en 1713 10 children who were all baptized in the St. James' Church, Antwerp. Only three were still alive at the time of death of their parents. Their son Henricus Josephus became an Augustine monk in Antwerp. On 1 March 1727, Peeters and his wife purchased the Sint-Cathelijne house in Kipdorp (now known as Sint-Jacobsmarkt) which was adjacent to the cemetery of the St. James Church.

His pupils included Rombaut Bacx (from guild year 1692-93) and Jan-Baptist van Isschot, Jan Carel Vierpeyl and Nicolaas Gillis (from guild year 1697-98). Jan Baptist van der Straeten, a painter known for architectural views of fantastic palaces not unlike those created by Jacob Baltasar Peeters, was registered in the guild year 1685–1686 at the Antwerp Guild of Saint Luke as a pupil of a Peeters, which may have been Jacob Baltasar Peeters. This assumes that Jacob Baltasar Peeters was the Jacob Peeters who registered as a pupil at the Antwerp Guild of Saint Luke in the guild year 1672–1773.

He died in Antwerp where he was buried in the Saint James Church on 17 December 1732. A pair of paintings depicting the interiors of the Jesuit Church in Antwerp and signed and dated 1721 are evidence that the artist was still alive in that year. If he is the Jacobus Peeter who was the widower of Barbara Christina Witten, he made his will as a widower on 20 November 1753, when he must have been already 92 or 93 years of age.

== Work ==
Jacob Balthasar Peeters was a specialist painter of imaginary Renaissance and Baroque palaces and paintings of existing churches. Peeters would populate these imaginary or existing structures and outdoor settings withelegant figures, usually wearing exotic hats and costumes, together with their, often black, pages and dogs running around. About 12 church interiors by him are known, all of a very high standard. In addition, there are about 10 palace scenes and harbor views. Only two paintings are signed 'JACOB BAL PEETERS'. The most common signature is 'JACOB PEETERS.'

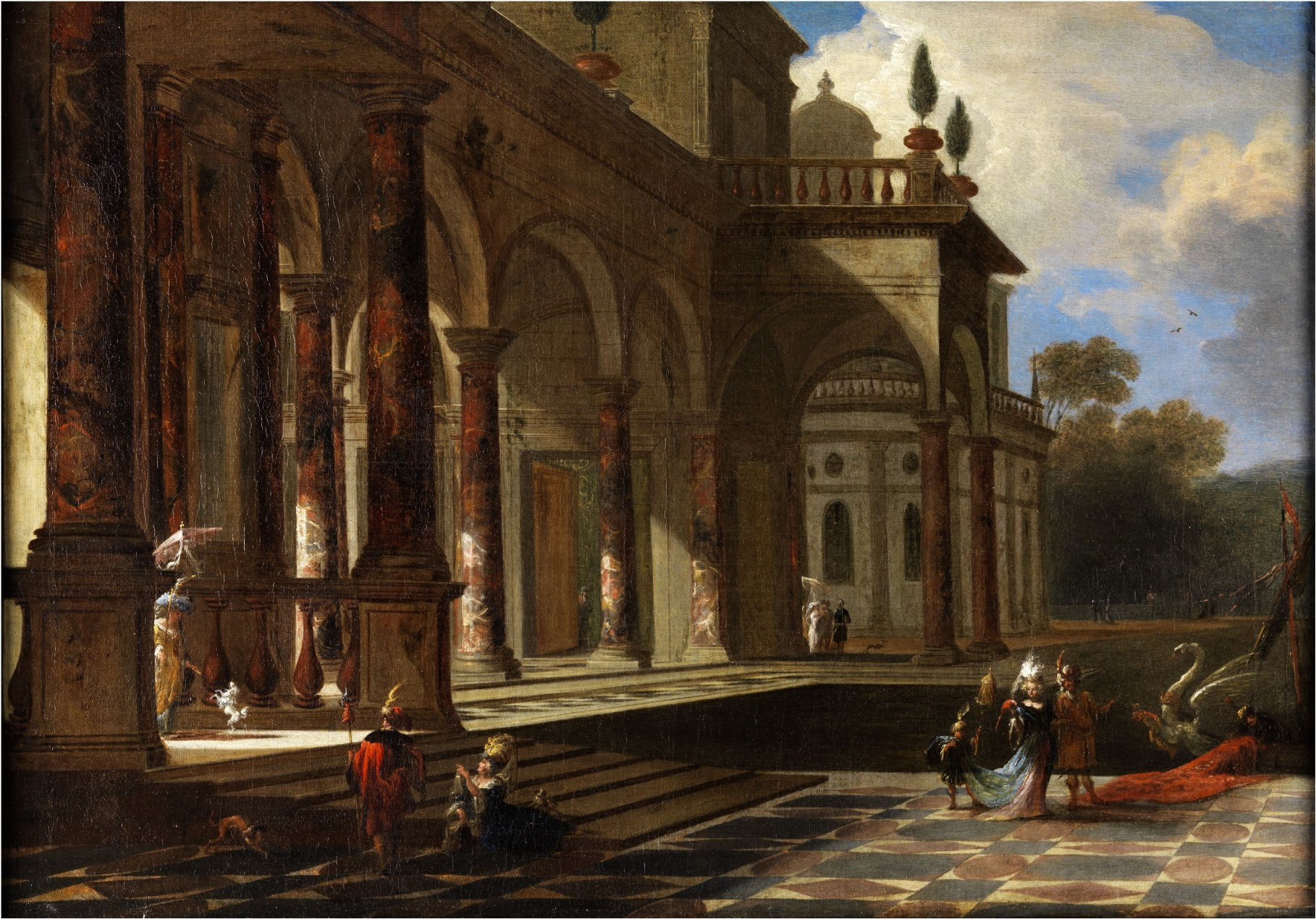
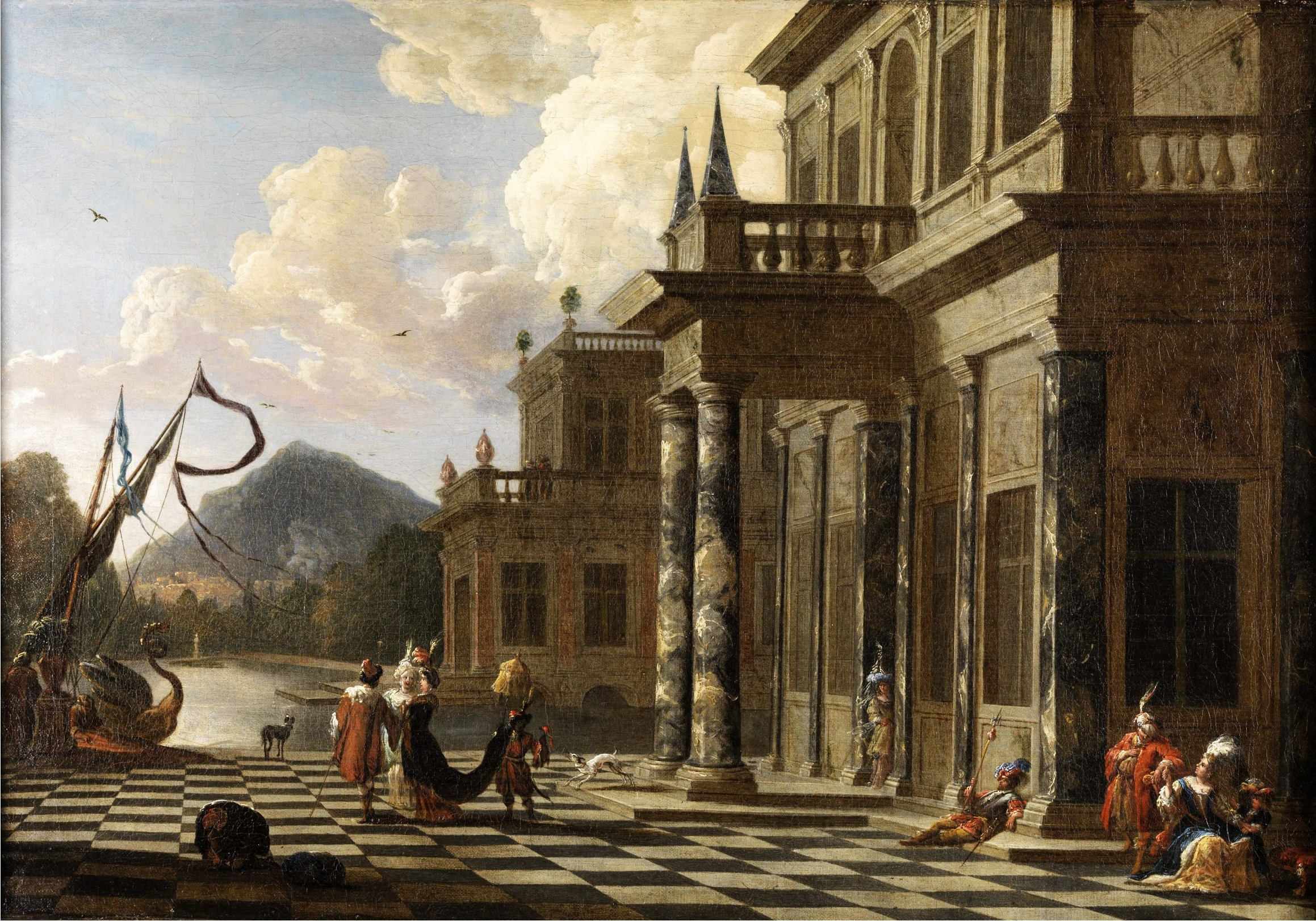
Fantastic courtly architecture with staffage

As was common practice in Antwerp artistic practice of that period, Peeters collaborated with other artists such as the staffage painters Frans Breydel (1679–1750) and Jacob van Hal. A pair of paintings depicting Fantastic courtly architecture with staffage (Hampel Munich auction of 25 September 2014, lot 679) are the product of a collaboration between Peeters and Hendrik van Minderhout. Van Minderhout was a Dutch painter active in Antwerp who often contributed the figures to works by local landscape and perspective painters including Wilhelm Schubert van Ehrenberg. Peeters had also studied with van Minderhout in 1683-1685. The aforementioned pair of pictures, which were made to be hung next to each other, demonstrate the fantastic, almost surreal, aspects of Peeters' imaginary views. One of the canvases provides an idealized view of a palace with round arched loggias supported by columns and the other of a courtly façade with a portico and a balustrade on top. The buildings are placed respectively on the left and right and disappear in the distance with foreshortening at the rear. Each painting continues onto a view of an idealized park landscape with a large pond on which float pleasure ships with swans as figureheads. The backdrop is a blue sky with brightly lit, white-gray clouds. The artist enlivened the scene by having light fall through the loggia arches, which contrasts with the architectural façade, which is in the shade. Groups of figures in the foreground include ladies and gentlemen who are as fanciful as the architecture. The figures are shown in theatrical, stage-like postures, some engaged in conversation. The ladies have towering hairdos and the gentlemen wear turbans or feathered helmets. A black servant carries the train of one of the ladies' dresses. A guard holding a lance is reclining against the façade of one of the palaces. Some dogs are running among these figures.

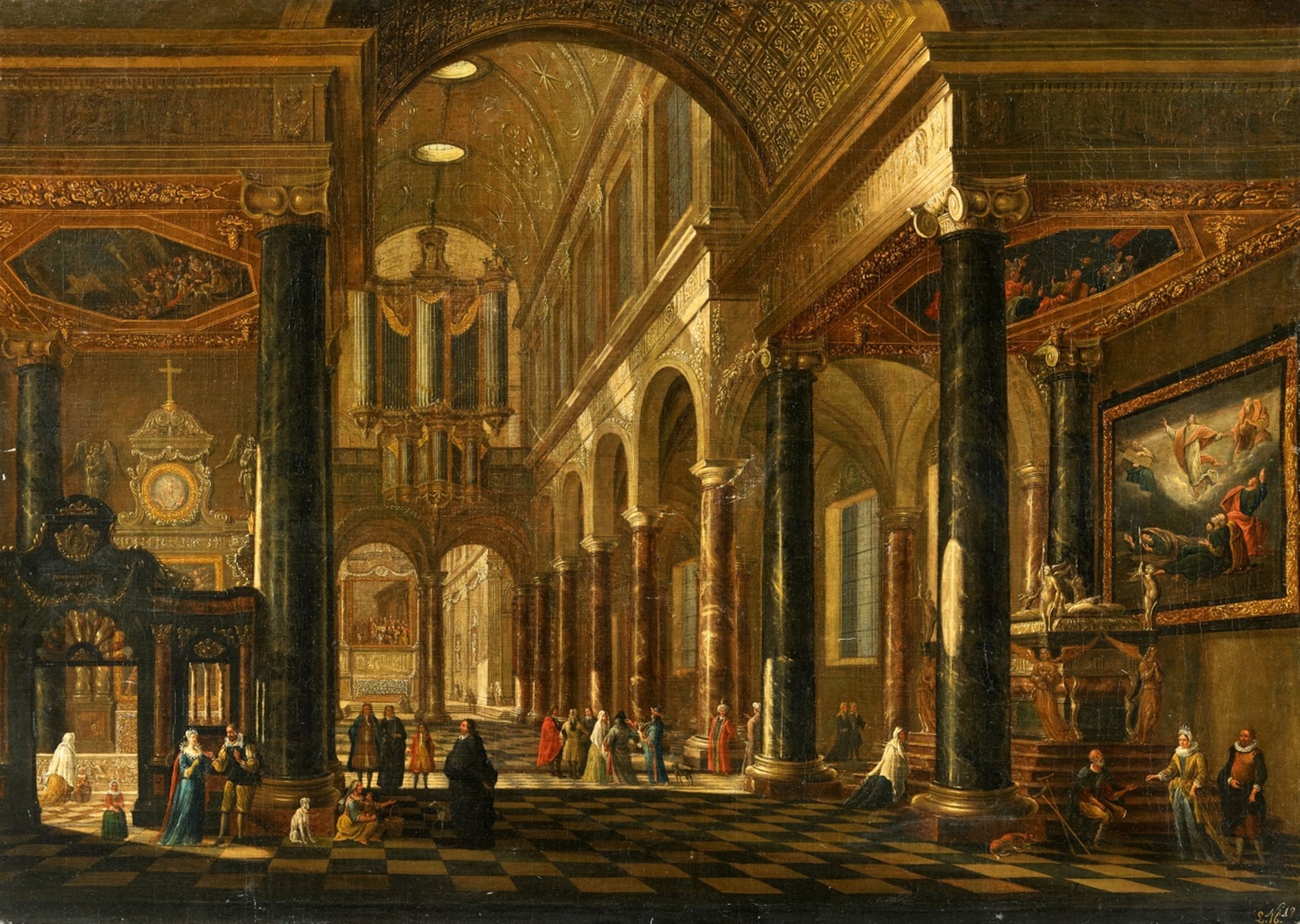
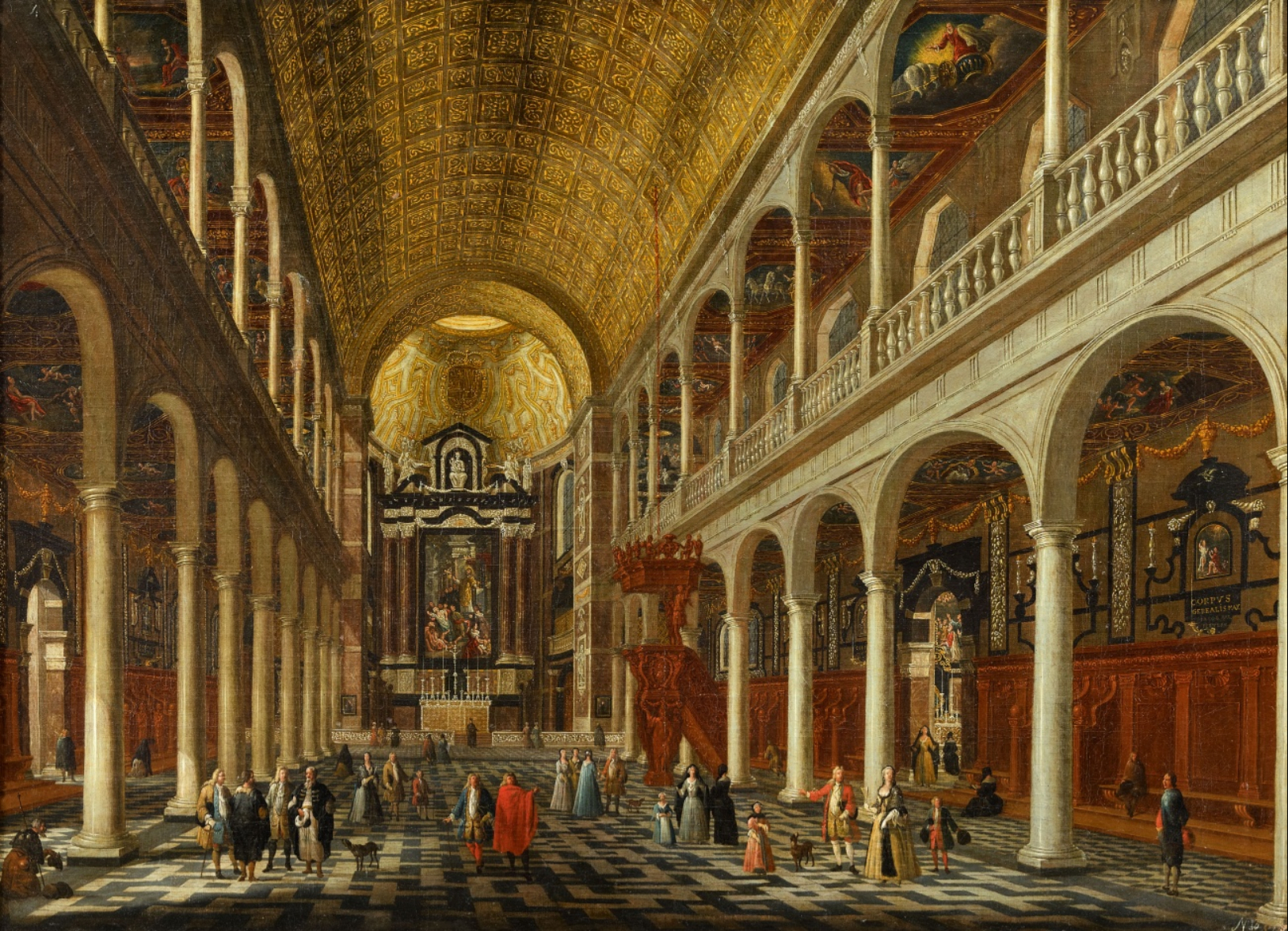
Interior of the Jesuit Church in Antwerp

Jacob Balthasar Peeters painted a number of church interiors including of the Jesuit churches of Bruges and Antwerp. This theme was popular in the Low Countries throughout the 17th century. Antwerp artists preferred depicting interiors of high baroque interiors while Dutch artists concentrated on the barren interiors of Protestant churches despoiled of their decorations. In comparison to the earlier church interiors of Flemish and Dutch masters, Peeters' church interiors reflect 18th century artistic preferences through the addition of elegant figures and their attention to detail. One pair of works in the Statens Museum for Kunst in Copenhagen dated 1714 depicts the interior of the Jesuit St. Charles Borromeo Church in Antwerp. A pair of views of the same church were recently on the art market (Lempertz Cologne auction of 19 November 2016). The works created in 1721 show the church in the state before part of its decoration was destroyed by fire on 18 July 1718. In the fire, the interior of the church, including ceiling murals painted by Peter Paul Rubens, was destroyed. Peeters was able to include the lost decorations in these two compositions by using his own compositions which predated the fire such as the works now in the Statens Museum for Kunst. He also relied on the paintings of the interior of the church made by the painter Anton Gunther Gheringh.

Peeters' work shows a strong similarity with other Flemish architecture painters of his time such as Jacobus Ferdinandus Saey and Peeters' own pupil Jan Baptist van der Straeten. The similarities are such that the works of these artists can often not be easily distinguished from each other. A painting depicting the Courtyard of Rubens' House in Antwerp (Buckinghamshire County Museum, Aylesbury) was possibly painted by Jacob Balthasar Peeters or Anton Gunther Gheringh, another architectural painter active in Antwerp.
