= Jan Baptist van der Straeten =

Flemish painter

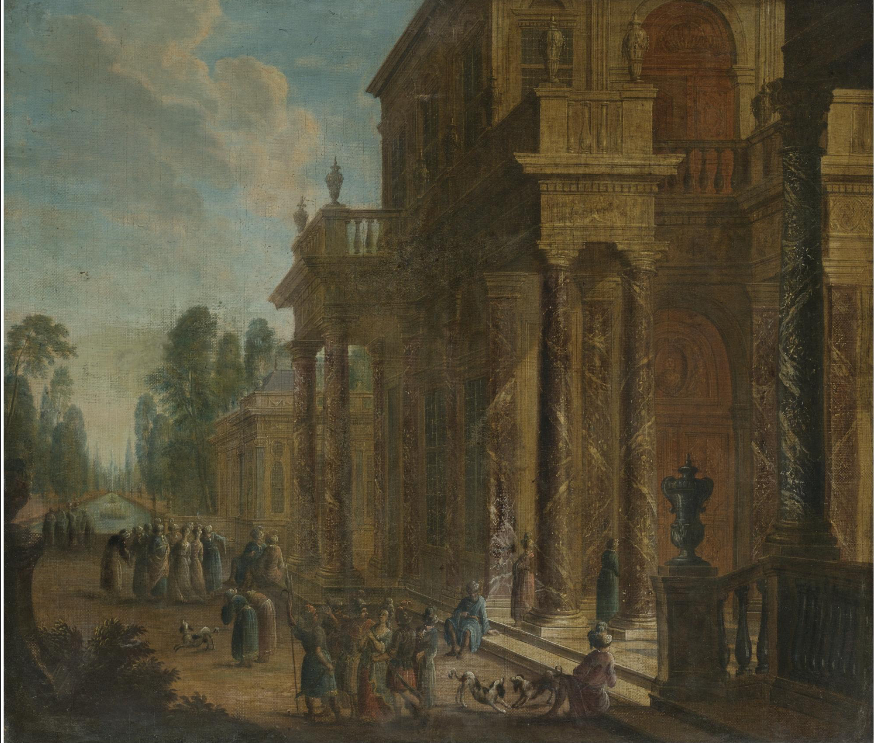
Capriccio of a palace exterior with figures conversing in the foreground

Jan Baptist van der Straeten (c. 1671 – between 1731 and 1741) was a Flemish painter who specialized in architectural paintings depicting gallant companies amidst imaginary Renaissance and Baroque palaces and buildings.

== Life ==
Very few details about the life of Jan Baptist van der Straeten are known. It is known that the artist was active in Antwerp from about 1685 to 1731. In 1685–86, he became an apprentice of the architecture and perspective painter Jacob Balthasar Peeters and was registered as such in the records of the Antwerp Guild of Saint Luke.

Not much of his career is known. His last known dated work is dated to 1731 (Auctioned by Sotheby's on 12 February 2008, London, lot 124). The date and place of his death are not known.

== Work ==
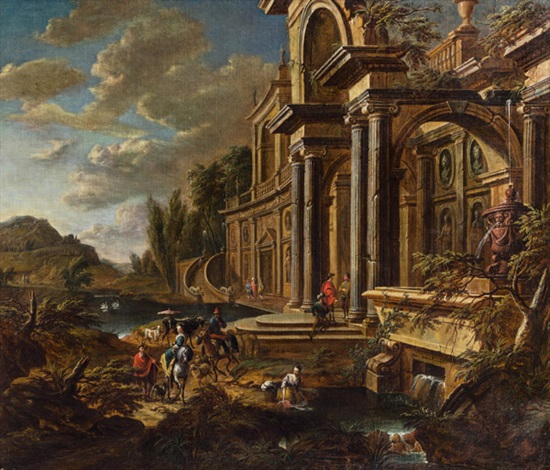
Renaissance palace near a river with many figures

Jan Baptist van der Straeten was a specialist architectural painter who created scenes with imaginary buildings and staffage referred to as capriccios. His architectural fantasies depict opulent palaces amidst terraces, gardens and fountains with a typical Baroque love of exaggeration. The figural groups of elegant figures populating the scenes were painted usually by the Antwerp artist Balthasar van den Bossche.

Van der Straeten favoured a brown palette over bright colours thus giving atmospheric coherence to his compositions. The Flemish architectural painters of his time such as Wilhelm Schubert van Ehrenberg, Jacobus Ferdinandus Saey and Jacob Balthasar Peeters had been influenced by Italian painters, in particular of Viviano Codazzi, who was a well-known capriccio painter
