= St. Charles Borromeo Church, Antwerp =

Church in Antwerp, Belgium

St Charles Borromeo church
- Church of St Charles Borromeo
- Sint-Carolus Borromeuskerk
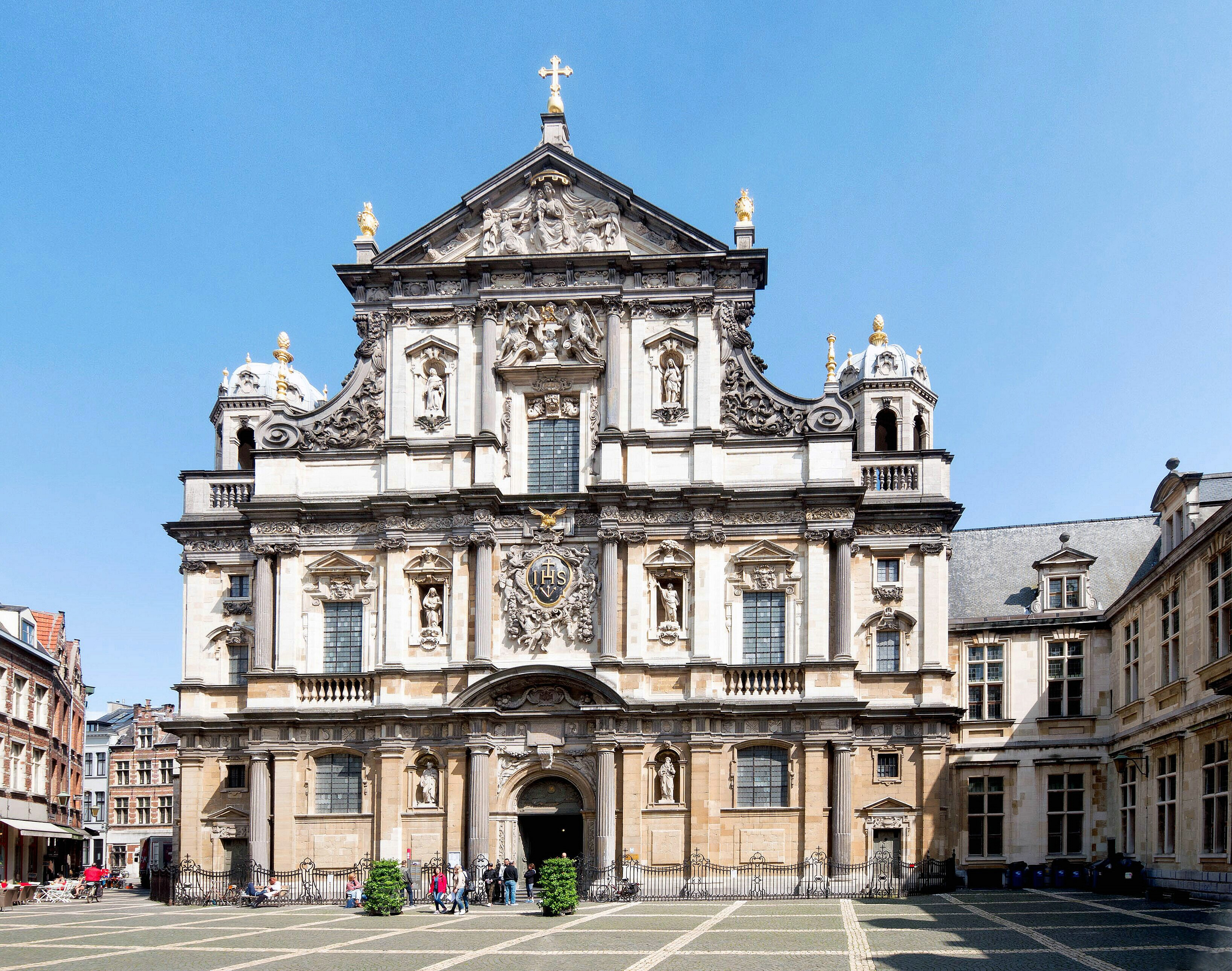
- The Baroque façade on the Hendrik Conscienceplein
- St Charles Borromeo church
- 51°13′15.8″N 4°24′16.1″E
- Location: Antwerp
- Country: Belgium
- Denomination: Catholic
- Website: top.carolusborromeus.com

History
- Former name: St Ignatius Loyola
- Status: parish church (since 1803)
- Founder: Jacobus Tirinus
- Dedication: St Charles Borromeo
- Dedicated: 1779 (rededication)
- Consecrated: 1625

Architecture
- Functional status: Active
- Heritage designation: protected monument (built heritage)
- Designated: 1939
- Architect(s): Pieter Huyssens, François d'Aguilon
- Style: Baroque
- Years built: 1615-1621
- Completed: 1626
- Closed: 1773

Administration
- Province: Mechelen-Brussels
- Diocese: Antwerp

Clergy
- Priest: Hendrik Hoet

St. Charles Borromeo Church (Dutch: Sint-Carolus Borromeuskerk) is a Roman Catholic church in central Antwerp, Belgium, located on the Hendrik Conscienceplein. It was built in 1615–1621 as the Jesuit church of Antwerp, which was closed in 1773. It was rededicated in 1779 to Saint Charles Borromeo. The church was formerly known for 39 ceiling pieces by Peter Paul Rubens that were lost in a fire when lightning struck the church on 18 July 1718.

== History ==
The church was inspired by the Church of the Gesu, the mother church of the Society of Jesus, a Roman Catholic religious order also known as the Jesuits. The church was built next to the Huis van Aecken, bought from the heirs of Erasmus II Schetz. It was the first church in the world to be dedicated to the Jesuit founder, Ignatius Loyola.

In 1617–18, Peter Paul Rubens painted two altarpieces. He was also commissioned to paint the ceiling pieces, for which he made the designs while the execution was done mostly by pupils, including Anthony van Dyck. A contract was drawn up in 1620 by Jacobus Tirinus and the paintings were delivered a year later in time for the consecration. Rubens received 7,000 guilders for his works in the church, and though the lavish decorations including sculptures and other artwork were well received, Tirinus was dismissed in 1625 for going beyond his budget.

In 1718, the vault of the nave, including Rubens' ceiling paintings, was destroyed by fire. Jan Pieter van Baurscheidt the Elder restored the damaged parts according to the original plan, but replaced the original coffers with wide transverse arches. In 1773, the Society of Jesus was suppressed and the building was confiscated. It reopened in 1779, renamed St. Charles Borromeo Church, after Charles Borromeo.

Since 1803, St. Charles Borromeo Church has been in use as a parish church. During the Dutch rule preceding Belgium's independence in 1830, the Baroque interior was sobered to make it a Protestant church.

A restoration campaign in the 1980s brought back the churche's Baroque splendor. Besides works by Rubens, the interior displays paintings by Gerard Seghers, Daniel Seghers, and Cornelis Schut.

On 30 August 2009, a fire broke out again, but none of the important artworks were damaged.

== Gallery ==
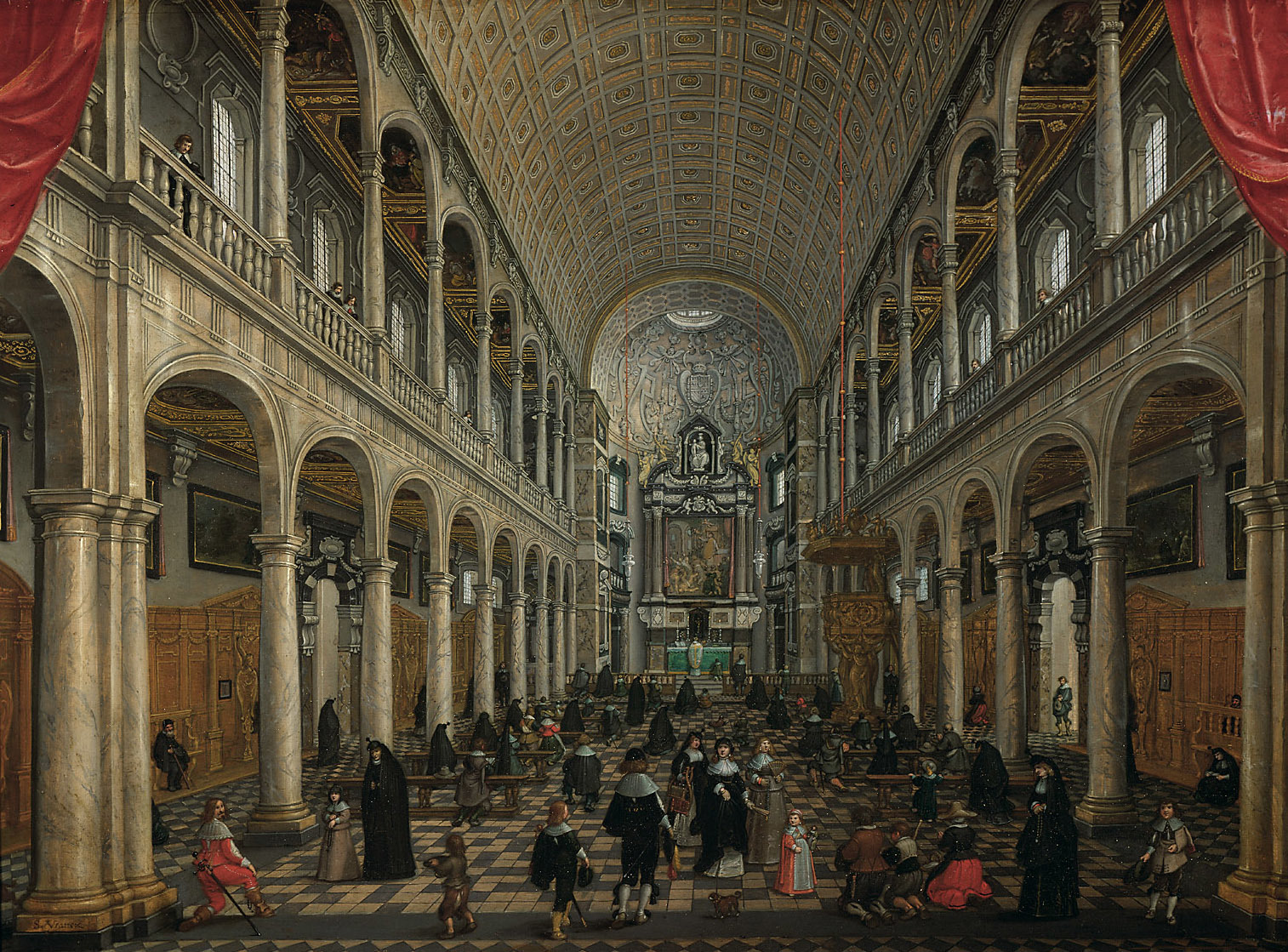
Painting of the interior by Sebastiaen Vrancx, c. 1630

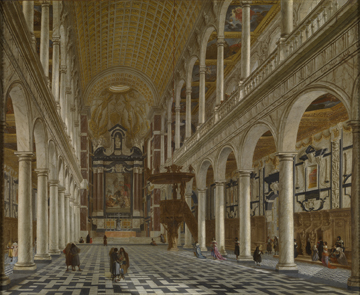
Painting of the interior by Hieronymus Janssens and Wilhelm Schubert van Ehrenberg, c. 1660

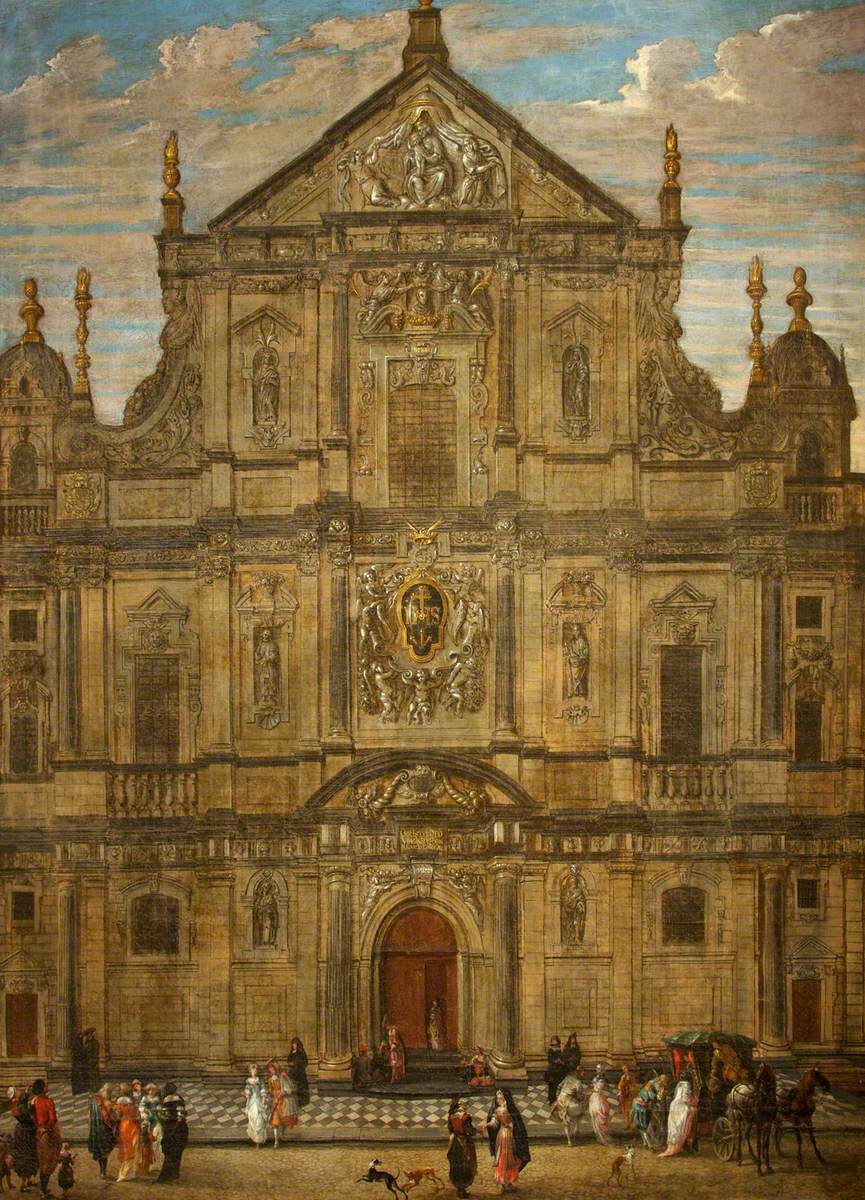
Painting of the façade by Anton Gunther Ghering, c. 1665

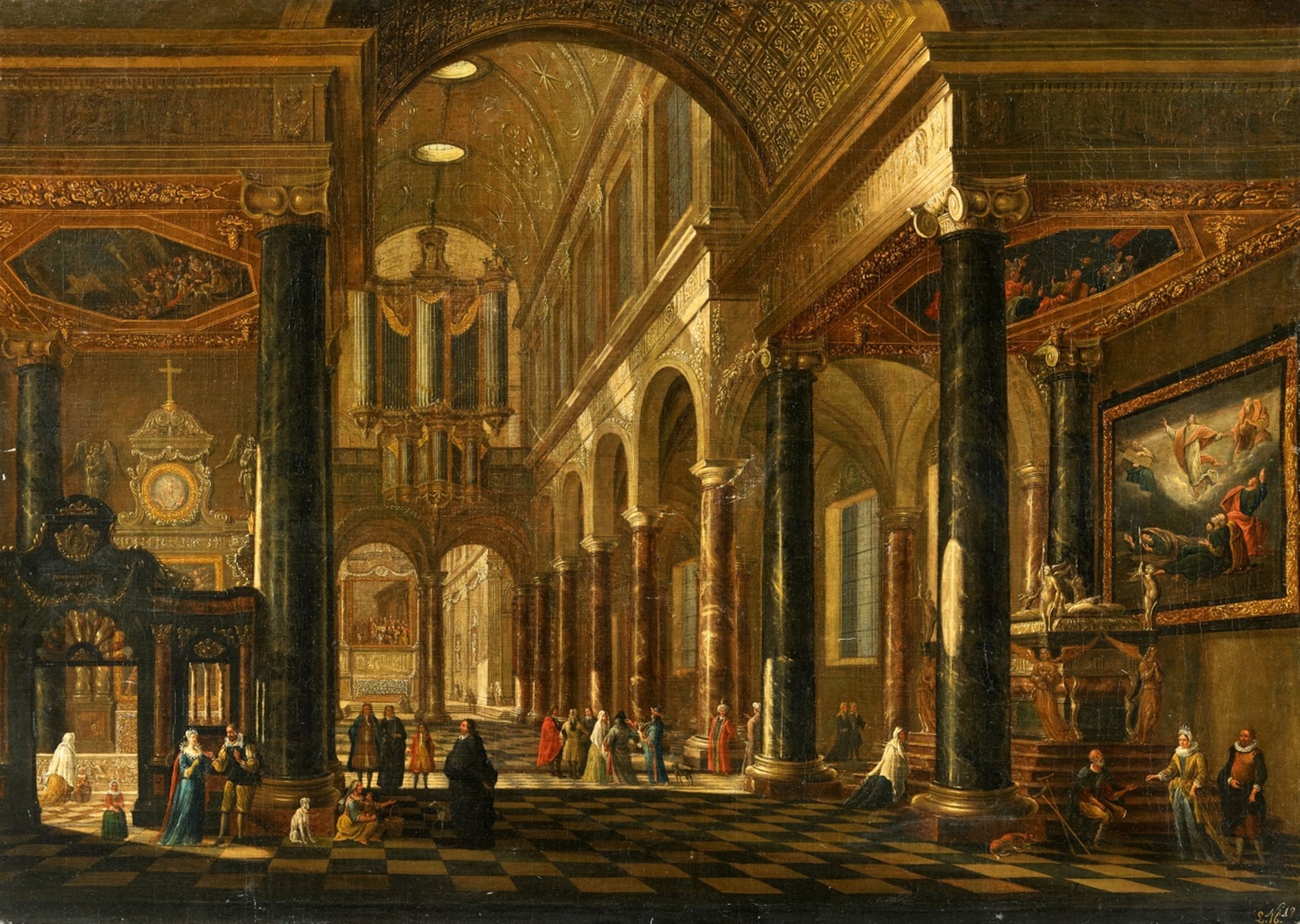
Interior of the church showing the state before the fire by Jacob Balthasar Peeters, 1721

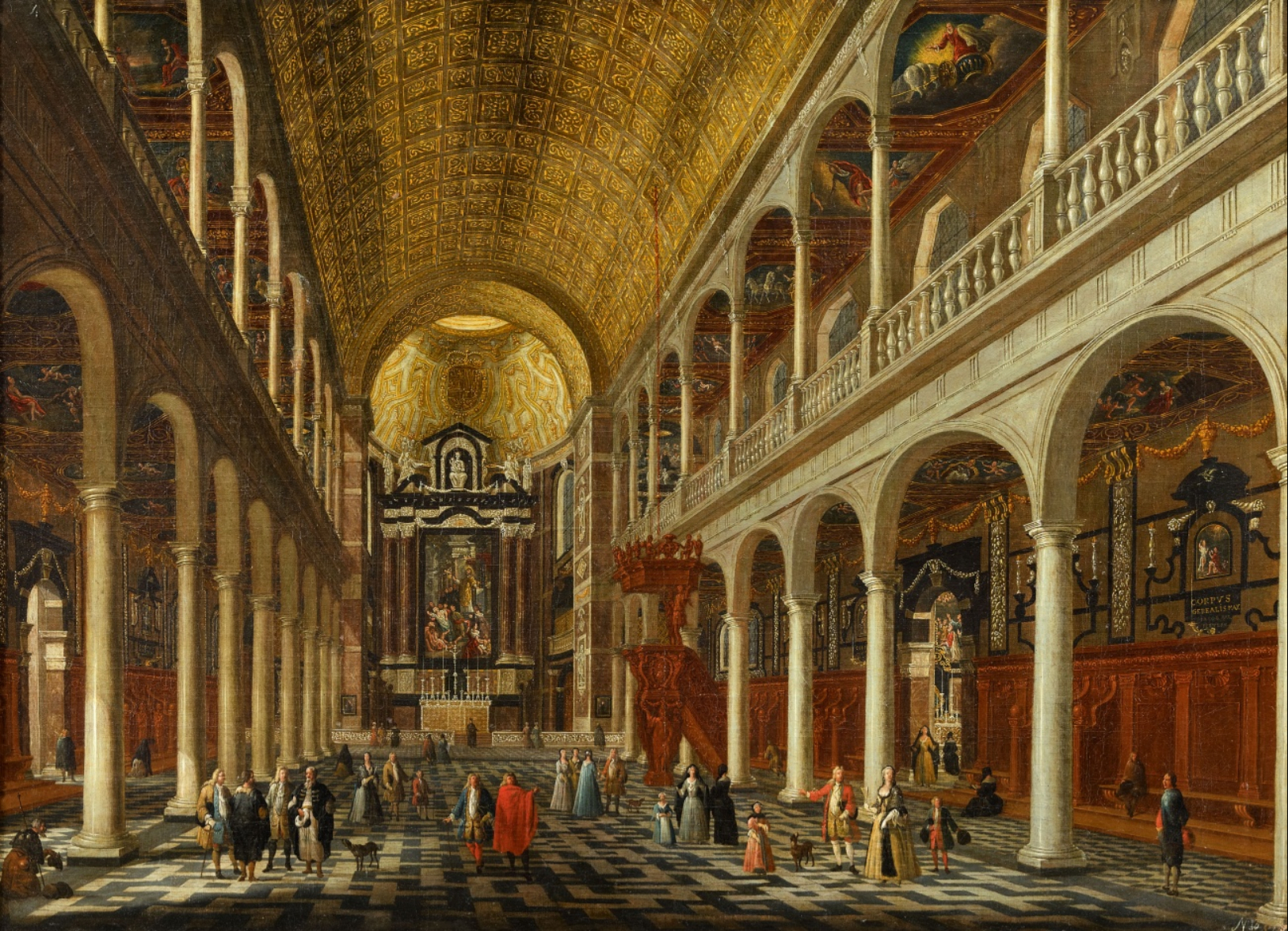
Interior of the church showing the state before the fire by Jacob Balthasar Peeters, 1721

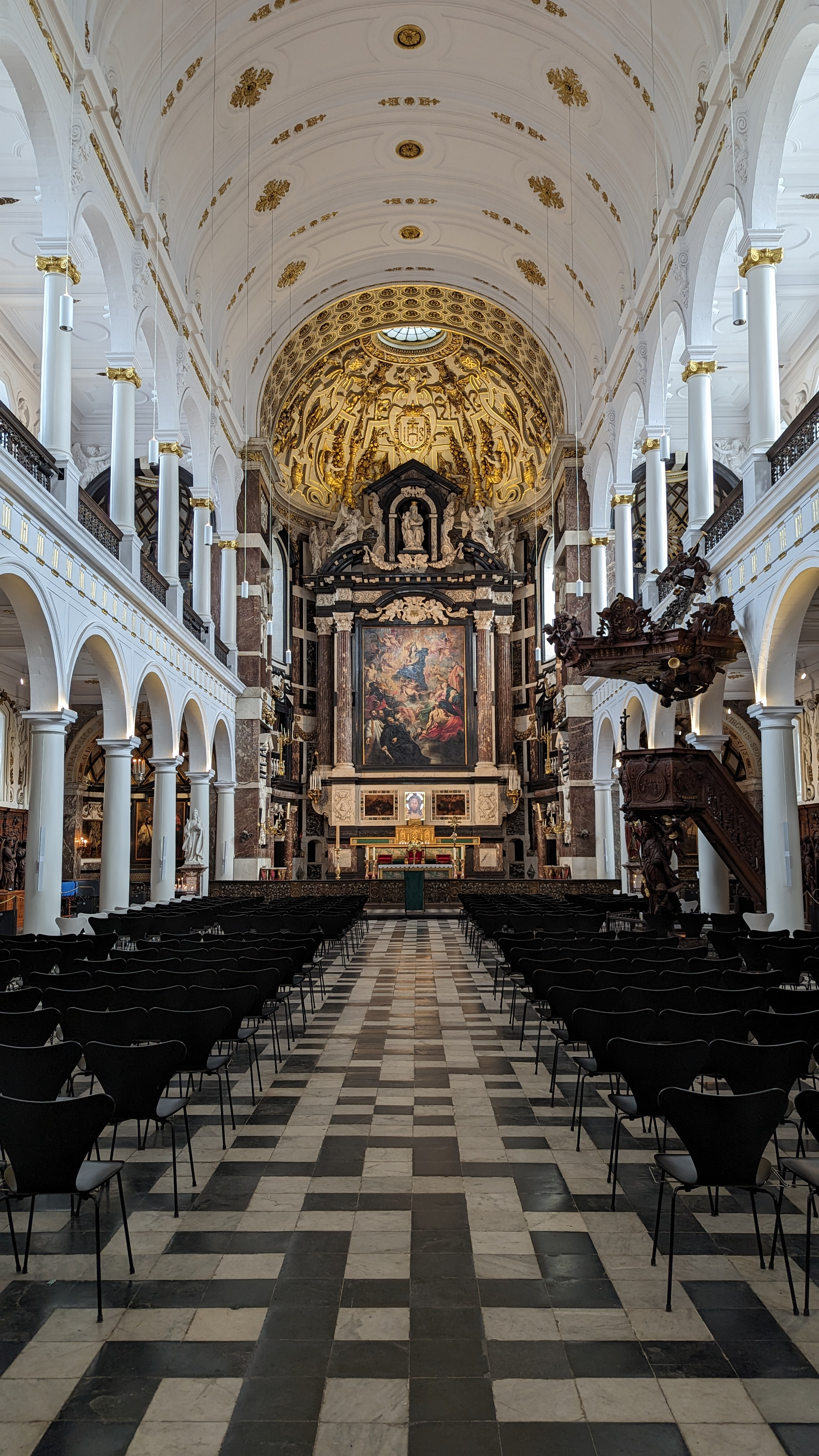
Church interior as it appeared in 2023

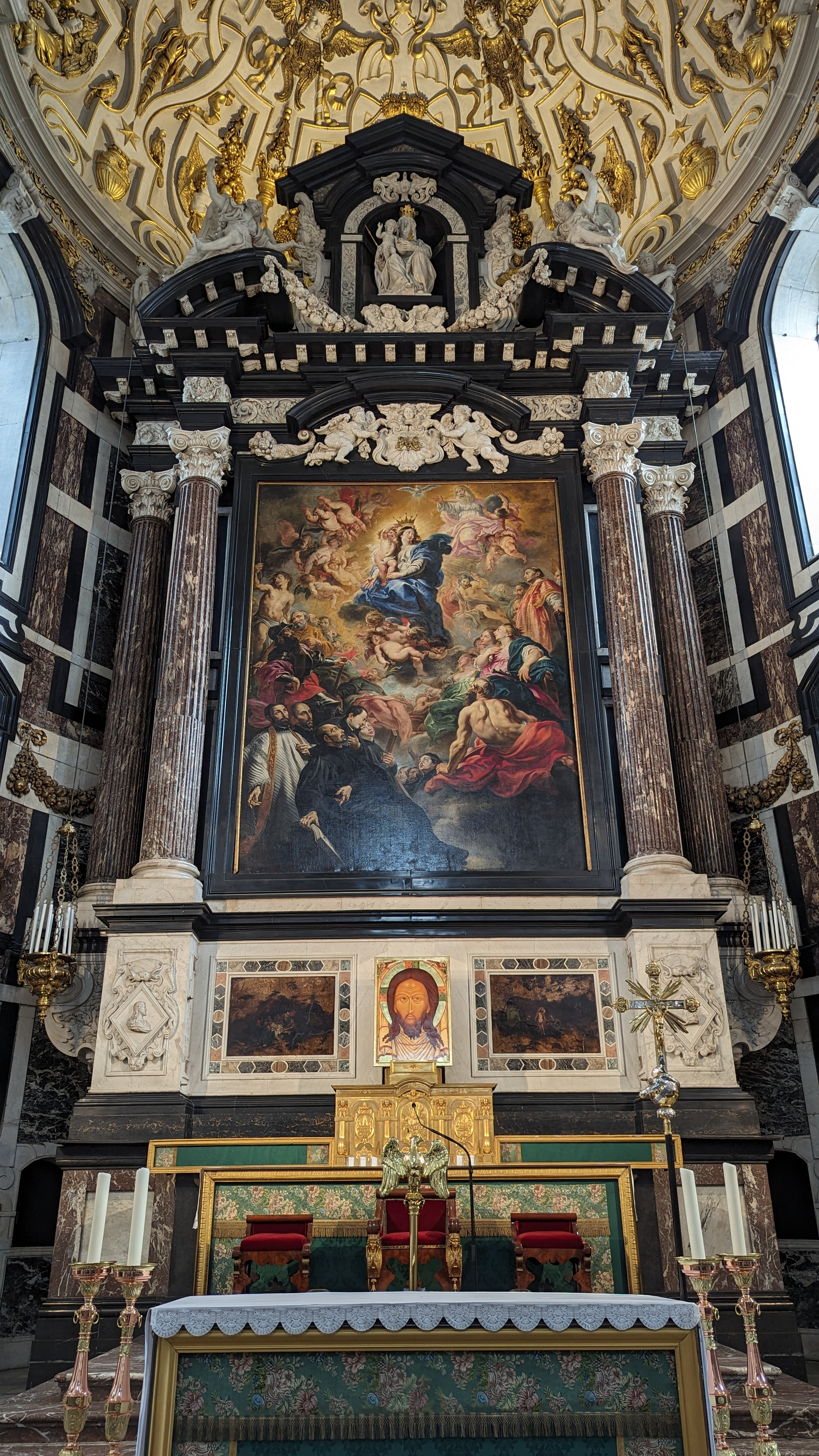
Church altar, including altarpiece by Rubens

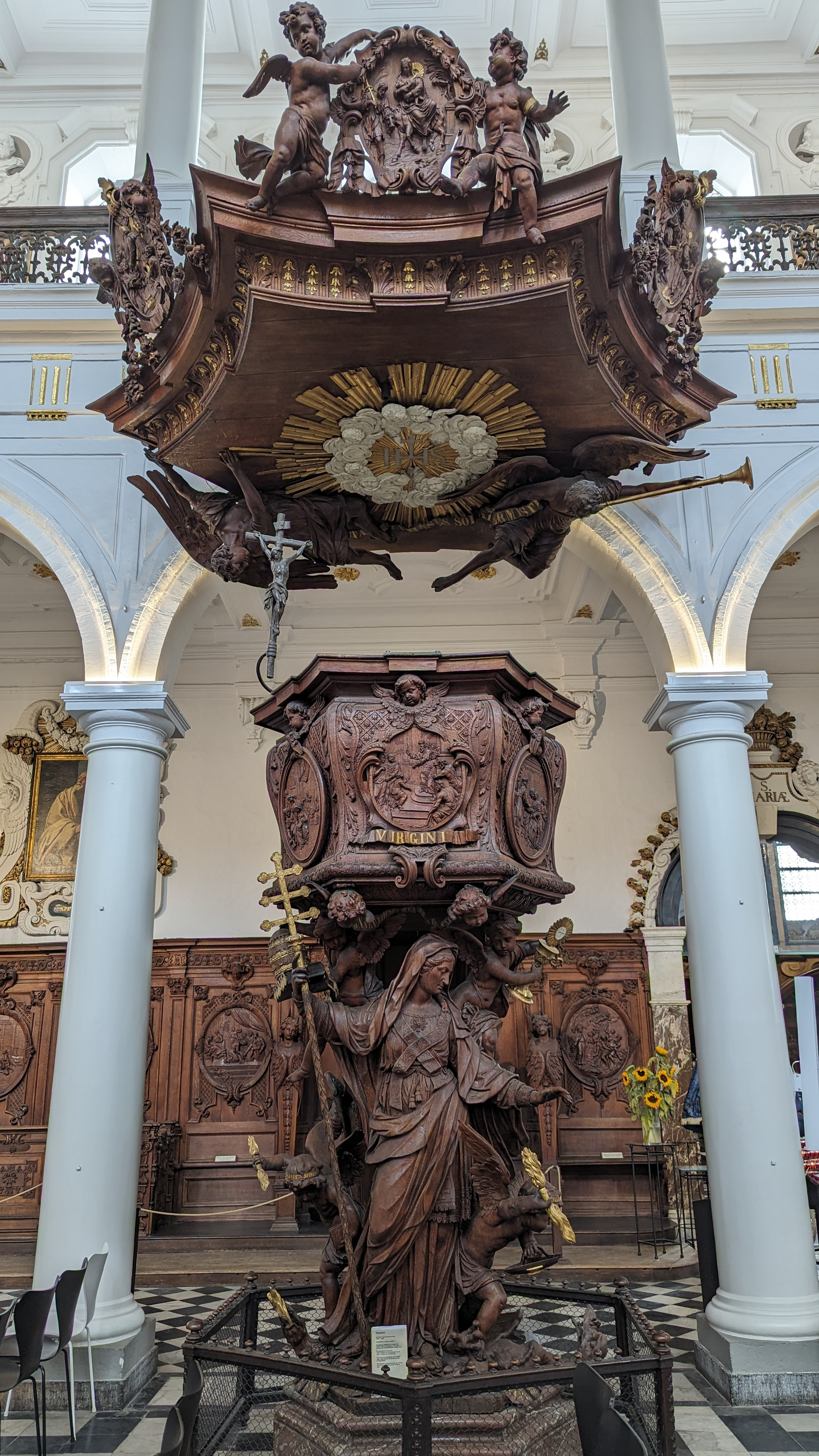
The church's pulpit, carved by Jan Pieter Van Baurscheit the Elder after the 1718 fire

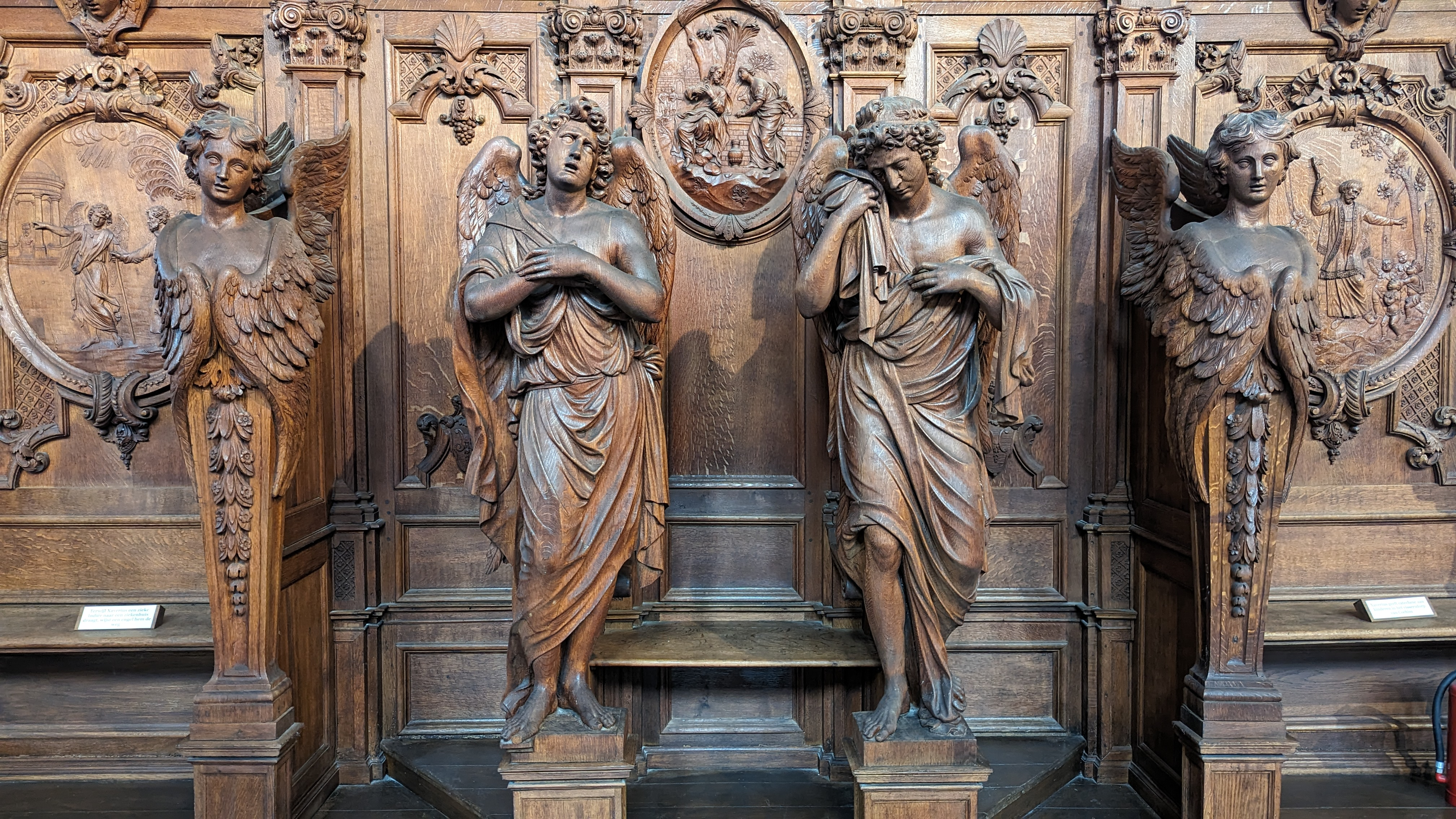
Wooden carvings of four angels on the left side of the main hall

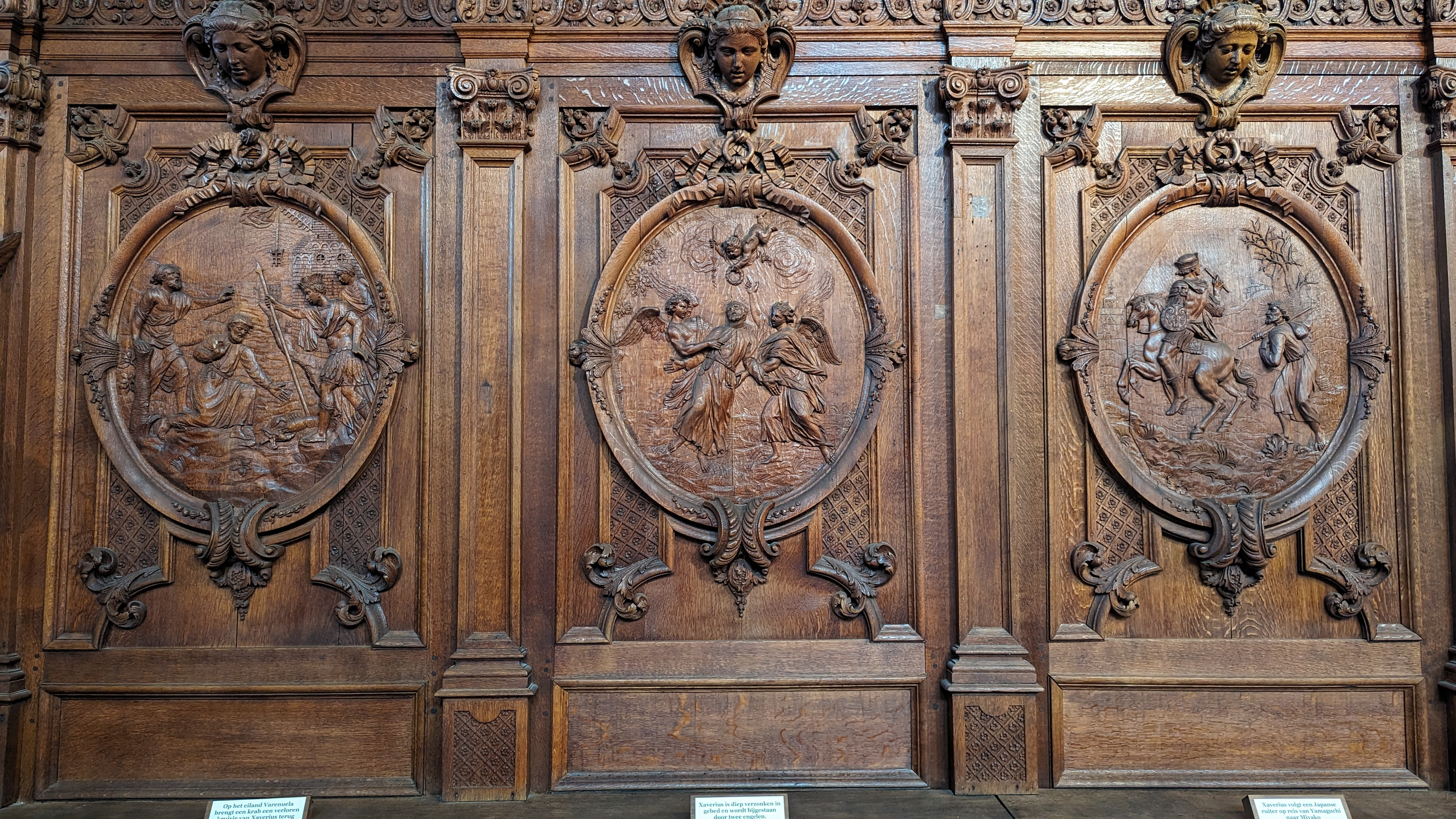
Scenes from the life of St. Francis Xavier

== See also ==
- List of Jesuit sites
- List of Catholic churches in Belgium
