= The Elevation of the Cross (Rubens) =

Triptych by Peter Paul Rubens

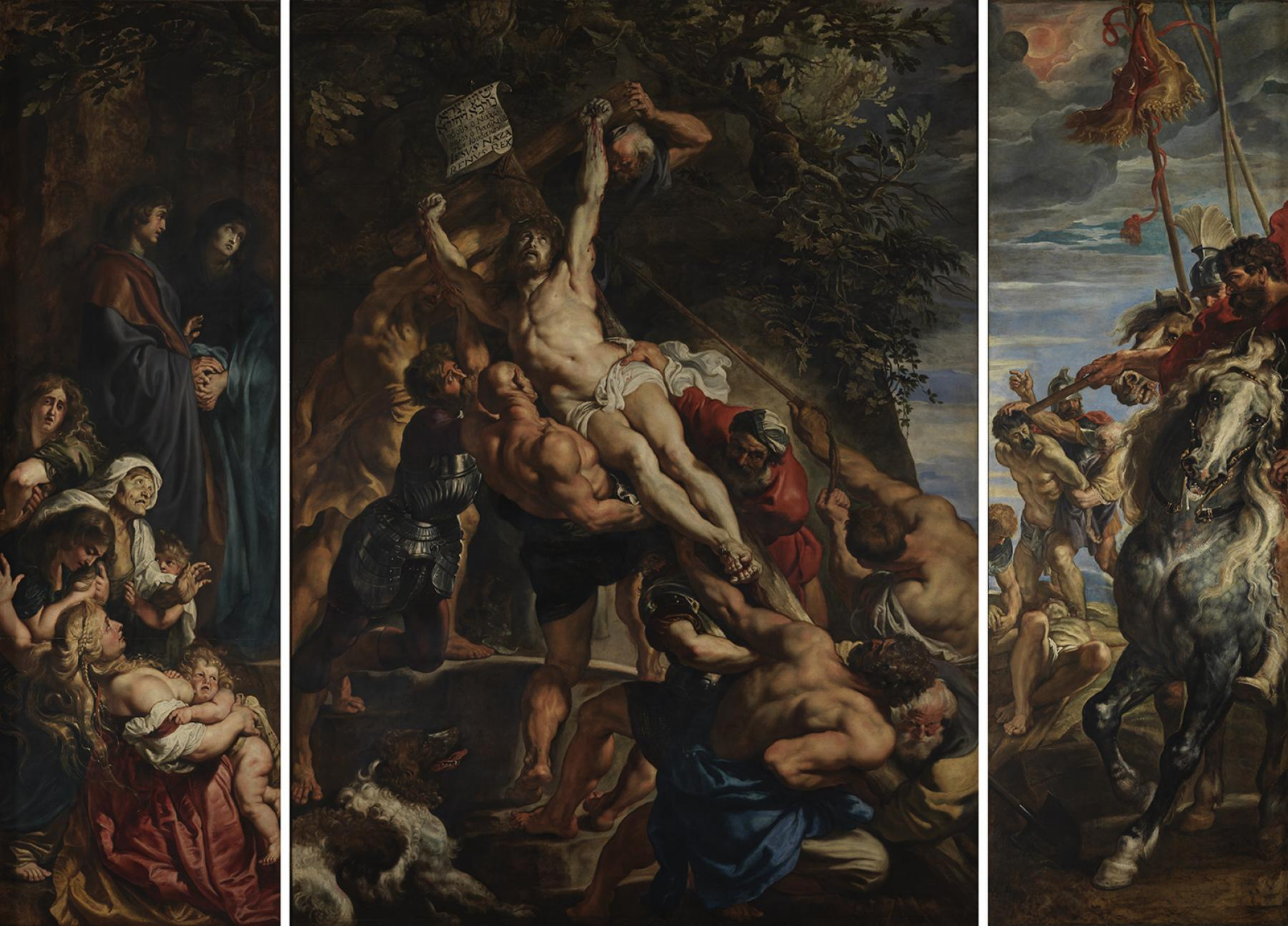
- Artist: Peter Paul Rubens
- Year: 1610–11
- Medium: Oil on wood
- Dimensions: 462 cm × 341 cm (182 in × 134 in)
- Location: Cathedral of Our Lady, Antwerp

The Elevation of the Cross or The Raising of the Cross is the title of a large triptych painted in oil on panel by the Flemish artist Peter Paul Rubens in Antwerp in the years 1610 and 1611. It hangs in the Cathedral of Our Lady in Antwerp. The work is a winged altarpiece, with hinged wings that can be folded over the central panel, allowing an 'open view' and a 'closed view'. The three panels on the obverse side depict in a creative way episodes from the Passion of Jesus at the moment of the raising of the Cross on which Jesus is nailed.

Rubens painted the triptych for the high altar of the St. Walburga Church in Antwerp. It was his first important religious commission after his return to Antwerp in late 1608 from a long stay in Italy. The triptych introduced large-scale Baroque painting in Flemish art and established Rubens's reputation as a leading painter in Flanders.

== Visual analysis ==
The obverse side of the triptych depicts scenes from the stories on the crucifixion of Jesus. The principal scene is depicted on the central panel and shows a group of 9 men comprising Roman soldiers, an old man wearing a turban and muscular half-naked men straining with bulging muscles to haul, lift and push up the cross on which Jesus is already nailed. One of the men is a knight in a cuirass who may be a self-portrait of Rubens. Elements of the central story overflow from the middle panel onto the wings on both sides.

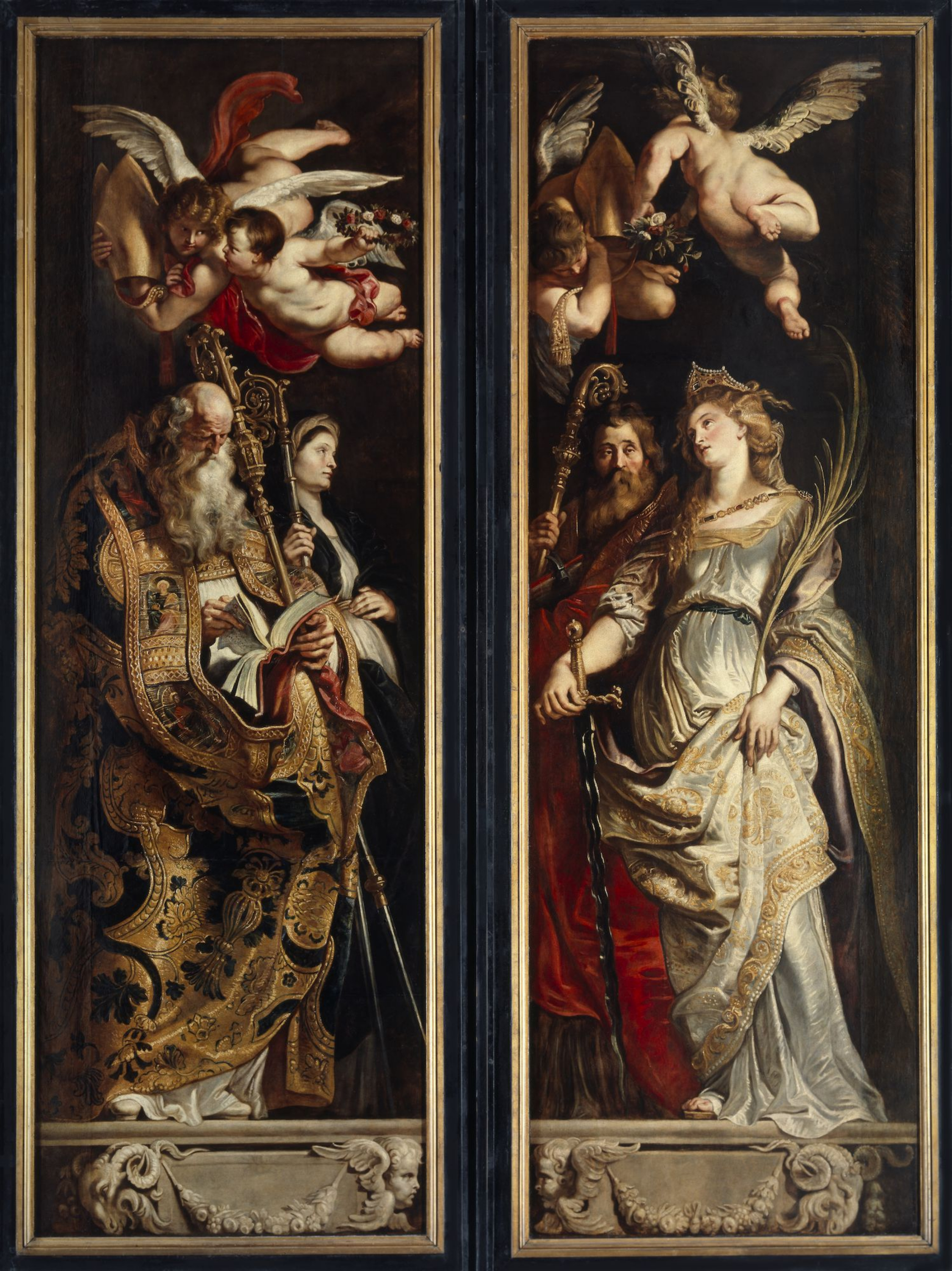
Closed view showing Saints Amand and Walburga (left) and Saints Eligius and Catherine of Alexandria (right)

That such a large number of very muscled men struggle to lift up the cross visualizes the immense weight of the crucified Jesus who in Catholic tradition is believed to carry all the sins of the world. Jesus's suffering is shown in his strained and tense body, hands clenched tight around the nails in his hands. Jesus's body is a picture of classical nobility: with arms raised and gaze turned upward, Rubens emphasizes Jesus's willing sacrifice over the horrors of his crucifixion. Jesus has an expression of melancholy and silent pleading and with his raised arms he seems to invoke the succour of God, while his face shows acceptance of his inevitable destiny. Jesus is looking up and his mouth is half-open as if he is talking to God and pronouncing one of the sayings of Jesus on the cross that are noted in the various Gospels. An agitated dog is panting in the left-hand corner.

The left wing shows a number of witnesses to the crucifixion. At the top stand John the Apostle and Jesus's mother Mary who observe the events with sorrow but without emotional outburst, as they are aware of the deeper meaning of the crucifixion. St. John tries to calm Mary by caressing her hands. At the bottom is a group comprising a child, one old woman and three young women, of whom one is nursing a baby. The women show an extreme emotional reaction to the dramatic events which they are witnessing. The women seem to embody figure by figure the stages of horror and dismay.

The right wing shows the two men (bandits or thieves according to tradition) who were executed alongside Jesus according to the Gospels. One is supine as he is being attached to his cross while the other with tied hands is aggressively pushed forward by two men. On the foreground on the right are two Roman officers on horseback one of which is issuing orders with a baton held in his right hand.

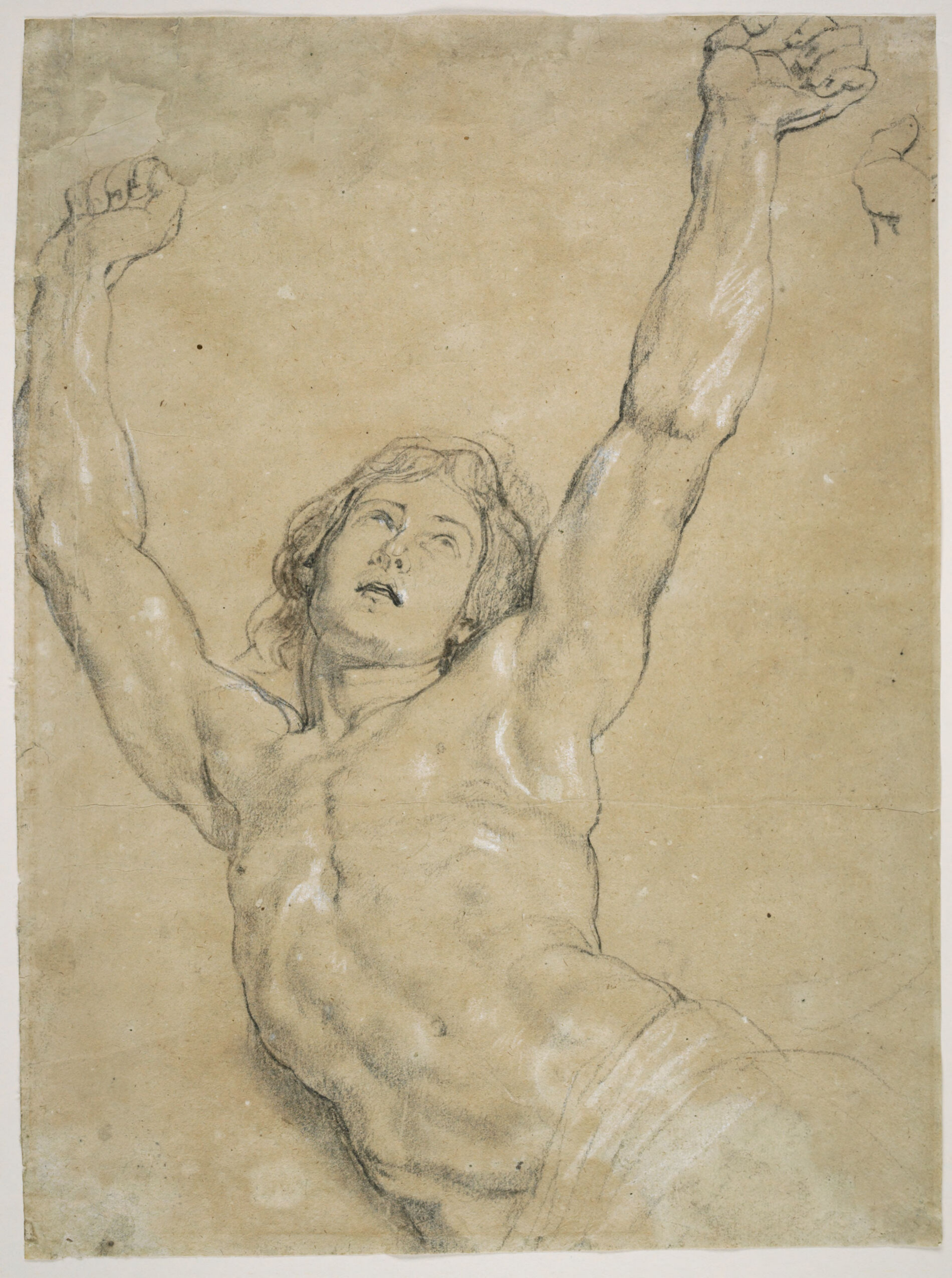
Study for the figure of Jesus

The scenes in the three panels are tied to each other harmoniously through the landscape and sky. The background of the left and central panels is formed by a continuous rocky outcropping with vines and oak trees. St. John and Mary on the left panel are standing on the same rock level as the executioners just to their left on the central panel. The central and right panels share the same darkening sky, which announces the impending eclipse of the sun as recounted in the Gospel of Matthew (27:45). The setting is dark and restless as the group of spectators, soldiers, horses, and the strained bodies of the executioners surround Jesus on the Cross.

The reverse side of the wings depicts four saints that were the patron saints of the church and were particularly venerated in Flanders at the time of Rubens. On the far left stands Saint Amand clothed impressively in bishop's robes, with St. Walburga next to him. On the right outer wing Saint Catherine of Alexandria and Saint Eligius are depicted. On the socles, garlands of fruit announce the fruits that believers will gain from Jesus's martyrdom. Rubens made oil sketches in grisaille of the shutters, which are in the Dulwich Picture Gallery collection.

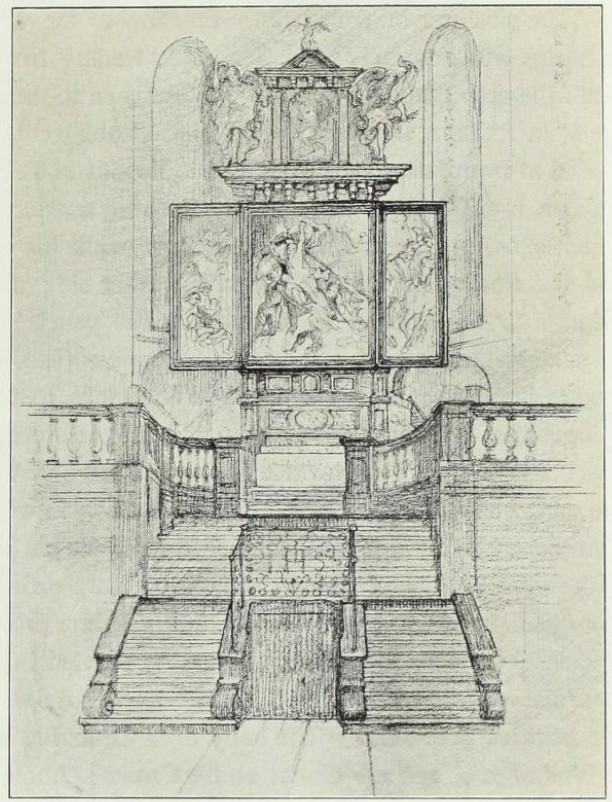
High Altar of the St. Walburga Church showing the Raising of the Cross in its original setting (drawn by Piet Verhaert after an old painting)

The Antwerp triptych was placed above the high altar that could be reached by a set of stairs, making it visible from a great distance in the large Gothic St. Walburga Church. This height was unusual for an altarpiece indicating its important presence in the church. The triptych was surrounded on all sides by images of God, Jesus and angels. Under the triptych were originally three predellas showing the body of St Catherine borne away by angels, the miracle of St Walburga and Jesus on the Cross. At the top of the structure was a gilded wooden pelican. It was a common symbolic representation of Jesus, which was derived from the ancient legend of a pelican which hacked its brood to death in a rage and later brought them back to life with its own blood. Through the overall arrangement Rubens was able to unite the upper and middle zones of the altar. The fluttering movements of the angels above would have created the sense that the action extended beyond the confines of the actual picture structure. A such, the work can be considered the first display of a fully Baroque interpretation of space in a northern European altarpiece.

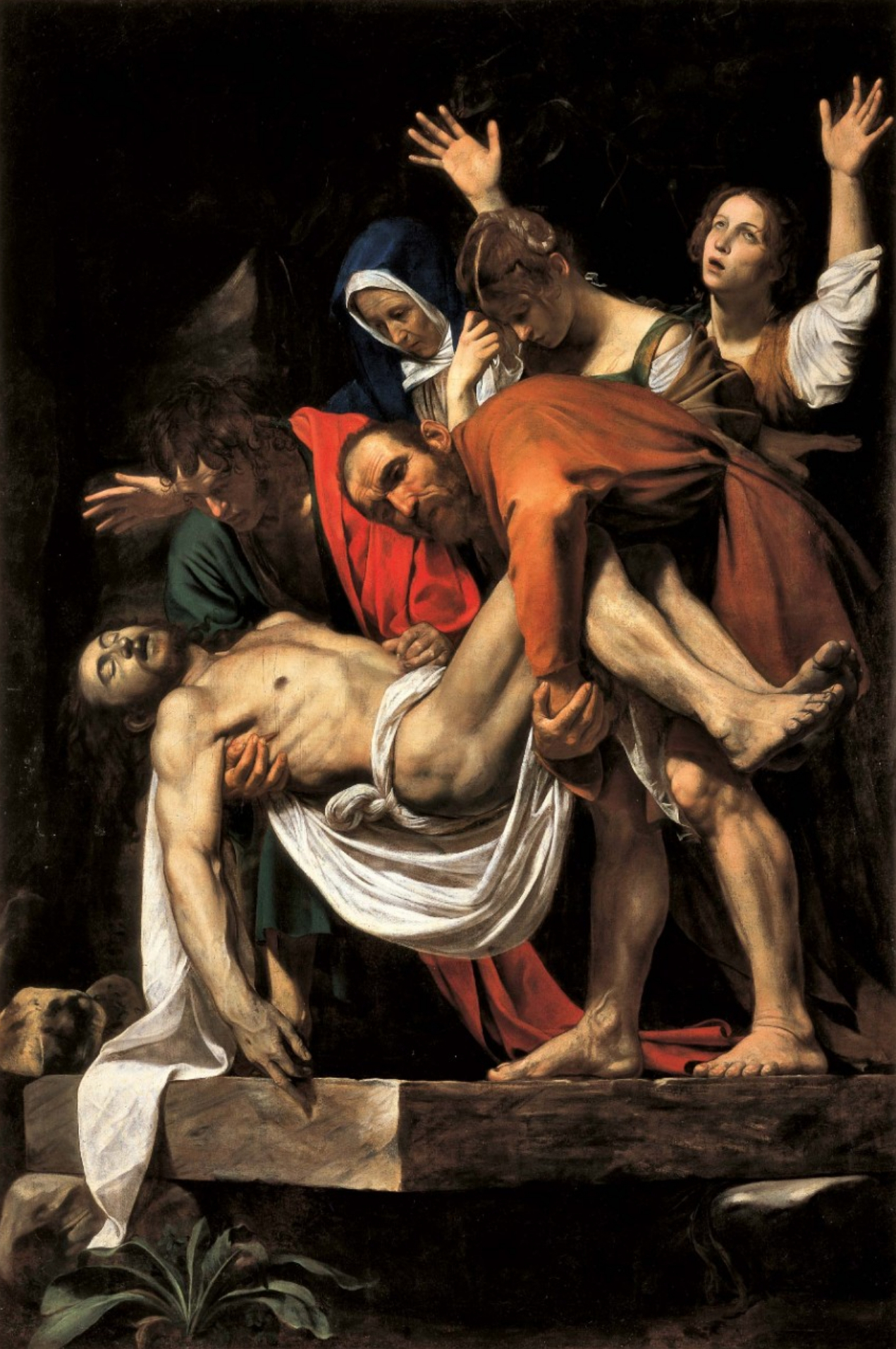
Caravaggio, The Entombment

The high altar of the St. Walburga Churchs stood high above an ancient Holy Sepulchre chapel restored in 1613. Rubens' triptych constituted a kind of reenactment of the journey from the Jerusalem Church of the Holy Sepulchre to the elevation of the Holy Cross in the Golgotha Chapel located above. The triptych represents the crucifixion of Jesus in line with the specific guidelines for artistic imagery as drawn up during the Council of Trent. Rubens reflects the spirit of the Counter-Reformation by representing the victorious nature of Jesus's death while maintaining his divine nature. It has been argued that Rubens is making a visual argument on human sin, judgment, the elevation of the cross, the plea for forgiveness, and the acts of penitence, which follows Johannes Herolt's collection of sermons from 1435, widely used in Rubens's time. Rubens contrasts Jesus's plea for forgiveness for his tormentors with the vengeance on mankind perpetrated by the gods from Antiquity which he references by basing some of the figures on Antique statues such as the Laocoön (Jesus's facial expression is based on the father figure), the Niobids and the Farnese Bull.

In 1733, the church administrators wished to have a new altar built. They asked and obtained a license to sell the three small pictures placed under the central panel. In 1737, the three figures that surmounted the triptych were sold to the Stock Exchange of Antwerp. The painter-sculptor Willem Ignatius Kerricx, who built the new altar, had it surmounted with an arcaded structure and covered the bottom of this pediment with a painting by his own hand. The predellas were bought by private persons and their current whereabout are unknown.

== Influences ==
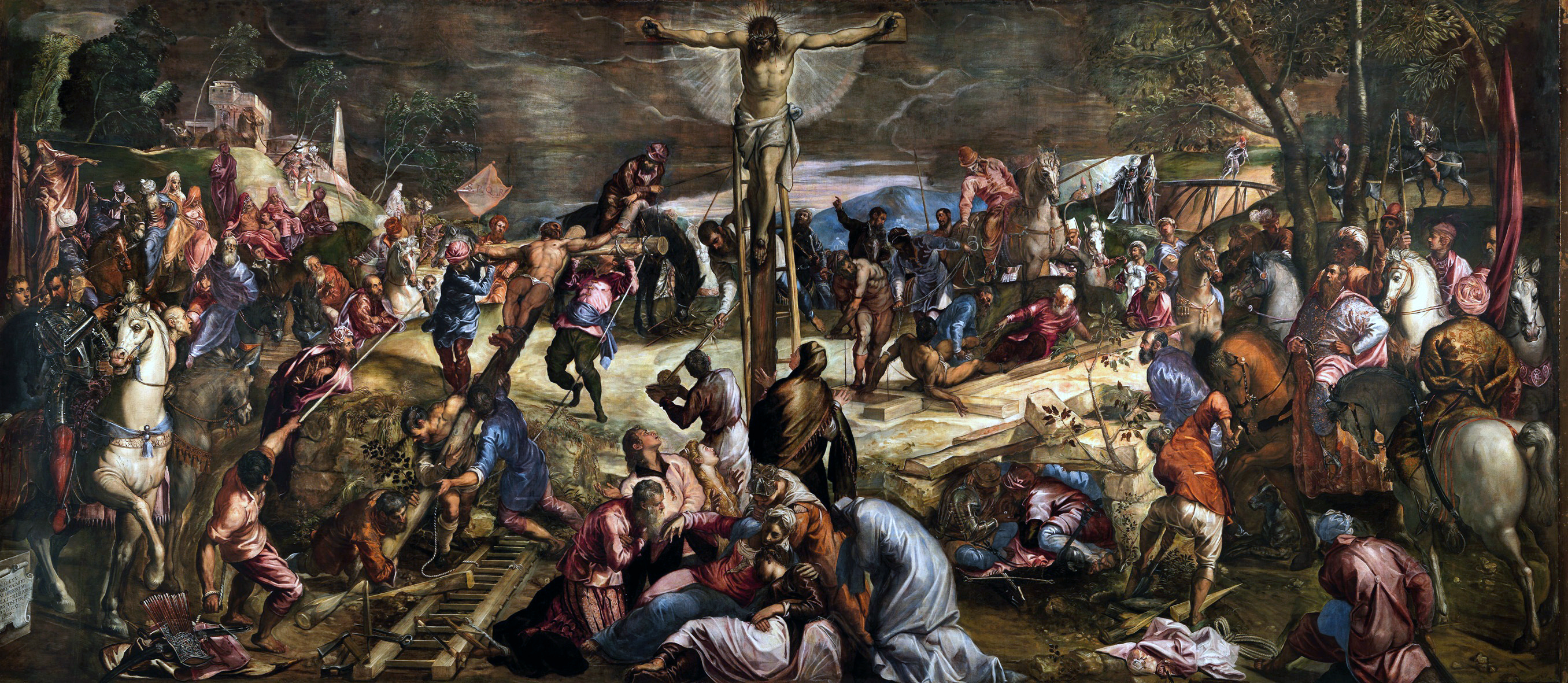
Jacopo Tintoretto, Crucifixion

For the muscular figures and their poses Rubens drew inspiration from the Antique sculptures of the (Laocoön, Niobids, Farnese Bull) which he studied and drew during his stays in Rome. The influence of Italian Renaissance and Baroque artists such as Michelangelo, Tintoretto and Caravaggio are also apparent, particularly in the composition, palette and light effects.

Rubens clearly took inspiration from Tintoretto's Crucifixion in the Scuola di San Rocco in Venice. In Tintoretto's work Jesus's cross is already raised while that of one of the thieves is being raised. Rubens borrows from Tintoretto the arrangement of pulling, pushing and lifting men around the cross being raised. Where the men in Tintoretto's canvas are carpenters as indicated by their craftsmen tools and garments, the muscular men in Rubens's executioners are violent in their movement, drawn together in a tight group around Jesus and driven by the sole passion of murdering Jesus. Rubens's version creates a more compelling, intense and emotional response by changing the position of Jesus's body. Rubens's use of foreshortening in the contortions of the struggling, strapping men is reminiscent of Tintoretto. He has also borrowed other themes in Tintoretto's composition such as the huddled group of mourners at the foot of the cross and the officers on horseback. Jesus cuts across the central panel diagonally, akin to Caravaggio's Entombment where both descent and ascent are in play at a key moment. Rubens's use of tenebrism shows the influence of Caravaggio. Jesus's perfectly molded body alludes to the nude figures painted by Michelangelo on the ceilings of the Sistine Chapel.

== Provenance and history of the work ==
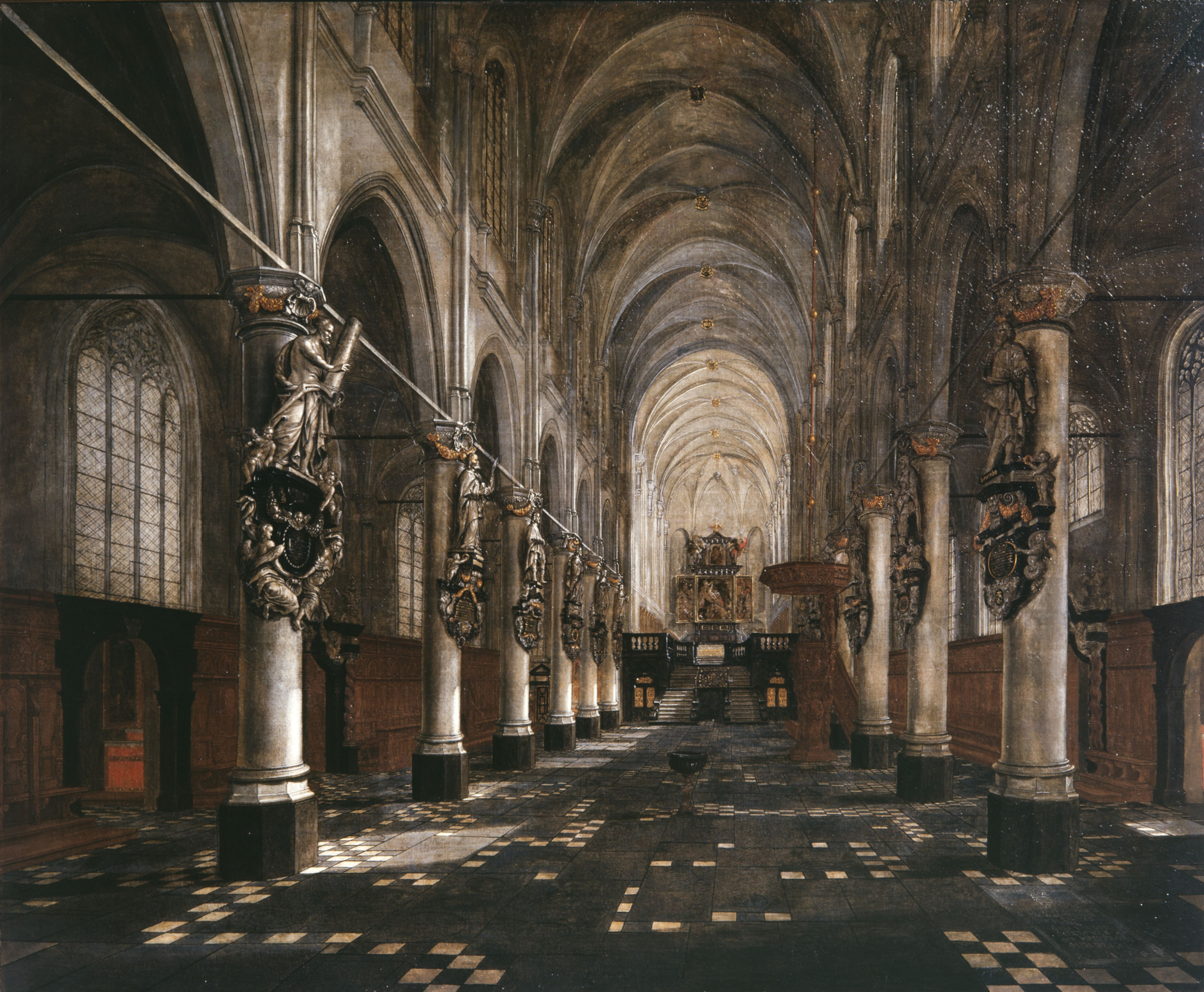
Interior of the St. Walburga Church by Anton Gunther Gheringh (mid 17th c.)

Rubens was commissioned to paint the triptych by the church authorities of the St. Walburga Church in Antwerp. Cornelis van der Geest, a wealthy spice merchant and churchwarden of the St. Walburga Church, secured the commission for Rubens and bore most of the costs of the purchase.

The St. Walburga Church was closed after French Revolutionary armies occupied Antwerp in 1693. The triptych was taken to Paris in 1794, along with Rubens's The Descent from the Cross. The artwork was returned to Antwerp at the end of the Napoleonic Wars in 1815, but since the Church of St. Walburga had become a ruin and was later demolished, it was placed in the Cathedral of Our Lady in Antwerp.

The Elevation of The Cross and the Descent From The Cross were removed a second time in 1914 when the German occupiers took them to the Berlin Palace in Berlin. They were returned to the Cathedral after the Armistice of 11 November 1918.

== Rubens's design of the work and the role of his workshop ==
The period after Rubens' return to Antwerp was a particularly busy time for the painter, as he had taken on various responsibilities other than painting. He was head of a workshop in which pupils, assistants and collaborators played an important role in the execution of commissions. Rubens did all the sketches and designs for the works being created in his workshop.

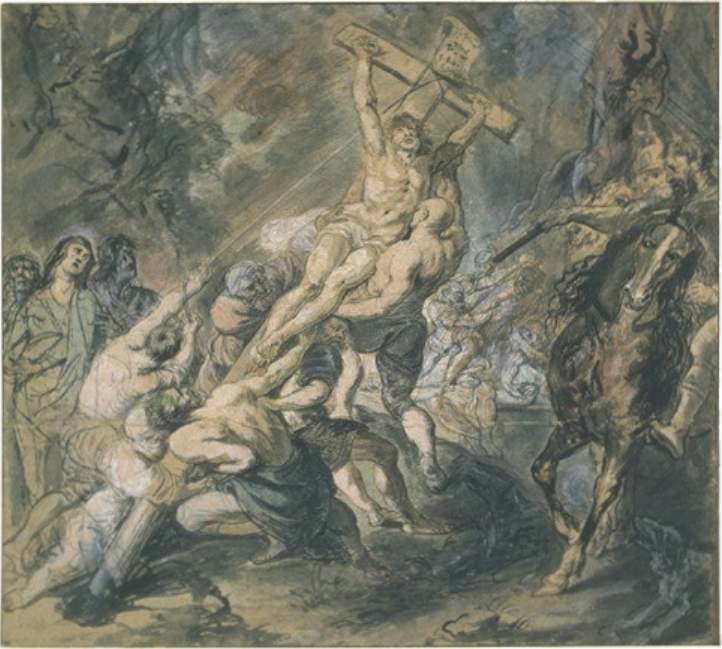
Preparatory drawing, Louvre

Rubens started the creative process for the Elevation of the Cross with a sketch of the general view of the composition. This first sketch, in the collection of the Louvre (INV 20188, Recto), shows the cross cutting the panel from the lower left to the upper right. Six men are striving to raise it. Mary and the apostle John watch the spectacle from the left while Roman soldiers stand on the other side. Next Rubens made a painted sketch (Louvre, MNR 411) in which he divided the scene over three panels in the same frame, but separated. This sketch is already close to the final treatment in the finished altarpiece and has the cross cutting the central panel from bottom right to upper left. As he was commissioned to paint a triptych, Rubens was compelled to divide his picture into three parts. The narrowness of the shutters obliged him to significantly condense the groups on the side panels as a result of which they lost their close connection with the principal scene.

Called a modello, Rubens would have provided this oil sketch to the patrons who commissioned the work so that they could provide comments on the overall story and imagery, especially paying attention to the iconographic details. The modello also served as a model for the assistants to prepare for the execution of the work. Some iconographic changes from the modello were made in the execution of Elevation of the Cross. The position of the cross was adjusted. In the background of the central panel and the right panel of the modello there was a scene of Jesus and the other criminals being led by Roman soldiers to the execution ground. This scene was not included in the final version.

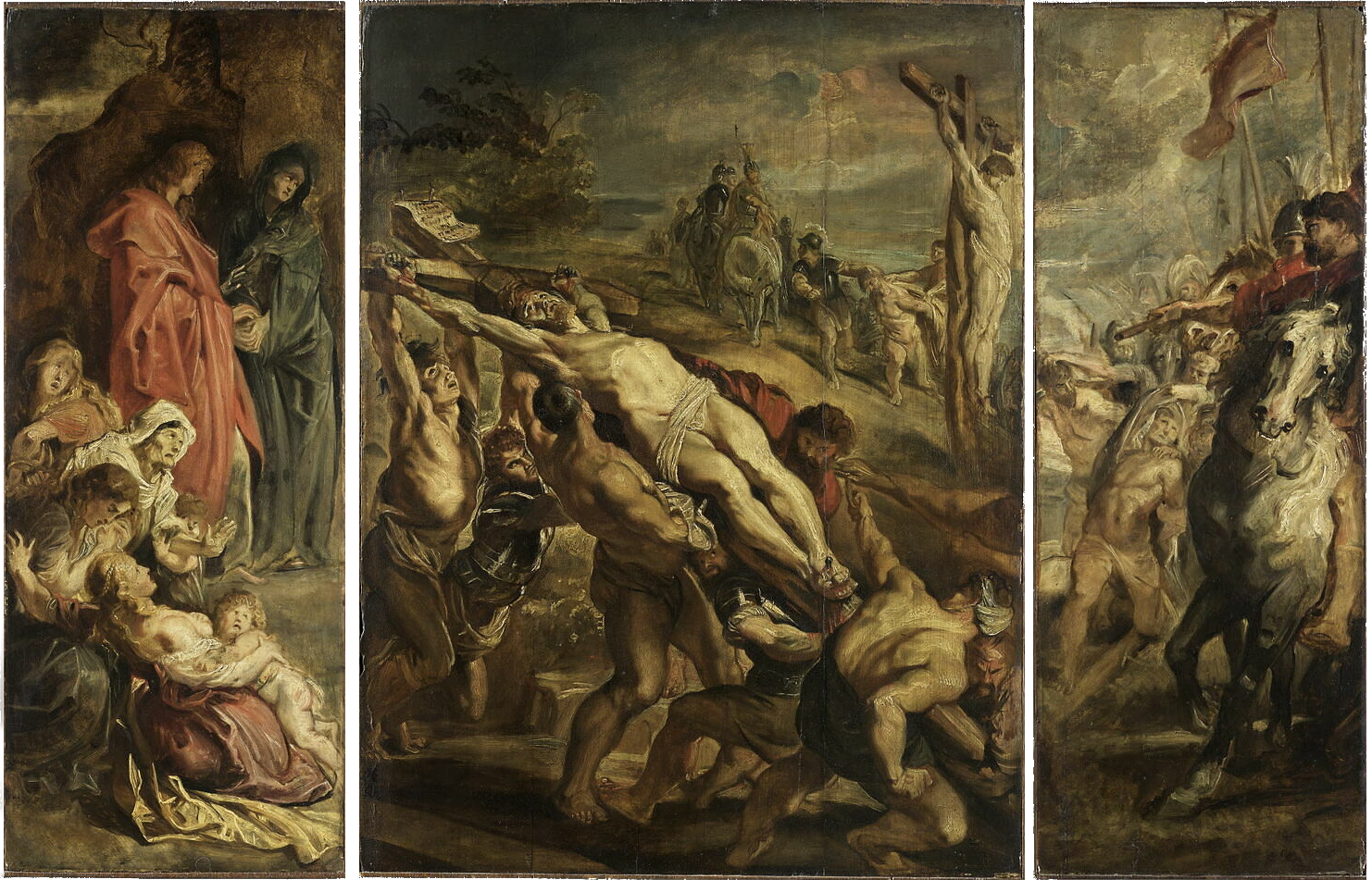
Modello for the triptych in the Louvre

Once his workshop assistants had marked the general composition on the panels, Rubens turned his attention towards the human figures. In this stage, Rubens used chalk to make drawings with live models present, positioning the models in the various poses as predetermined in the modello. These separate drawings were used in conjunction with the modello in the final execution of the large scale painting. A large preparatory study drawing for the triptych has been preserved (Sotheby's auction of 30 January 2019, New York, lot 15). It depicts a nearly nude muscular young man, who is straining to push a heavy weight above his head. In the finished triptych, the figure appears as a soldier, clad in armour, with features resembling those of Rubens himself. Making large-scale, nude or near-nude individual figure studies in chalk for figures that would subsequently appear clothed in the final composition was a practice that Rubens learned during his stay in Italy. It is believed that the painting of the triptych itself was all by Rubens's own hand.

Rubens had in the original contract promised to retouch his work in due time. In 1627, he restored the work to it pristine freshness and he is believed not to have made any revisions to the original design during that restoration. This is corroborated by the fact that the execution of the work is unified and entirely in the manner of his early work, a little dry in touch and rather grey-brown in tone.

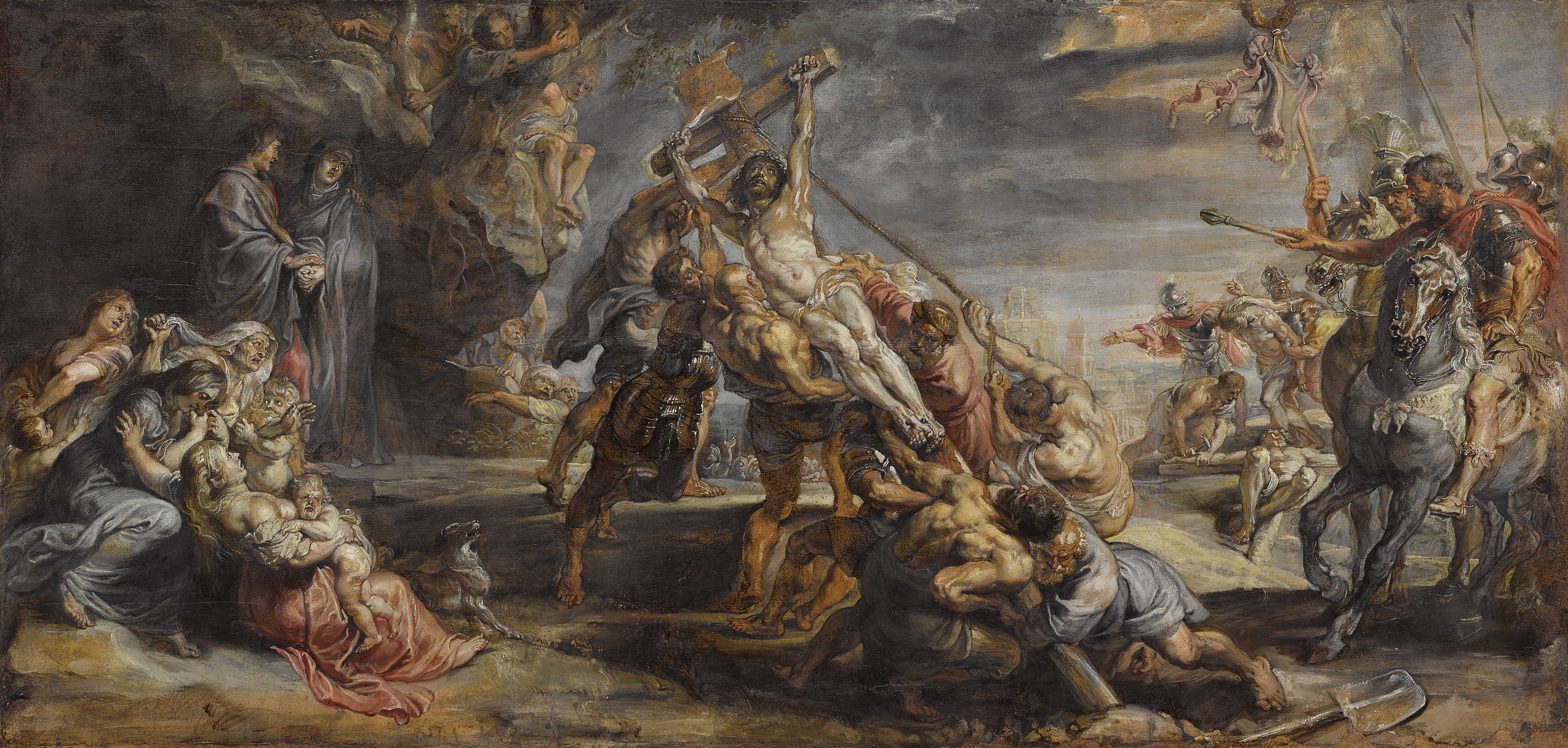
The Raising of the Cross (1638), Art Gallery of Ontario

== Reduced version ==
Rubens painted around 1638 a reduced version of The Elevation of the Cross in oil on paper. It originally measured 60 × 126.5 cm, but was later enlarged to 70 × 131.5 cm. This smaller painting represents a modified version of the obverse side of the earlier triptych. The pentimenti discovered during the restoration of the painting show that Rubens creatively reworked his original composition. The painting served as a modello for the engraver Hans Witdoeck who engraved it. The print was made on three plates and was dedicated to the patron who had paid for the original triptych, Cornelis van der Geest, who had died on 10 March 1638. He is described in the inscription on the print as 'The best of men and oldest of friends, in whom ever since youth he found a steadfast patron.'

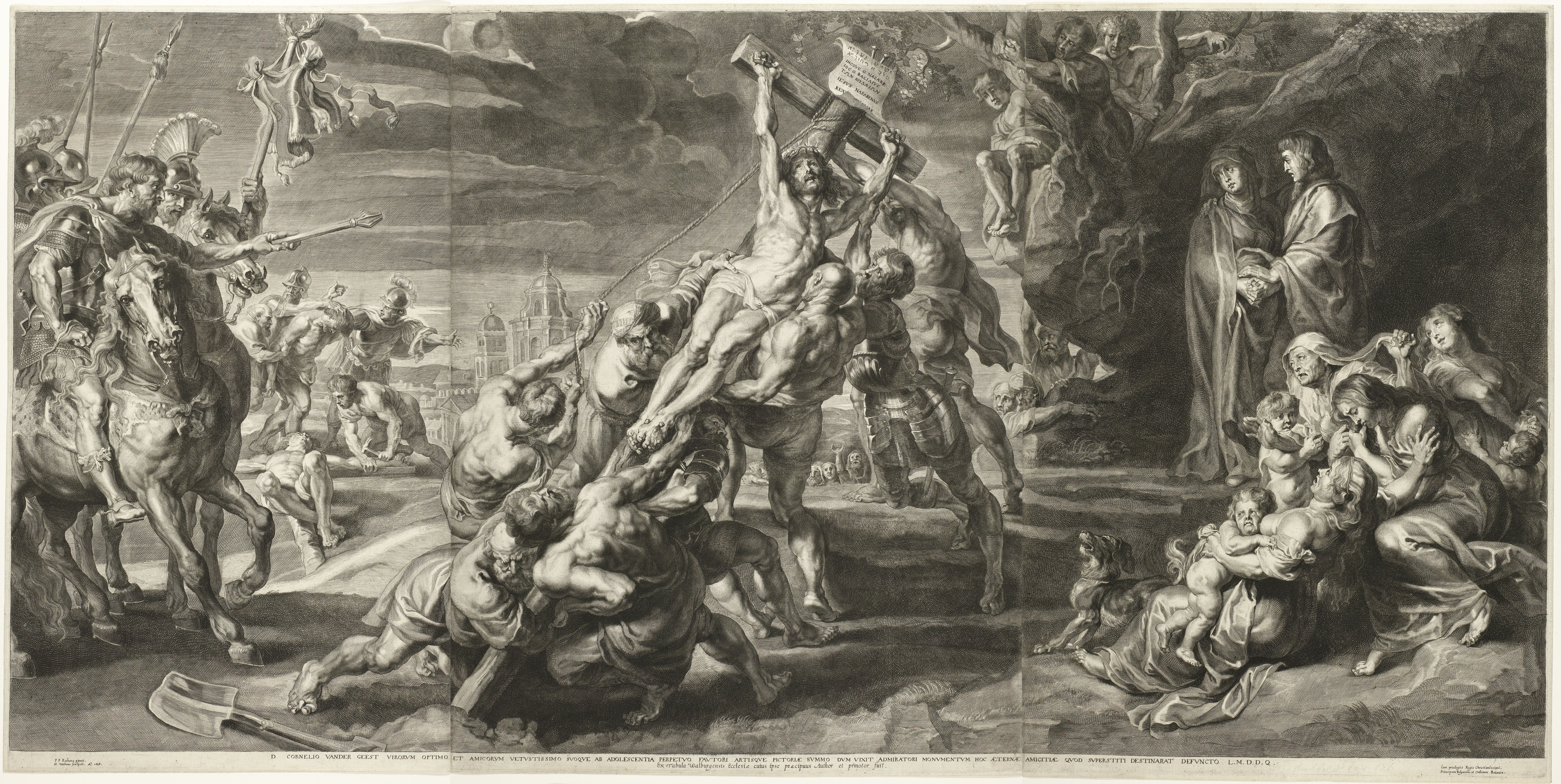
The Raising of the Cross by Witdoeck

The smaller painting differs from the original as it combines the three panels into one canvas and colour accents are added throughout the composition. The removal of the breaks has created a more cohesive scene. Figures not seen in the earlier version are added as well as some changes made to the landscape where a city is now visible in the background. Due to its size, some have suggested the painting may have been conceived as an independent painting to The Elevation of the Cross, to be given as a personal gift to Cornelis van der Geest. The painting is now in the Art Gallery of Ontario's permanent collection, after it was purchased from George Holford in 1928.
