= St. Walburga Church, Antwerp =

Former church in Antwerp, Belgium

Coordinates: 51°13′19.34″N 4°23′48.78″E

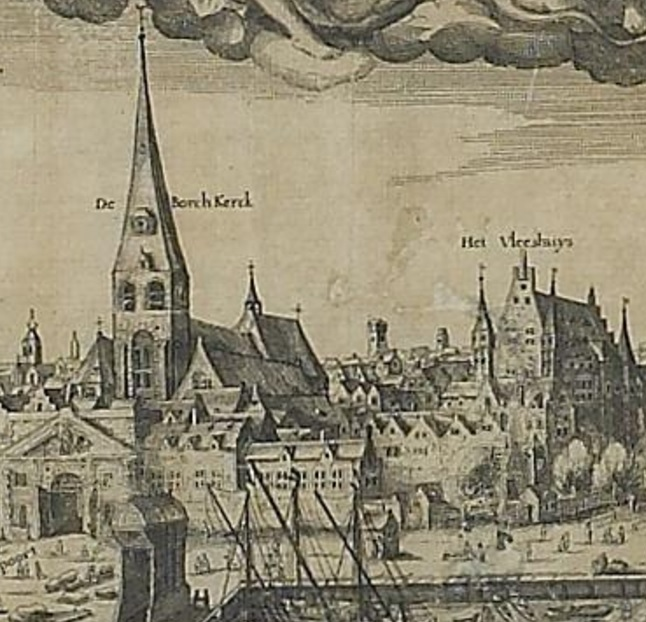
Panorama of Antwerp showing St. Walburga Church, early 17th century

St. Walburga Church (Dutch: Sint-Walburgiskerk) or Burchtkerk was a Roman Catholic parish church in Antwerp, modern-day Belgium. It was demolished in 1817.

== Early history ==
The church's history predates the 8th century. The very first chapel built within the walls on the right bank of the Scheldt dates from 727, and was destroyed by the Normans in 836. In 900 a new burcht was built on the same spot with a new church, dedicated to Saint Walburga, next to the fortress Het Steen. Under the direction of the Affligem monks the church was rebuilt in 1250, and in 1478 it became a parish church, also receiving a baptismal font and the right to bury. Another renovation, directed by architect Domien de Waghemakere around 1500, further enlarged the church.

== Interior ==
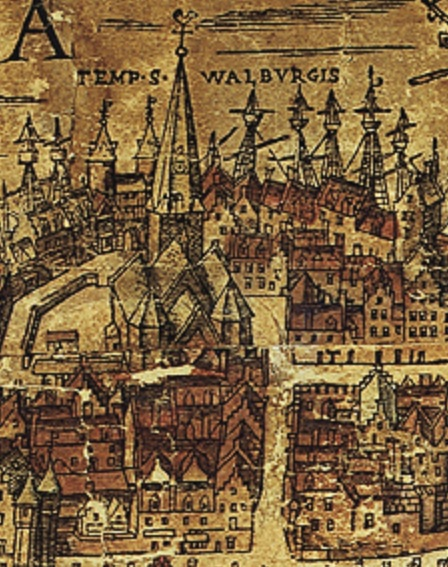
St. Walburga Church, 1565

In 1609 the church council asked Peter Paul Rubens to paint a triptych for the church. His Elevation of the Cross was completed in 1610 and incorporated into the main altar. When in 1734 the old wooden altar was demolished and replaced by a stone altar made by Willem Ignatius Kerricx, smaller parts of Rubens's triptych were sold because they did not fit the new altar. The first mass at the high altar took place on 11 June 1737. The triptych was removed in 1794 by French occupying forces and taken to Paris, and was later returned to Antwerp's Cathedral of Our Lady.

== Closing, demolition ==
In 1798 the church fell victim to the French urge to close monasteries and churches, and that same year the Antwerp diocese was abolished. The church was used as a warehouse. The choir, including a covered walkway to Het Steen, was retained for a while but in 1816 the church was sold, and demolished the year after. The last remains of it were destroyed by fire.

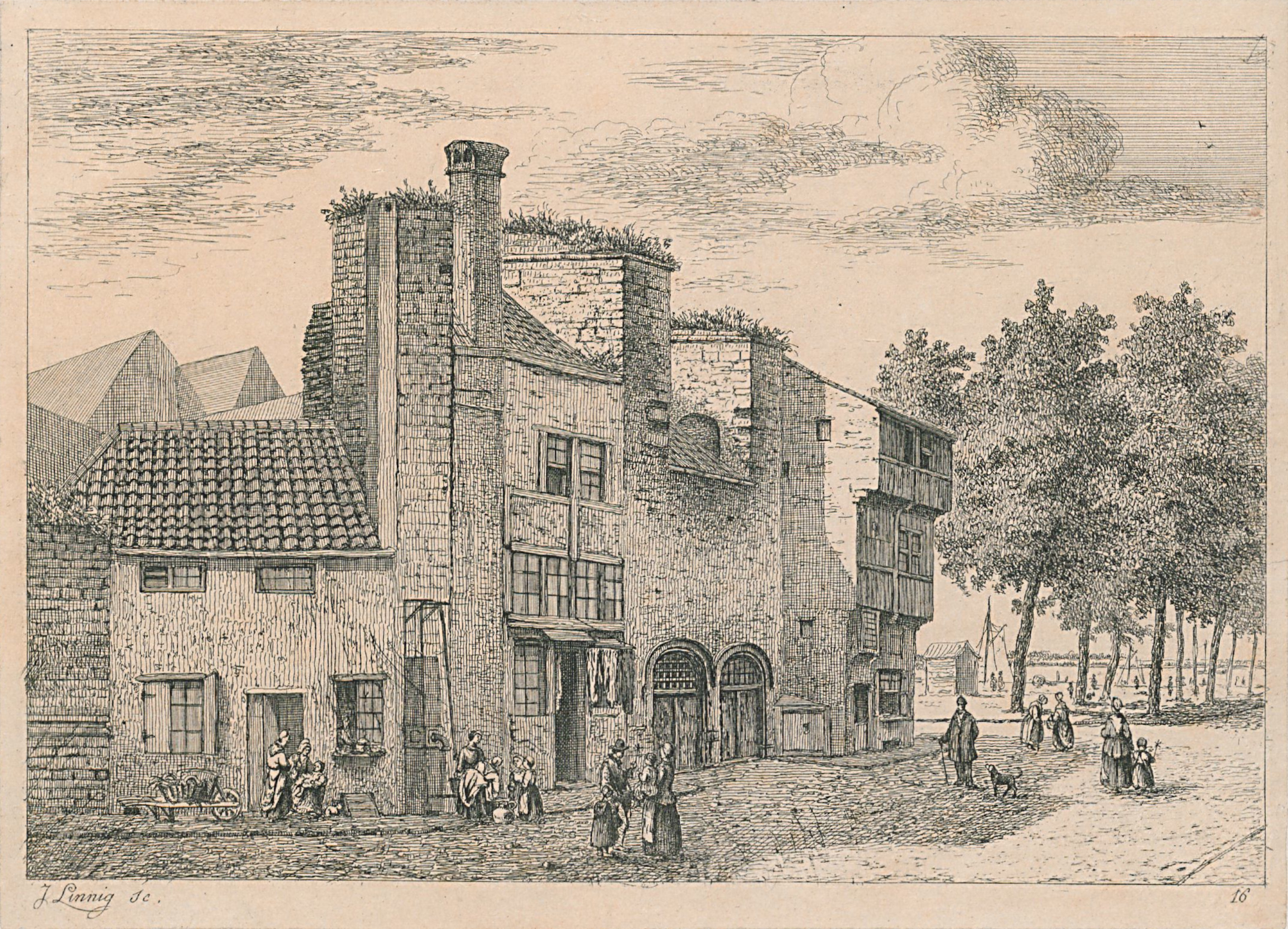
Ruins of the St. Walburga Church by Jozef Linnig

In the meantime the St. Paul's Church had been designated as the parish church. The removal of the St. Walburga Church left an open space, now called the Burchtplein, on which a statue to Peter Paul Rubens was placed. When the banks of the Scheldt river were straightened, the square disappeared and the statue was moved to the Groenplaats.

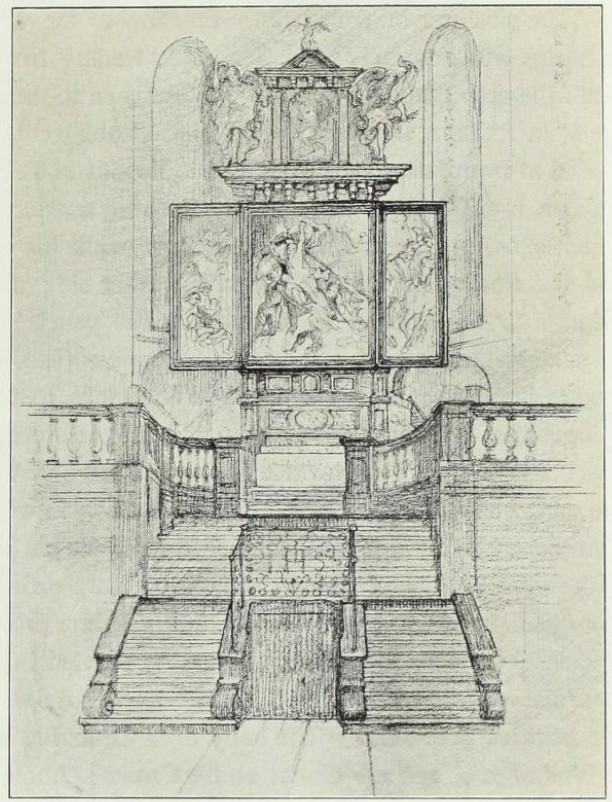
High Altar of the St Walburga Church with Raising of the Cross by Rubens by Piet Verhaert after an old painting

The predella of the main altar representing the Raising of the brass snake made by Willem Ignatius Kerricx was reused for the main altar of the Antwerp Cathedral. The cathedral also holds the two marble medallions represenintg Saint Walburga and Saint Eligius, which Kerricx has produced for the altar in the church. Another altar was moved to the Saint Dionysius church in Tilburg, where it became the high altar. In 1936, a new, modernist church with the same name was built by Flor Van Reeth in the Zuid neighborhood of Antwerp.

== Burials ==
- Joannes I Goubau, Lord of Saint-Fontaine, (1503-1581): marr. Joanne Cossiers.
- Abrahem van Horne, marr. Barbe van den Gouwen.
- Michiel Cornelissen Stellenaer, capteyn.
- Jan Pieter van Baurscheit the Elder.
