= Coxie =

Coxie is a Flemish surname. Notable people with this surname include:

- Albert de Coxie (died 1709), Spanish Netherlands politician
- Damonte Coxie (born 1996), American Canadian football player
- Jan Anthonie Coxie (c. 1660–1720), Flemish painter
- Jan Coxie (1629–1670), Flemish painter
- Michiel Coxie (1499–1592), Flemish painter
- Raphael Coxie (c. 1540–1616), Flemish painter
