= Charles Emmanuel Biset =

Flemish painter

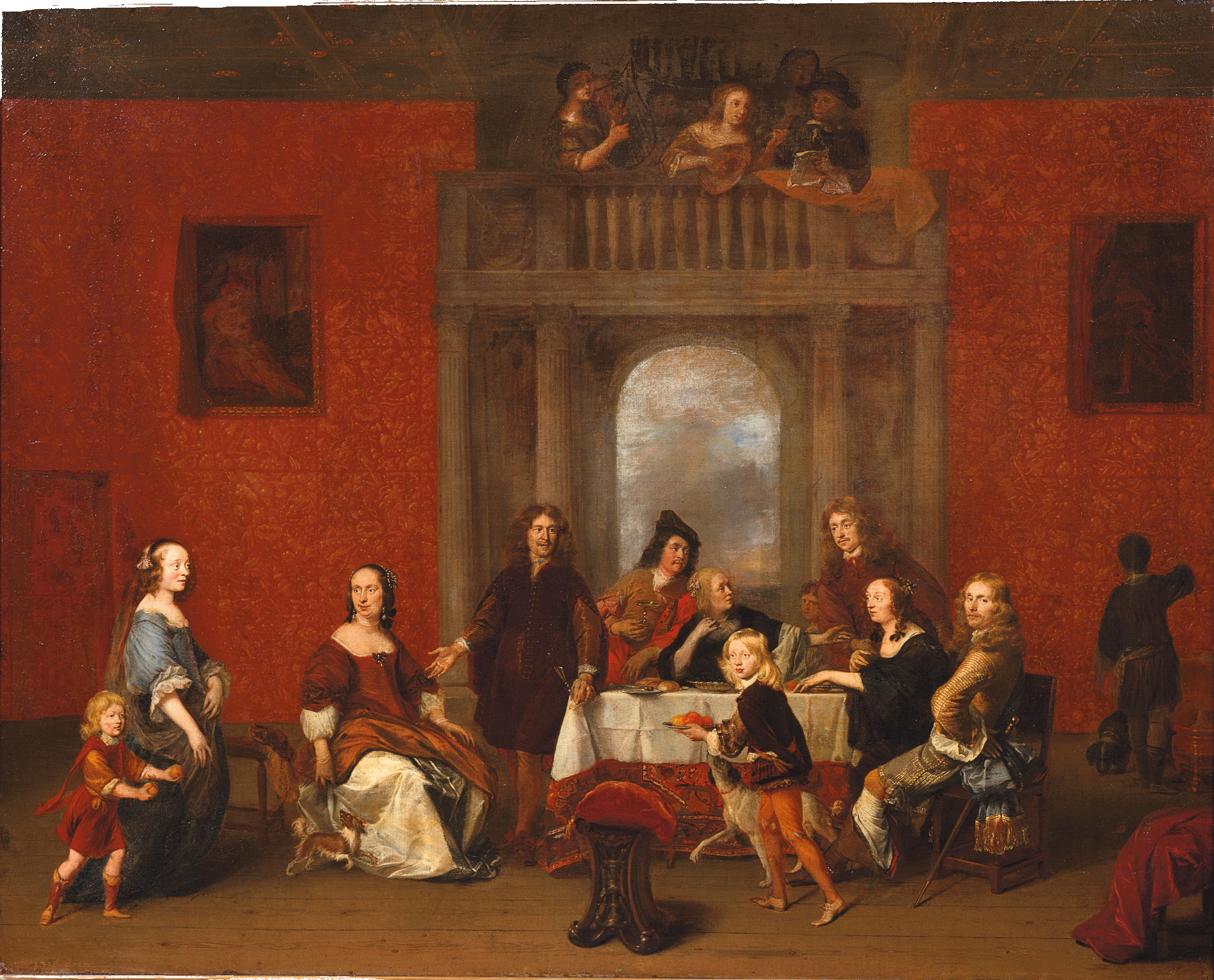
Portrait of a family in an interior

Charles Emmanuel Biset or Karel Emmanuel Biset (26 December 1633 – 19 October 1707) was a Flemish painter who had a peripatetic career working in various cities and countries including his hometown Mechelen, Paris, possibly in Annonay (France), Brussels, Antwerp and Breda. He worked in many genres including genre scenes of interiors with merry companies and gallery paintings, history painting, portraiture and possibly still lifes.

== Life ==
Charles Emmanuel Biset was born on 26 December 1633 in Mechelen as Karel Emmanuel Biset. He was the son of the decorative painter Joris Biset who had trained under Michiel Coxie III, a grandson of the great Renaissance painter Michiel Coxie. Charles Emmanuel Biset likely trained under his father.

He worked in Mechelen from about 1640 until the early or mid-1650s. He was subsequently active in Paris where he is presumed to have worked for the court. Thereafter he is recorded for a while in Brussels as a court painter before moving to Antwerp. Here he was active from 1661 to 1687. He became a master in Antwerp's Guild of Saint Luke in 1662. He married in 1662 with the painter Maria van Uden who was the daughter of the landscape painter Lucas van Uden. He became a poorter (citizen) of Antwerp on 20 April 1663. On 17 December of the same year he was admitted to the local civil militia and served as a lieutenant under Captain Sebastiaen de Neve of the Oude Handboog militia.

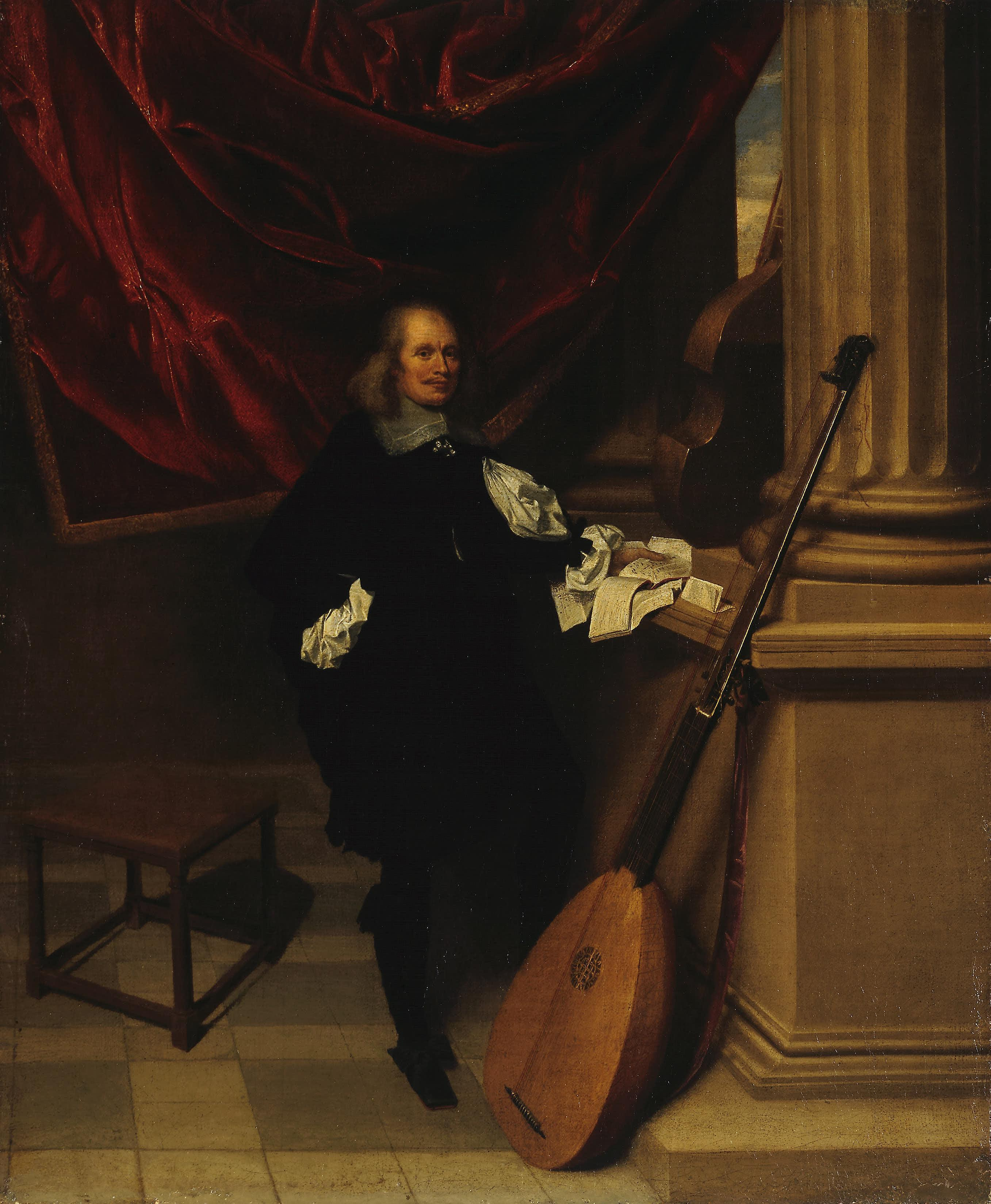
Portrait of a Musician

After the death of his first wife on 4 August 1665, he began a relationship with her sister Anna, with whom he had a daughter Dorothea born out of wedlock on 19 December 1666. Rather than marrying Anna he went to look for a rich bride in his city of birth Mechelen. On 20 June 1670 he married in the St. Rumbold's Cathedral of Mechelen Anna Cleymans, daughter of Master Willem en Catharina van Lijn. Their son Jan Andreas (or Jan Baptista Andreas) was baptized on 5 January 1672 and would become a painter, mainly active in the Dutch Republic.

He enjoyed the patronage of Juan Domingo de Zuñiga y Fonseca, Count of Monterrey and later the Governor of the Habsburg Netherlands for whom he may have worked on a quasi-exclusive basis for a while.He was appointed a director of the Academy of Antwerp. His works were already highly sought after. In June 1671, the Duke of Orleans purchased four paintings by Biset in Antwerp through an agent. On 18 September 1674, he became dean of the guild and director of the academy. On October 6 of the same year, he bought a house, which soon became heavily burdened with debt, as he was a slow (and according to the biographer Jacob Campo Weyerman, a lazy) painter. In 1682, he painted a portrait of the former Governor of the Habsburg Netherlands Alexander Farnese, Prince of Parma and his son.

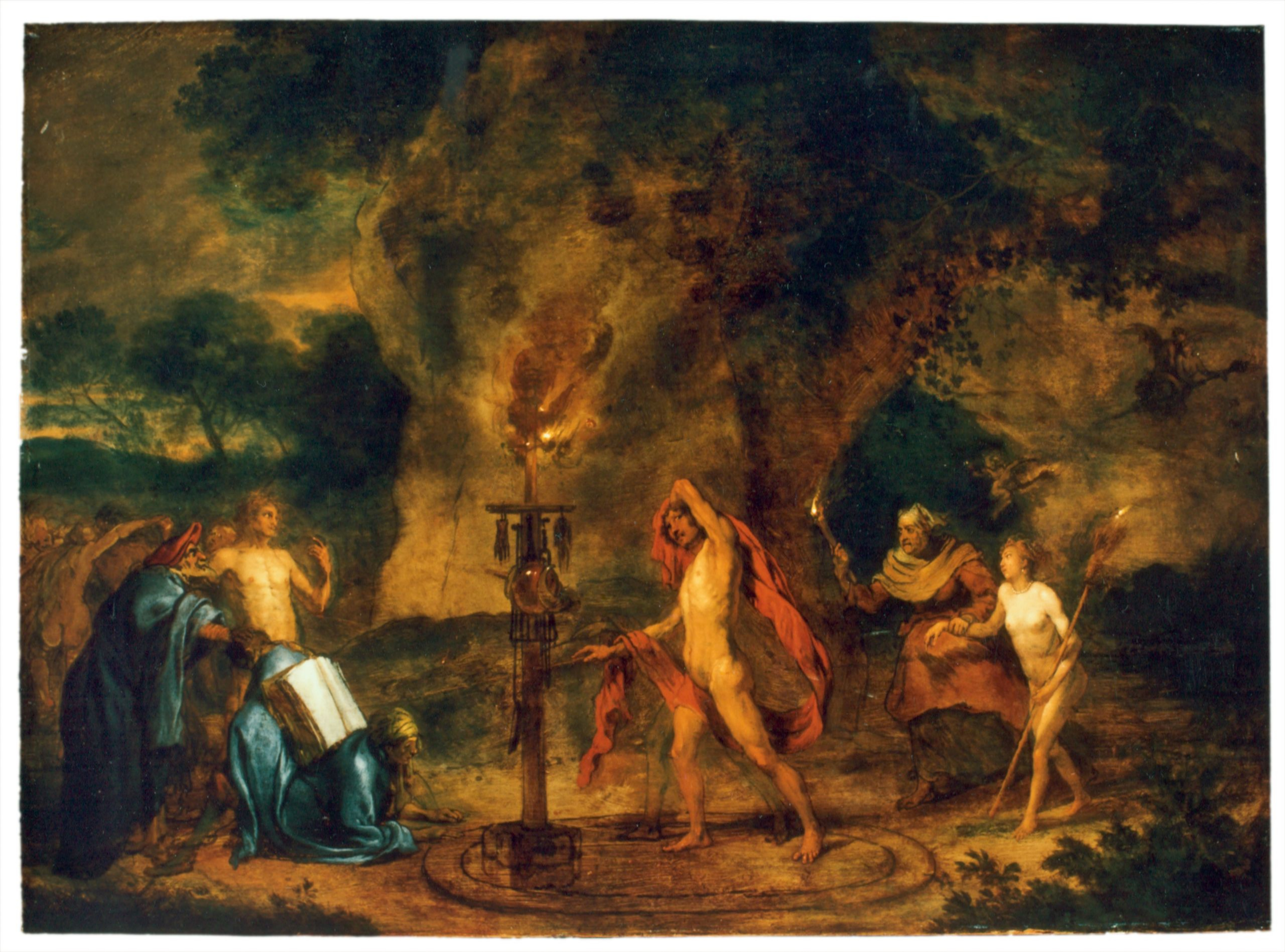
Magicians and witches during a Black Mass in front of a cave

His financial situation deteriorated and in December 1682 he is reported as being ill. Nevertheless, he married on 12 December 1682 in Antwerp his maid Joanna van de Velde. She gave birth to a daughter Katharina on 5 July 1683 and a son Jan Karel (later a painter) on 14 September 1686. His house was sold by the court on 1 February 1686. In 1687 he is recorded as having settled in Breda. It is possible he stayed there for the rest of his life while visiting Antwerp occasionally. The last record of his life dates to 28 September 1693 when he was in Antwerp.

He died on 19 October 1707 in Breda.

He was the master of his nephew Jan Anthonie Coxie, who was the son of his sister Joanna and fellow Mechelen painter Jan Coxie.

Biset was highly regarded as an artist in his time as is attested by the fact that both the early Flemish biographer Cornelis de Bie and the Dutch biographer Jacob Campo Weyerman included him in their artist biographies.

== Work ==
=== General ===
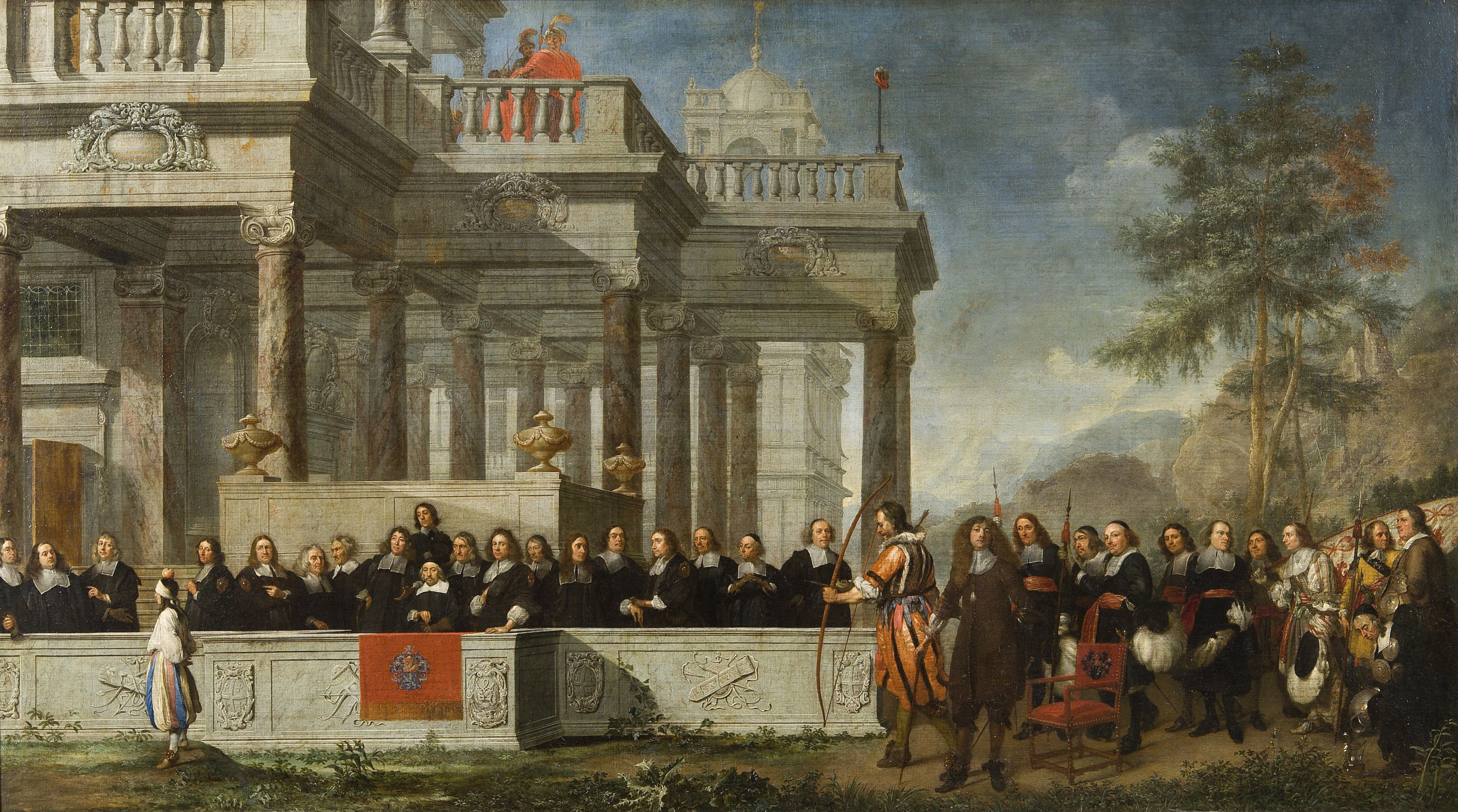
The Legend of William Tell shown to the Antwerp Schutterij of St Sebastian

Biset was a very versatile artist and the range of his work is very diverse: he painted genre scenes with merry companies, gallery paintings, portraits, history paintings and possibly still lifes. Because of this diversity and the specific genres and themes he worked in, it is believed he may have received some training from Gonzales Coques who also painted in such diverse areas. He signed 'C.E. Biset'.

Biset is regarded by some art historians as a follower of Coques. In fact, some works now ascribed to Biset were formerly attributed to Coques. This is for instance the case with the composition Family Seated at a Table in an Elegant Garden Exterior (Sotheby's, 6 December 2006 in New York, lot 7), which was originally regarded as a collaboration between Gonzales Coques and some specialist artists such as Peeter Gijsels and Wilhelm Schubert van Ehrenberg but is regarded by the RKD specialists as entirely by Biset's hand.

As was the custom in Antwerp in the 17th century Biset regularly collaborated with other painters who were specialists in a particular genre. Collaborations with the landscape painters Philips Augustijn Immenraet and Cornelis Huysmans and the architecture painter Wilhelm Schubert van Ehrenberg are recorded.

=== Portraits ===
Biset painted individual as well as family and group portraits, including merry companies. The Hermitage collection holds a beautiful Portrait of a Musician. It depicts a musician standing next to a column with some sheet music and a theorbo and viola da gamba resting against the column. The figure dressed in black is set off against the velvet curtain behind him. A stool placed next to the musician indicates that he has just finished or is about to commence a musical performance.

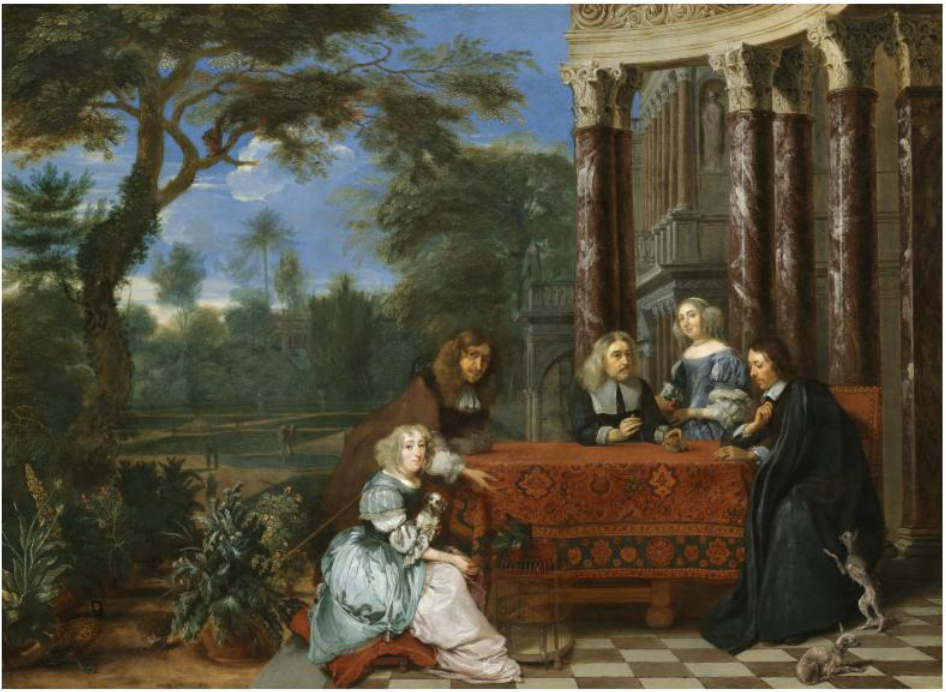
Family Seated at a Table in an Elegant Garden Exterior

The headmen of the Antwerp schutterij De Oude Voetboog are known to have ordered a group portrait from Biset. It is likely that this work is the large composition referred to as The Legend of William Tell shown to the Antwerp Schutterij of St Sebastian. This work, which is now in the Royal Museums of Fine Arts of Belgium, was made for the hall of the Antwerp schutterij pursuant to a contract made before a notary on 28 April 1672. Biset had delayed the execution of the work for a long time The work is a collaboration with Philips Augustijn Immenraet and Wilhelm Schubert van Ehrenberg. The architecture is painted by Wilhelm Schubert van Ehrenberg and the landscape by Philips Augustijn Immenraet and the rest by Charles Emmanuel Biset. The composition uses the tale of William Tell to create a group portrait of the leading members of the schutterij.

The Portrait of a family in an interior (Sold at Christie's on 19 April 2007 in New York, lot 31) was originally attributed to Gerard Pietersz van Zijl but is now attributed to Biset. This composition follows the model of the merry companies with its informal setting which includes children and musicians. A less informal rendering of the same subject is in the Musée des Beaux-Arts de Nantes.

=== Genre scenes ===
Genre subjects involving indoor scenes of playing persons were quite popular in Flemish and Dutch painting in the 17th century and in particular among the so-called Caravaggists. Biset painted similar genre scenes an example of which is his composition the Tric-trac players (Statens Museum for Kunst).

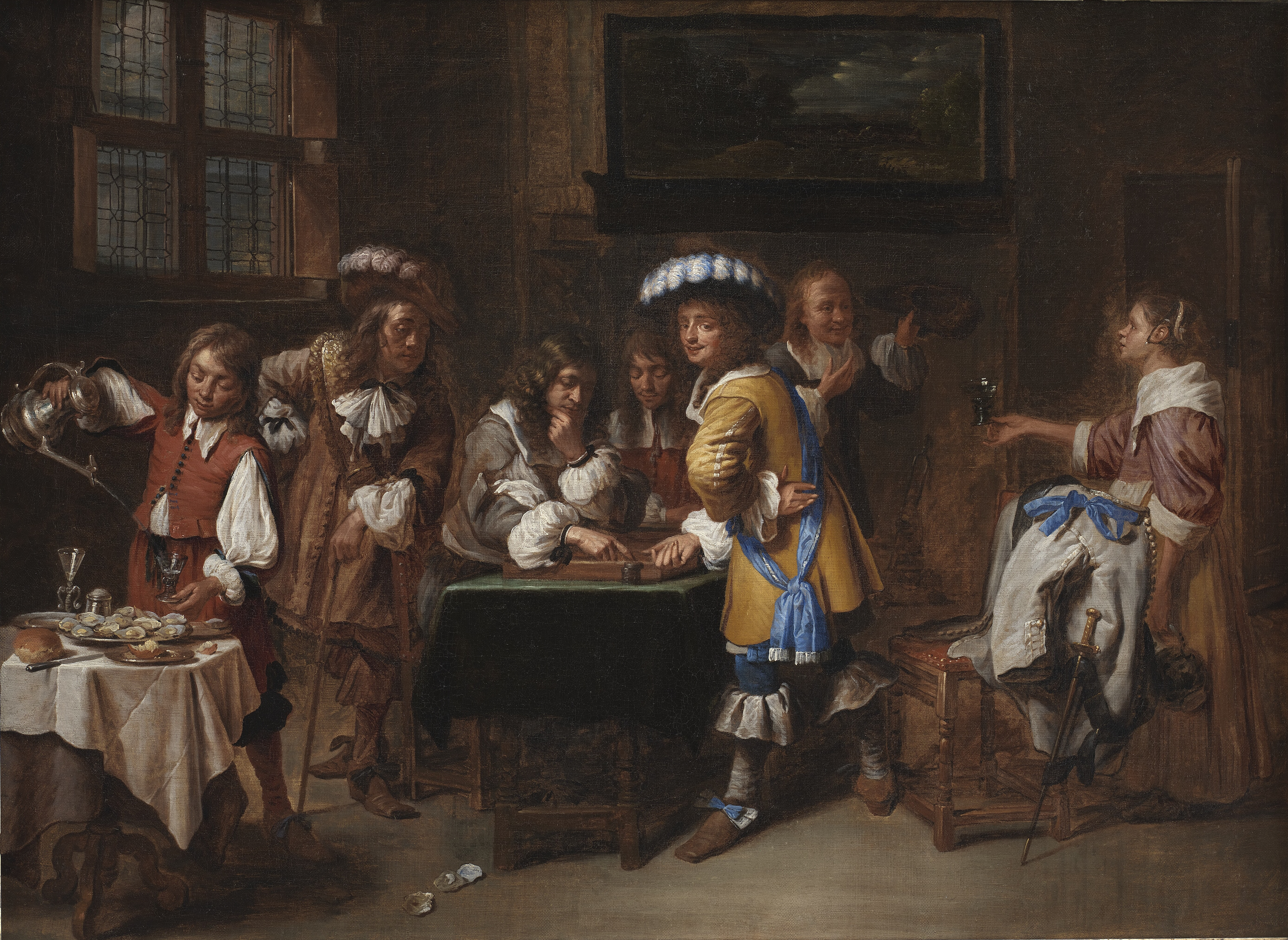
Tric-trac players

The composition shows an interior with two standing men playing tric-trac and three onlookers. One of the onlookers is engaged in a lively exchange with a maid who is handing him a glass of wine. A young male servant is pouring drinks for the company at a table on which also food is placed including oysters, a few of which have fallen on the floor. The overall setting seems to point to a company that is actively enjoying itself but may be on the verge of losing control.

=== Gallery paintings ===
Biset worked also in the genre of the 'gallery paintings'. The 'gallery paintings' genre is native to Antwerp where Frans Francken the Younger and Jan Brueghel the Elder were the first artists to create paintings of art and curiosity collections in the 1620s. Gallery paintings depict large rooms in which many paintings and other precious items are displayed in elegant surroundings. The earliest works in this genre depicted art objects together with other items such as scientific instruments or peculiar natural specimens. The genre became immediately quite popular and was followed by other artists such as Jan Brueghel the Younger, Cornelis de Baellieur, Hans Jordaens, David Teniers the Younger, Gillis van Tilborch and Hieronymus Janssens. The art galleries depicted were either real galleries or imaginary galleries, sometimes with allegorical figures.

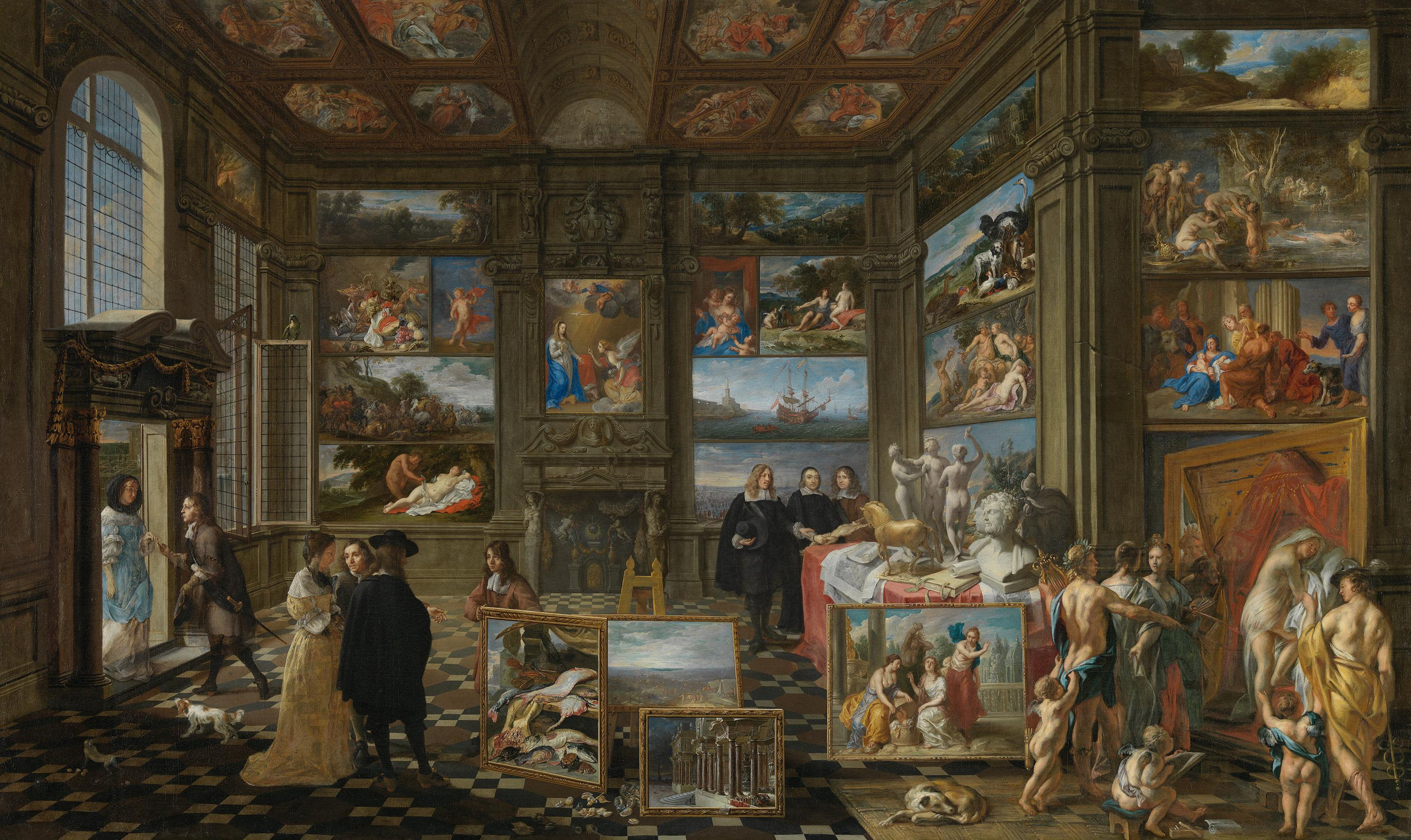
Interior of an Imaginary Picture Gallery

An example of Biset's work in this genre is the Interior of an Imaginary Picture Gallery (Alte Pinakothek, Munich) dated to 1666. This composition falls into the category of allegorical picture galleries, which can be considered a sub-category of the imaginary art gallery type. This composition depicts a large imaginary gallery in which are present a number of persons admiring and scrutinizing artworks and, on the right hand side, figures representing gods and allegorical figures. Wilhelm Schubert van Ehrenberg painted the architecture as well as the ceiling (which is made up of copies of Rubens' works for the Carolus Borromeuskerk in Antwerp) (later destroyed in a fire). The figures are believed to be by Charles Emmanuel Biset. The painting is a collaboration with each of the individual painters whose work is depicted in the painting and have signed their own work: Theodoor Boeyermans (Daughters of Cecrops and Erychtonius), Pieter Boel (Animal Piece), Jan Cossiers (Diana and Actaeon), Cornelis de Heem (Fruit Still Life), Robert van den Hoecke (Winter Landscape), Philips Augustijn Immenraet (Italianate Landscape), Jacob Jordaens (Gyges and Kandaules and Allegory of Painting), Pieter Thijs (Adoration of the Shepherds), Lucas van Uden (Landscape) and the monogrammists missed PB (Fish Still Life) and PVI or PVH (Satyr and Nymph). This type of painting can be regarded as a carefully crafted advertisement of the present talent and past legacy of the Antwerp school of painting.

=== Still lifes ===
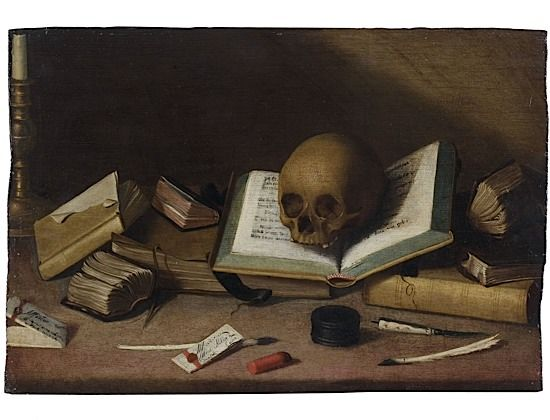
Still life with books and a skull

A number of still lifes with books are attributed to Biset. These attributions have not been universally accepted and some of these works have been attributed by some art historian to an obscure local French painter referred to as Jacques Bizet or Bizet d'Annonay. The work serving as the reference point of the attributions of still lifes to Biset is the Still life with old books in the Municipal Museum of Bourg-en-Bresse in Bourg-en-Bresse in France. This still life is signed at the bottom left on the letter 'A Monsieur (written in one word), Monsieur Bizet Anonnay'.

A Still life with books and a skull (Sold at Alain Truong, 18 December 2008 in Paris) has been attributed to Biset on the basis of its similarity with the still life in the Municipal Museum of Bourg-en-Bresse. The composition depicts a table on which rest a number of writing implements, some sealed letters and old books. On top of one book which is opened and appears to be handwritten rests a human skull. The message of the work appears to be that human endeavours as expressed in personal writings are futile as death is the ultimate outcome. These still lifes attributed to Bizet stand in a tradition of vanitas still lifes with books that was popular in Flemish and Dutch still life painting in the 17th century.

=== Book illustrations ===
Biset provided some designs for illustrations for a number of publications in Antwerp. This includes the book on mushrooms by the priest Franciscus van Sterbeeck entitled Theatrum fungorum oft het toneel der campernoelien ... vergaedert ende beschreven door Franciscus van Sterbeeck, which was published by Joseph Jacobs in Antwerp in 1675 and by the same author and publisher the Citricultura oft Regeringhe der uythemsche boomen te weten oranien, citroenen, limoenen, granaten, laurieren en andere on the cultivation of non-native trees, published in 1682 in Antwerp.
