= Jan Anthonie Coxie =

Flemish painter and draughtsman

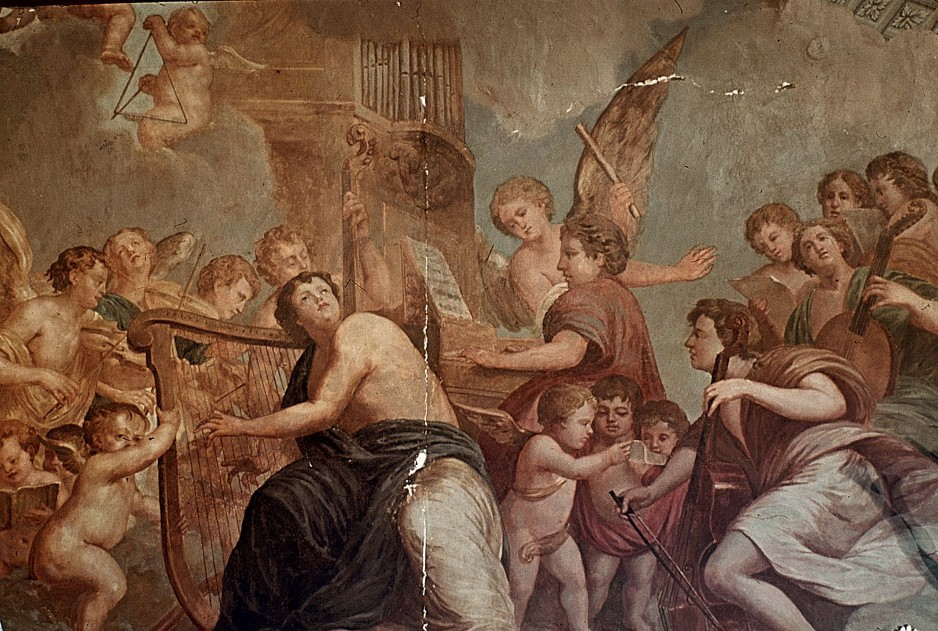
Concert of angels, Charlottenburg Palace

Jan Anthonie Coxie or Anthonie Coxie (c. 1660 – 1720) was a Flemish painter and draughtsman mainly known for his portrait and history paintings. After starting his career in Flanders he moved abroad and worked in Amsterdam, Berlin, Mainz and Milan where he worked for an elite clientele.

== Life ==
Coxie was born in Mechelen some time between 1650 and 1670 in an artistic family with a long tradition going back to the 16th century. His father was the landscape painter Jan Coxie who was a great-grandson of Michiel Coxie, one of the leading Flemish Renaissance painters who was known as the 'Flemish Raphael'. His father Jan married Jeanne Biset in 1650 or in 1667 according to different sources. Jan Anthonie had a brother, Jan Michiel, who also became a painter and with whom he is sometimes confused.

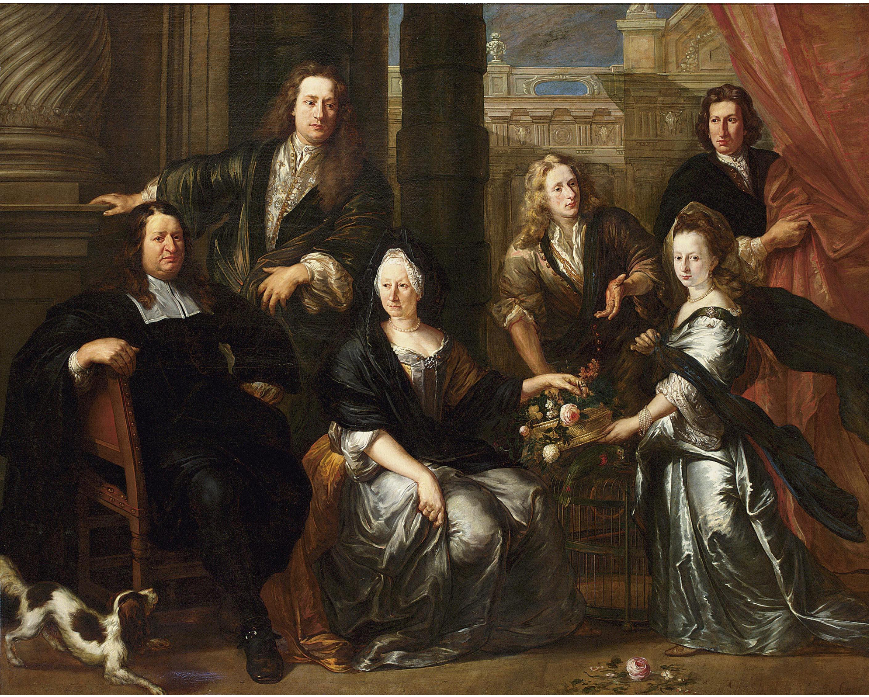
Portrait of the van Haecht family

Jan Anthonie studied with his father as well as with the prominent painter Charles Emmanuel Biset. Charles Emmanuel Biset was the brother of Jeanne Biset (Jan Anthonie's mother) and director of the Academy of Antwerp.

Jan Anthonie commenced his career in Mechelen around the year 1691. That year he was commissioned by the city of Mechelen to make a portrait of Charles II of Spain, the last Habsburg ruler of Spain and also ruler of the Southern Netherlands. In 1698 he painted the figures in a landscape made by Jacques d'Arthois for the St. James Church in Bruges.

From 1699 onwards he is recorded in Amsterdam. In 1703 he became poorter of Amsterdam. Wybrand de Geest (II) was his pupil. De Geest published in 1702 a book with engravings of Antique sculptures under the title Het Kabinet der Statuen ons van d’Aloudheid Nagelaten, which he dedicated to his master and friend Coxie. It is believed that Jan Anthonie Coxie is the Coxie that the early Dutch biographer Arnold Houbraken claimed had painted the grisaille representations of the liberal arts on the panels that covered a triptych made by Gerard Dou. This triptych was in the collection of William I of the Netherlands, but is now lost although a copy by Willem Joseph Laquy exists. The grisaille paintings by Coxie made clear that the three paintings by Gerard Dou, which depicted genre scenes, were in fact allegories of the liberal arts.

Although successful as testified by the praises sung of his work by local poets Sybrand Feitama and François Halma, he left Amsterdam and is recorded in Berlin from 1705 to 1708. He became the court painter of Frederick I of Prussia and decorated the ceilings of Charlottenburg Palace, the Berlin Palace and other residences of Frederick I with allegorical scenes praising the deeds of the king. He painted the walls and an altarpiece in the Chapel at Charlottenburg Palace.

After the death of his patron, Coxie left Berlin for Mainz in 1713. Here he worked for the court. He did not stay in Mainz for long but moved around 1713 to Milan. He was known in Italy as 'Monsù Coixe'. He would remain active in Lombardia until his death, probably in Milan, in 1720.

== Work ==
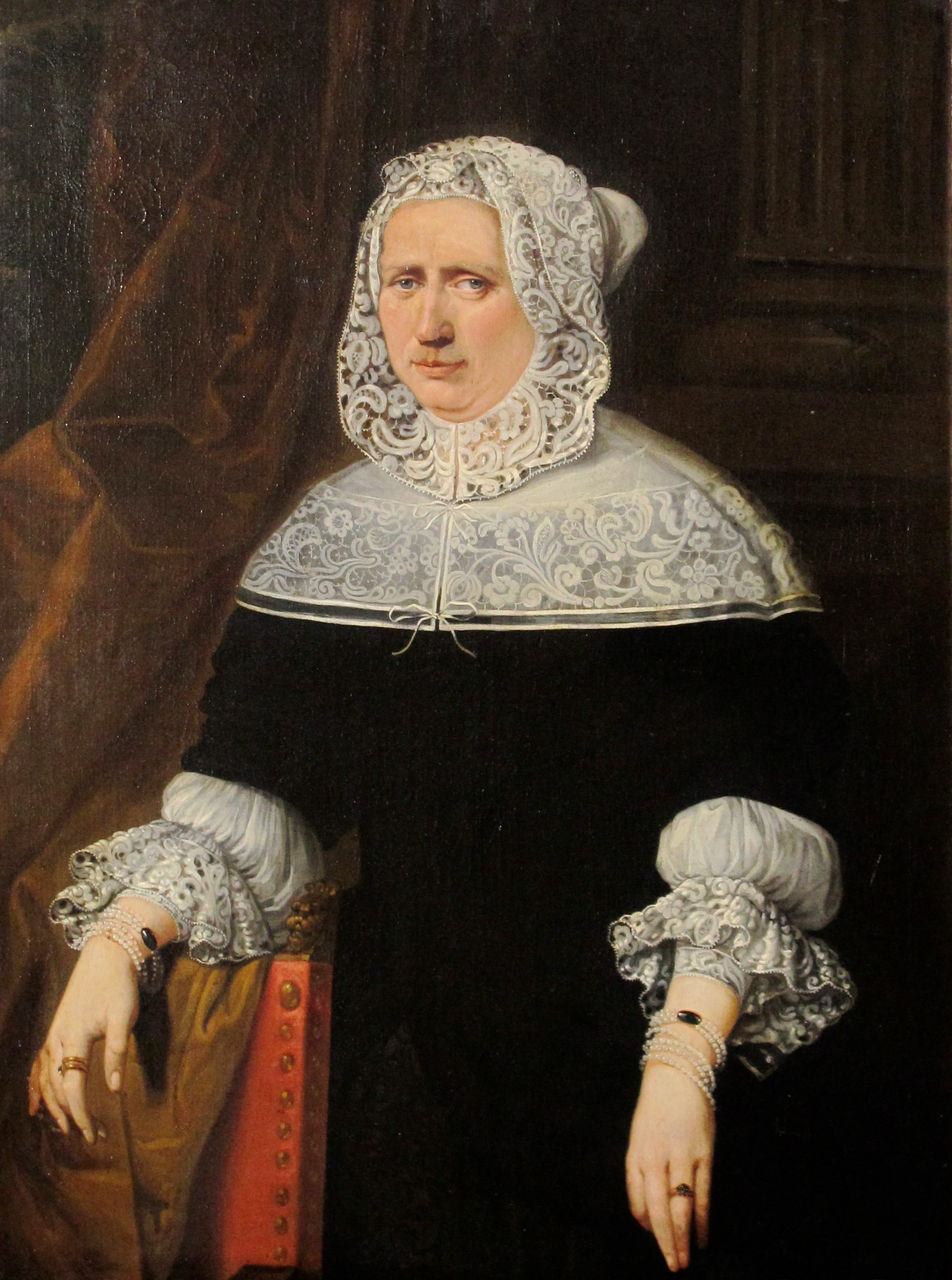
Portrait of Catharina de Dryver, wife of Pieter de Meester

He painted portraits as well as historical and allegorical paintings. His style is regarded as following that of Peter Paul Rubens and Anthony van Dyck. Whilst in Italy he produced copies after the work of these two leading Flemish Baroque artists. He was regarded as a capable draughtsman.

One of his masterpieces produced during his early career in Flanders is the large Group Portrait of the Fayd'Herbe Family in an Architectural Setting (in a private collection) of 1693. From his Amsterdam period, mainly portraits of prominent personalities such as the Portrait of Nicolaas van der Meer (Museum Catharijneconvent in Utrecht) and the Portrait of Antoni de Mestral (Breda's Museum) have been preserved.

Of the works from his Berlin period, the ceiling frescos he painted for the porcelain room in the Charlottenburg Palace are his best known. The frescos can be regarded as propaganda for the glorious rule of Frederick I. They represent Aurora, the Goddess of Dawn, in her seven-horsed chariot chasing away Night and clearing the way for the Sun-God Apollo, who approaches in his chariot in a blaze of light. Hovering overhead, Mercury heralds the arrival of the life-giving god and Saturn ushers in the Golden Age with his scythe. He also included images of the Four Continents as well as the Four Seasons, which are familiar allusions to political power and thus affirm the greatness of Frederick I.
