= Jan Coxie =

Flemish painter and draughtsman

Jan Coxie (baptized on 26 February 1629 – 1670) was a Flemish painter and draughtsman mainly known for his landscape paintings. He was a member of the Coxie family of artists which played an important role in the development of Flemish painting in the 16th and 17th centuries.

== Life ==
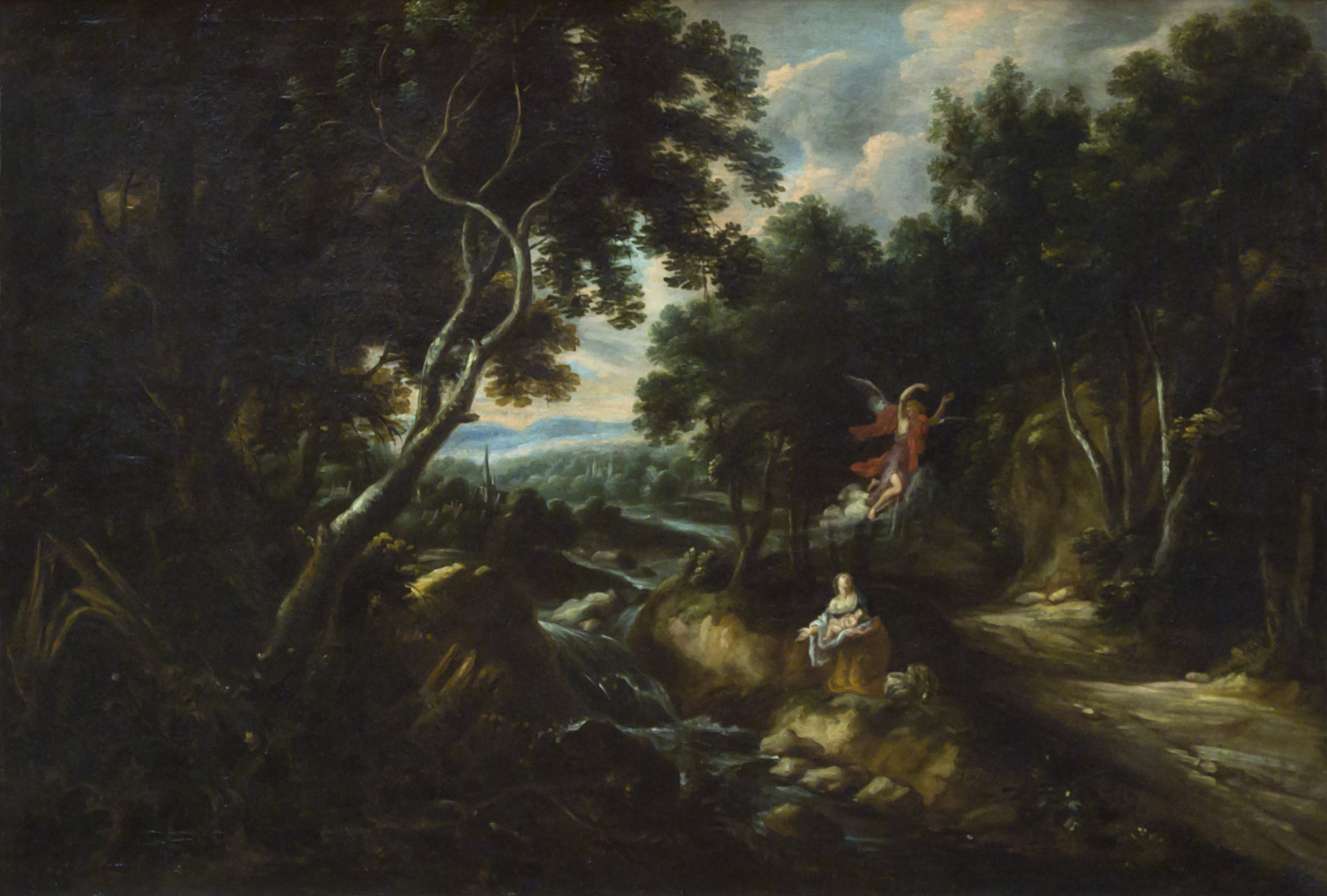
Hagar and the Angel in the Wilderness

Jan Coxie was born in Mechelen as the son of Michiel Coxie III. He was a great-grandson of Michiel Coxie, one of the leading Flemish Renaissance painters who was known as the 'Flemish Raphael'. Jan Coxie trained under his father and was accepted as a master of the local Guild of Saint Luke in 1651.

Jan Coxie married Joanna Biset in 1650 or in 1667 according to different sources. Joanna Biset was the sister of the painter Charles Emmanuel Biset. Charles Emmanuel Biset was originally also from Mechelen but had settled in Antwerp where he was director of the Academy of Antwerp.

Two of Jan's sons became painters in their own right: Jan Anthonie (1650/1670 – c. 1720) who had an international career as a portrait painter and Jan Michiel (1650/1670 – after 1689/1709) who remained in Mechelen where he worked mainly as a history painter. The three members of the Coxie family are sometimes confused with each other as they shared the first name 'Jan'.

Jan Coxie worked in Mechelen most of his life. Libert de Paepe, the abbot of the Park Abbey in Heverlee, was a great admirer of Coxie and commissioned at least 31 paintings by Coxie.

== Work ==
He was the only member of the Coxie family to specialise in landscapes. Only a few of his works are known. They are usually landscapes which include a religious scene although some of them are topographical landscapes. Examples of the former are two paintings of Hagar and the Angel in the Wilderness (one in the Palais des Beaux-Arts de Lille, the other in the Fogg Museum, Cambridge, Massachusetts) and some of the landscapes painted for the Park Abbey in Heverlee that depict scenes from the life of St Norbert such as the Meeting between St Norbert and Godefridus.

The paintings in the Park Abbey also include topographical paintings such as the Landscape with view of Heverlee.

Four works at the Park Abbey (documented 1651) have minor figures painted by Jan van Rintel while the other two signed ones have none.
