= Raphael Coxie =

Flemish Renaissance painter

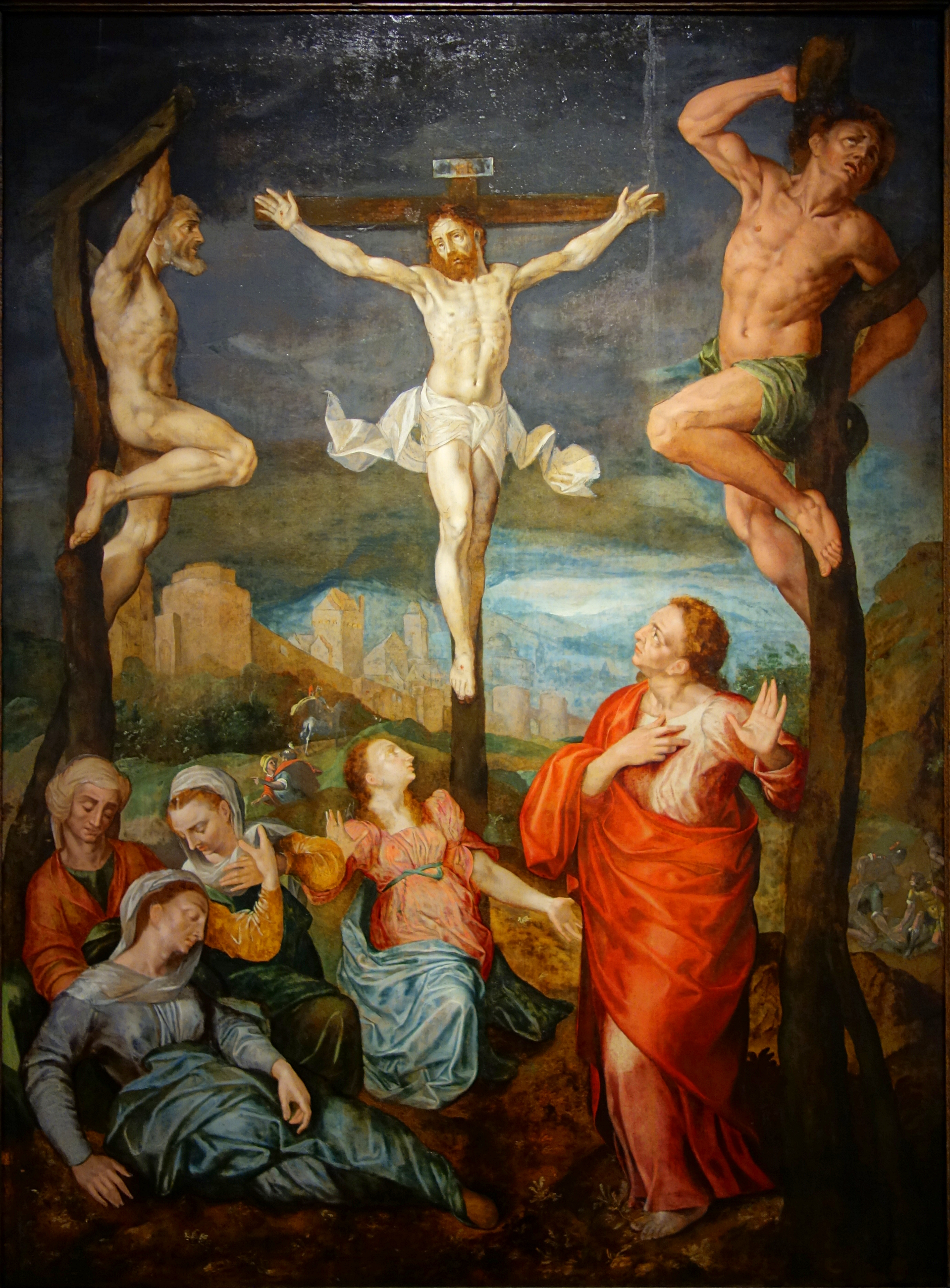
The Crucifixion, attributed to Raphael Coxie or Gillis Mostaert I

Raphael Coxcie (c. 1540 – 1616), was a Flemish Renaissance painter mainly known for his portrait and history paintings.

== Life ==
Details about the life and career of the artist are sketchy. He was only rediscovered as a distinctive artist in the 19th century as it was earlier believed that Raphael Coxie was another name for Michiel Coxie, one of the leading Flemish Renaissance painters who was known in his time as the 'Flemish Raphael'. It is assumed that Raphael Coxie was born in Mechelen as the eldest son of Michiel Coxie by his first wife Ida van Hasselt. The time of birth was likely between 1539, the year of his father's return from Italy, and 1543, the year his father was registered in the Brussels Guild of Saint Luke and declared to have a son named Raphael. Raphael Coxie is said to have been given his first name because of the admiration of his father for the Italian painter known by that name. He was the older brother of Anna and Willem and half brother of Michiel the Younger. Anna was a sculptor and later became a nun while Willem and Michiel the Younger were painters.

He was a pupil of his father and became master in the Mechelen Guild of Saint Luke in 1562. He is documented as residing in Mechelen up to the early 1580s. His first wife Jeanne van Bekercke was buried in Mechelen in 1577 and he then married Elisabeth Cauthals who also died. He moved to Antwerp some time between 1581 and 1585 where he became master in the local Guild of St. Luke in 1585. He had by that time married a third time. His last wife was Anna Jonghelinck and a son of theirs was baptized in Antwerp on 20 January 1585.

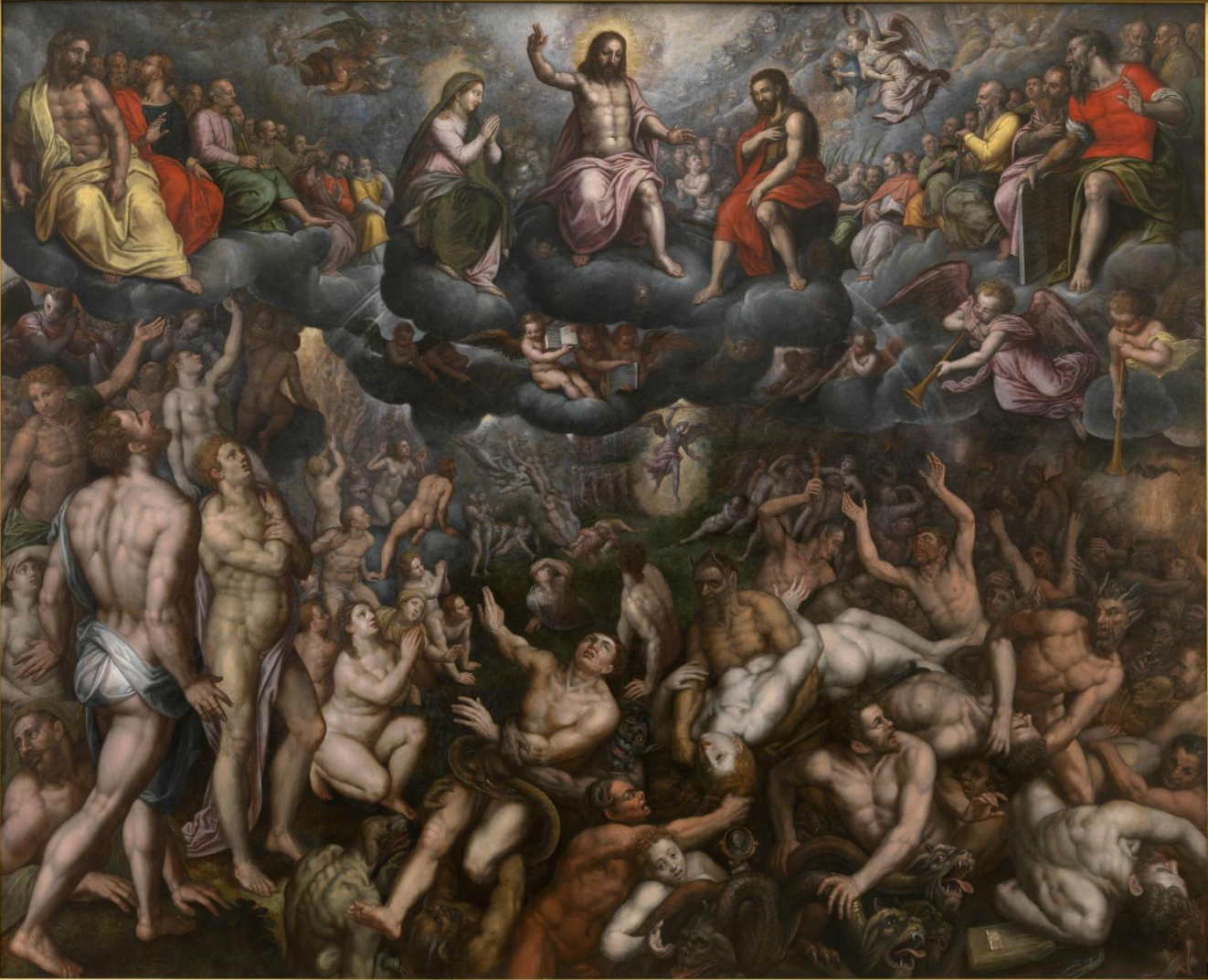
The Last Judgement

Raphael was a passionate gardener and friend of the Flemish botanist Carolus Clusius to whom he sent drawings of flowers, which Clusius used in his scientific publications. After the Fall of Antwerp in 1585 he was commissioned to make the painting of the retable of the Virgin Mary for the altar of the Confrerie of Our Lady in the Antwerp Cathedral. He executed the painting in collaboration with Hans Vredeman de Vries, who was responsible for the architectonic elements of the composition.

He was active from 1586 in Brussels where he became a master of the local painter's guild in 1605. In the period 1588-89 he spent time in Ghent on a major commission for a painting of the Last Judgement to be placed in the chamber of the city aldermen. The painting had been ordered by the local city magistrate to replace a panel by Cornelis van der Goes that had gone missing after the iconoclastic fury of the Beeldenstorm. The fee for the work had not been agreed beforehand and when the Ghent aldermen offered to pay an amount of 1,000 guilders Coxie relied on a clause in the contract to have the value of the painting assessed by masters or other persons knowledgeable on these matters. The artists Maerten de Vos, Ambrosius Francken I, Gillis Mostaert and Bernaert de Rijckere were asked to value the painting and they put its value at an amount of about 1,400 guilders. The aldermen paid the amount of 1,400 guilders but then a conflict arose over the return of the advance fee received by Coxie. This led to judicial proceedings which were decided by the Council of Flanders in favour of Coxie seven years later.

While in Ghent Coxie also painted a Resurrection of Christ for the monks of the Abbey of Drongen, which he donated to them in gratitude for their hospitality. Coxie received an annual allocation of 50 florins from the city of Brussels in exchange for putting his talents at the disposal of the Brussels' tapestry manufacturers. He is recorded in 1597 as making, in collaboration with Gilbert van Veen, several portraits commissioned by Philip II of Spain. There is uncertainty as to whether or when Coxie was appointed court painter to Philip II of Spain. Some authors place the date of such appointment during Coxie's stay in Mechelen while others date it to the period after he moved to Brussels in 1586.

Coxie married three times and had four children, none of whom followed in his profession. He died in Brussels in 1616.

His pupils included Jacob van der Gracht, Andries van Baesrode (I) and Jacob van der Heyden. According to the early Flemish biographer Cornelis de Bie, Gaspar de Crayer was also his apprentice. He possibly also trained his half-brother Michiel II and his nephew Michiel III.

== Work ==
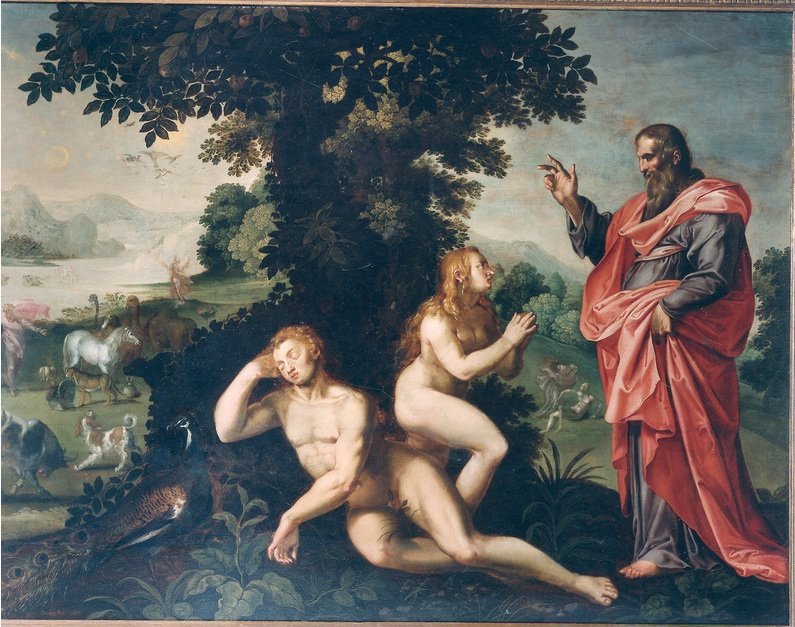
The creation of Eve

His works are painted in the Italianate style that his father introduced in Flanders after his return from a study period in Italy. As his style was close to that of his father, a number of his works have in the past been attributed to his father. He remained faithful to this style even while the new Baroque movement was emerging. Only a few paintings are currently attributed to him. Although it is known he completed commissions for portraits, no surviving portraits are currently attributed to Coxie.

The only work that can be attributed to him with certainty is the Last Judgement that he painted in the period 1588-89 for the Ghent city magistrate. Currently, it hangs in the Museum of Fine Arts in Ghent. The composition of the painting is quite traditional. Christ is seated on a cloud and surrounded by saints and angels. On the left, the blessed are kneeling down, while on the right, the damned are dragged to hell by satyrs and monsters. The painting incorporates a crouching figure inspired by the statue of the Crouching Venus by the famous Greek sculptor Doidalses. The life-size nudes at the bottom left of the panel are reminiscent of Michelangelo, while the upper part representing heaven calls to mind Raphael's work.

The Bonnefanten Museum in Maastricht holds a Crucifixion that has tentatively been attributed to Raphael Coxie or Gillis Mostaert. A painting depicting the Rest on the Flight to Egypt has also been attributed to him. A painting of the Creation of Eve was sold at Bernaerts, Antwerp on 30 March 1998. The composition was likely based on an engraving made by Cornelis Cort after Taddeo Zucceri's treatment of the same subject.
