= Michiel Coxie =

Flemish painter and designer (1499–1592)

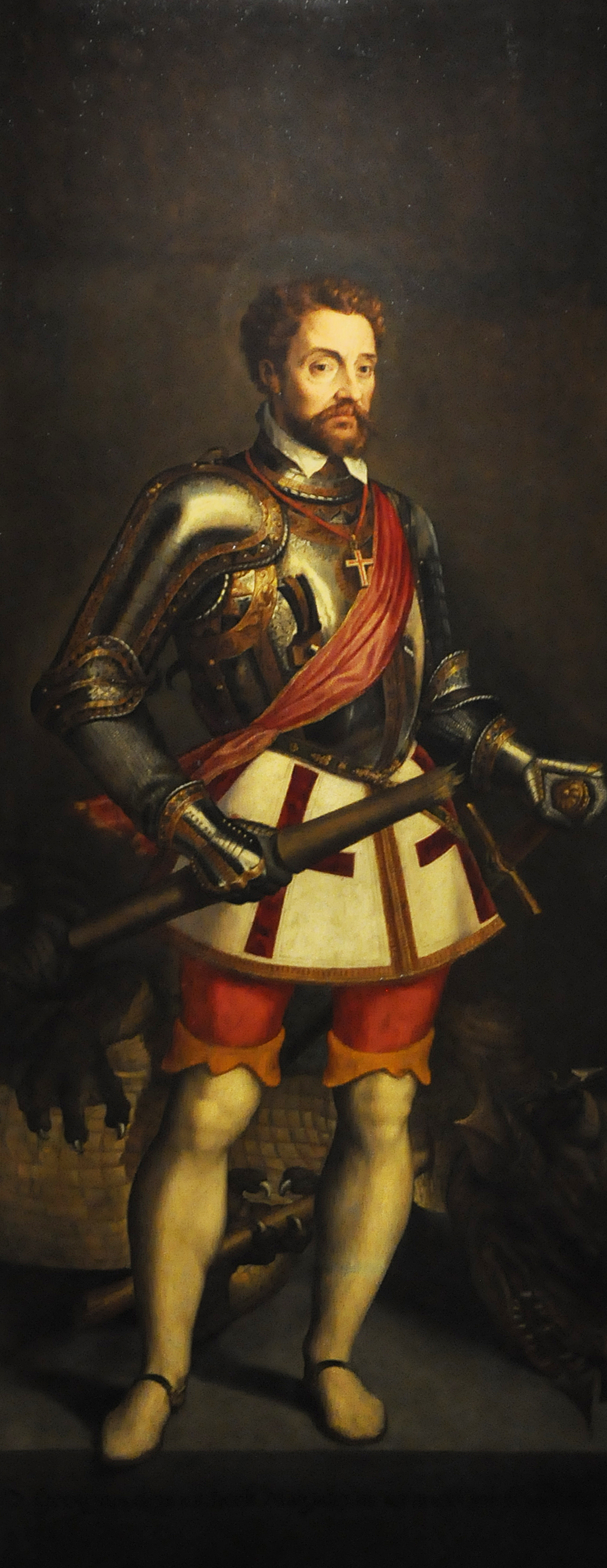
Self-portrait as Saint George

Michiel Coxie the Elder, Michiel Coxcie the Elder or Michiel van Coxcie, Latinised name Coxius (1499 – 3 March 1592), was a Flemish painter of altarpieces and portraits, a draughtsman and a designer of stained-glass windows, tapestries and prints. He worked for patrons in the principal cities of Flanders. He became the court painter to successively Emperor Charles V and King Philip II of Spain.

Highly respected by his contemporaries, Coxie was given the nickname the Flemish Raphael as some of his contemporaries regarded him as being on an equal level as the Italian master. This also reflected his contemporaries' appreciation that his study of classical Antiquity and the art of Renaissance masters like Raphael, Michelangelo and Leonardo da Vinci during his 10-year residence in Italy had left an important mark on his style. His innovative style and bold compositions were in the centuries after his death an inspiration to Flemish artists including Peter Paul Rubens. He was thus an important artistic link between the artists of early Netherlandish painting and the Flemish Baroque. Coxie was also a copyist and produced a well-known copy of the Ghent Altarpiece by the van Eyck brothers as well as a Descent from the Cross by Rogier van der Weyden.

== Life ==
=== Early life and training ===
No records survive about the early life and training of Michiel Coxie. His year of birth has been determined to be 1499 through deduction from later sources. The place of his birth also remains uncertain. It is generally assumed that he was born in Mechelen as this was the first place he appears to have returned to after his long-term residence in Italy. Some art historians have suggested that his place of birth was in the region around Hasselt, then in the Prince-Bishopric of Liège.

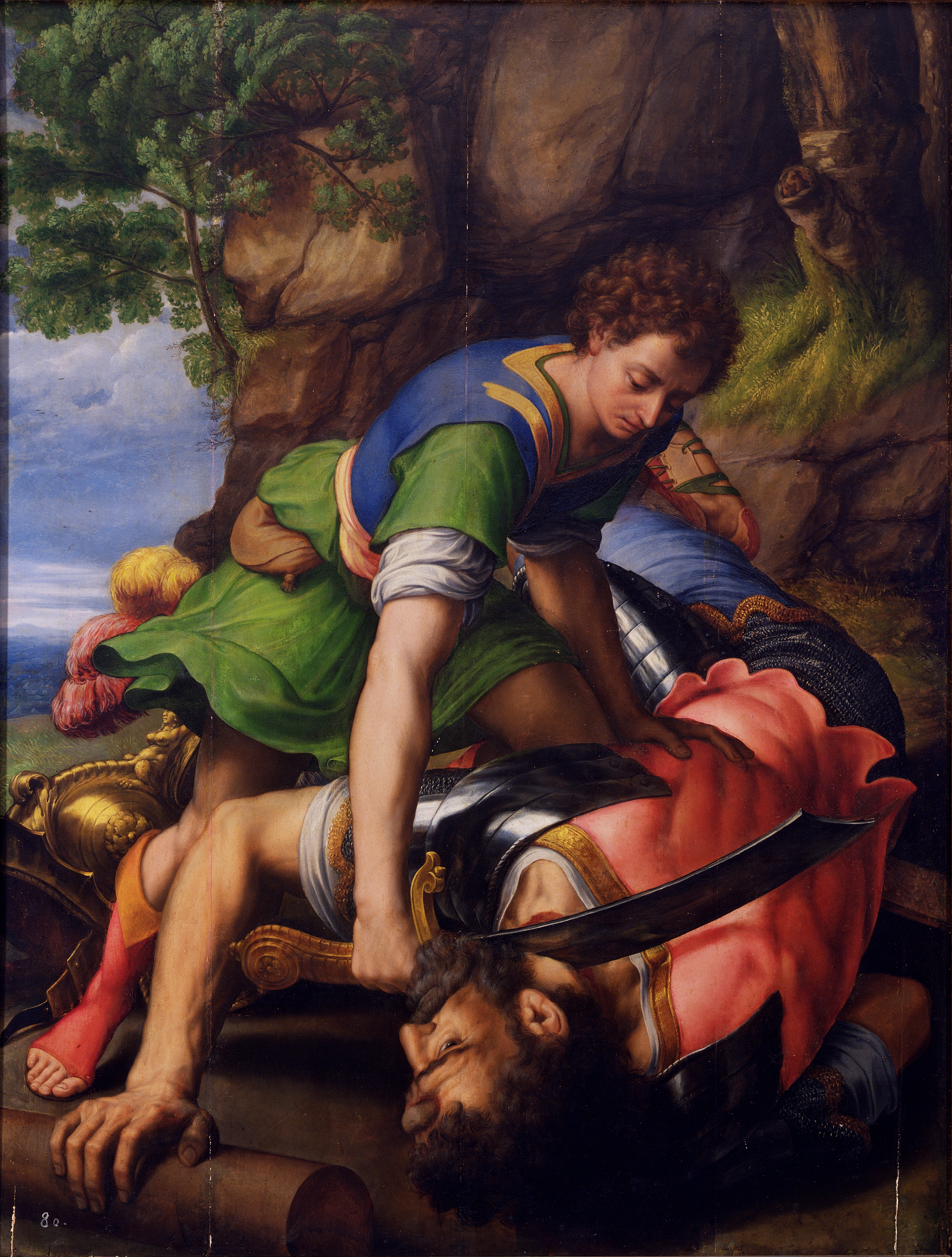
David and Goliath

The master or masters from whom he received his artistic training are not documented. Most known facts and statements of later biographers point to a training in the workshop of the Brussels master Bernard van Orley. It is known that during his stay in Rome, Coxie enjoyed the favor of the Flemish Cardinal Willem van Enckevoirt who may have been Bernard van Orley's patron in Rome assuming van Orley really took the trip to Rome as some sources have suggested. It has been speculated that this relationship with the Cardinal proves that van Orley recommended his pupil to his former patron. Michiel Coxie was also asked to complete the commission for the stained glass windows of the Church of St. Michael and St. Gudula (now Brussels' cathedral) after Bernard van Orley died in 1541. The early Flemish artist biographer Karel van Mander states in his Schilderboeck of 1604 that Coxie trained with a "Bernard van Brussel" (Bernard from Brussels). It is therefore reasonable to conclude that Coxie was a pupil of Bernard van Orley. Even so, due to the lack of contemporary documentary evidence and surviving youth works by Coxie it is not possible to confirm with certainty that Bernard van Orly was Coxie's master.

=== Foreign travel ===
The earliest documents attesting to Michiel Coxie's life and activities date to the period of his residence in Rome. The Florentine artist and artist's biographer Giorgio Vasari knew Coxie personally. He recounts that Coxie was commissioned by Cardinal Willem van Enckevoirt to paint frescoes in the Santa Maria dell'Anima. Work on the frescoes likely commenced around 1531. As the fresco technique is a painting technique typical of the Italian Renaissance and virtually unknown in contemporary Flemish painting, it must be assumed that by the time Coxie started work on the frescos he had already resided in Italy for a period of time so as to familiarise himself with this technique. It is therefore believed he may have arrived in Italy around 1527 after the sack of Rome by the Holy Roman Emperor Charles V. It appears that the frescoes in the Santa Maria dell'Anima earned him a reputation in Rome. Not long after completing the frescoes in 1534 he was admitted to the Compagnia di San Luca, Rome's guild of painters and miniaturists. He was one of the first Flemish artists to be inducted into the guild.

Coxie stayed in Italy until the end of the 1530s executing many commissions. He was involved in the decoration of the new St. Peter's Basilica but the frescoes that he created are lost due to later renovations to the interior of the church. During his stay in Italy he also provided designs for Italian engravers including for the series of 32 prints on the history of Amor and Psyche which was engraved by Agostino Veneziano and the Master of the Die and published by Antonio Salamanca in Rome between 1530 and 1560.

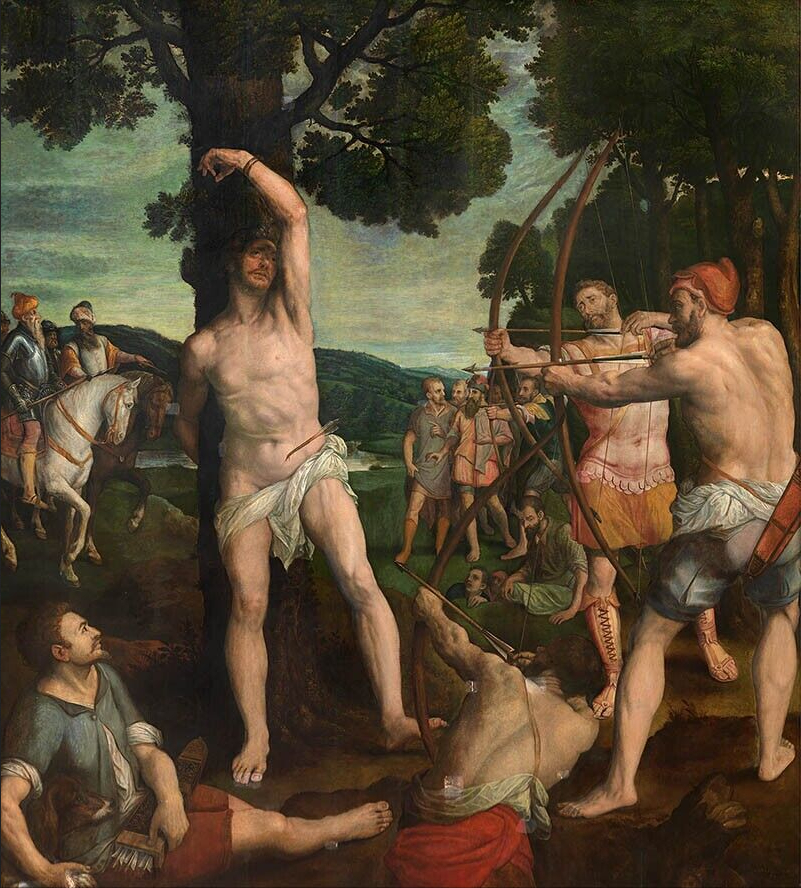
The martyrdom of St. Sebastian

=== Return to Flanders ===
Coxie travelled in 1539 back to his home country via Milan. While in Milan he made two designs for tapestries. He first settled in Mechelen where he registered in the local Guild of Saint Luke on 11 November 1539. He lived in Mechelen in a house on the Bruul, in the city centre. He married Ida van Hasselt, a native of the city of Hasselt, then in the County of Loon in the Prince-Bishopric of Liège. He later resided in Liège, the principal city in the Prince-Bishopric of Liège. Liège was at that time an important artistic centre where important artists such as Lambert Lombard, Frans Floris and Willem Key were active. Lombard and Floris were Romanists, i.e. artists from the Low Countries who had travelled to Rome where they had assimilated the new Renaissance currents which they translated upon their return home into a break with the Netherlandish painting traditions. It is not entirely clear how long he stayed in Liège. It may be that for a while he travelled between Mechelen and Liège. The first children of Coxie, a son Raphael and a daughter Anna, may have been born in Liège although other sources place their births in Mechelen. Raphael followed in his father's footsteps and became a successful painter. Another son called Willem was born in Mechelen in 1545 or 1546. Willem also became a painter but no existing works by him are known.

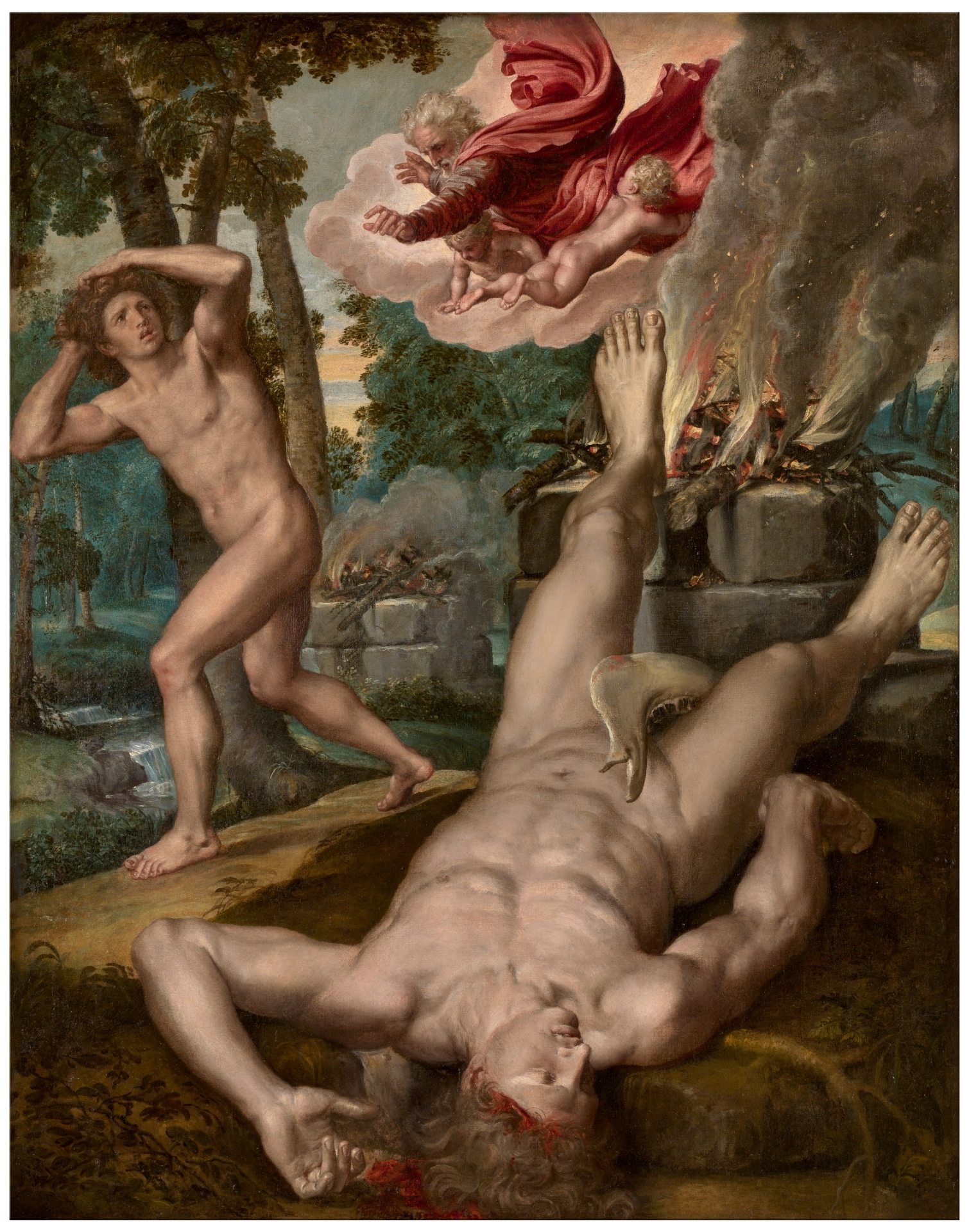
Killing of Abel

Upon his return to the Low Countries Coxie became a sought-after artist who gained many commissions. The first important one was the 1540 commission for The Holy Kinship (now in Stift Kremsmünster, Kremsmünster, Austria). This work, probably commissioned by the Antwerp Hosemakers Guild for their altar in the Antwerp Cathedral, is a monumental triptych showing at the centre the Virgin Mary with her mother Anna, Christ and John the Baptist. The scene is set in an overwhelming Renaissance architecture with many figures. With this work Coxie offered the general public in Flanders its first confrontation with the monumental, grand style of the High Renaissance.

When Bernard van Orley died in 1541, while he was working on the designs for stained glass windows for the chapel of the Habsburg rulers in the Church of St. Michael and St. Gudula in Brussels, Coxie took over the commission and delivered four designs. Afterwards he was commissioned to design a cycle of stained glass for the St Bavo's Cathedral in Ghent. It is believed that around this time he succeeded van Orley as the court painter to Mary of Hungary, sister of Charles V, Holy Roman Emperor and the governor of the Netherlands. Coxie also contributed to the new Habsburg castle in Binche, construction of which started in 1546. The architect was Jacques Du Brœucq from Mons who had also lived and studied in Italy. Coxcie realized fresco paintings in the new castle. He also received the commission to paint a retabel for the rood screen of the Church of St. Michael and St. Gudula in Brussels. In 1543 Coxie was registered as a poorter (citizen) of the city of Brussels and as a member of the local Guild of Saint Luke. Brussels was at the time the administrative capital of the Low Countries where the court of Mary of Hungary was established. He operated a large workshop in Brussels. His financial success was such that by 1550 he owned two houses in Brussels. He became gradually sought after as a designer of cartoons for tapestries, first by the Habsburg rulers but later also by the local industry. This is not surprising because at that time Brussels was the world center for the production of tapestries, then an important economic factor in the entire Netherlands. He was given the title of cartoon painter of the city of Brussels for which he received an annual salary. Several of Coxcie's tapestry designs have been documented, but none have survived. Some cartoons and series of tapestries have been attributed to him, based on stylistic rather than archival grounds. He participated in the 'Jagiellonian tapestries' which were sold to Sigismund II Augustus for his castle on the Wawel. He created the designs for some biblical scenes including scenes from the Story of the First Parents, the Story of Noah and the Story of the Tower of Babel. Coxie may also have designed the tapestries for Phillip II's Royal Palace of Madrid depicting episodes of the life of Cyrus II, based on the writing of Herodotus.

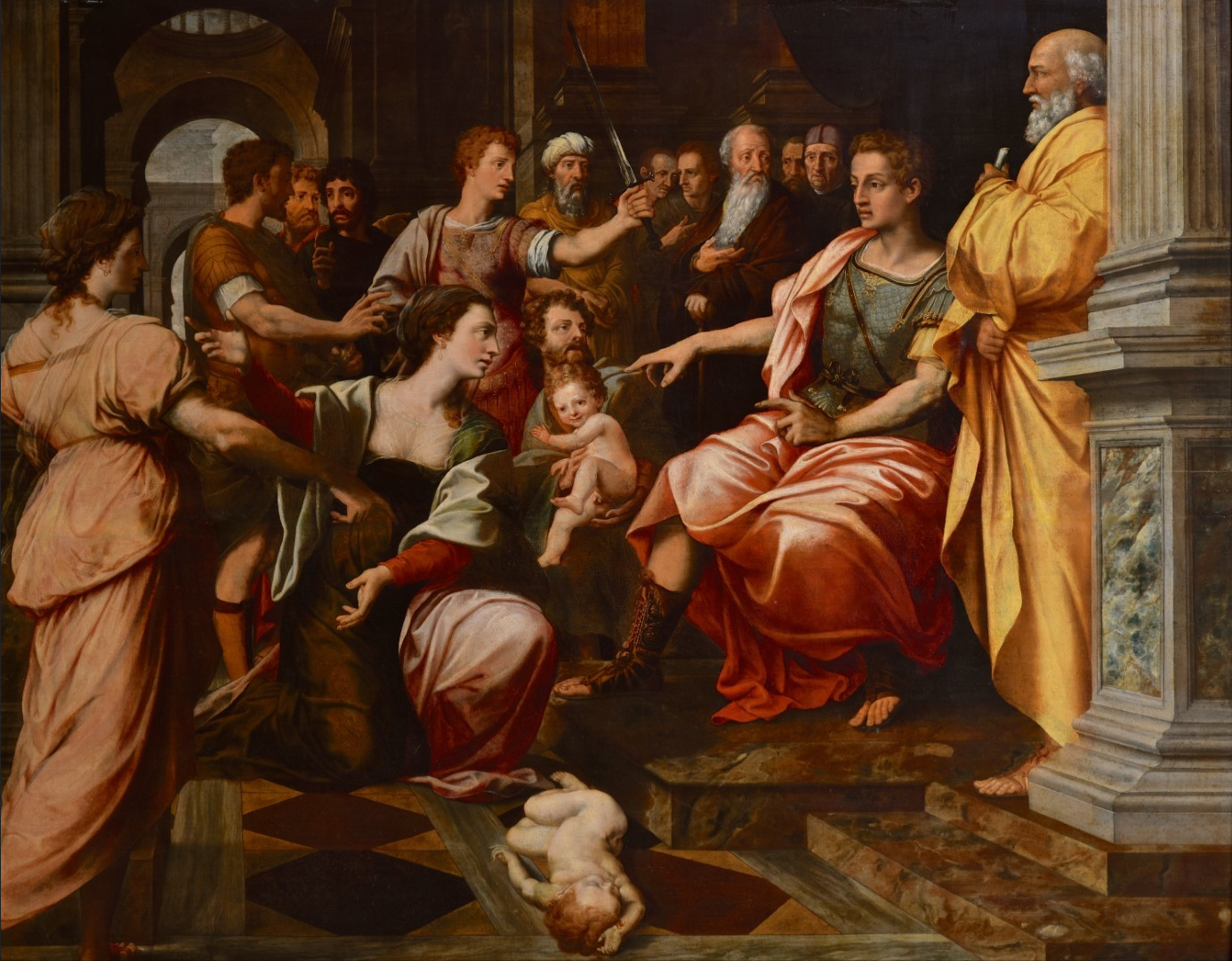
The judgement of Solomon

Charles V, Holy Roman Emperor, then the ruler over the Low Countries, commissioned many works from Coxie. Coxie also gained commissions from many other prominent persons such as the Morillon family for whom he painted the Triptych with the triumph of Christ (M – Museum Leuven). Guy Morillon, originally from Burgundy, was one of the most prominent notables of Leuven and a secretary to king Charles V. Coxie further designed the decorations for the joyous entry of then crown prince Philip II in Brussels in 1549 and a series of portraits of the Habsburg rulers. When in 1555 king Charles V stepped down from the throne in favor of his son Philip II, the new ruler maintained the royal support for Coxie. Philip tasked Coxie with making a true-to-life copy of the Ghent Altarpiece by the van Eyck brothers. As the altarpiece was located in the St Bavo's Cathedral in Ghent, Coxie temporarily moved to Ghent to execute this commission. He resided there from 1557 to 1559. After completing his copy in 1559, he moved to Mechelen where he acquired a house on the Bruul by swopping it for one of his Brussels homes. He continued to live in this city and became a member of the local chamber of rhetoric de Peoene and the guild of musketeers. At the time Mechelen had gained importance as a religious centre in Flanders because of the founding in 1559 of the Archbischopric of Mechelen, which from 1561 was led by the powerful cardinal Antoine Perrenot de Granvelle who was also the king's chancellor. Philip II of Spain commissioned two copies of Van der Weyden's Descent from the Cross from Coxie.

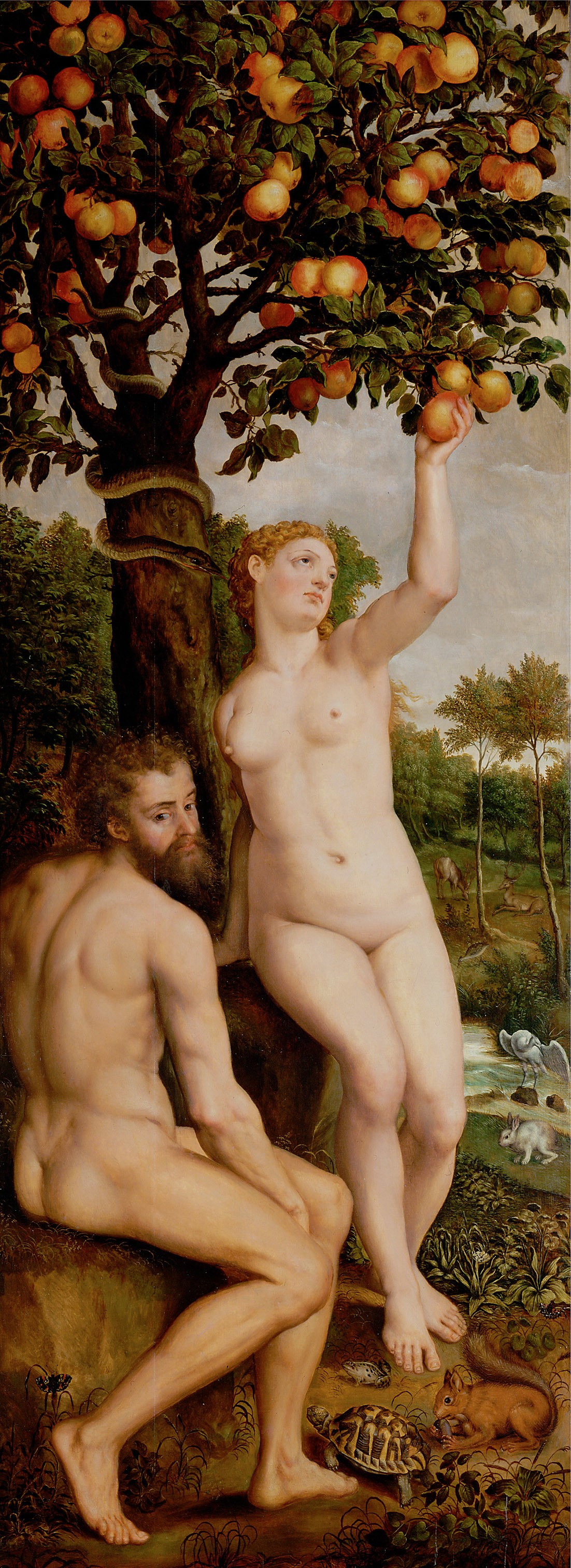
Original Sin

Also for King Philip, Coxcie painted St. Cecilia at the Virginal (1569). Now in the Prado, this is one of several related paintings of Cecilia by Coxcie and/or his workshop, showing the saint performing identifiable music by Coxcie's Flemish contemporaries Jacobus Clemens non Papa and Thomas Crecquillon.

When in 1566 the Beeldenstorm caused the destruction of many religious objects he is said to have attempted to defend Mechelen against the iconoclasts. This shows that he was at heart a devout Catholic and a loyalist of the Habsburg court. This attitude earned him the strong support of the king as well as the protection of the Duke of Alba, governor of the Habsburg Netherlands between 1567 and 1573. The Beeldenstorm caused the loss of a large portion of Coxcie's existing works. This era of religious turmoil saw the painter facing many other setbacks. His son Willem who had travelled to Rome in 1567 to study art was arrested in Italy on suspicion of heresy as he had travelled with a group of Dutch and German Protestants. He was convicted to the galleys for 10 years. After the king's chancellor de Granvelle, who was then living in Rome, interceded personally with the Pope the sentence was cut in half. A few years later king Philip II himself intervened leading to the liberation of Willem. This illustrates the extent of the support by powerful figures which the artist enjoyed at that time. Even the Duke of Alva bestowed favors on him and his family when he granted Michiel and his son Raphael dispensation from the compulsory billeting of Spanish soldiers at their homes.

His wife died in 1569. Two months after her death he married Jeanne van Schelle (or van Schellen or van Schallen), with whom he had two more children of whom Michiel the Younger became a painter. The painter's whereabouts from the 1570s are not entirely clear. In October 1572 Spanish troops plundered Mechelen for three days after retaking the city from an army under the command of William the Silent, the leader of the Dutch Revolt. The event known as the Spanish Fury caused many local painters to flee to Antwerp. Coxie was outside of the country, possibly in Spain, when the events happened. His house was plundered and some painters from Antwerp were able to buy back some tapestry designs which Spanish soldiers had looted from his home.

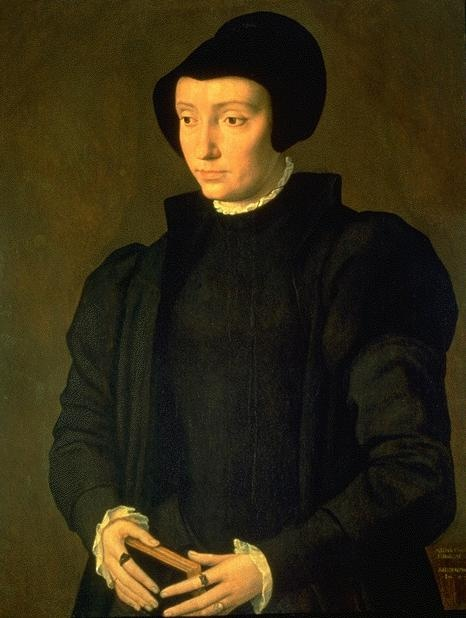
Portrait of Christina of Denmark

Upon his return to Flanders, Coxie stayed in Mechelen and took on two pupils in his workshop. However, Mechelen had become a cultural wasteland while Antwerp offered attractive opportunities as many of the altarpieces which had been destroyed needed to be replaced and its leading history painters Frans Floris and Willem Key had just died. He completed an altarpiece in Antwerp in 1575 and was registered in the Guild of Saint Luke of Antwerp in 1578. He remained in Antwerp during the period from 1580 to 1585 when the city was governed by a Calvinist government. He was even able as a Catholic to obtain commissions from the local government, which was tolerant of Catholics. In 1585 he was registered as a tenant in the Kloosterstraat in Antwerp, while his house in Mechelen was rented out. After the Fall of Antwerp and the return of Spanish Catholic control over the city in 1585, Coxie immediately gained commissions from patrons in Mechelen, including the city government. The continued appreciation of the Spanish king for the elderly artist was demonstrated when in 1589, he granted him an annuity. Coxie continued painting even when he was over 90 years old.. His last work, dated 1592, was the Triptych of the Legend of Santa Gudula, today in the Cathedral of St. Michael and St. Gudula in Brussels. This contains on the back of one of the side panels the only known portrait of Philip II painted by the artist. Shortly thereafter, he died after accidentally falling off a scaffold while working on the restoration of the Judgment of Solomon in the Antwerp City Hall that he had made nine years earlier for the Antwerp City Council.

== Work ==
=== General ===
Coxie was a prolific artist, who painted altarpieces and portraits and produced designs for stained-glass windows, tapestries and prints. He was skilled in the traditional Flemish oil on panel technique as well as the Italian fresco technique. His career spanned almost the entire 16th century. He operated a large workshop which ensured a large output which contributed to his lifetime reputation and influence. After his death his work soon fell into oblivion as it was overtaken quickly by the triumphant Baroque style introduced into Flanders by Rubens, another Flemish artist who had studied and worked for an extended time in Italy.

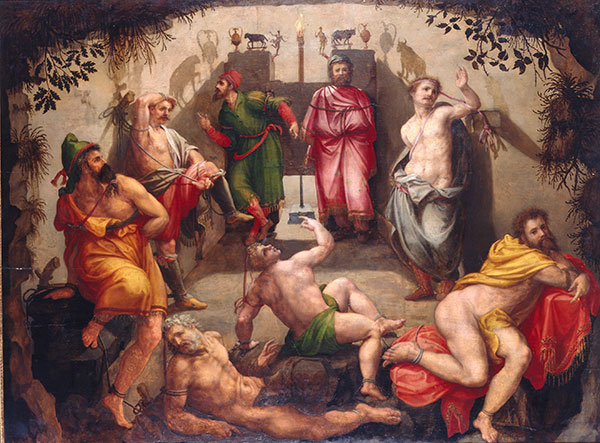
Plato's Cave

His style is a unique synthesis of the Flemish and Italian artistic traditions. His presumed master Bernard van Orley had possibly never studied in Italy but had certainly familiarised himself with the new pictorial vocabulary of the Italian Renaissance through his study of the designs of Raphael. These designs had been brought to Brussels. He had responded to Raphael's work by making the figures in his altarpieces more monumental and heroic. He also included classical architecture in his compositions. During his stay in Rome, Coxie was able to directly study the works of Raphael, Michelangelo and other Renaissance painters as well as study the works of Antiquity that were being rediscovered at the time. He also read classical literature and philosophy and was aware of the intellectual discussions on the reception of Antique art in Italy. The panel Plato's Cave which he likely painted during his stay in Rome is an attempt by Coxie to express these visual and philosophical influences. The painting references Plato's ideas (the allegory of the cave) expressed in his The Sofist about how art imitates nature and sometimes deviates from perfect imitation by changing the proportions in order for the viewer to get a true appreciation of the real object. Coxie deals in Plato's Cave with the question about how art can properly depict reality and what art can tell us about that reality. Only the viewer of the painting can see the way out of the cave, and according to Plato, this search should be the object of all true philosophy. In Plato's Cave Coxie borrows heavily from Michelangelo's models as well as from Antique models. For instance, the Roman Antique statue of Falling Galatian (Venice National Archaeological Museum) was the model for the tormented man in the centre.

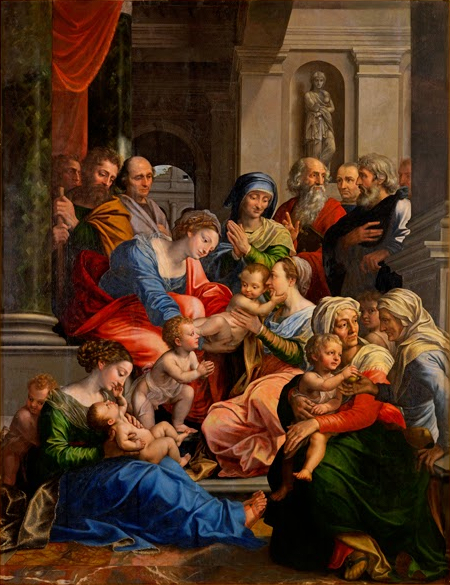
The Holy Kinship

The first important work he realised upon his return to Flanders after his stay in Italy shows all the key characteristics of his style and the contribution he made to Flemish painting. The triptych of The Holy Kinship (now in Stift Kremsmünster, Kremsmünster, Austria) was painted in 1540 for the Antwerp Hosemakers Guild's altar in the Antwerp Cathedral. It is a monumental triptych showing at the centre the Virgin Mary with her mother Anna, Christ and John the Baptist. The scene is set in an overwhelming Renaissance architecture with many figures. With this work Coxie showed that he had mastered the Italian style, while not abandoning his roots. The painting has many Italian characteristics. The figure of the Virgin, for instance, goes back directly to Da Vinci. The architectural columns, drapes and niches were inspired by Raphael. Flemish elements in the work are the attention to detail and the rich colour which evoke the work of Jan van Eyck and Rogier van der Weyden.

=== Prints ===
Like many artists of his time, Coxie provided designs for the printers and engravers. An important graphic series by Coxi recounts the story of Amor and Psyche. The series was attributed for a long time to Raphael, which testifies to Coxcie's excellence as a draughtsman. The Italian artist biographer Giorgio Vasari who knew Coxie personally recounts that Coxie made the design sketches. Another series of prints designed by Coxie tells the stories of The loves of Jupiter. He based his designs for both series on stories and art works from Antiquity as well as on works by Raphael and Michelangelo.
