= Poorter =

Right to live within city walls

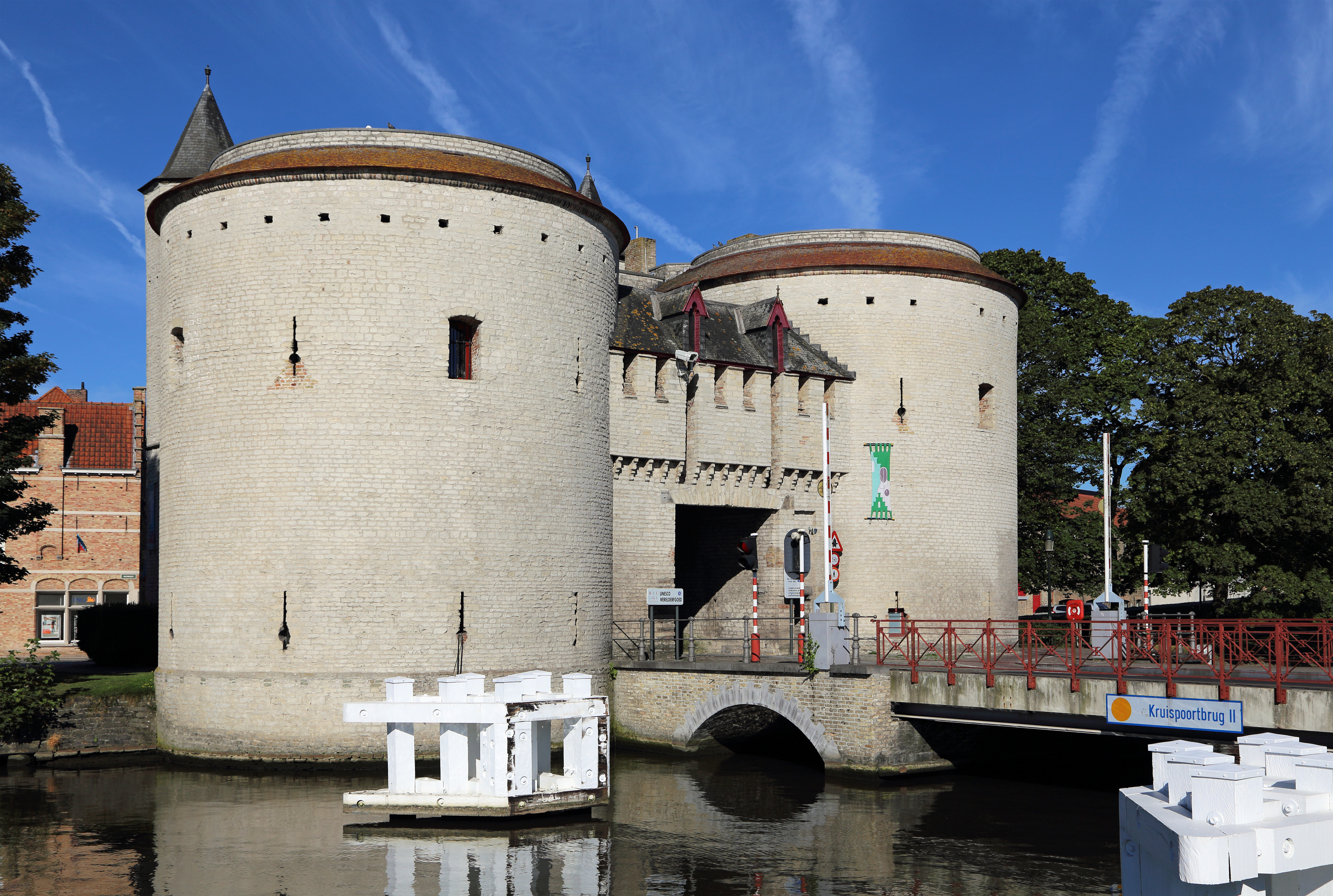
Kruispoort, one of the four remaining gates of Bruges, Belgium

Poorter (Dutch pronunciation: [ˈpoːrtər]) is an historical term for a type of Dutch, or Flemish, burgher who had acquired the right to live within the walls of a city with city rights.

In the Dutch Republic, this poorterrecht or poorterschap (citizenship) could be gained by paying 40, later 50 guilders, and registering with the magistrate of the city. The payment of money was to prove that one was not poor, and that one could maintain a household. There were also religious restrictions, and numerous cities forbade Jews from attaining citizenship. An oath was also taken. Some cities also had grootburgers (grand burghers), who received more rights than normal citizens, but had to pay a higher price to acquire it. The privileges were abolished after the French invasion of the Austrian Netherlands and the Dutch Republic in 1794-1795. There was a distinction between the ordinary inhabitants of the city (residents) and the poorters, who enjoyed a higher status because of their origin, education, income, craftsmanship and so on.

The city would be surrounded by a city wall, and a moat, which offered safety, and protection, of a certain level, to its citizens. At nightfall, the city gates would be closed by the gate watch. The Keys to the city were handed to the Burgemeester, and returned again the next day.

The entire citizenry of a city was sometimes called the Poorterij.
