= Baroque sculpture =

Sculpture of the Baroque movement

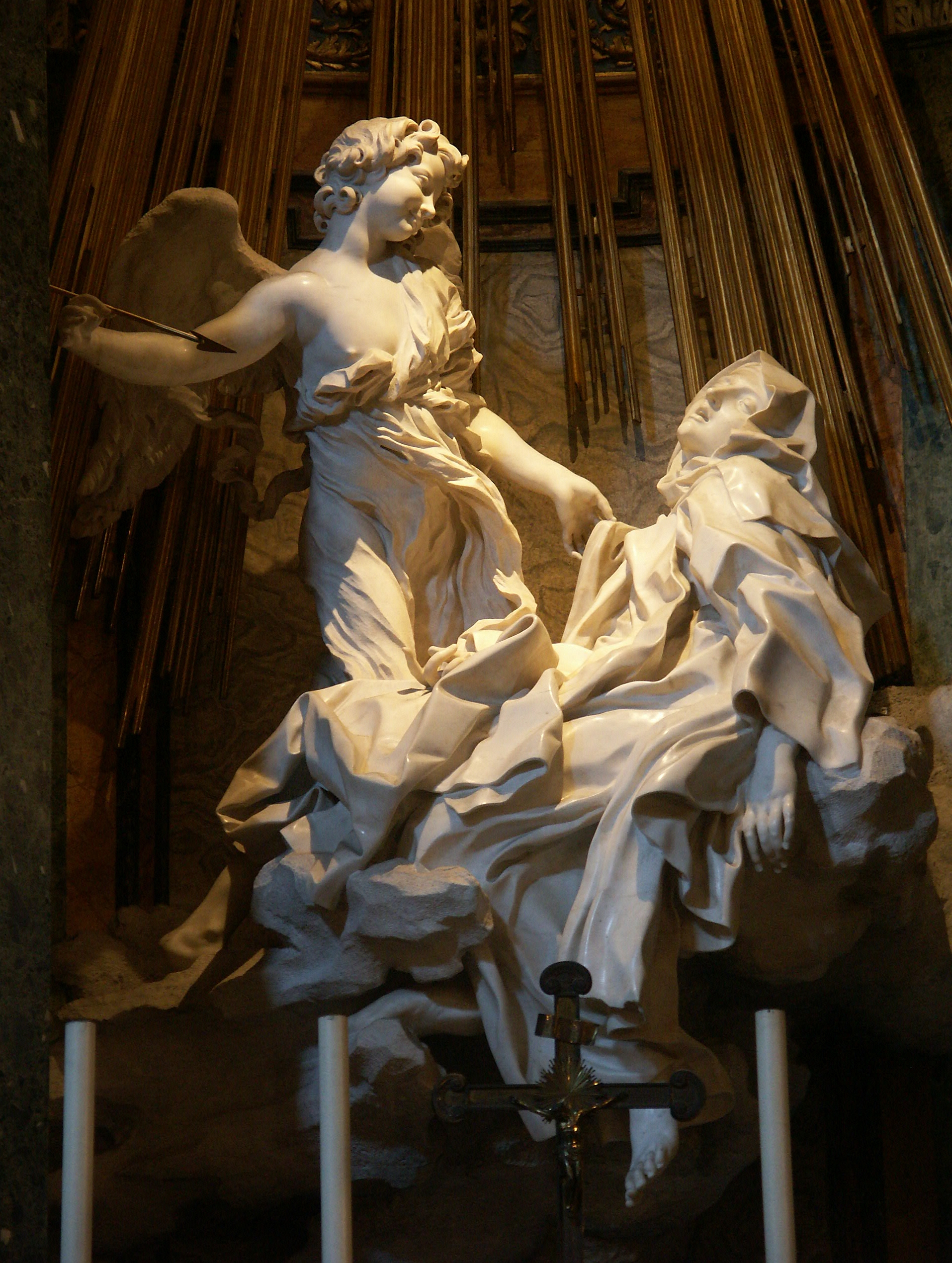
The Ecstasy of St Theresa (1647–1652) Gian Lorenzo Bernini

Baroque sculpture is the sculpture associated with the Baroque style of the period between the early 17th and mid 18th centuries. In Baroque sculpture, groups of figures assumed new importance, and there was a dynamic movement and energy of human forms—they spiralled around an empty central vortex, or reached outwards into the surrounding space. Baroque sculpture often had multiple ideal viewing angles, and reflected a general continuation of the Renaissance move away from the relief to sculpture created in the round, and designed to be placed in the middle of a large space—elaborate fountains such as Gian Lorenzo Bernini‘s Fontana dei Quattro Fiumi (Rome, 1651), or those in the Gardens of Versailles were a Baroque speciality. The Baroque style was perfectly suited to sculpture, with Bernini the dominating figure of the age in works such as Ecstasy of Saint Theresa (1647–1652). Much Baroque sculpture added extra-sculptural elements, for example, concealed lighting, or water fountains, or fused sculpture and architecture to create a transformative experience for the viewer. Artists saw themselves as in the classical tradition, but admired Hellenistic and later Roman sculpture, rather than that of the more "Classical" periods as they are seen today.

Baroque sculpture followed Renaissance and Mannerist sculpture and was succeeded by Rococo and Neoclassical Sculpture. Rome was the earliest centre where the style was formed. The style spread to the rest of Europe, and especially France gave a new direction in the late 17th century. Eventually it spread beyond Europe to the colonial possessions of the European powers, especially in Latin America and the Philippines.

The Protestant Reformation had brought an almost total stop to religious sculpture in much of Northern Europe, and though secular sculpture, especially for portrait busts and tomb monuments, continued, the Dutch Golden Age has no significant sculptural component outside goldsmithing. Partly in direct reaction, sculpture was as prominent in Catholicism as in the late Middle Ages. The Catholic Southern Netherlands saw a flourishing of Baroque sculpture starting from the second half of the 17th century with many local workshops producing a wide range of Baroque sculpture including church furniture, funeral monuments and small-scale sculptures executed in ivory and durable woods such as boxwood. Flemish sculptors would play a prominent role in spreading the Baroque idiom abroad including in the Dutch Republic, Italy, England, Sweden and France.

In the 18th century much sculpture continued on Baroque lines—the Trevi Fountain was only completed in 1762. The Rococo style was better suited to smaller works.

== Origins and Characteristics ==
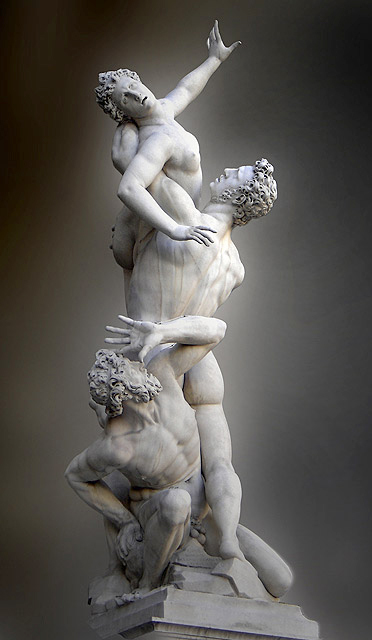
Rape of the Sabine Women by Giambologna (1581–1583), Piazza della Signoria, Florence

The Baroque style emerged from Renaissance sculpture, which, drawing upon classical Greek and Roman sculpture, had idealized the human form. This was modified by Mannerism, when artists strived to give their works a unique and personal style. Mannerism introduced the idea of sculptures featuring strong contrasts; youth and age, beauty and ugliness, men and women. Mannerism also introduced the figura serpentina, which became a major characteristic of Baroque sculpture. This was the arrangement of figures or groups of figures in an ascending spiral, which gave lightness and movement to the work.

Michelangelo had introduced figure serpentine in The Dying Slave (1513–1516) and Genius Victorious (1520–1525), but these works were meant to be seen from a single point of view. An example of work that can be seen from several points of view is the late 16th century sculpture of Giambologna, The Rape of the Sabine Women (1581–1583), which changes depending upon the viewpoint. This became a very common feature in Baroque sculpture. The work of Giambologna had a strong influence on the masters of the Baroque era, particularly Bernini.

Another important influence leading to the Baroque style was the Catholic Church, which was seeking artistic weapons in the battle against the rise of Protestantism. The Council of Trent (1545–1563) gave the Pope greater powers to guide artistic creation, and expressed a strong disapproval of the doctrines of humanism, which had been central to the arts during the Renaissance. During the pontificate of Paul V (1605–1621) the church began to develop artistic doctrines to counter the Reformation, and commissioned new artists to carry them out.

== Bernini and Roman Baroque sculpture ==
The dominant figure in Baroque sculpture was Gian Lorenzo Bernini (1598–1680). He was the son of a Florentine sculptor, Pietro Bernini, who had been called to Rome by Pope Paul V. The young Bernini made his first solo works at the age of fifteen, and in 1618–25 received a major commission for statues for the villa of Cardinal Scipion Borghese. His works, highly dramatic, designed to be seen from multiple ponts of view, and spiraling upwards, had an immense impact on European sculpture. He continued to dominate Italian sculpture through his works on Roman fountains, the Baldaquin of St. Peter and the tomb of Pope Alexander VII within St. Peter's Basilica, and his altar ensemble for the Church of Santa-Maria della Vittoria in Rome. He received his final fountain sculpture commission for the Fountain of the Elephant (1665–1667), followed by a series of angels for the Sant Angelo Bridge in Rome (1667–69).

Bernini died in 1680, but his style influenced sculptors across Europe, particularly in France, Bavaria and Austria.

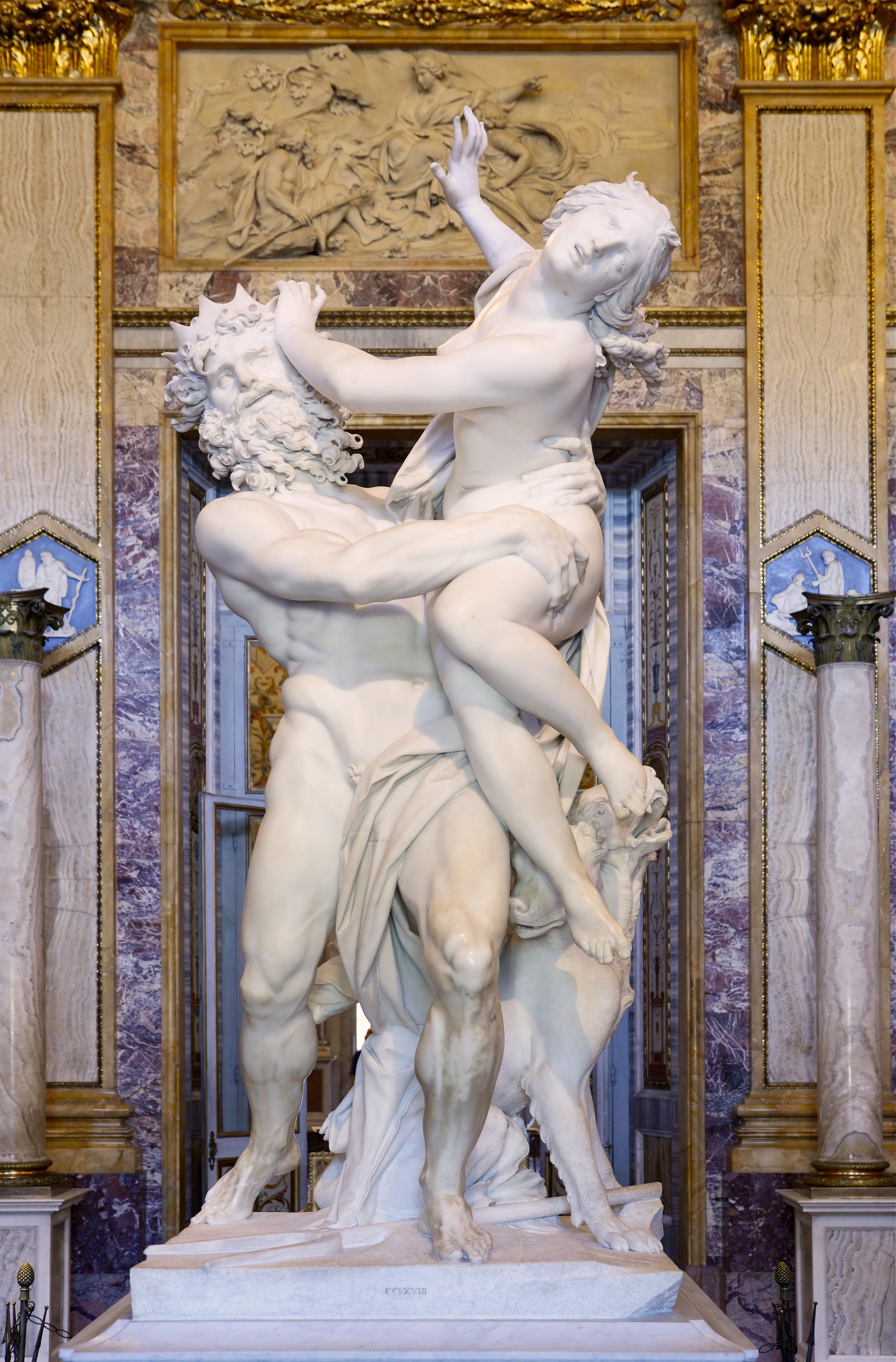
Rape of Proserpina (1621–1622) by Gian Lorenzo Bernini (Borghese Gallery)

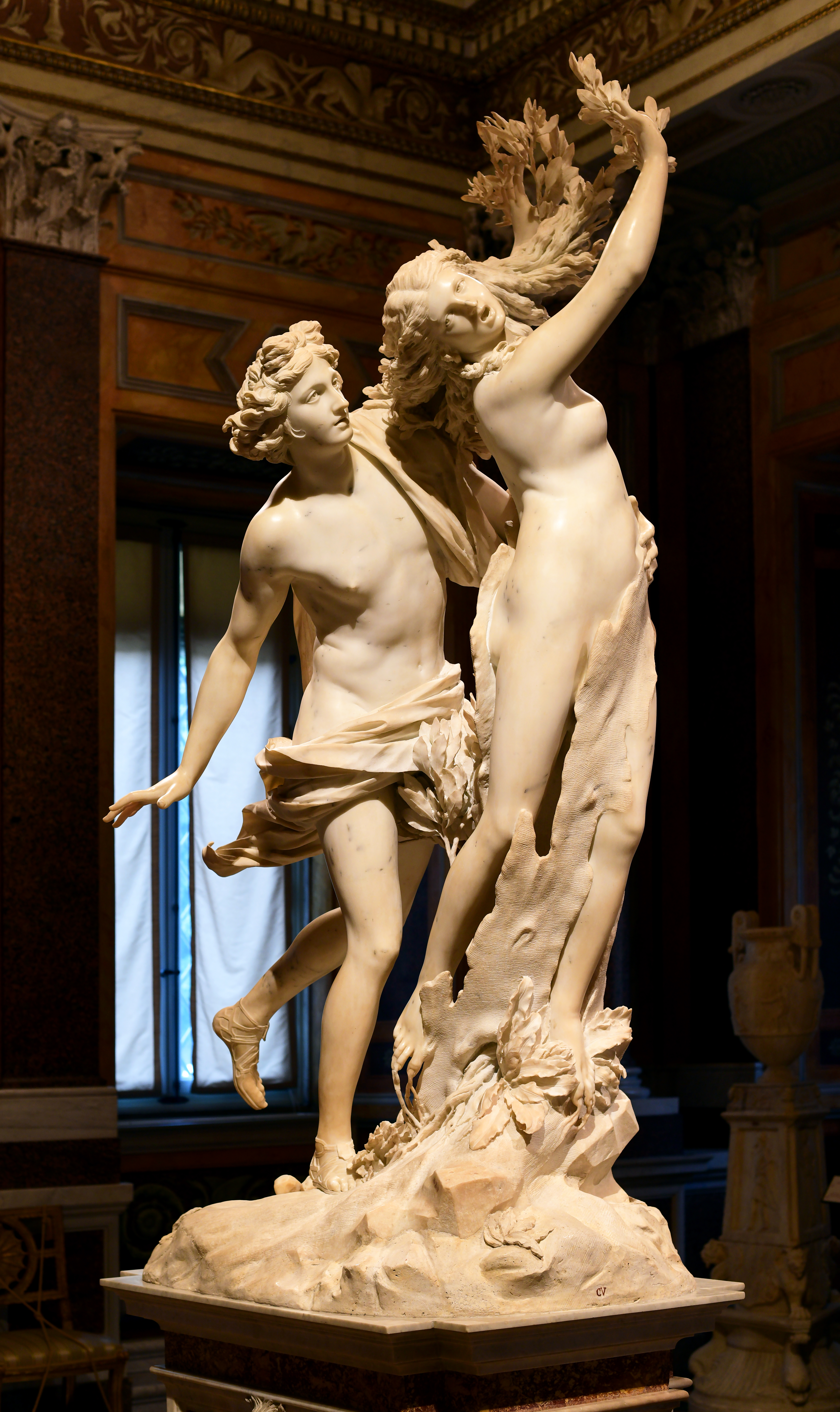
Apollo and Daphne (1622–1625) by Gian Lorenzo Bernini (Borghese Gallery)

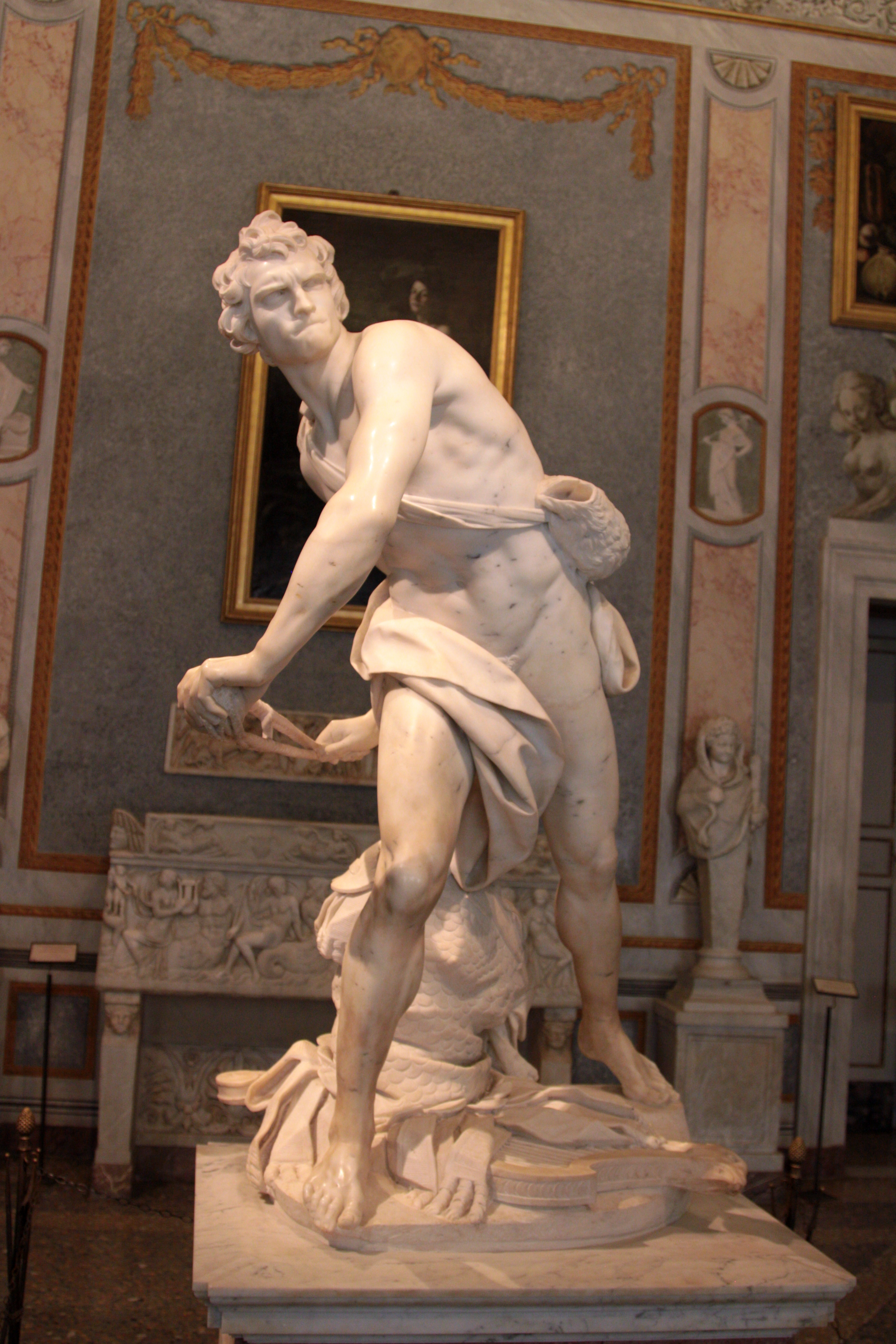
David (1623–1624) by Gian Lorenzo Bernini (Borghese Gallery)

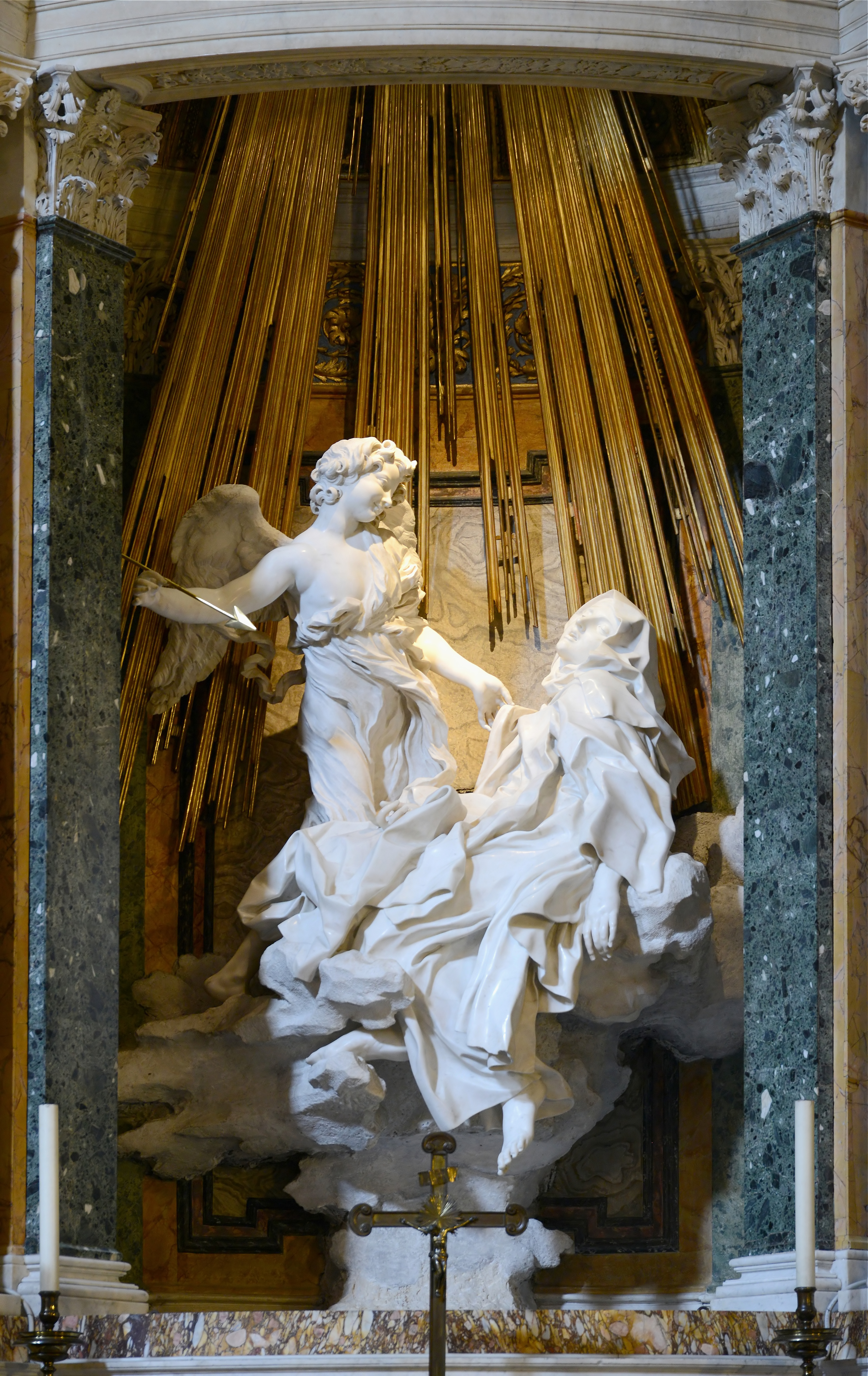
The Ecstasy of Saint Teresa (1647-1652), by Gian Lorenzo Bernini (Santa Maria Della Victoria, Rome)

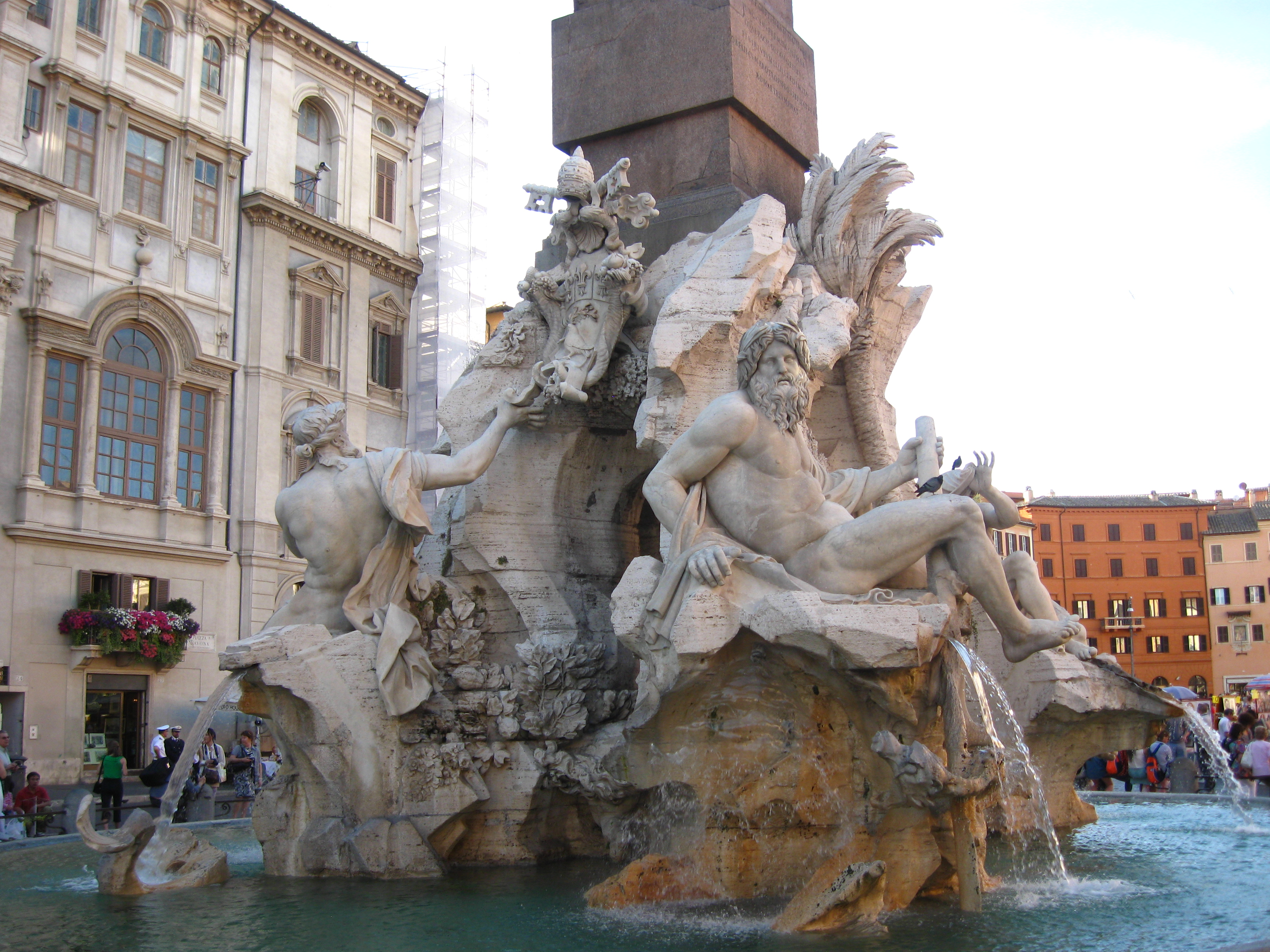
Fountain of the Four Rivers, Rome (1648-1651)

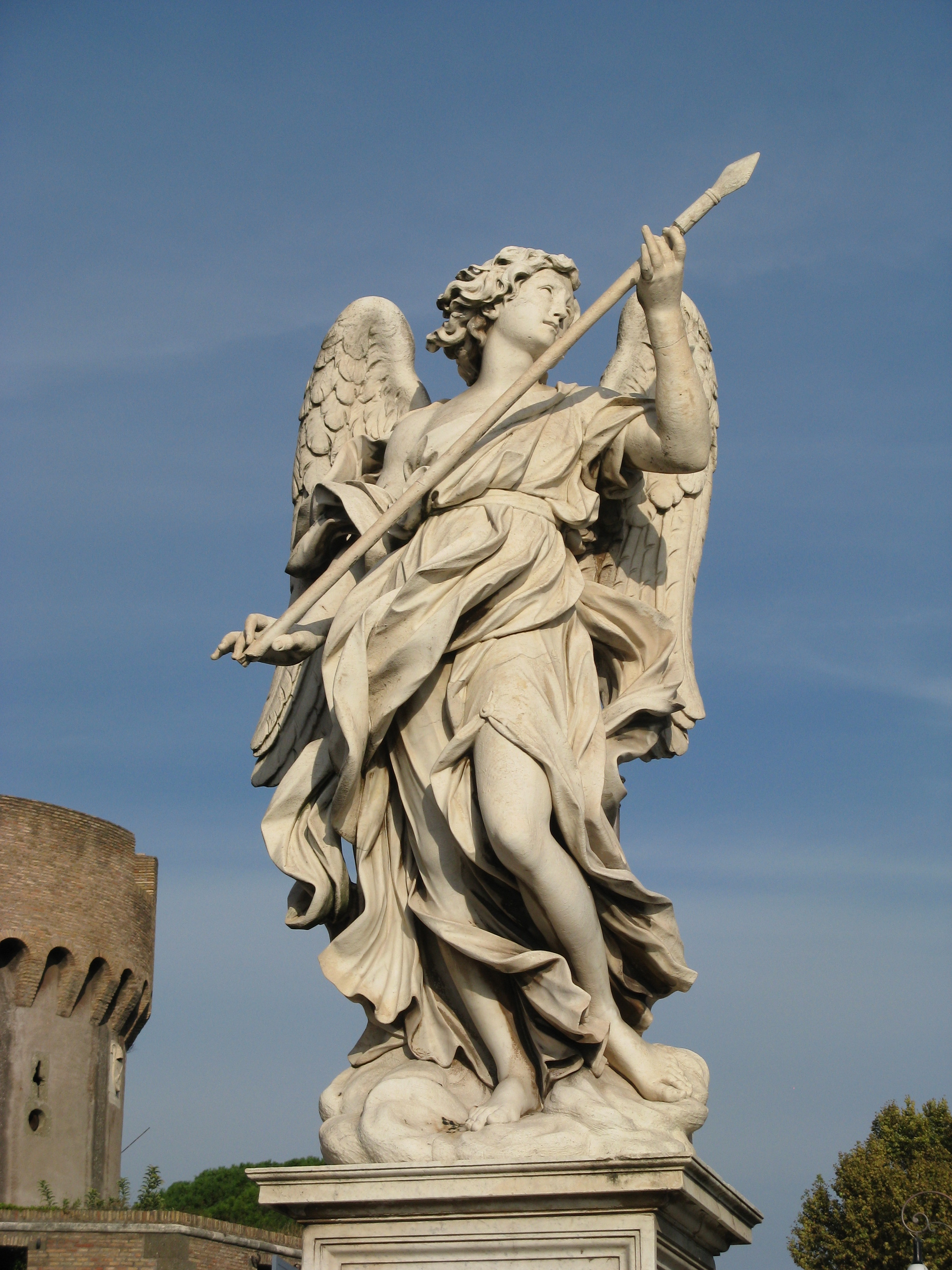
Angel with a Lance (1667-1669) Sant Angelo Bridge, Rome

=== Maderno, Mochi, and the other Italian Baroque sculptors ===
Generous papal commissions made Rome a magnet for sculptors in Italy and across Europe. They decorated churches, squares, and, a Rome specialty, the popular new fountains created around the city by the Popes. Stefano Maderno (1576–1636), originally from Bissone in Lombardy, preceded the work of Bernini. He began his career making reduced-size copies of classical works in bronze. His major large-scale work was a statue of Saint Cecilia (1600, for the Church of Saint Cecilia in the Trastevere in Rome. The saint's body lies stretched out, as if it were in a sarcophagus, evoking a sense of pathos.

Another early important Roman sculptor was Francesco Mochi (1580–1654), born in Montevarchi, near Florence. He made a celebrated bronze equestrian statue of Alexander Farnese for the main square of Piacenza (1620–1625), and a vivid statue of Saint Veronica for Saint Peter's Basilica, so active that she seems to be about to leap from the niche.

Other notable Italian Baroque sculptors included Alessandro Algardi (1598–1654), whose first major commission was the tomb of Pope Leo XI in the Vatican. He was considered a rival of Bernini, though his work was similar in style. His other major works included a large sculpted bas-relief of the legendary meeting between Pope Leo I and Attila the Hun (1646–1653), in which the Pope persuaded Attila not to attack Rome.

The Flemish sculptor François Duquesnoy (1597–1643) was another important figure of the Italian Baroque. He was a friend of the painter Poussin, and was especially known for his statue of Saint Susanna at Santa Maria de Loreto in Rome, and his statue of Saint Andrew (1629–1633) at the Vatican. He was named royal sculptor of Louis XIII, but died in 1643 during the journey from Rome to Paris.

Major sculptors in the late period included Niccolo Salvi (1697–1751), whose most famous work was the design of the Trevi Fountain (1732–1751). The fountain also contained allegorical works by other prominent Italian Baroque sculptors, including Filippo della Valle Pietro Bracci, and Giovanni Grossi. The fountain, in all its grandeur and exuberance, represented the final act of the Italian Baroque style.

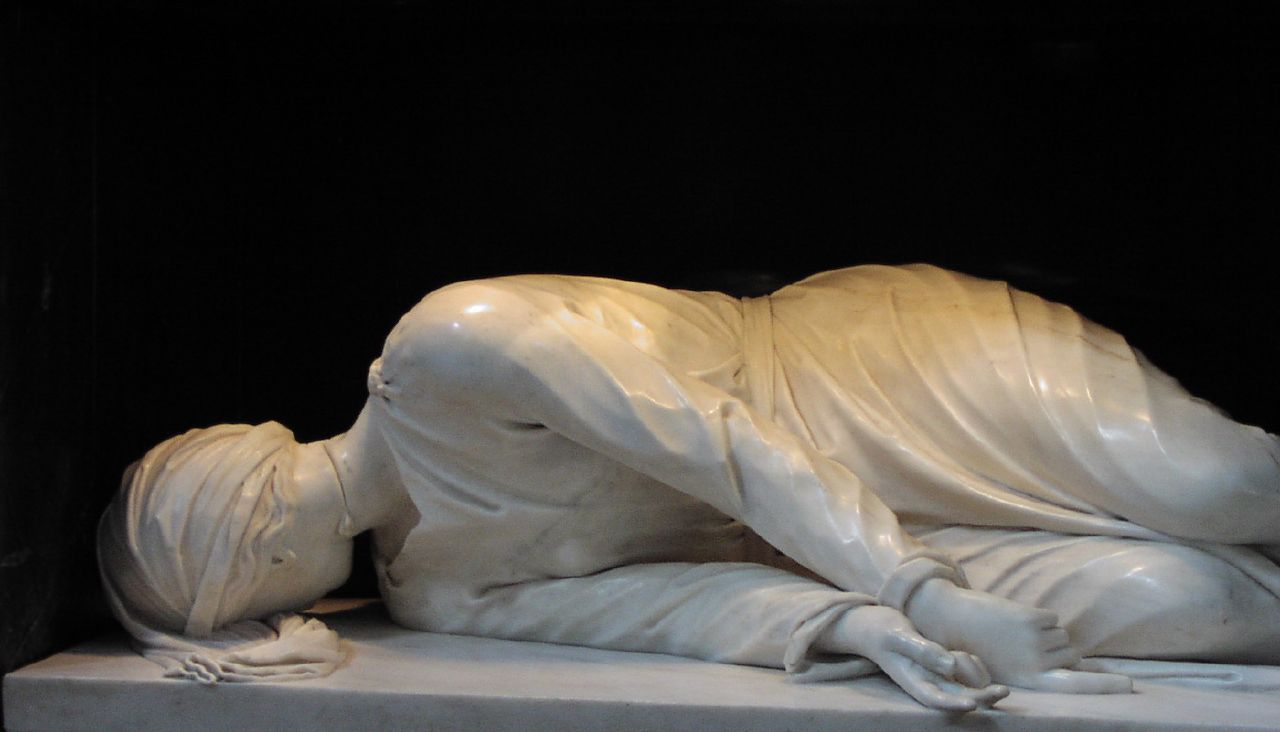
Saint Cecilia (1599) by Stefano Maderno, Santa Cecelia in Trastevere

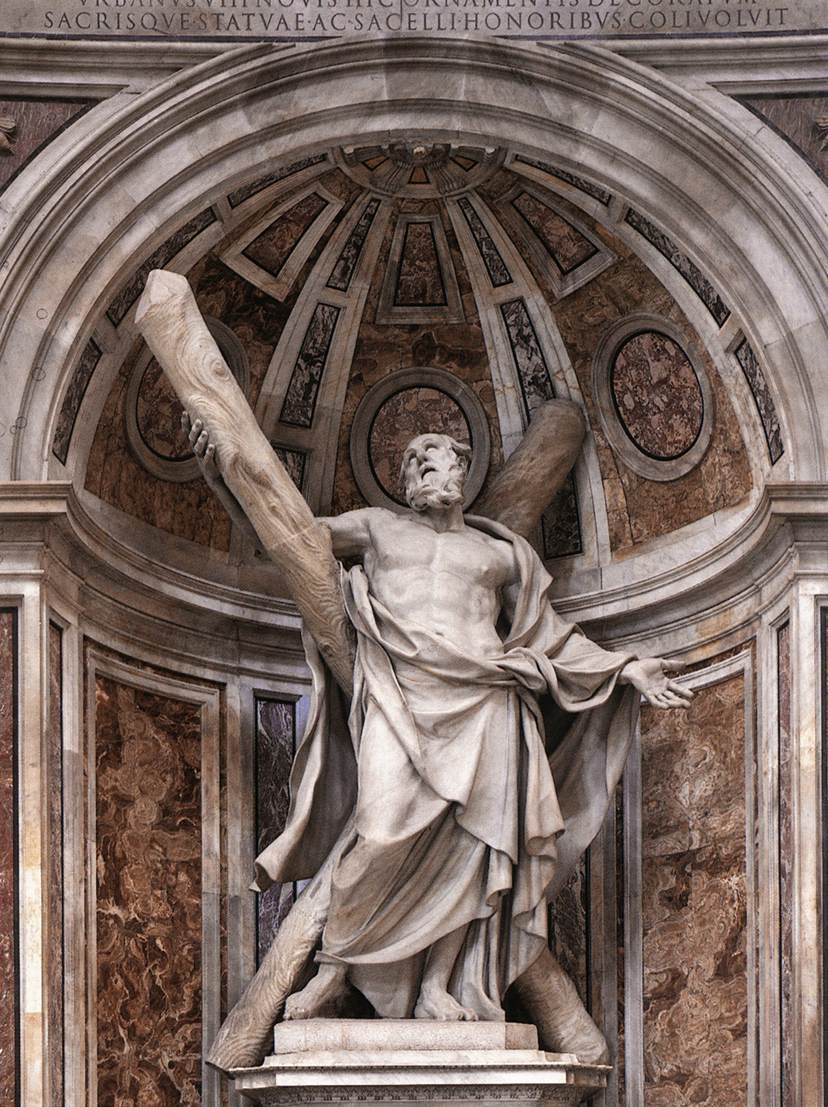
Saint Andrew by François Duquesnoy (1629–33), St. Peter's Basilica

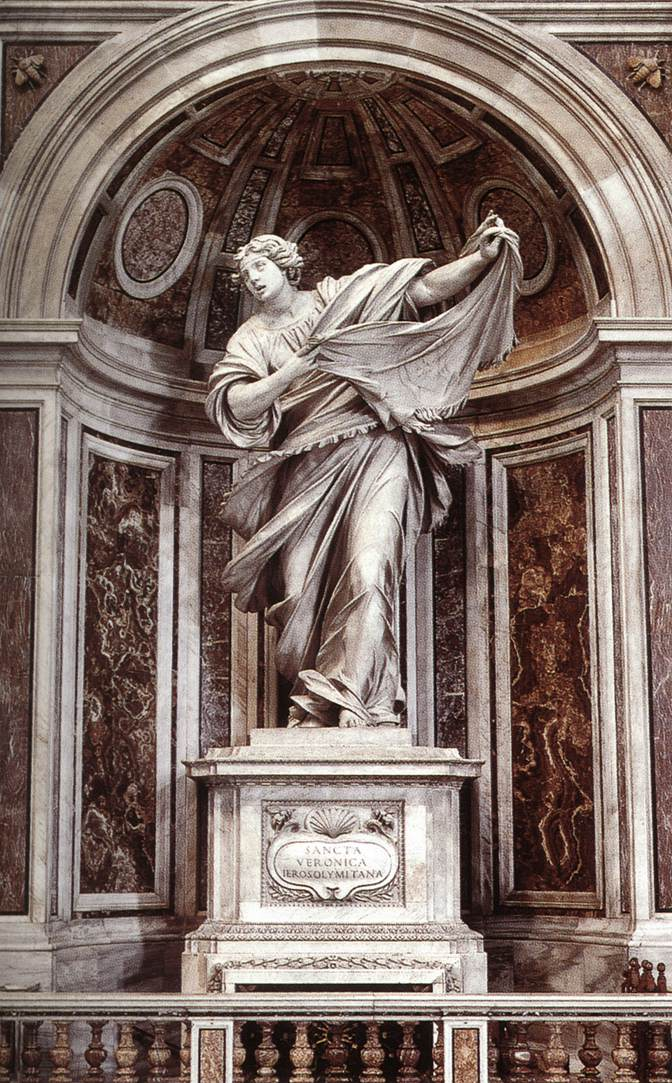
Saint Veronica by Francesco Mochi (1640), the Vatican

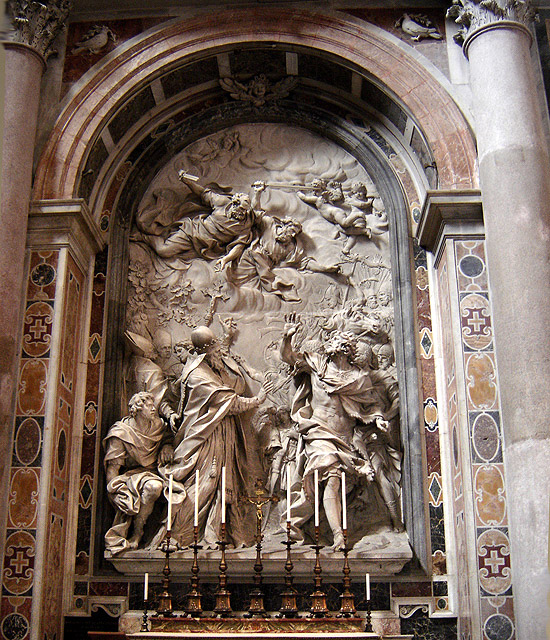
The meeting of Attila the Hun and Pope Leo I by Alessandro Algardi

== France ==
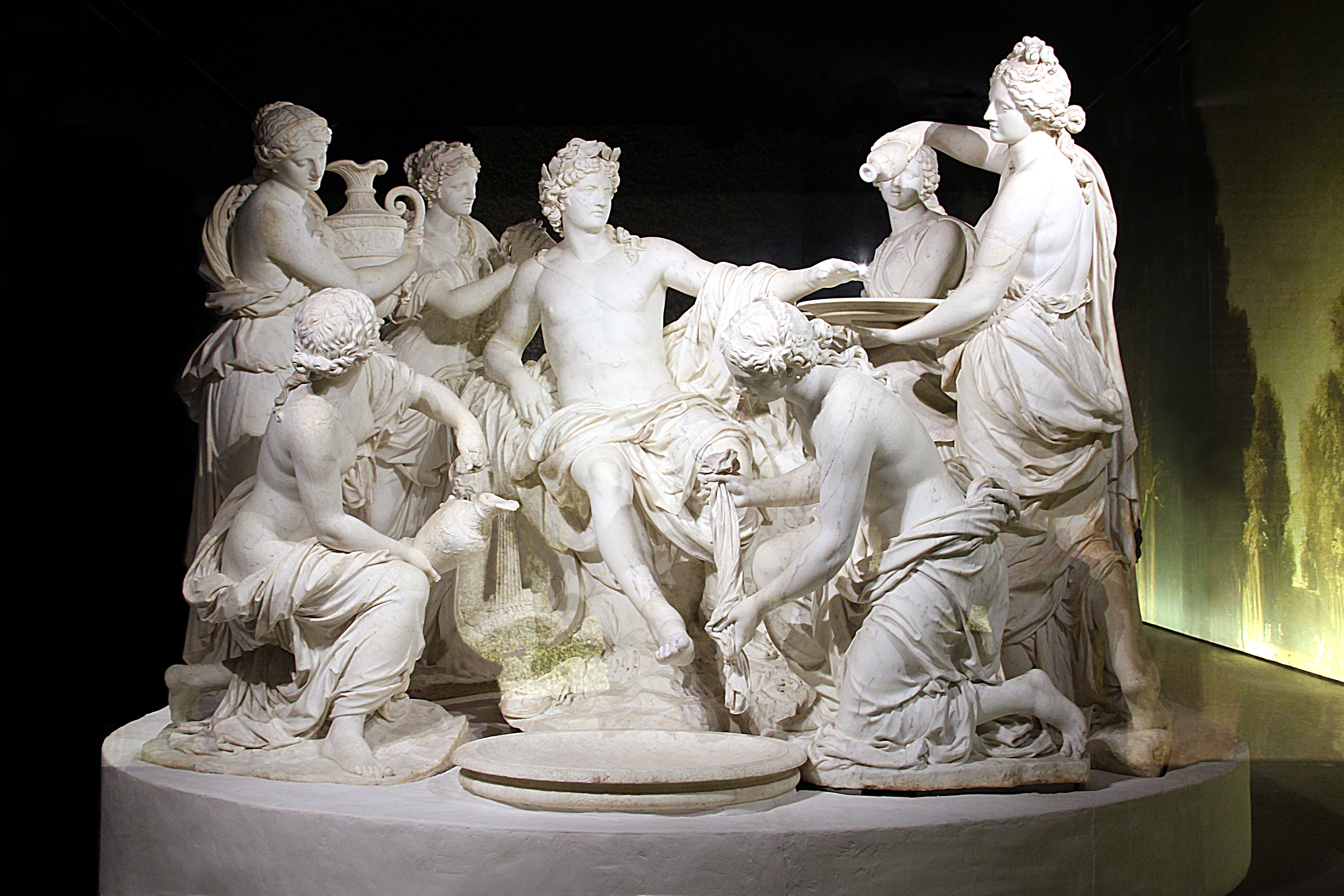
François Girardon, Apollo served by nymphs, Palace of Versailles (1666)

The major part of French Baroque sculpture was intended to glorify not the Church, but the French monarchs - Louis XIII, Louis XIV, and Louis XV. Though baroque sculpture already emerged in the 1630s in France with the likes of Jacques Sarazin and Philippe de Buyster, much of it was produced by the sculptors of the new Royal Academy of Painting and Sculpture, founded in 1648 and later closely supervised by Jean-Baptiste Colbert the King's Minister of Finance. French sculptors worked closely together with painters, architects, and landscape designers such as André Le Notre to create the sculptural effects found in the Palace of Versailles and its gardens, the other royal residences, and the statues for new city squares created in Paris and other French cities. Colbert also established the French Academy in Rome so French sculptors and painters could study classical models.

In the early part of the Baroque period, French sculptors, like Pierre de Francqueville, were largely influenced by artists from Flanders and the Netherlands, particularly the Mannerism of Giambologna. But the sculptors Simon Guillain (1581-1658) and Jacques Sarazin (1592–1660) spent part of their training in Italy when the baroque style was gaining popularity, before returning to France. Bernini himself, at the peak of his fame, came to Paris in 1665 to present his own plan for the Louvre to Louis XIV. The King and his ministers did not like Bernini's work, and the plan was rejected, though Bernini produced a fine bust of Louis XIV, which was greatly admired and is now on display at the Palace of Versailles.

The best French sculptors were engaged to make statues for the fountains gardens of the Palace of Versailles and other royal residences. These included Pierre Puget, who was active in Italy before working for Louis XIV, Jacques Sarazin, François Girardon, who created the large Apollo served by nymphs marble group for Versailles gardens in 1666, Jean-Baptiste Tuby, Antoine Coysevox, who made several bust portraits and equestrian statues of Louis XIV and Nicolas Coustou. In the 18th century, Guillaume Coustou, Nicolas' younger brother, created a particularly celebrated group of horses for the gardens of the Château de Marly, known as the Marly Horses.

Some important French sculptors were mainly active in Italy, especially in Rome, like Nicolas Cordier in the early 1600s, and later in the century Pierre Le Gros the Younger and Pierre-Etienne Monnot, who adopted a more berninian style.

In the later years of the Baroque era, Jean-Baptiste Pigalle (1714-1785) and Jean Baptiste Lemoyne (1704–1778), Director of the French Academy in Rome, were considered the finest rococo sculptors, along Robert Le Lorrain, Michel-Ange Slodtz, Lambert Sigisbert Adam, Étienne Maurice Falconet and Clodion. Edme Bouchardon's work marked an early transition between the rocaille and a more severe classicism while Lemoyne's pupil, Jean-Antoine Houdon led the transition of French sculpture from the Baroque to neoclassicism.

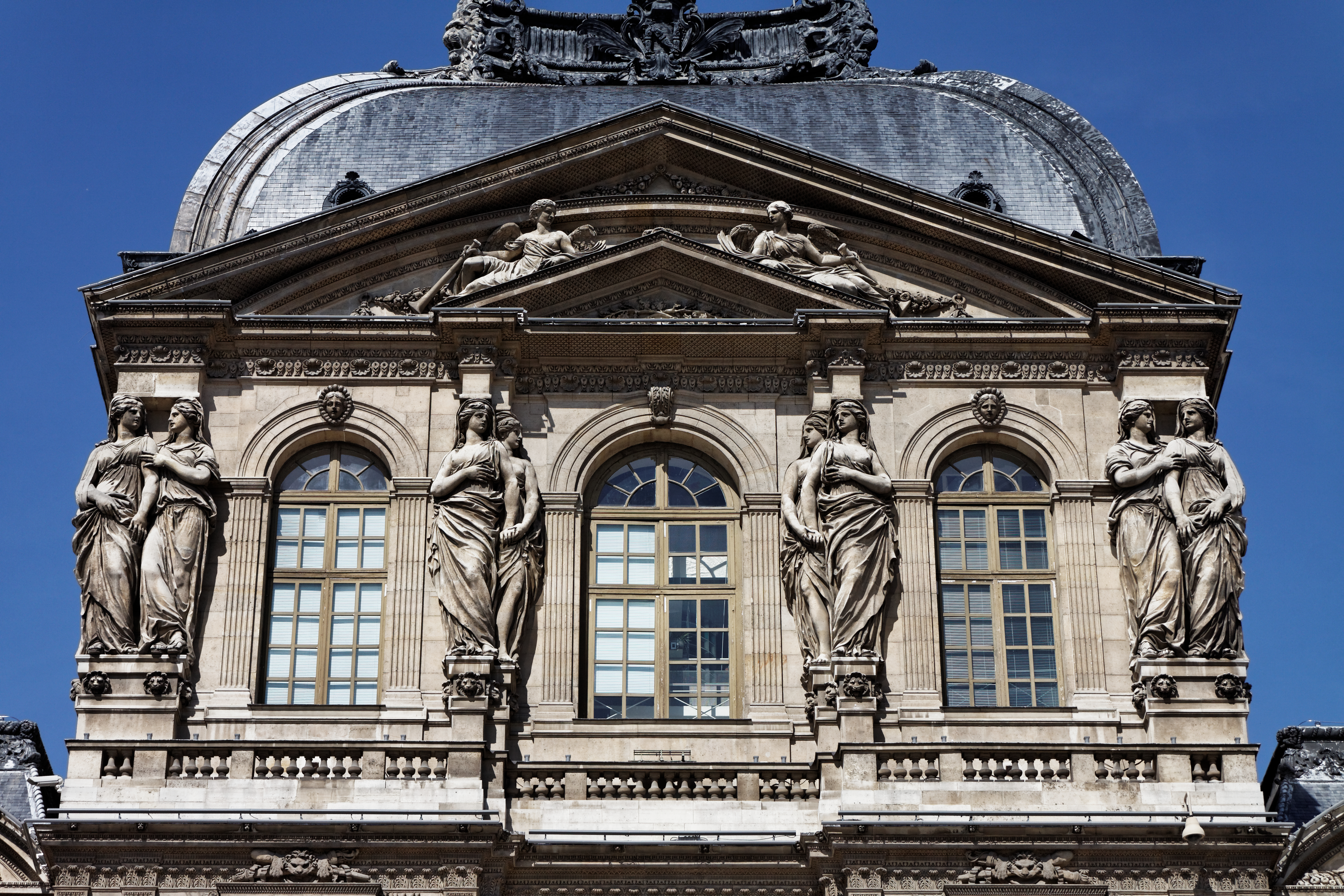
Caryatides on the Pavillon de l'Horloge by Jacques Sarazin, Louvre Palace (1639–40)

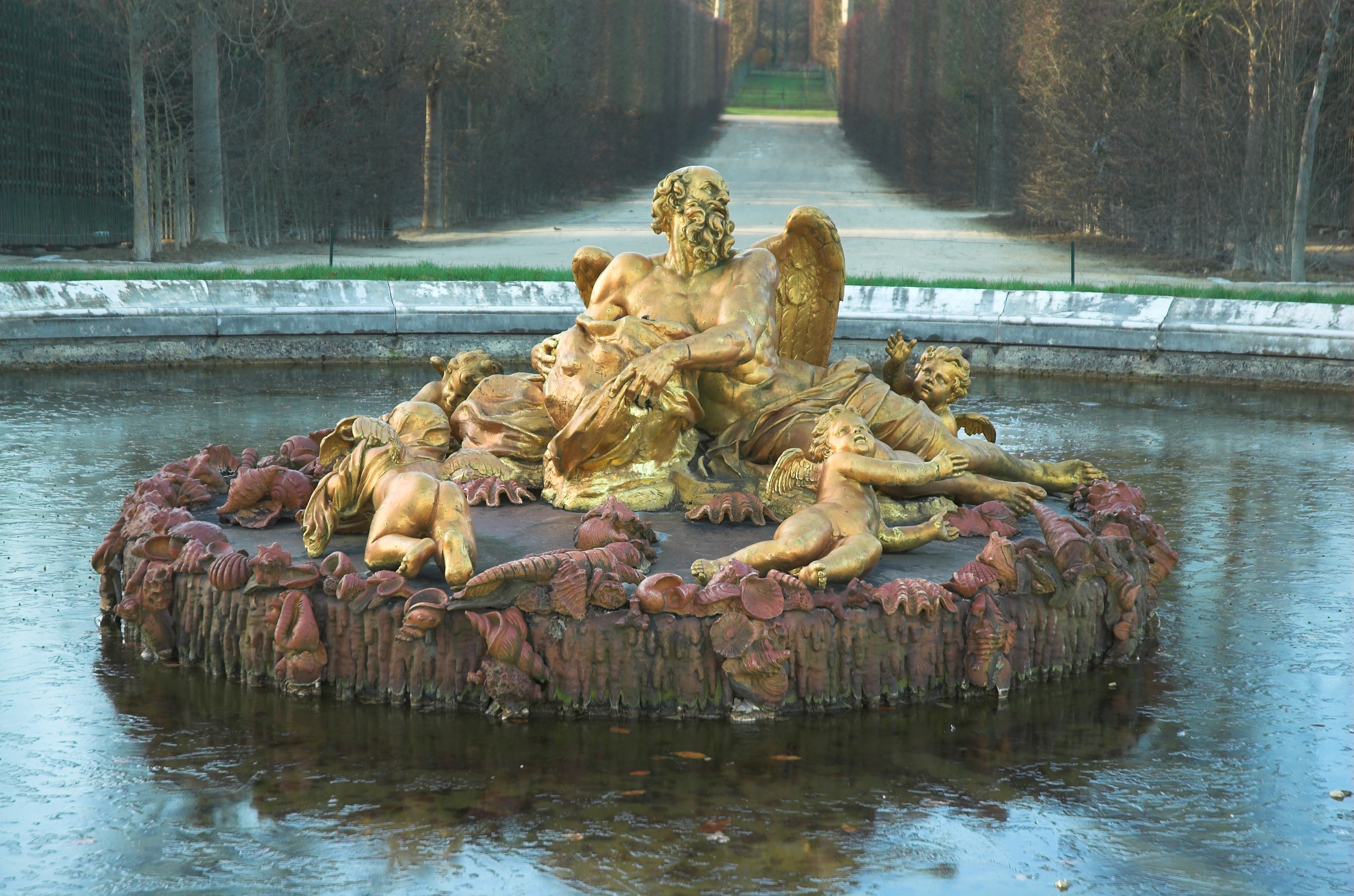
Basin of Saturn, François Girardon, Palace of Versailles (1672-1677)

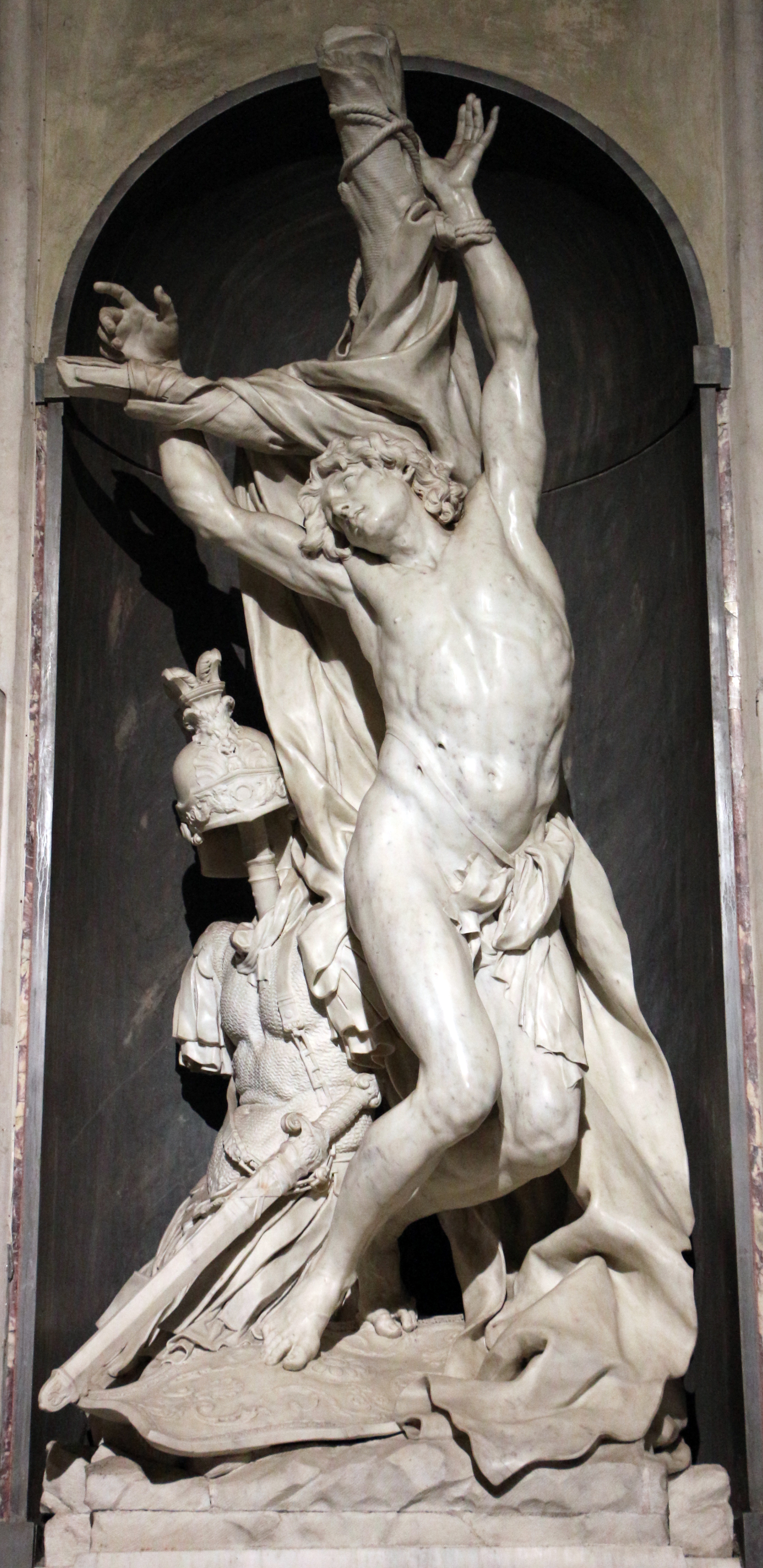
Pierre Puget, Saint Sebastian, Santa Maria Assunta di Carignano, Genoa, 1668

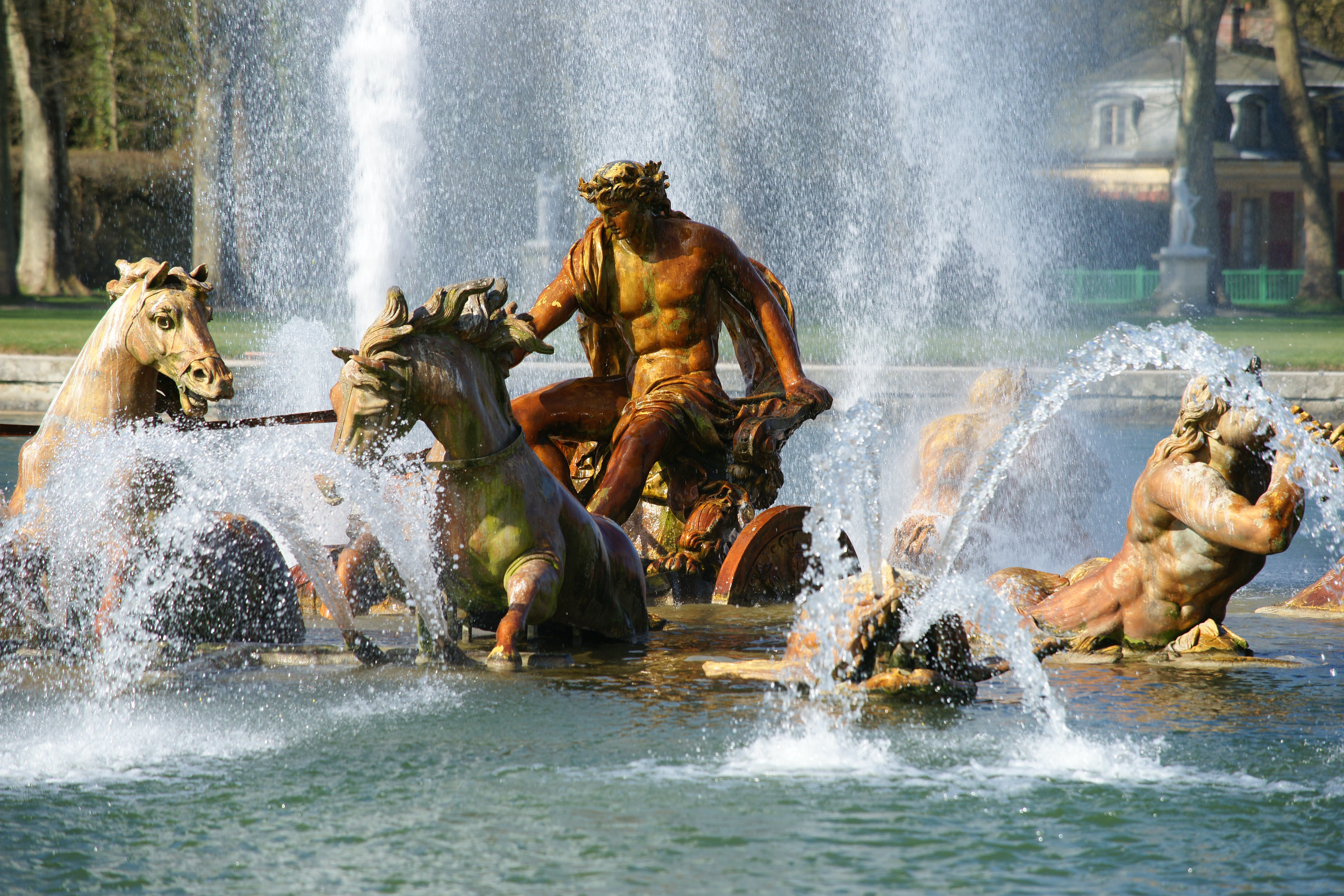
Jean-Baptiste Tuby, Chariot of Apollo, gardens of the Palace of Versailles (1668–70)

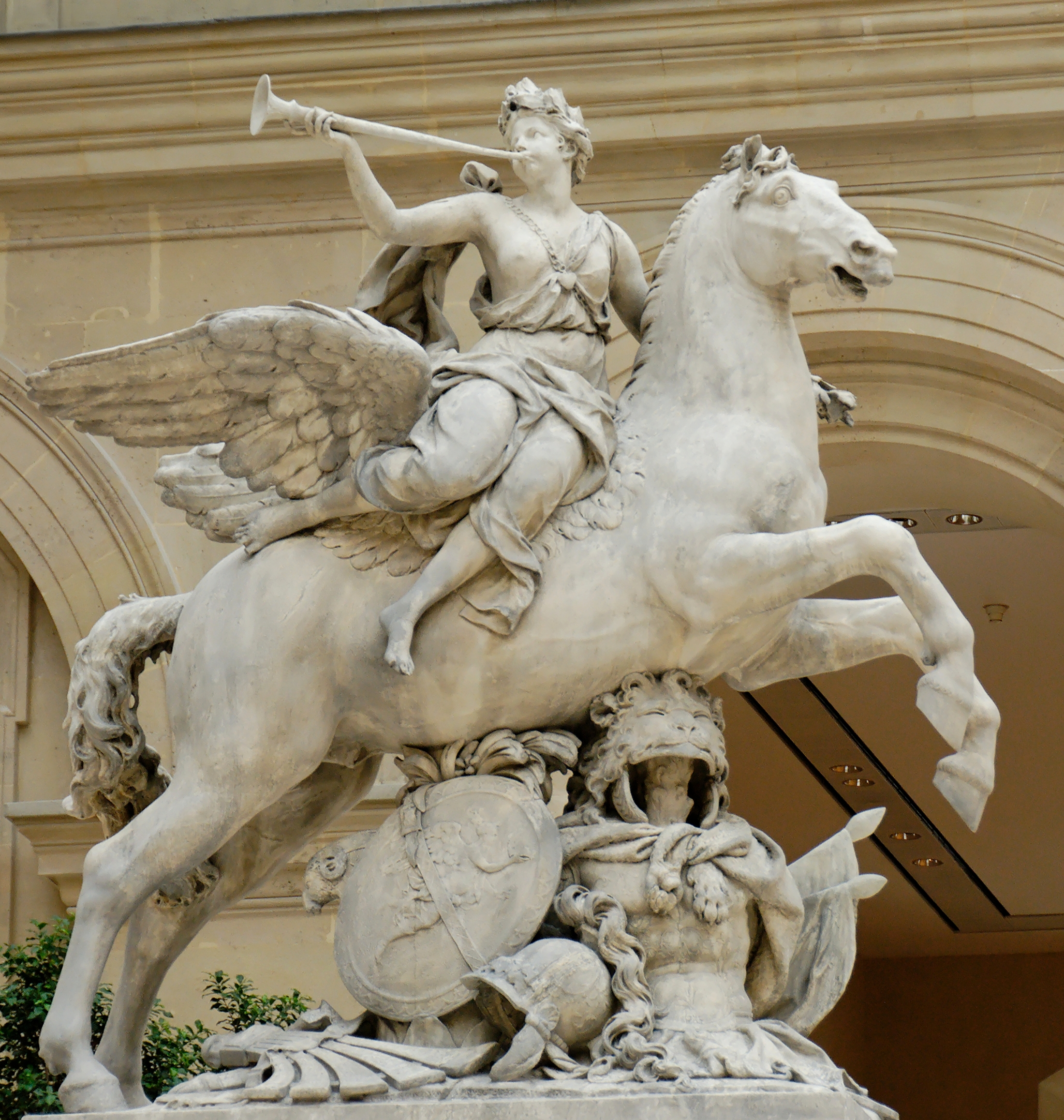
Fame Riding Pegasus by Antoine Coysevox for Marly, now in Louvre (1701-1702)

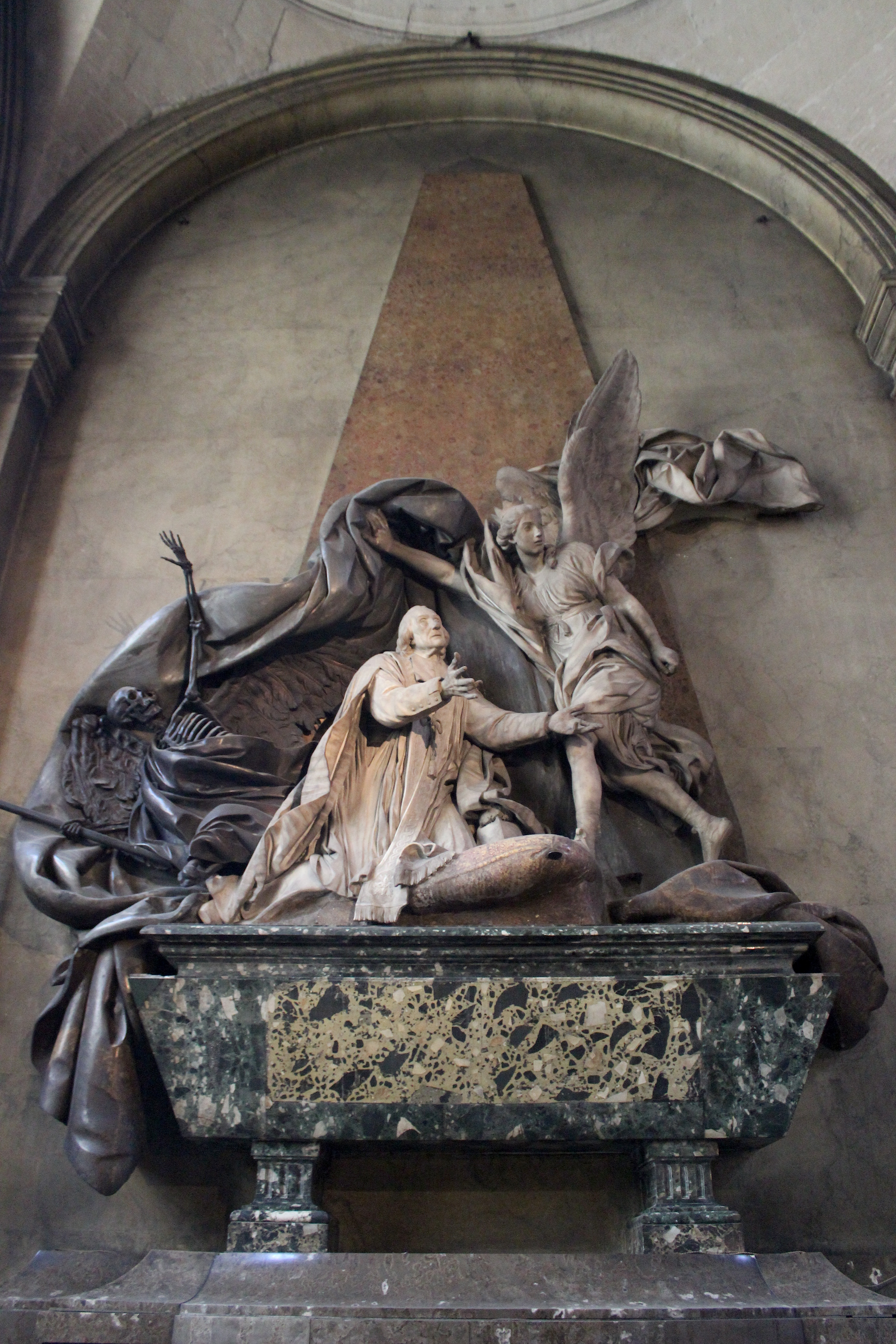
Michel-Ange Slodtz, Funerary monument of Jean-Baptiste Languet de Gergy, Saint-Sulpice, Paris (1757)

== The Southern Netherlands ==
The Southern Netherlands, which remained under Spanish, Roman Catholic rule, played an important role in spreading Baroque sculpture in Northern Europe. The Roman Catholic Contrareformation demanded that artists created paintings and sculptures in church contexts that would speak to the illiterate rather than to the well-informed. The Contrareformation stressed certain points of religious doctrine, as a result of which certain church furniture, such as the confessional gained an increased importance. These developments caused a sharp increase in the demand for religious sculpture in the Southern Netherlands. A pivotal role was played by the Brussels sculptor François Duquesnoy who worked for most of his career in Rome. His more elaborate Baroque style closer to that of the Classicism of Bernini was spread in the Southern Netherlands through his brother Jérôme and other Flemish artists who studied in his workshop in Rome such as Rombaut Pauwels and possibly Artus Quellinus the Elder.

The most prominent sculptor was Artus Quellinus the Elder, a member of a family of famous sculptors and painters, and the cousin and master of another prominent Flemish sculptor, Artus Quellinus the Younger. Born in Antwerp, he had spent time in Rome where he became familiar with local Baroque sculpture and that of his compatriot François Duquesnoy. On his return to Antwerp in 1640, he brought with him a new vision of the role of the sculptor. The sculptor was no longer to be an ornamentalist but a creator of a total artwork in which architectural components were replaced by sculptures. The church furniture became an occasion for the creation of large-scale compositions, incorporated into the church interior. From 1650 onwards, Quellinus worked for 15 years on the new city hall of Amsterdam together with the lead architect Jacob van Campen. Now called the Royal Palace on the Dam, this construction project, and in particular the marble decorations he and his workshop produced, became an example for other buildings in Amsterdam. The team of sculptors that Artus supervised during his work on the Amsterdam city hall included many sculptors, mainly from Flanders, who would become leading sculptors in their own right such as his cousin Artus Quellinus II, Rombout Verhulst, Bartholomeus Eggers and Gabriël Grupello and probably also Grinling Gibbons. They would later spread his Baroque idiom in the Dutch Republic, Germany and England. Another important Flemish Baroque sculptor was Lucas Faydherbe (1617-1697) who was from Mechelen, the second important centre of Baroque sculpture in the Southern Netherlands. He trained in Antwerp in Rubens's workshop and played a major role in the spread of High Baroque sculpture in the Southern Netherlands.

While the Southern Netherlands had witnessed a steep decline in the level of the output and reputation of its painting school in the second half of the 17th century, sculpture replaced painting in importance, under the impulse of domestic and international demand and the massive, high-quality output of a number of family workshops in Antwerp. In particular, the workshops of Quellinus, Jan and Robrecht Colyn de Nole, Jan and Cornelis van Mildert, Hubrecht and Norbert van den Eynde, Peter I, Peter II and Hendrik Frans Verbrugghen, Willem and Willem Ignatius Kerricx, Pieter Scheemaeckers and Lodewijk Willemsens produced a wide range of sculpture including church furniture, funeral monuments and small-scale sculpture executed in ivory and durable woods such as boxwood. While Artus Quellinus the Elder represented the high Baroque, a more exuberant phase of the Baroque referred to as late Baroque commenced from the 1660s. During this phase the works became more theatrical, manifested through religious-ecstatic representations and lavish, showy decorations.

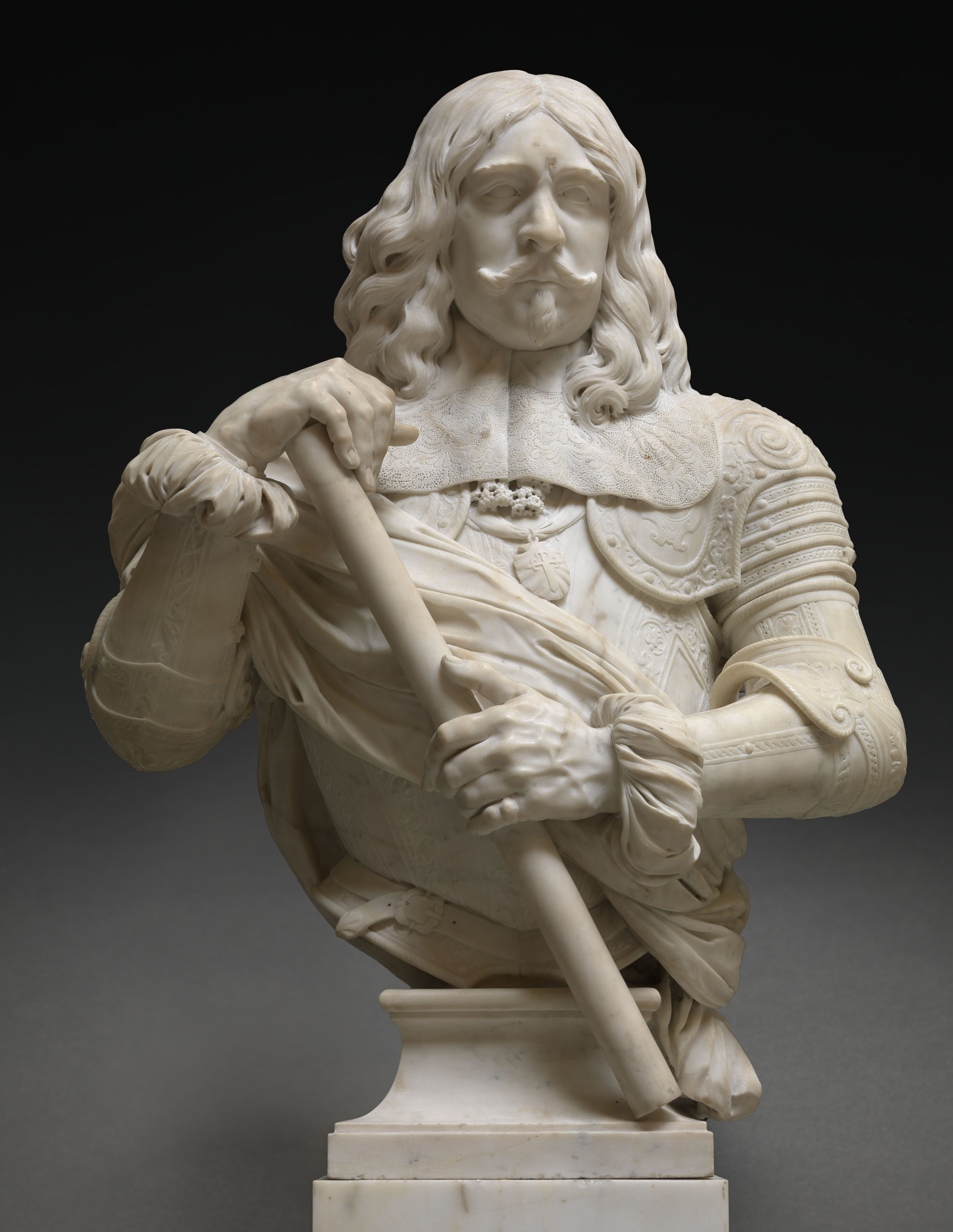
Luis de Benavides Carrillo, Marquis of Caracena by Artus Quellinus the Elder (1664), Royal Museum of Fine Arts Antwerp

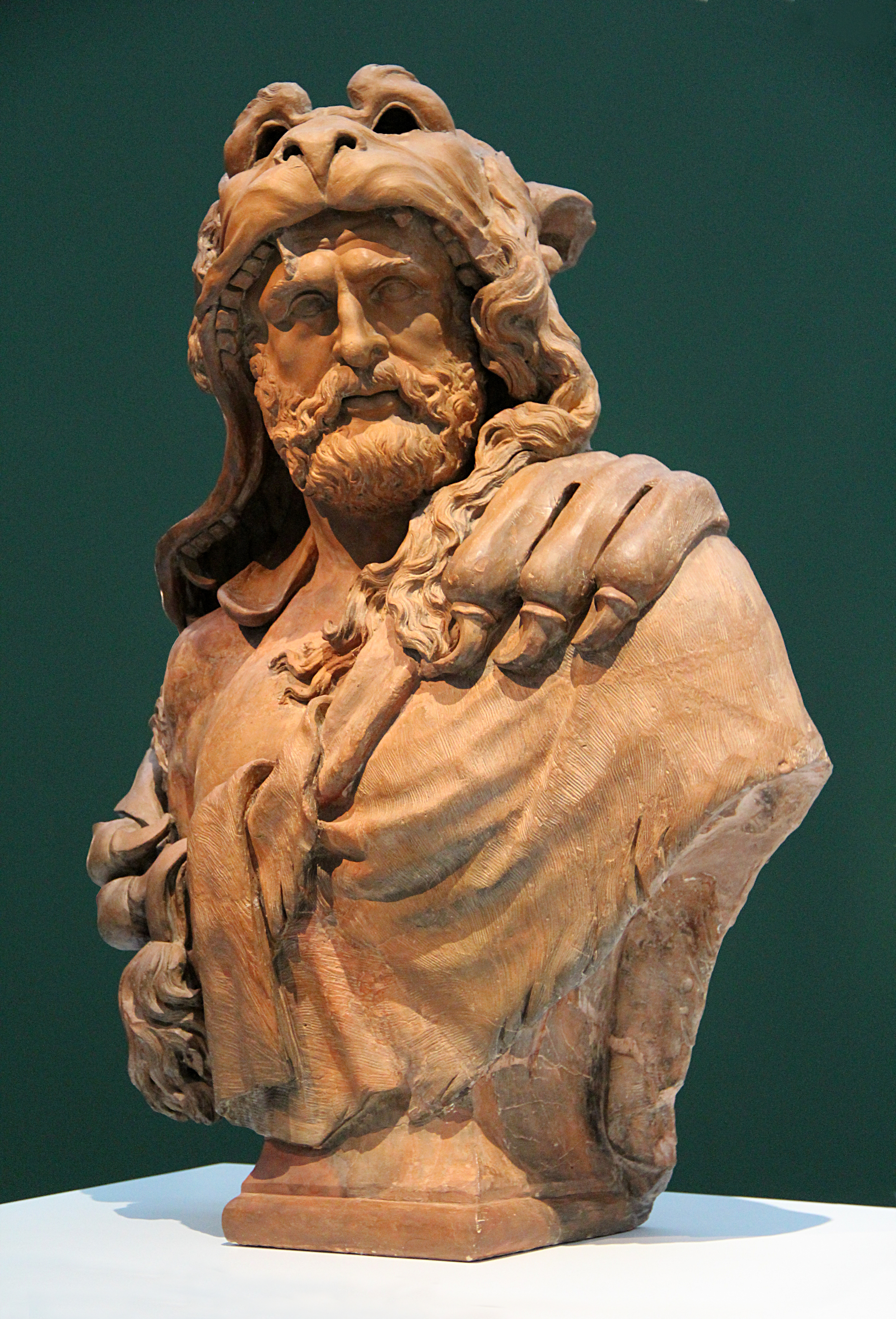
Hercules, by Lucas Faydherbe (1640-1650), Musée du Louvre-Lens

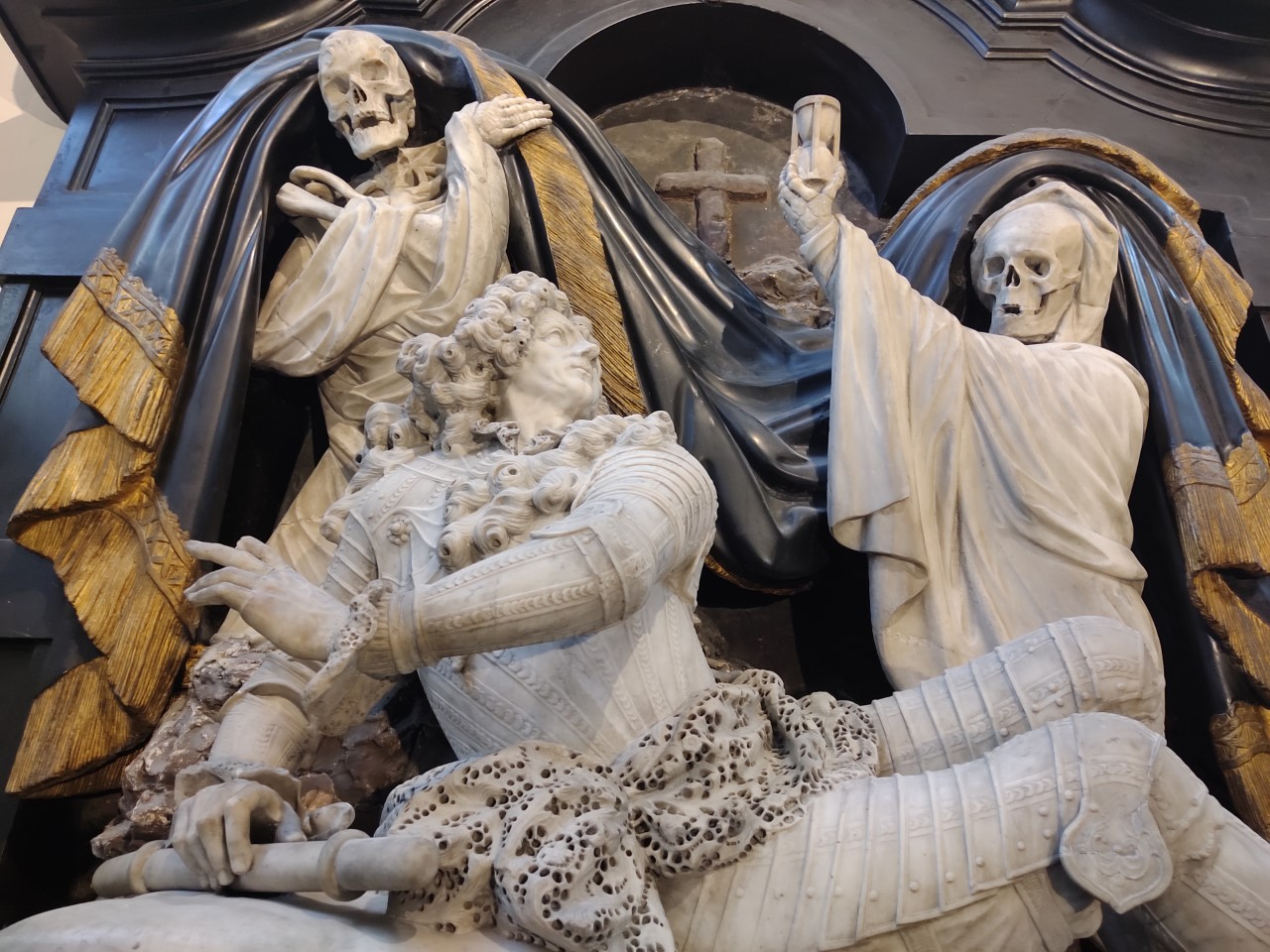
Funerary monument for Marcas De Velasco, by Pieter Scheemaeckers (1694-1697), St. James Church in Antwerp

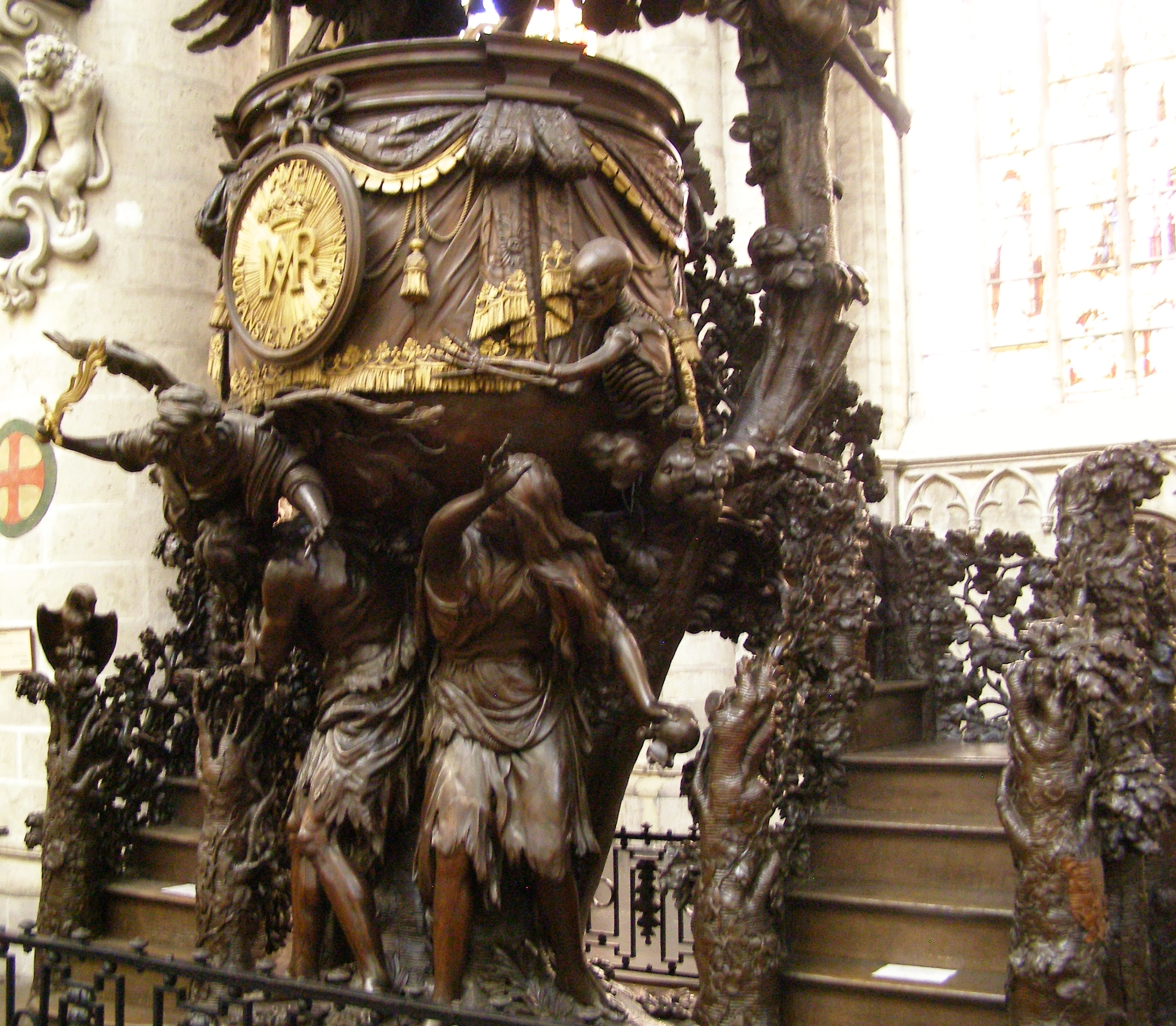
Pulpit of Brussels Cathedral, by Hendrik Frans Verbruggen (1695-1699)

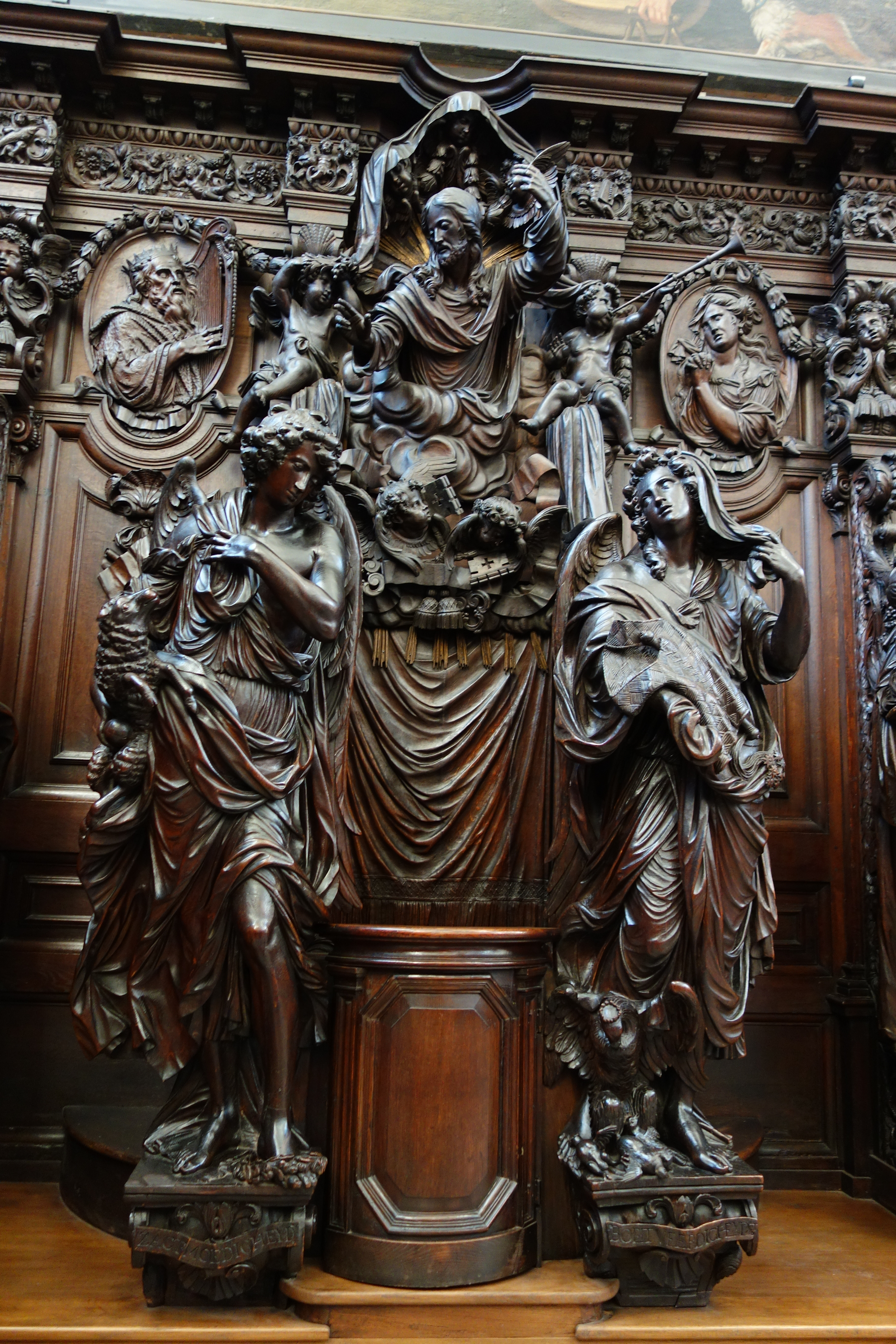
The last judgement by Willem Kerricx (1695-1699), St. Paul's Church, Antwerp

== The Dutch Republic ==
After breaking sway from Spain, the predominantly Calvinist Dutch Republic produced one sculptor of international repute, Hendrick de Keyser (1565–1621). He also was the chief architect of Amsterdam, and creator of major churches and monuments. His most famous work of sculpture is the tomb of William the Silent (1614–1622) in the Nieuwe Kerk in Delft. The tomb was sculpted of marble, originally black but now white, with bronze statues representing William the Silent, Glory at his feet, and the four Cardinal Virtues at the corners. Since the church was Calvinist, the female figures of the Cardinal Virtues were completely clothed from head to foot.

Pupils and assistants of the Flemish sculptor Artus Quellinus the Elder who from 1650 onwards worked for fifteen years on the new city hall in Amsterdam played an important role in the spread of Baroque sculpture in the Dutch Republic. Now called the Royal Palace on the Dam, this construction project, and in particular the marble decorations he and his workshop produced, became an example for other buildings in Amsterdam. The many Flemish sculptors who joined Quellinus to work on this project had an important influence on Dutch Baroque sculpture. They include Rombout Verhulst who became the leading sculptor of marble monuments, including funerary monuments, garden figures and portraits in the Dutch Republic.

Other Flemish sculptors who contributed to sprfead of the Baroque style in sculpture in the Dutch Republic were Jan Claudius de Cock, Jan Baptist Xavery, Pieter Xavery, Bartholomeus Eggers and Francis van Bossuit. Some of them trained local sculptors. For instance the Dutch sculptor Johannes Ebbelaer (c. 1666-1706) likely received training from Rombout Verhulst, Pieter Xavery and Francis van Bossuit. Van Bossuit is believed to have also been the master of Ignatius van Logteren. Van Logteren and his son Jan van Logteren left an important mark on the entire 18th century Amsterdam facade architecture and decoration. Their work forms the last summit of the late Baroque and the first Rococo style in sculpture in the Dutch Republic.

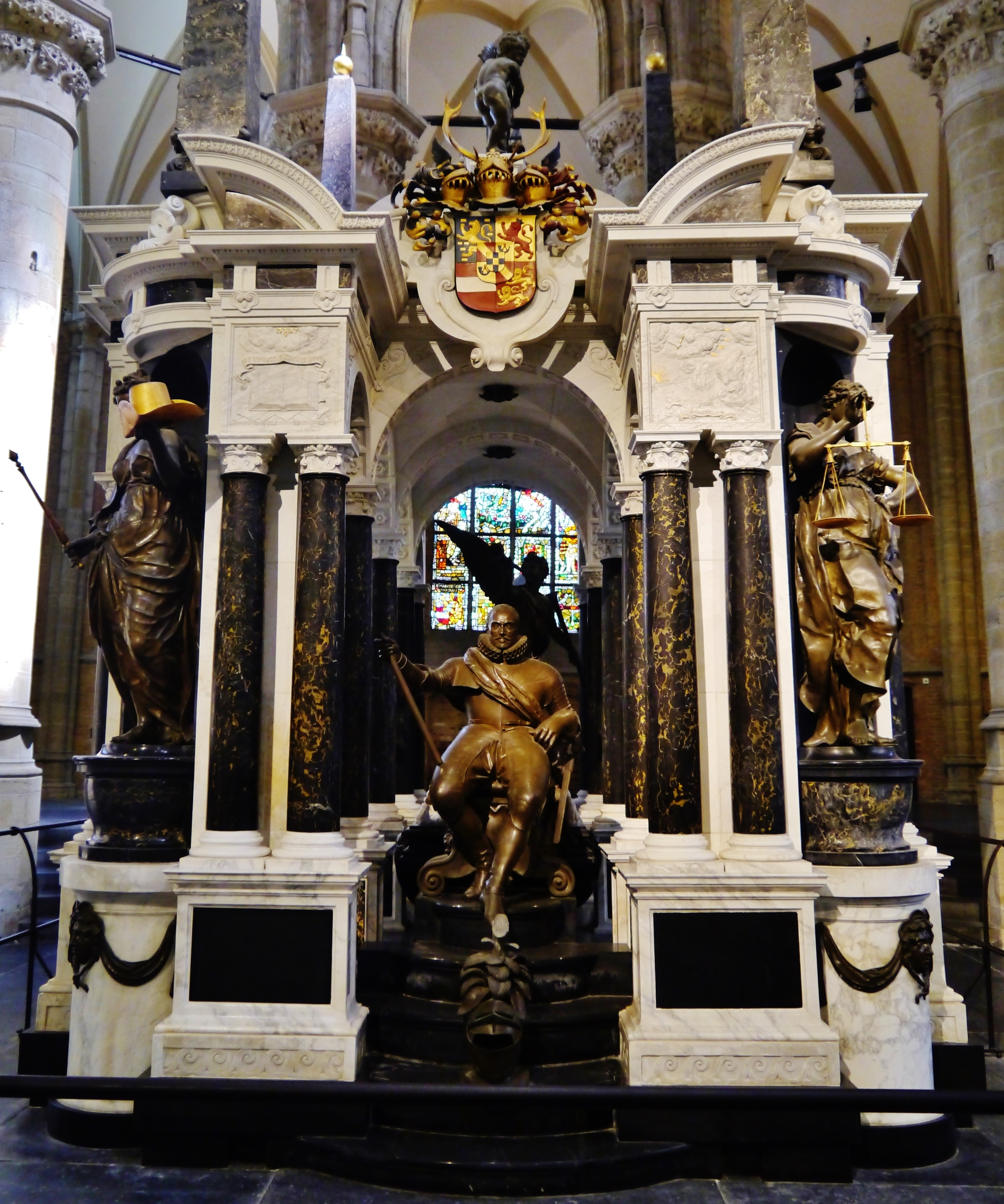
Tomb of William the Silent by Hendrick de Keyser (1614-1622)

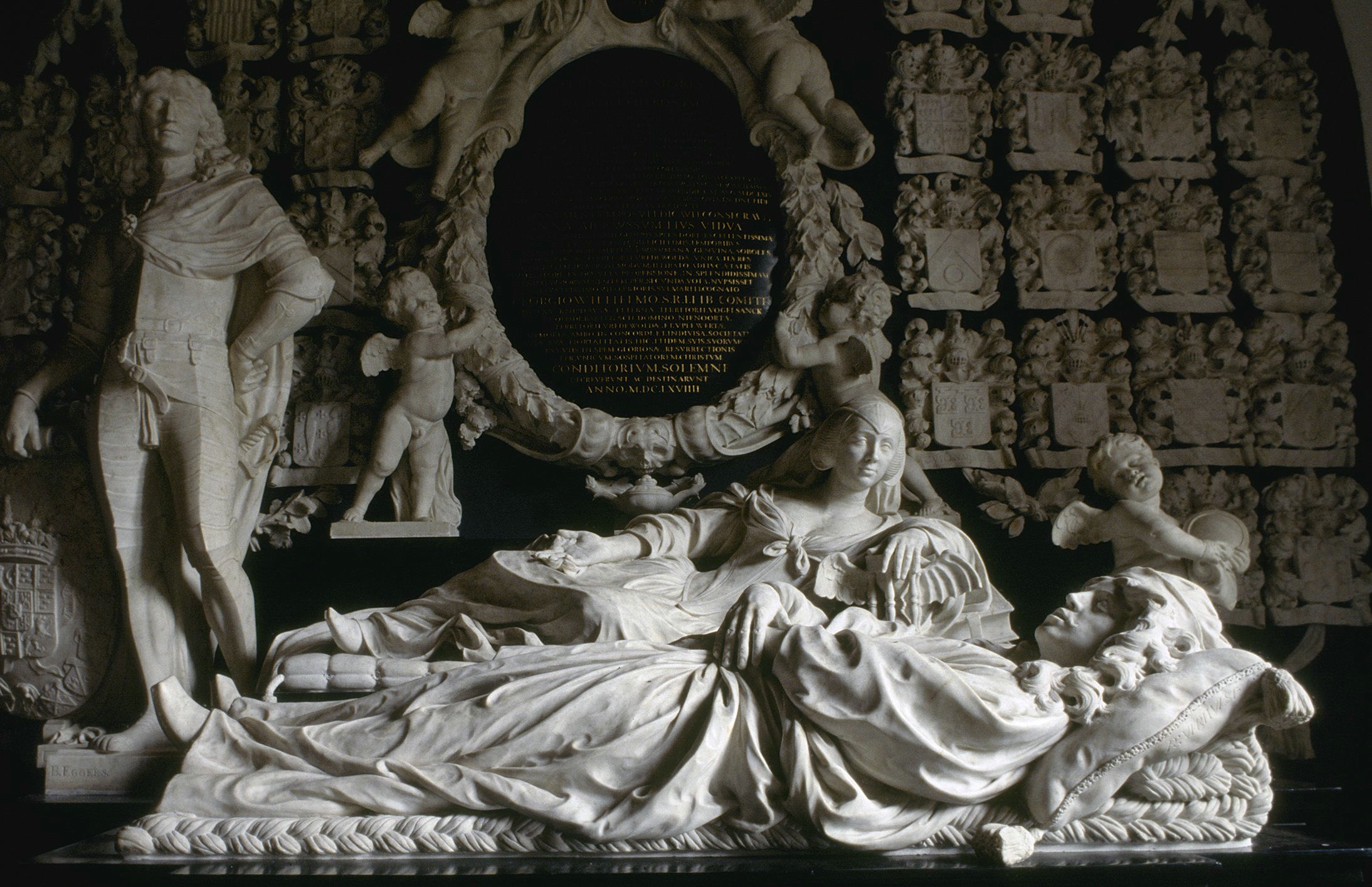
Tomb of Van In- en Kniphuisen by Rombout Verhulst and Bartholomeus Eggers (1665–69), church of Midwolde

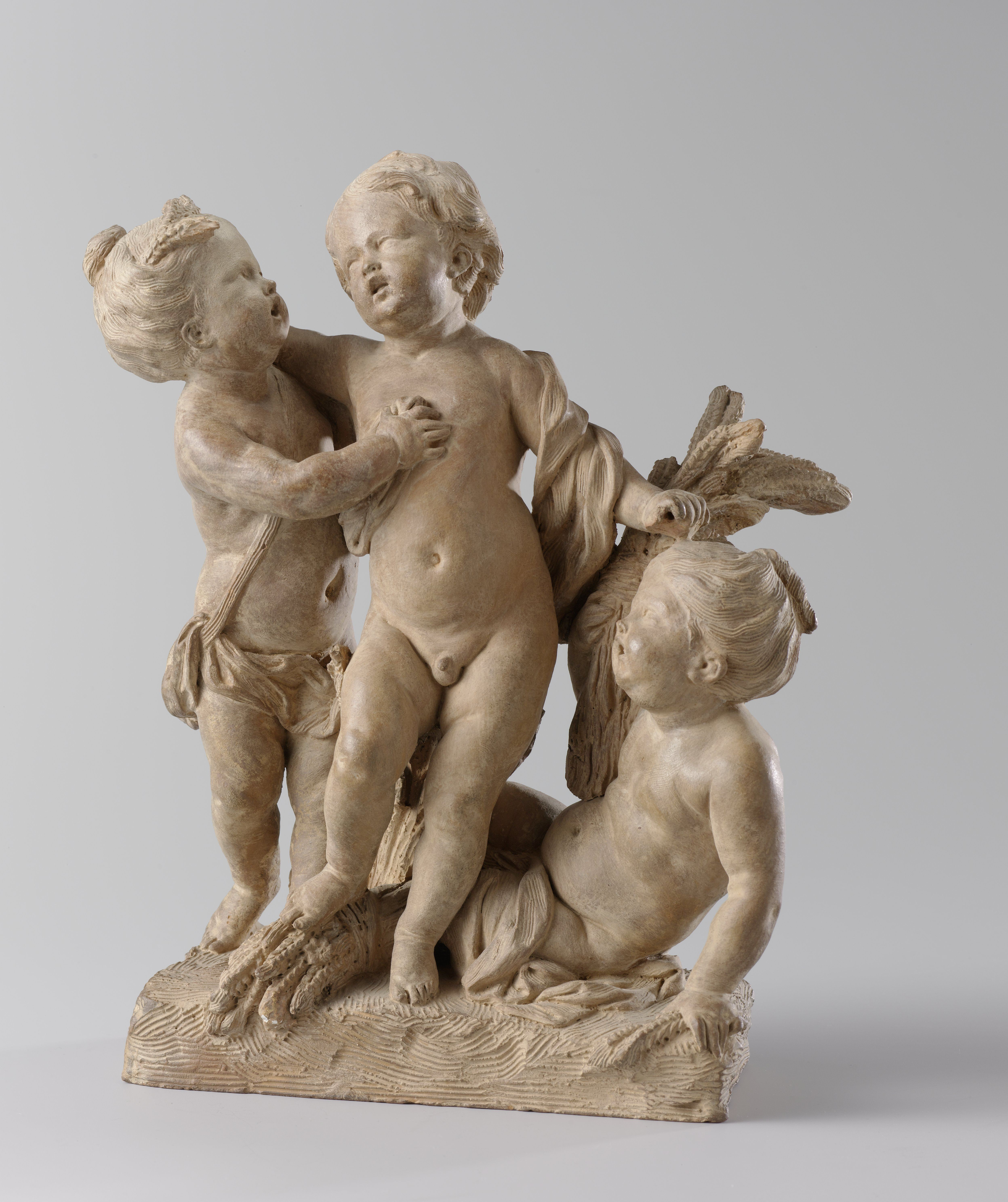
Allegory of summer, by Jan Baptist Xavery (1726), Rijksmuseum Amsterdam

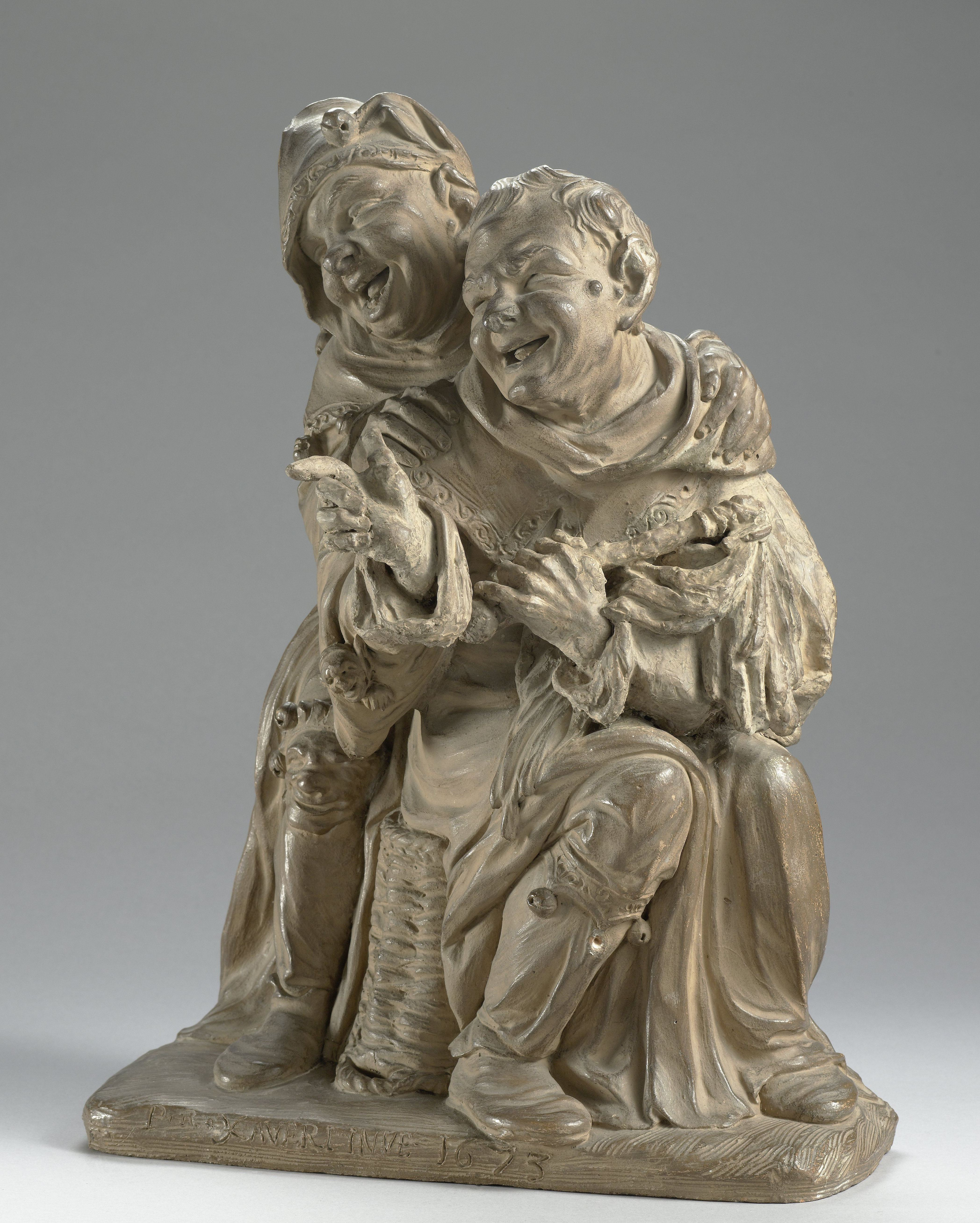
Two laughing fools, by Pieter Xavery (1773), Rijksmuseum Amsterdam

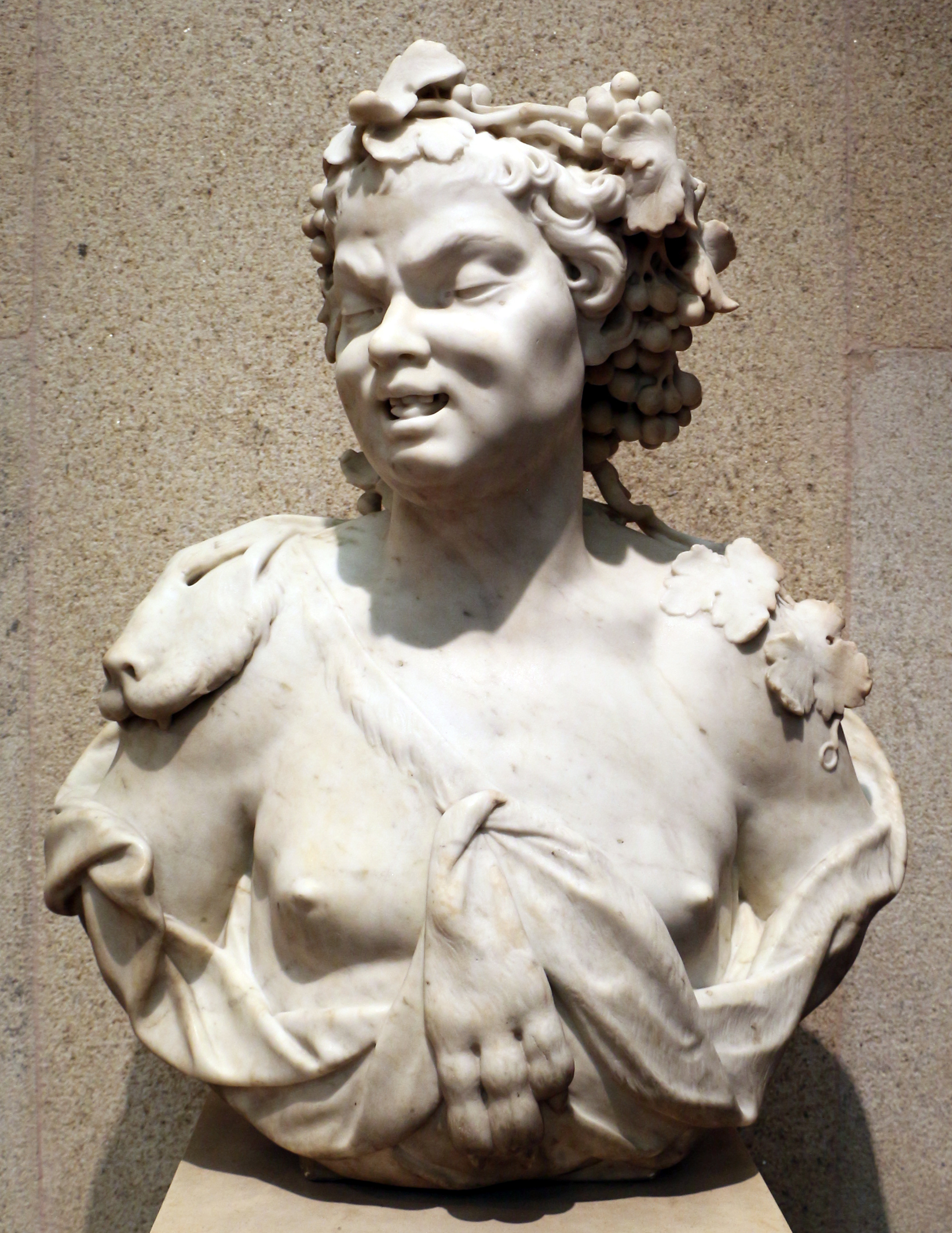
Bacchus, by Jan van Logteren, Calouste Gulbenkian Museum

== England ==
Early Baroque sculpture in England was influenced by an influx of refugees from the Wars of Religion on the continent. One of the first English sculptors to adopt the style was Nicholas Stone (Also known as Nicholas Stone the Elder) (1586–1652). He apprenticed with another English sculptor, Isaak James, and then in 1601 with the noted Dutch sculptor Hendrick de Keyser, who had taken sanctuary in England. Stone returned to Holland with de Keyser, married his daughter, and worked in his studio in the Dutch Republic until he came back to England in 1613. Stone adapted the Baroque style of funeral monuments, for which de Keyser was known, particularly in the tomb of Lady Elizabeth Carey (1617–18) and the tomb of Sir William Curle (1617). Like the Dutch sculptors, he also adapted the use of contrasting black and white marble in the funeral monuments, carefully detailed drapery, and made faces and a hands with a remarkable naturalism and realism. At the same time that he worked as a sculptor, he also collaborated as an architect with Inigo Jones.

In the second half of the 18th century, the Anglo-Dutch sculptor and wood carver Grinling Gibbons (1648 – 1721), who had likely trained in the Dutch Republic created important Baroque sculptures in England, including in Windsor Castle and Hampton Court Palace, St. Paul's Cathedral and other London churches. Most of his work consists of decorative Baroque garlands executed in lime (Tilia) wood. England did not have a homegrown sculpture school that could supply the demand for monumental tombs, portrait sculpture and monuments to it luminaries (the so-called English worthies). As a result sculptors from the continent played an important role in the development of Baroque sculpture in England. Various Flemish sculptors were active in England from the second half of the 17th century, including Artus Quellinus III, Antoon Verhuke, John Nost, Peter van Dievoet and Laurens van der Meulen. These Flemish artists often collaborated with local artists such as Gibbons. An example is the equestrian statue of Charles II for which Quellinus likely carved the relief panels for the marble pedestal, after designs by Gibbons.

In the 18th century, the Baroque style would be continued by a new influx of continental artists, including the Flemish sculptors Peter Scheemakers, Laurent Delvaux and John Michael Rysbrack and the Frenchman Louis François Roubiliac (1707–1767). Rysbrack was one of the foremost sculptors of monuments, architectural decorations and portraits in the first half of the 18th century. His style combined the Flemish Baroque with Classical influences. He operated an important workshop whose output left an important imprint on the practice of sculpture in England. Roubiliac arrived in London c. 1730, after training under Balthasar Permoser in Dresden and Nicolas Coustou in Paris. He gained a reputation as a portrait sculptor and later also worked on tomb monuments. His most famous works included a bust of the composer Handel, made during Handel's lifetime for the patron of the Vauxhall Gardens and the tomb of Joseph and Lady Elizabeth Nightengale (1760). Lady Elizabeth had died tragically of a false childbirth provoked by a stroke of lightning in 1731, and the funeral monument captured with great realism the pathos of her death. His sculptures and busts depicted his subjects as they were. They were dressed in ordinary clothing and given natural postures and expressions, without pretentions of heroism. His portrait busts show a great vivacity and were thus different from the broader treatment by Rysbrack.

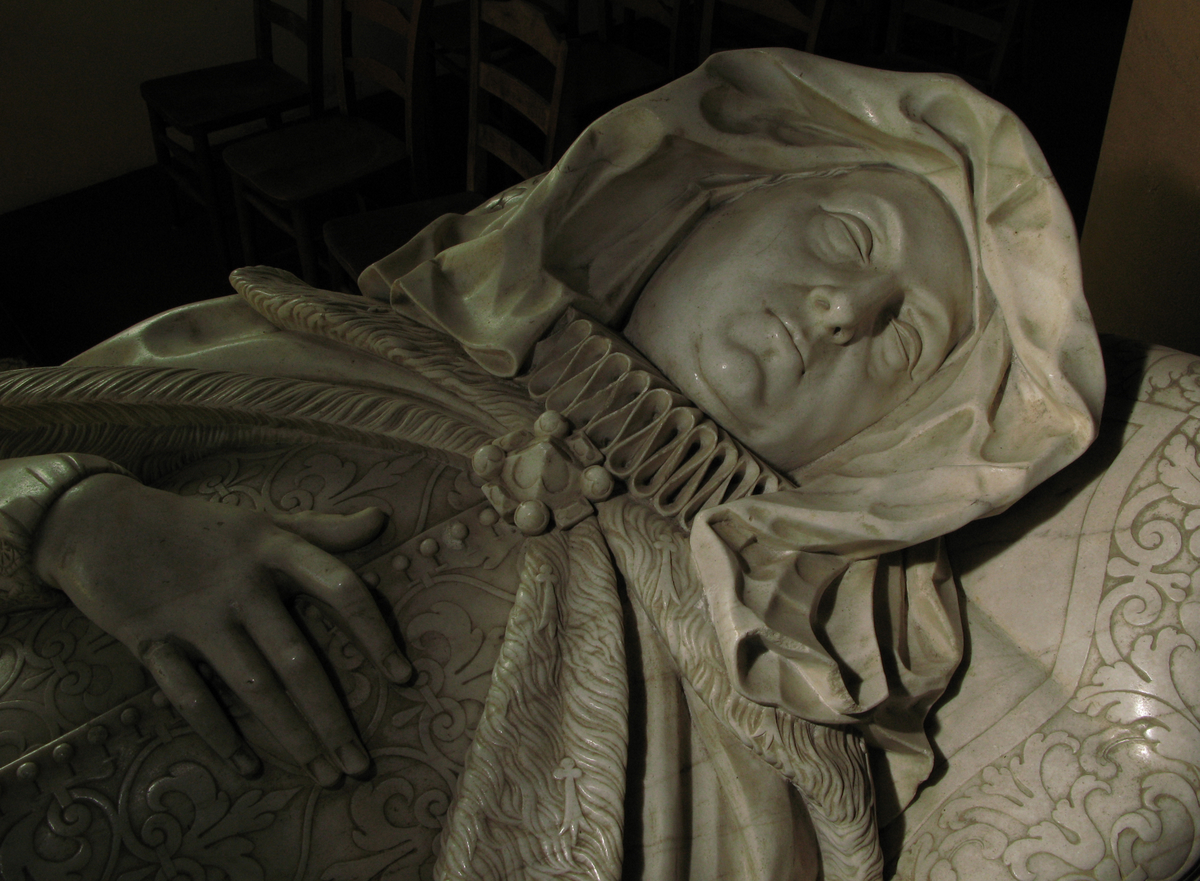
Tomb of Lady Elizabeth Carey by Nicholas Stone (1617-1618), Stowe Nine Churches, Northamptonshire

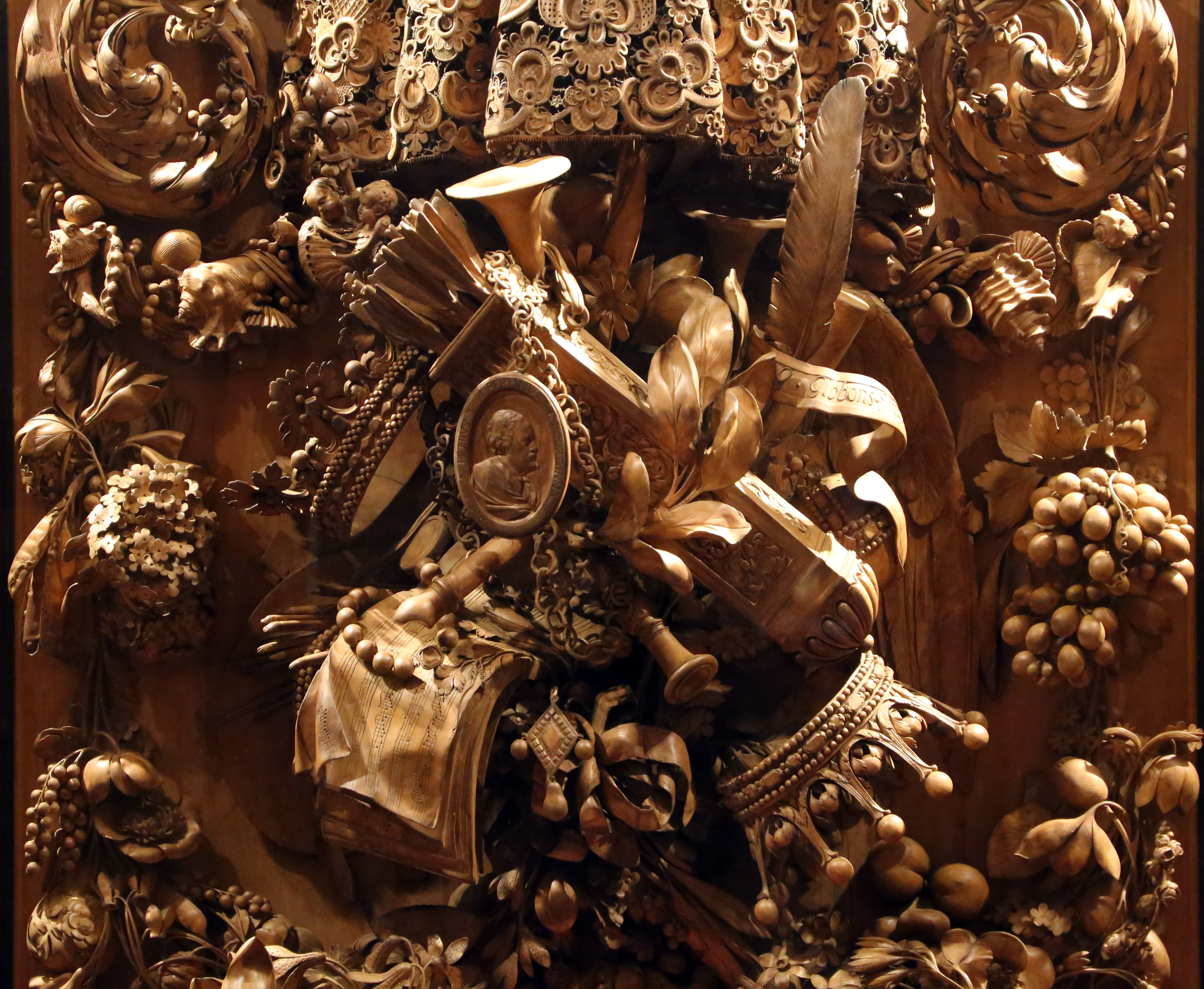
Panel in honor of the alliance between Tuscany and England, by Grinling Gibbons (1680–82)

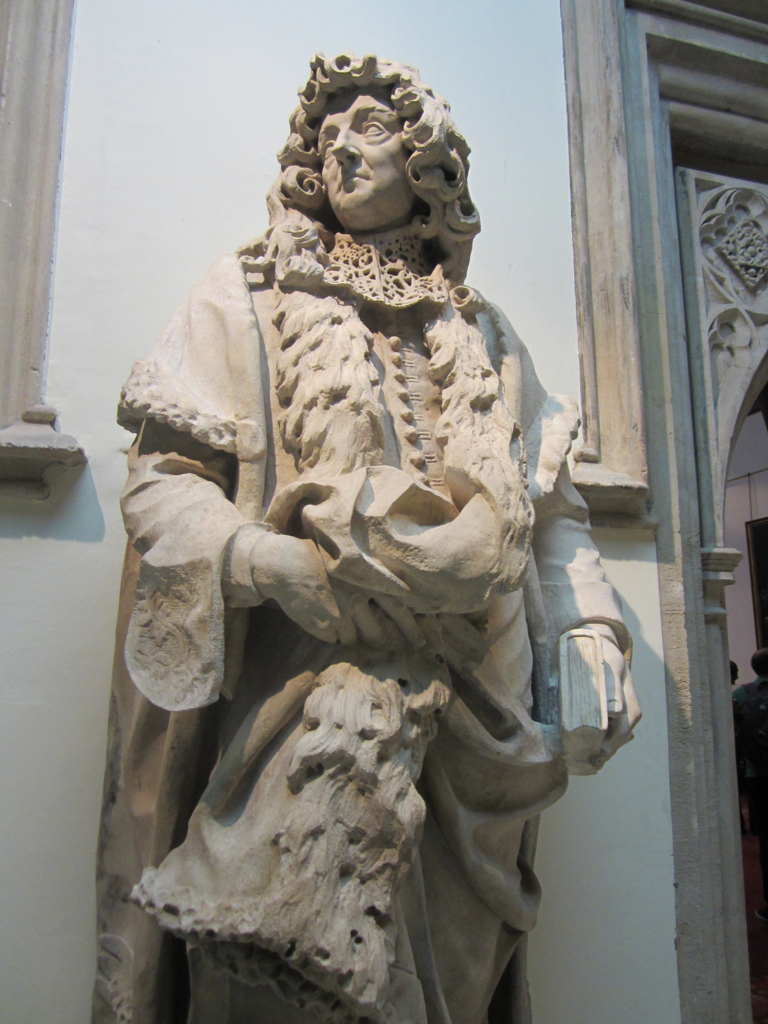
Sir John Cutler by Artus Quellinus III, (c. 1683) Guildhall

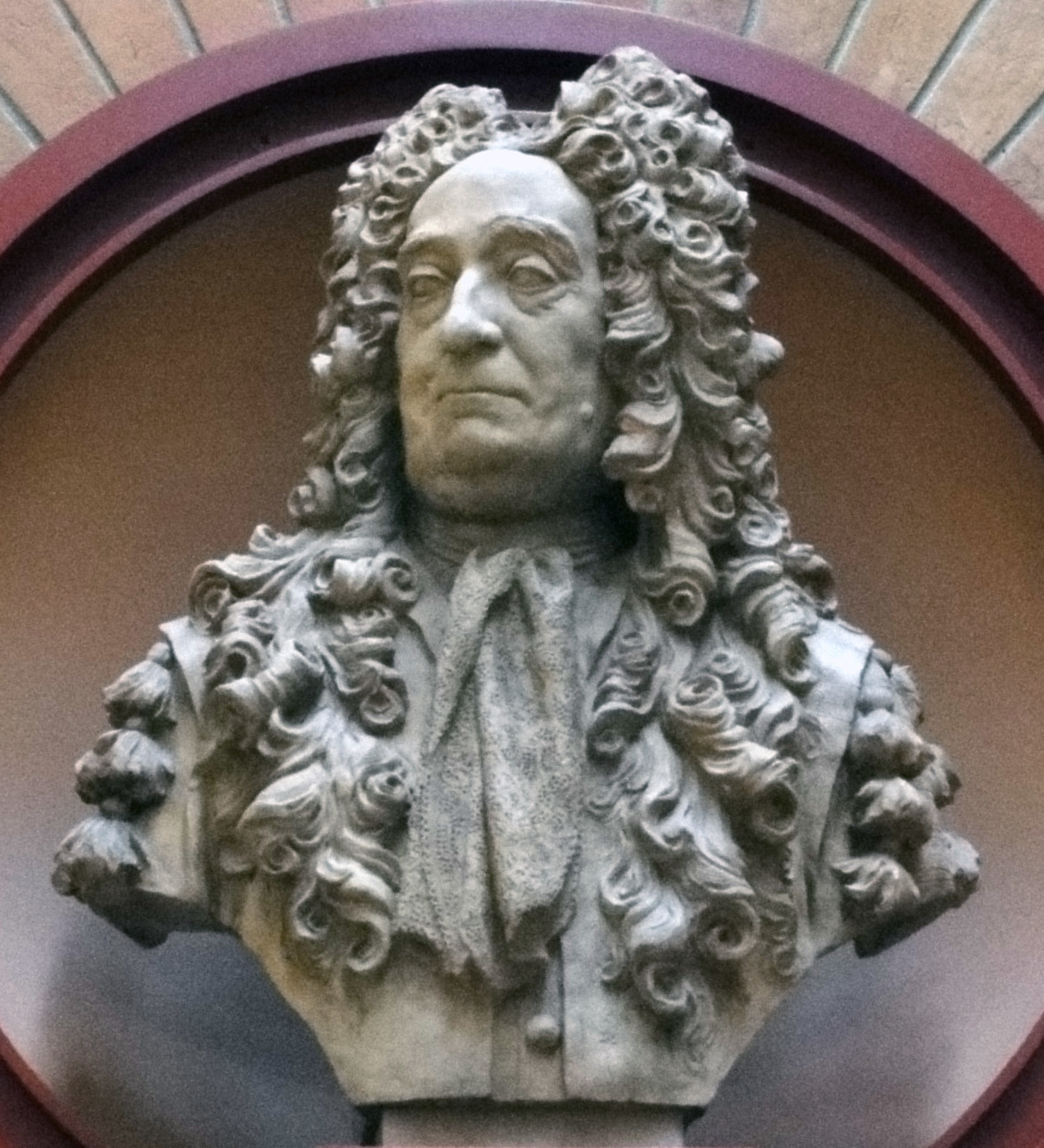
Bust of Hans Sloane by John Michael Rysbrack, (1753) British Museum

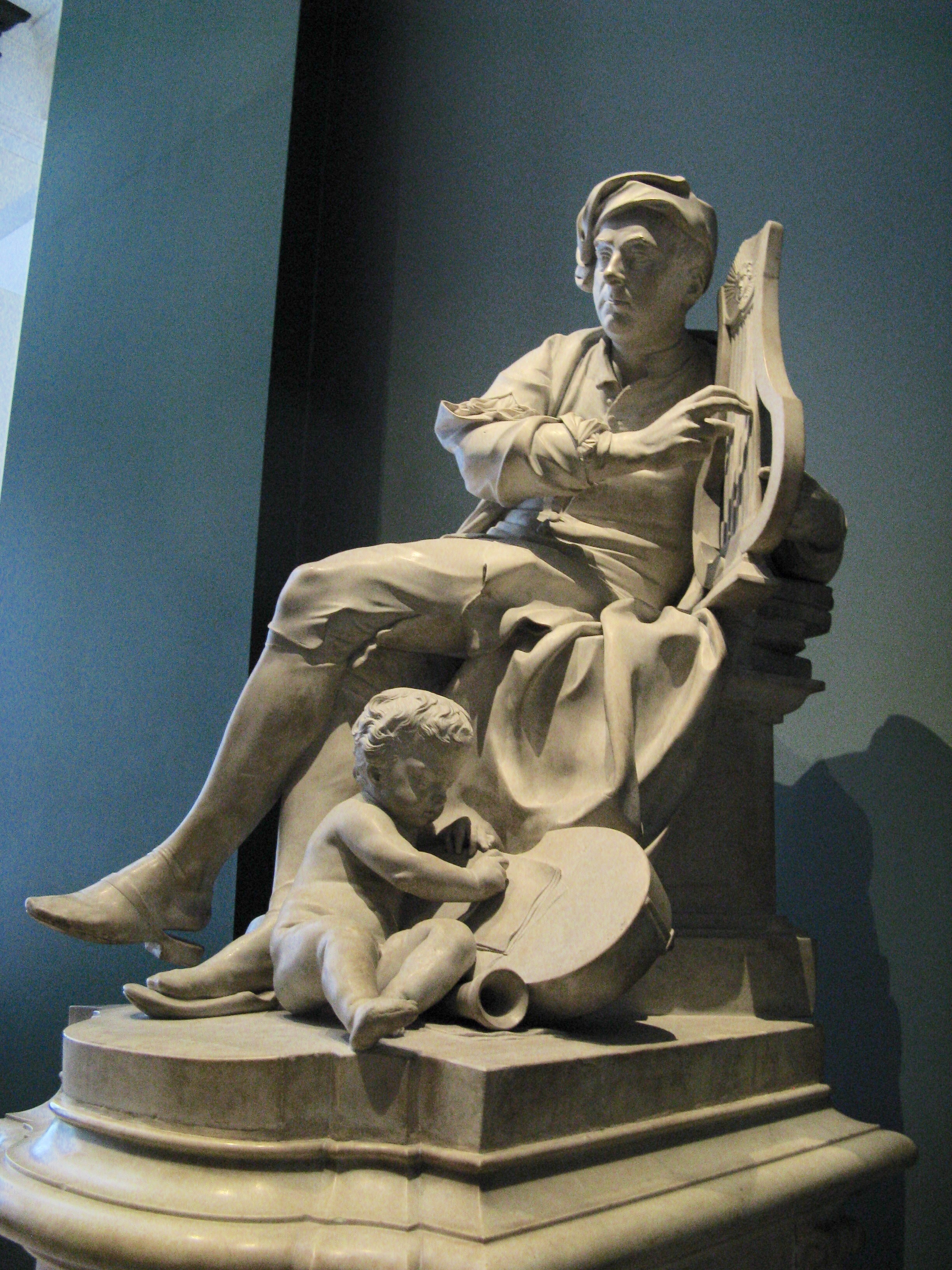
Handel by Louis-François Roubiliac, (1738) Victoria and Albert Museum

== Germany and the Habsburg Empire ==
The Baroque movement flourished especially in the end of the 17th century and the beginning of the 18th century in Germany and the states of the Habsburg Empire governed from Vienna. A large number of churches and statues had been destroyed by the Protestant iconoclasts during the Reformation and the Wars of Religion, and large numbers of new works were made to replace them. Many of the new works expressed triumphal themes; Hercules slaying a lion, Saint Michael slaying a dragon, and other subjects which represented the triumph of the Catholic church over th Protestants.

A number of sculptors came from the Netherlands to participate in the reconstruction. They included Hubert Gerhard (1550–1622) from Amsterdam, a student of Giambologna, who was commissioned by the German banker Hans Fugger to make a monumental fountain for his castle at Kirchheim. This was the first Italian Baroque style fountain made north of Alps. Gerhard was soon commissioned to make an Italian-Baroque style fountain for the town square in Augsburg, and a statue of St. Michael slaying a dragon for the prince's residence in Munich. The sculptors Hans Krumper (1570–1634), Hans Reichle (1570–1624) and the Dutch-born Adrien de Vries (1545–1626) made similar monumental bronze fountains and statues, full of action and drama, for church facades and town squares in Bavaria.

One of the most unusual German sculptors in the late Baroque was Franz Xaver Messerschmidt, who was known both for religious sculpture and for a series of sculpted portraits portraying extreme expressions.

Balthasar Permoser (1651–1732) spent fourteen years in Italy, from 1675 to 1689, before becoming court sculptor in Dresden. He worked in Venice, Rome and Florence, and brought the Italian Baroque to Dresden, particularly in the gardens, and the interior decoration of the Zwinger Palace. His most famous work was a sculpture of The Apotheosis of Prince Eugene of Savoy, the general who had defeated the invasion of the Ottoman Turks. The Prince is portrayed with his foot on a defeated Turk, and with the attributes of Hercules. His sculpted pulpit for the Hofkirche in Dresden is another masterpiece of Baroque sculpture.

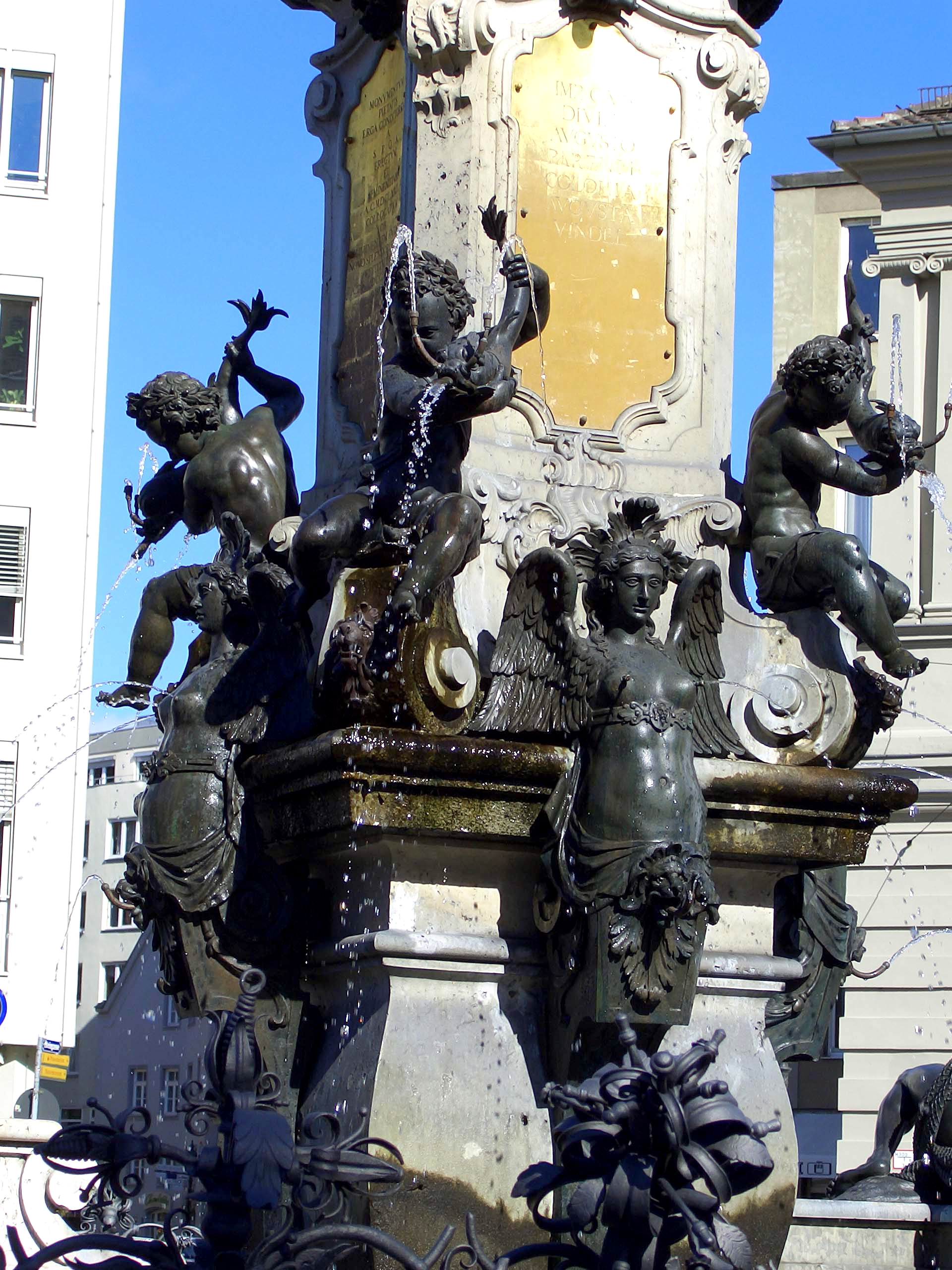
Hubert Gerhard, Fountain of Augustus in Augsburg, 1589-1594)

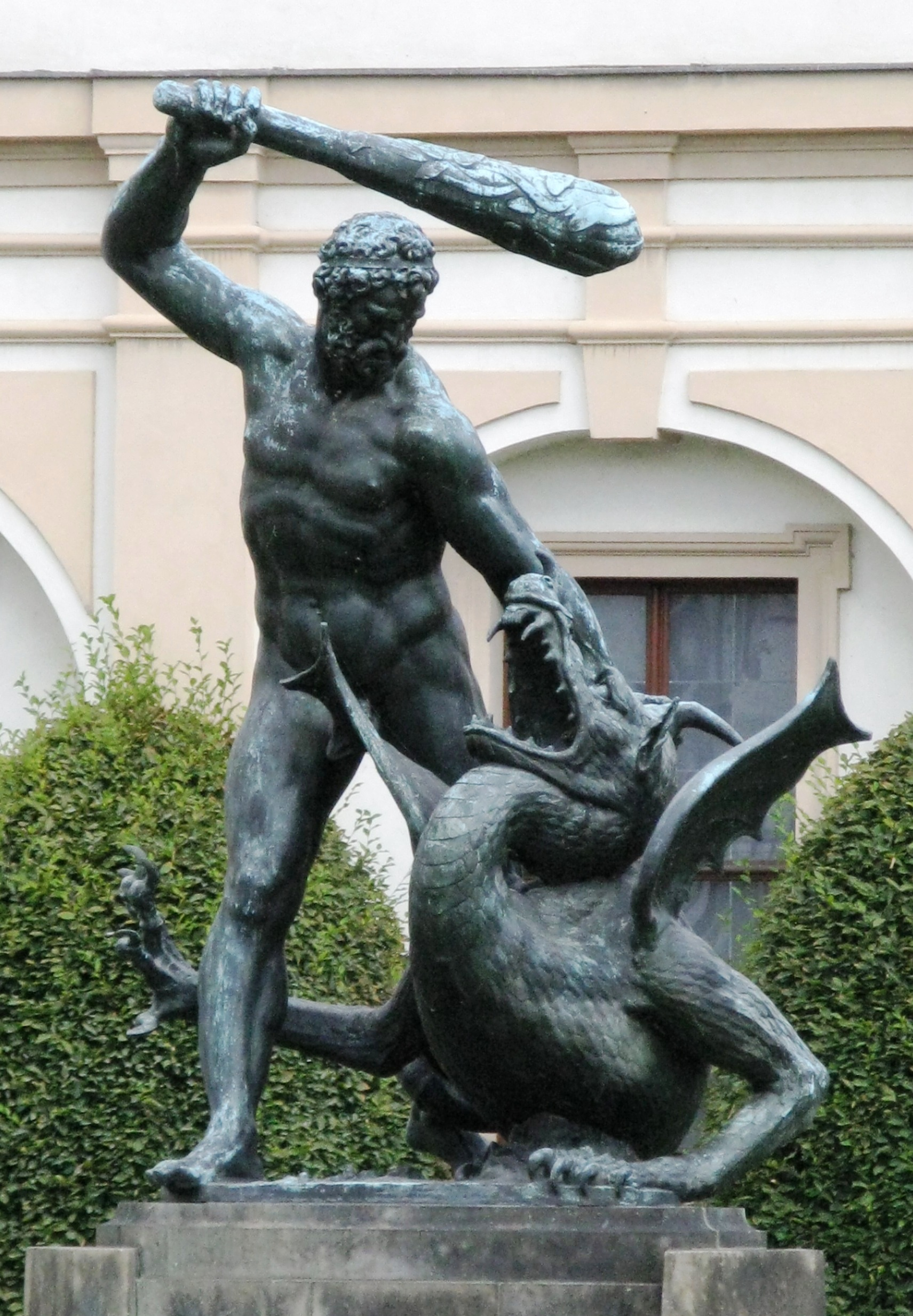
Adriaen de Vries, Hercules slays a dragon (now at Waldstein Palace, Prague)

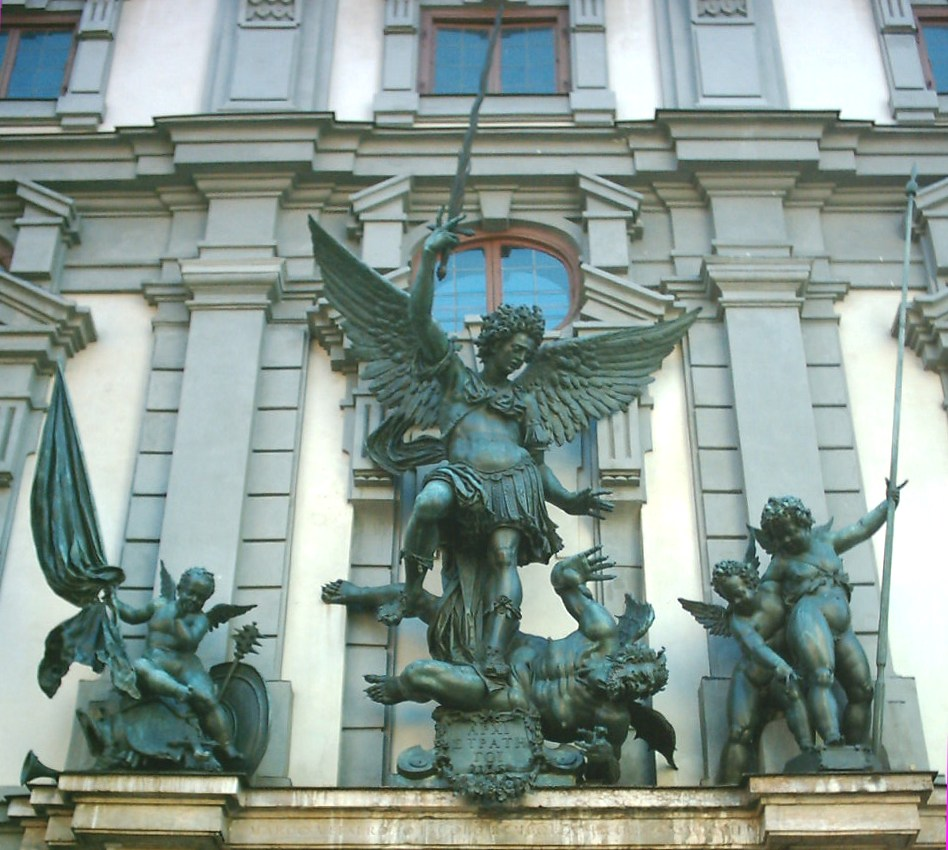
Fountain of the Archangel Michael by Hans Reichle in Augsburg (1603-1606)

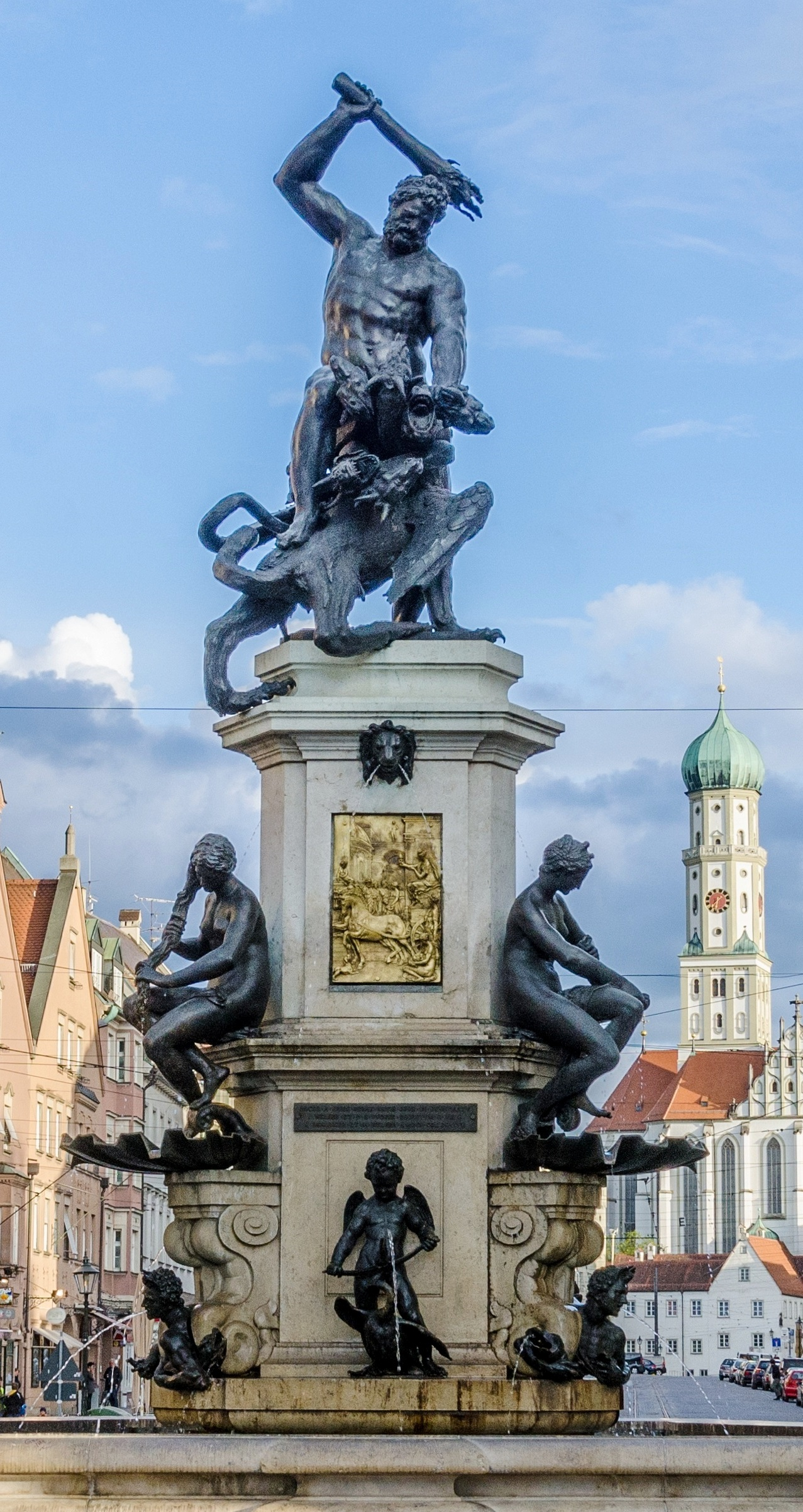
The Hercules Fountain in Augsbourg by Adriaen de Vries (1596-1602)

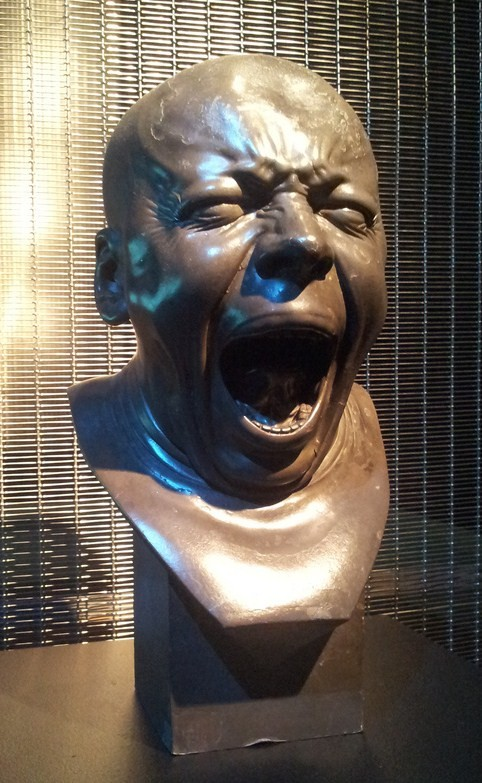
Yawning by Franz Xaver Messerschmidt (circa 1770)

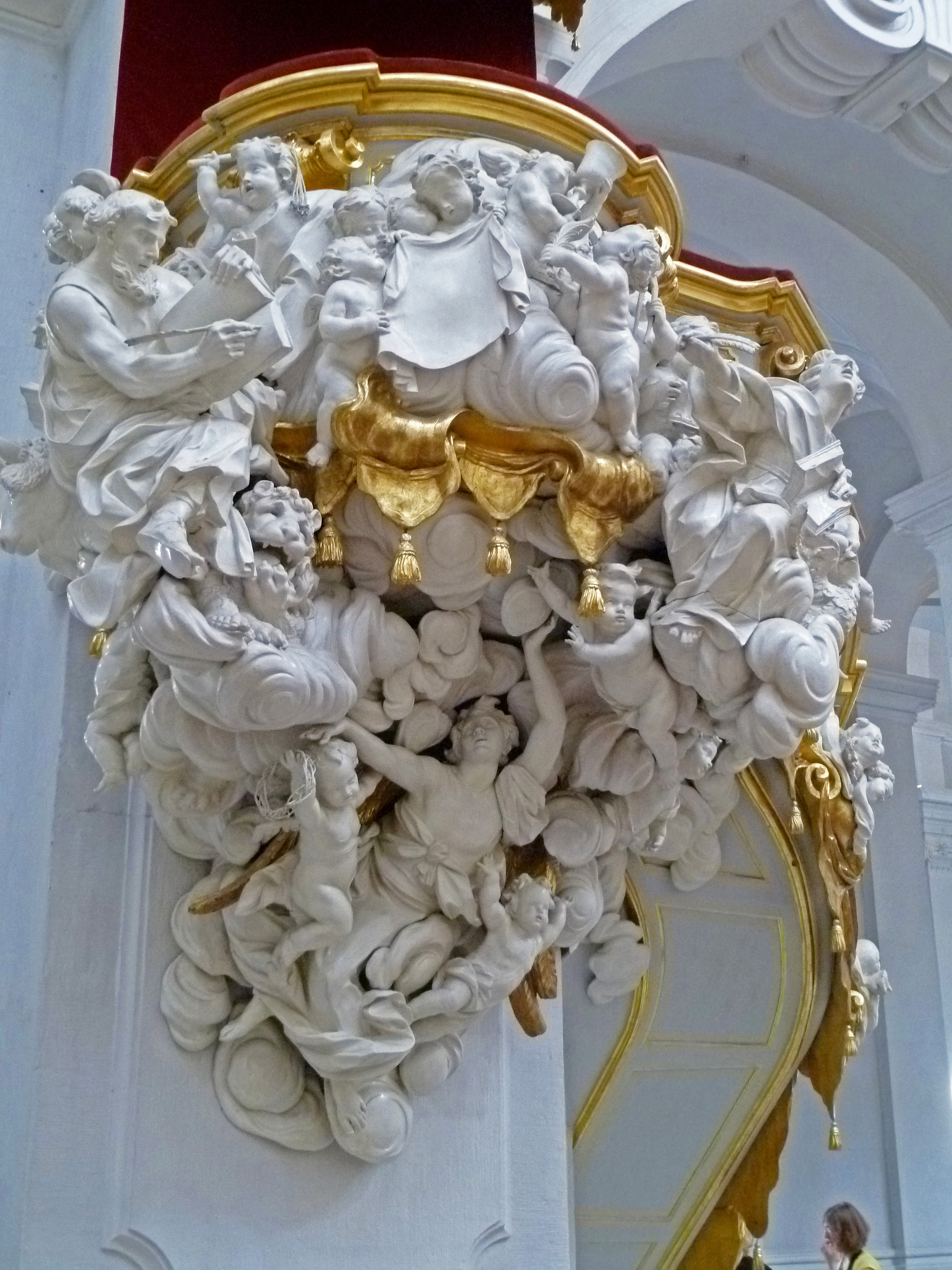
Pulpit of the Hofkirche in Dresden, by Balthasar Permoser

The most dramatic theater for Baroque sculpture in Germany was church architecture. Particularly complex retables and high altars. crowded with statues and rising almost the ceilings, were created by Hans Riechle, Jorg Zurn, Hans Degler, and other artists. The Michael Zürn family produced several generations of very productive sculptors, making figures of polychrome or gilded wood and stucco. Other artists producing remarkable retables included Thomas Schwanthaler.

In Vienna, the later years of the 18th century produced some extraordinary works, that marked the transition from Baroque into Rococo. These included the Fall of the Angels in Saint Michael's Church in Vienna, by Karl Georg Merville.

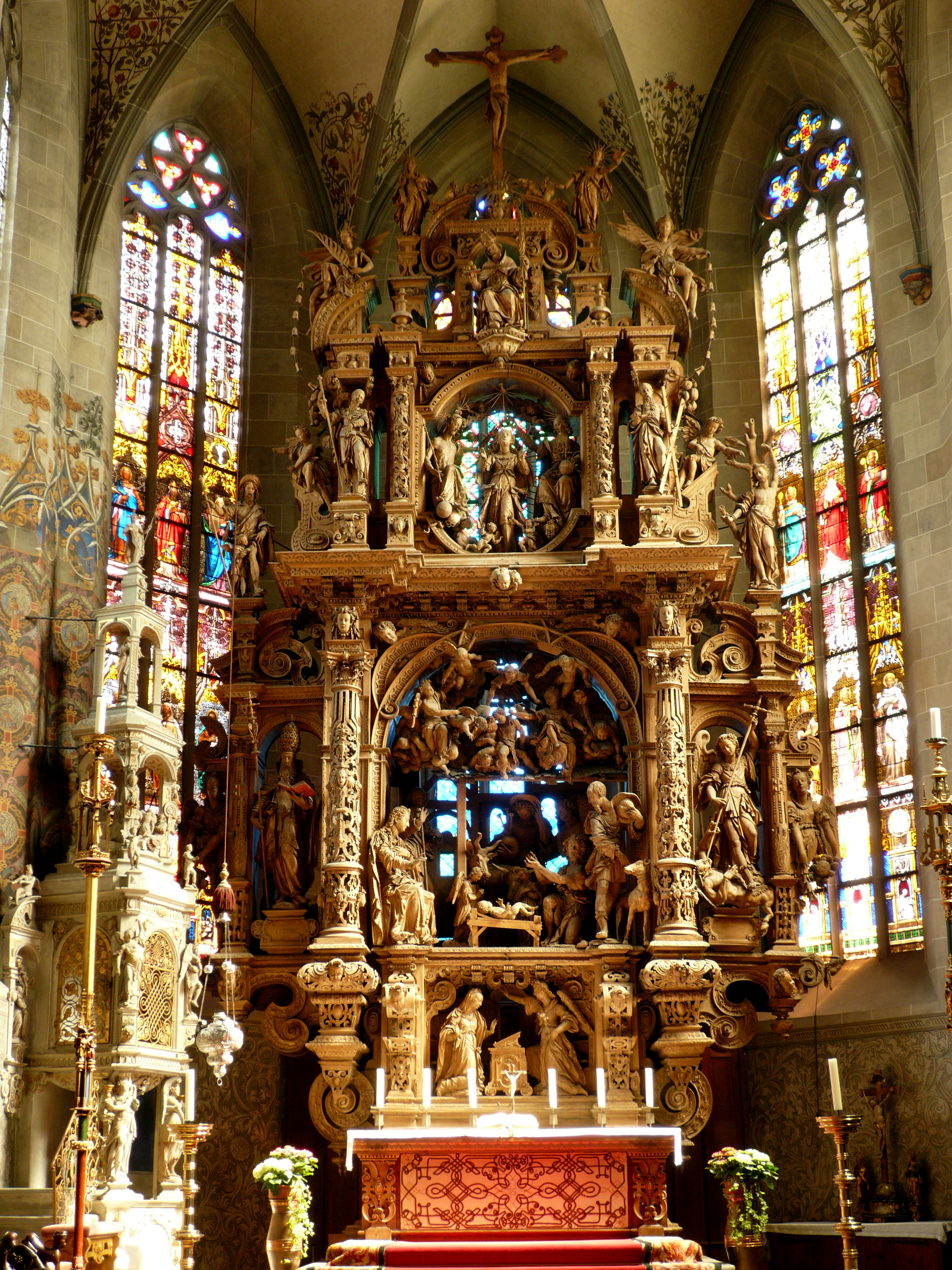
High Altar at Ueberlingen, by Jorg Zurn (about 1613)

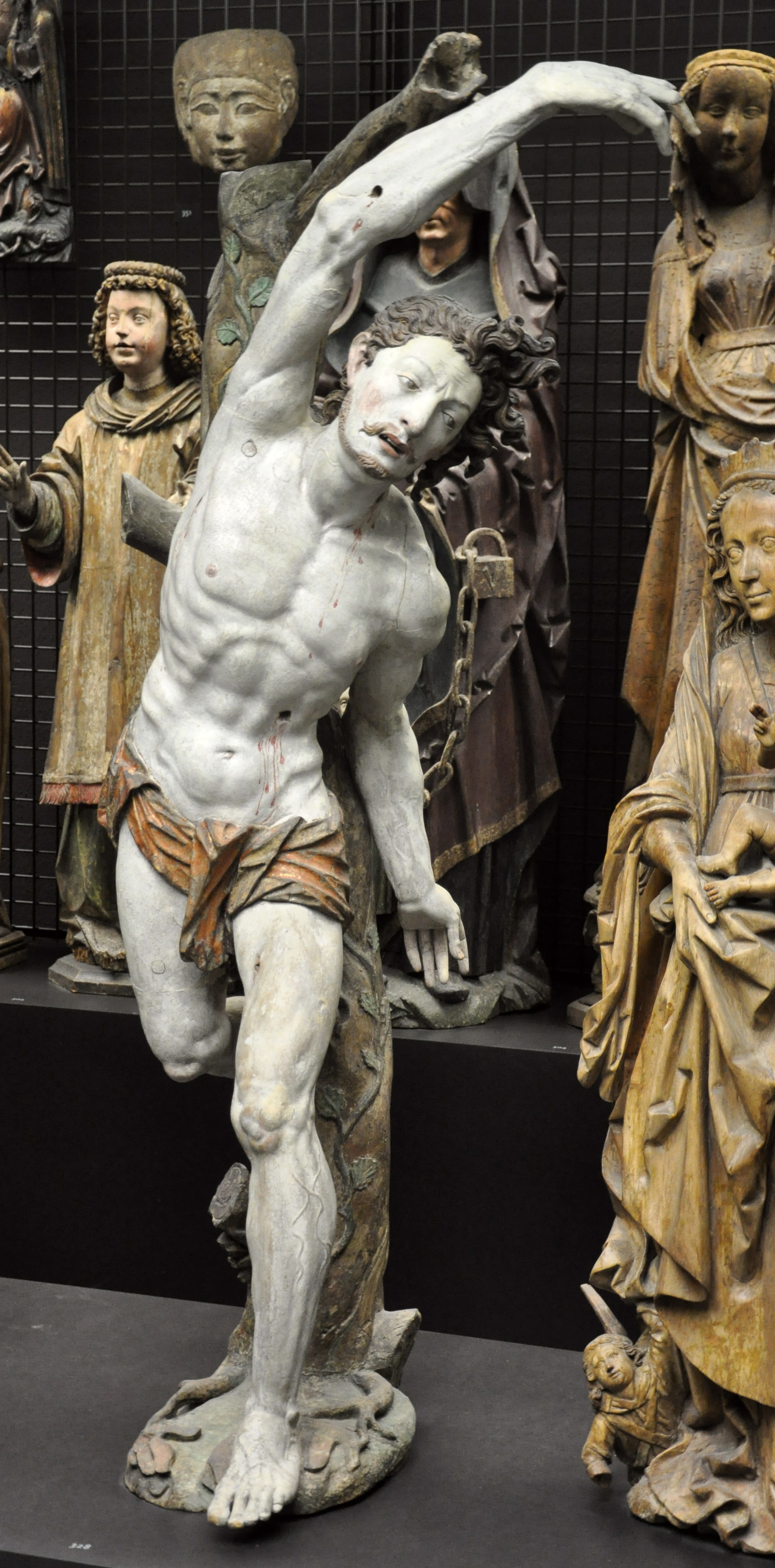
Saint Sebastian, by Michael Zürn

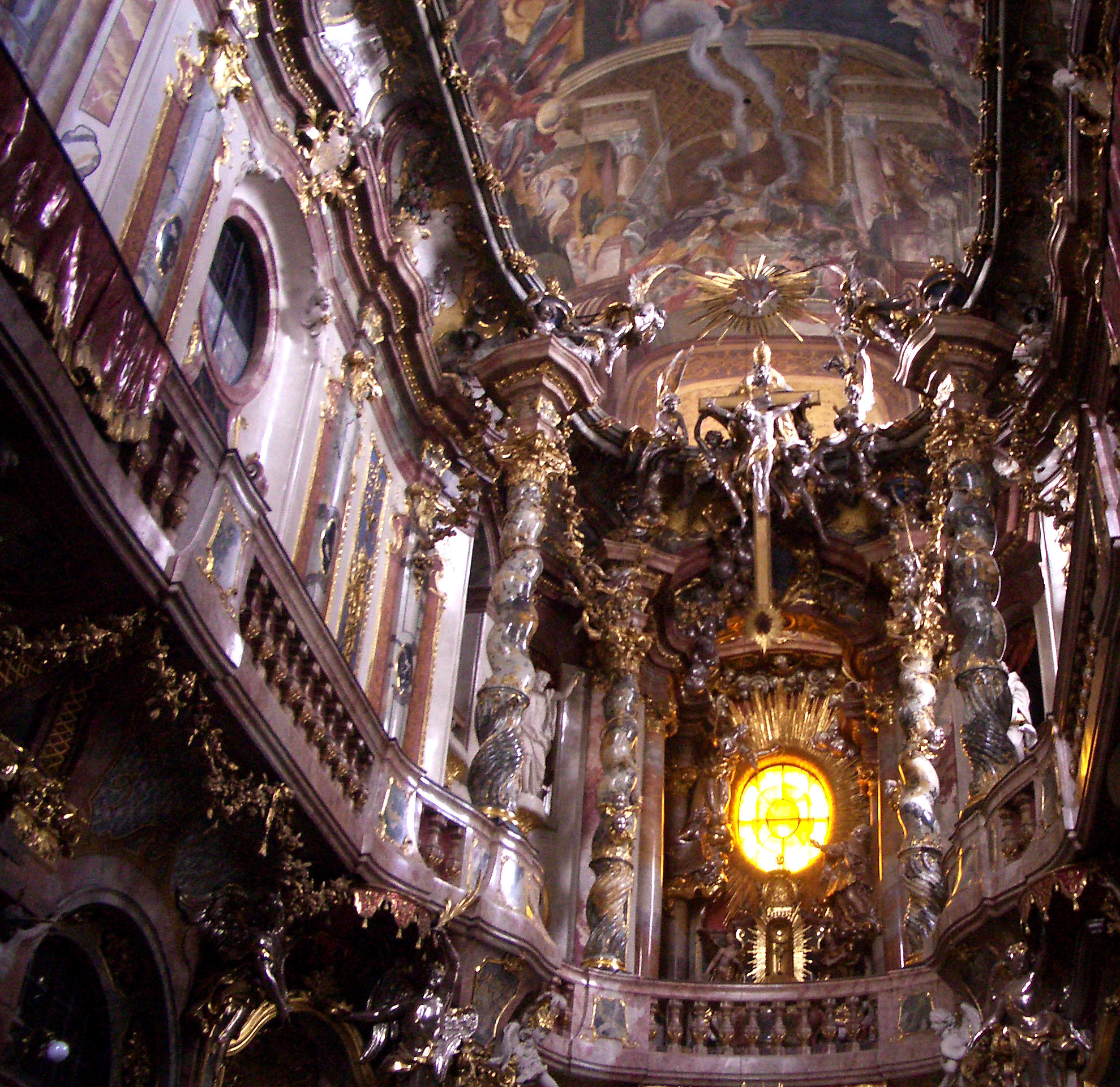
Interior of the Asamkirche in Munich, by Egid Quirin Asam, with sculpture blended into the architecture

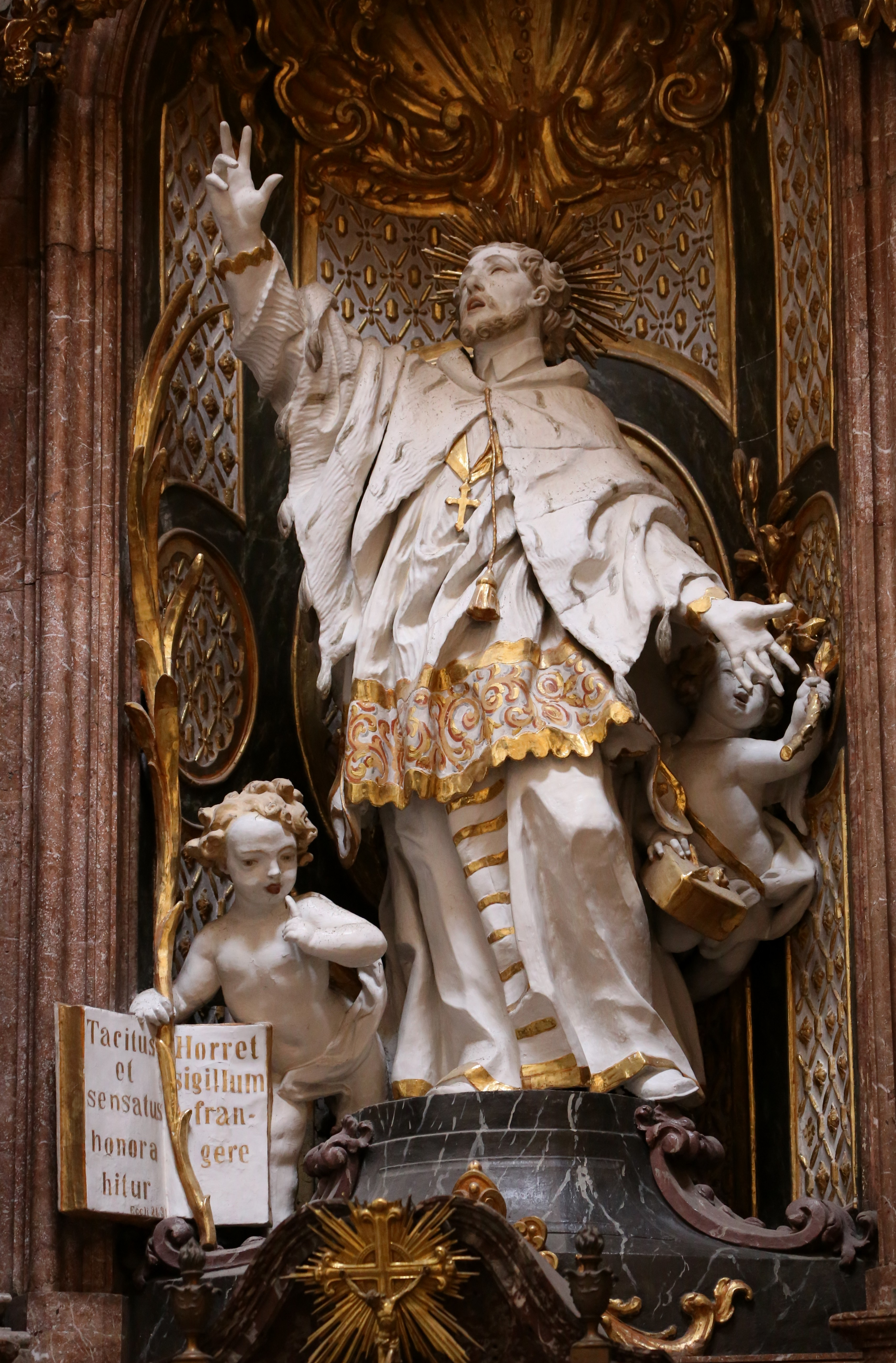
Friesing Chapel by Egid Quirin Asam

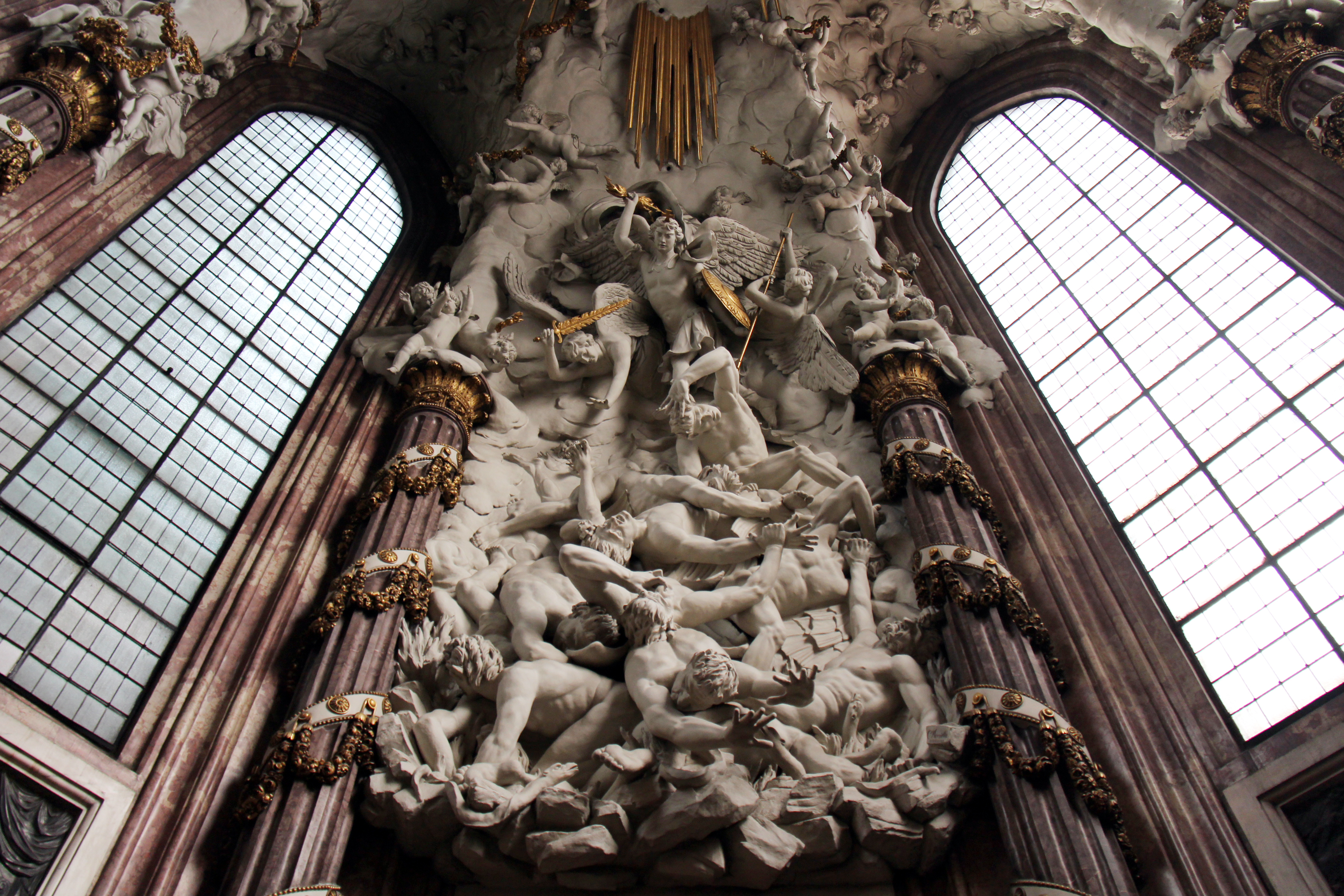
The Fall of the Angels, in St. Michaels's Church, Vienna, by Karl Georg Merville (1781)

== Spain ==
The emergence of the Baroque style in Spain, as in Italy, was largely driven by the Catholic Church, which used it during the Counter-Reformation as a powerful weapon against the Protestants. The great majority of works were made for tombs, altars and chapels. At the same time, the 17th century was a period of economic decline and political and cultural isolation; few Spanish artists traveled abroad, and only a handful of northern European sculptors, notably the Flemish artist José de Arce, came to Spain. As a result, the Spanish Baroque developed independently of the rest of Europe, and had its own specific characteristics.

The crowning of the French Philip V the grandson of Louis XIV, as King of Spain, and the debut Bourbon Dynasty at the beginning of the 18th century brought a dramatic change in cultural policy, and to the style. Thereafter, commissions for major works of art were controlled by the King, not the church, and the royal Academy of Arts. as in France, determined the subjects, style, and materials. This period continued until about 1770.

Large numbers of sculptures were commissioned for retables, reliquaries and funereal monuments in churches, as well as statuary for religious processions. New themes appeared, particularly works devoted to the cult of the Virgin Mary. The style, designed to popular, inclined toward realism. The materials most commonly used was wood, which was frequently painted in different colors. Beginning in about 1610, one specifically Spanish element of realism appeared; sculptors gave their statues wigs of real hair, used pieces of crystal for teardrops, teeth of real ivory, and skin colors painted with careful realism.

There were two important schools of Spanish sculpture in the early 16th century, that of Castile and that of Andalusia. The emphasis in the Castile school was more on sacrifice and martyrdom, with an abundance vivid suffering. The school of Andalusia generally used greater ornament, and less violence; the infant Christ and the Virgin Mary were more frequent subjects than in Castile. The first center of the Castile style was Valladolid, where King Philip III of Spain resided from 1601 to 1606. The most important artist of the early Castilian school was Gregorio Fernández (1576–1636). His early work showed extraordinary realism and naturalism, showing all the wounds. His Descent from the Cross in Valladolid, highly detailed and realistic, was made to be carried in processions. His success enabled him to create a large workshop with many assistants, and to make very large-scale works, most notably the retable of the Cathedral of Plasencia made between 1625 and 1632, considered one of the high points of Spanish art in the first half of the 17th century.

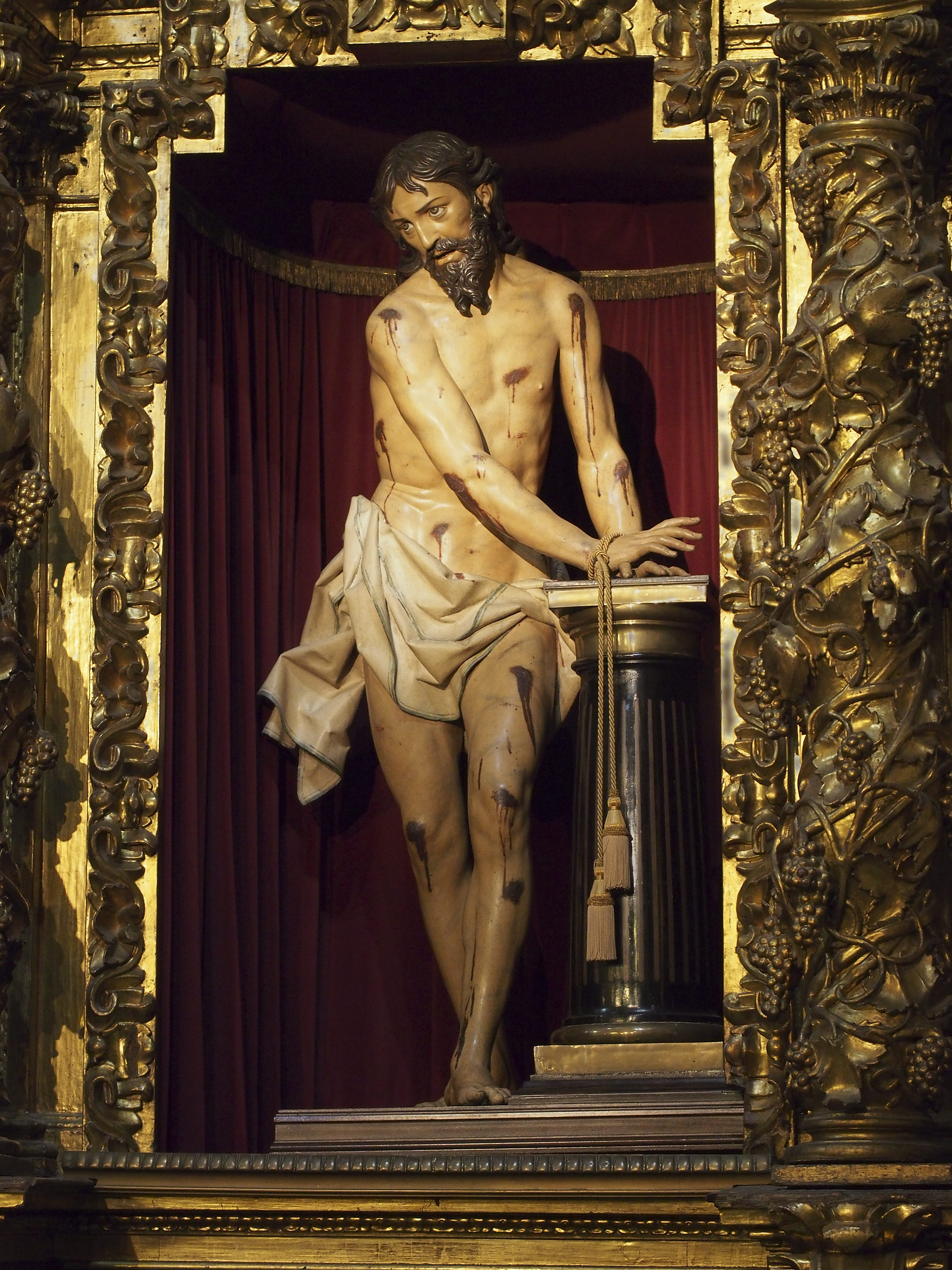
Christ martyred, by Gregorio Fernandez (about 1619), polychrome wood, Valladolid, Vera Cruz

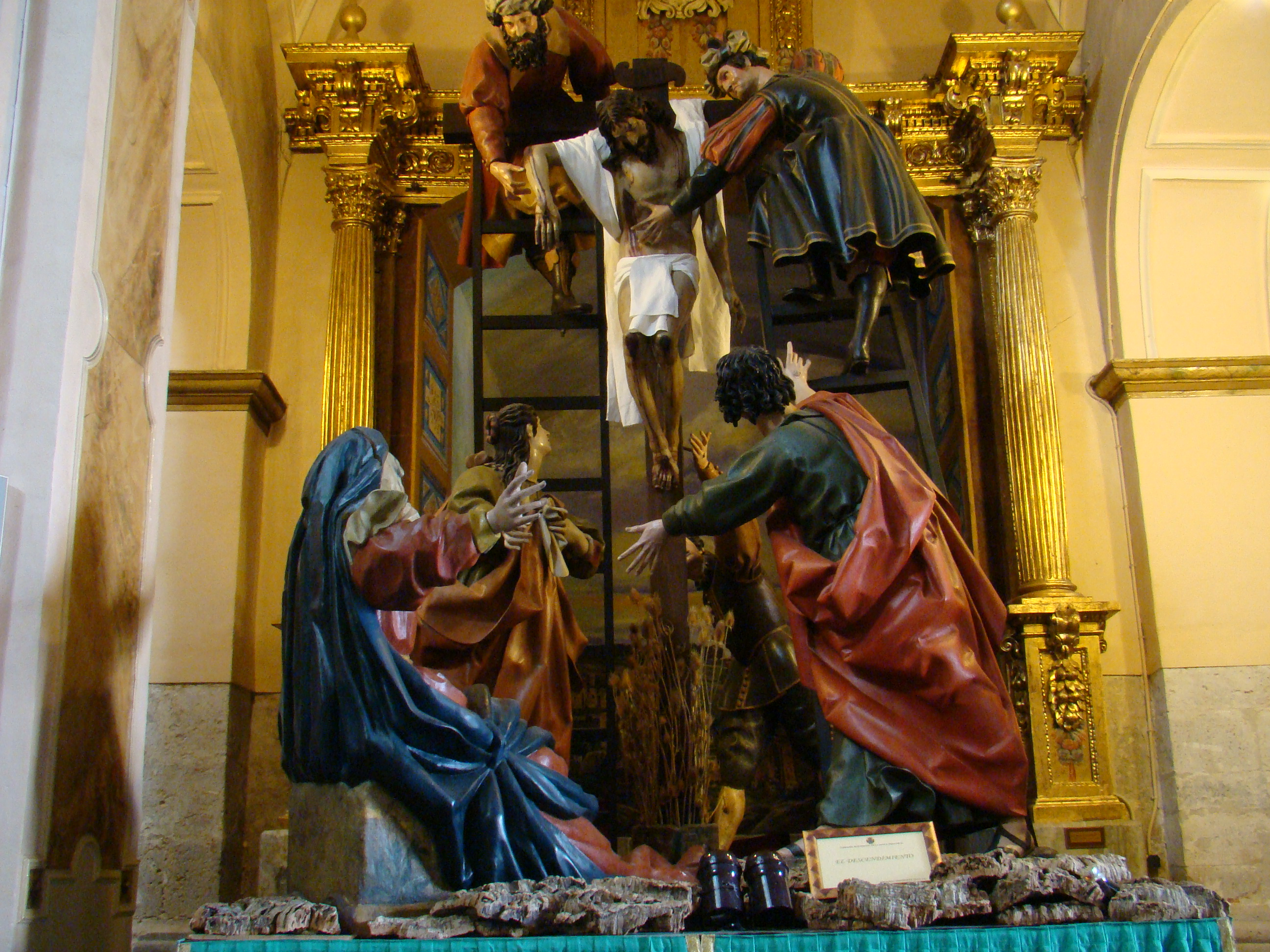
Descent from the Cross by Gregorio Fernandez (1623-1625), polychrome wood, Valladolid

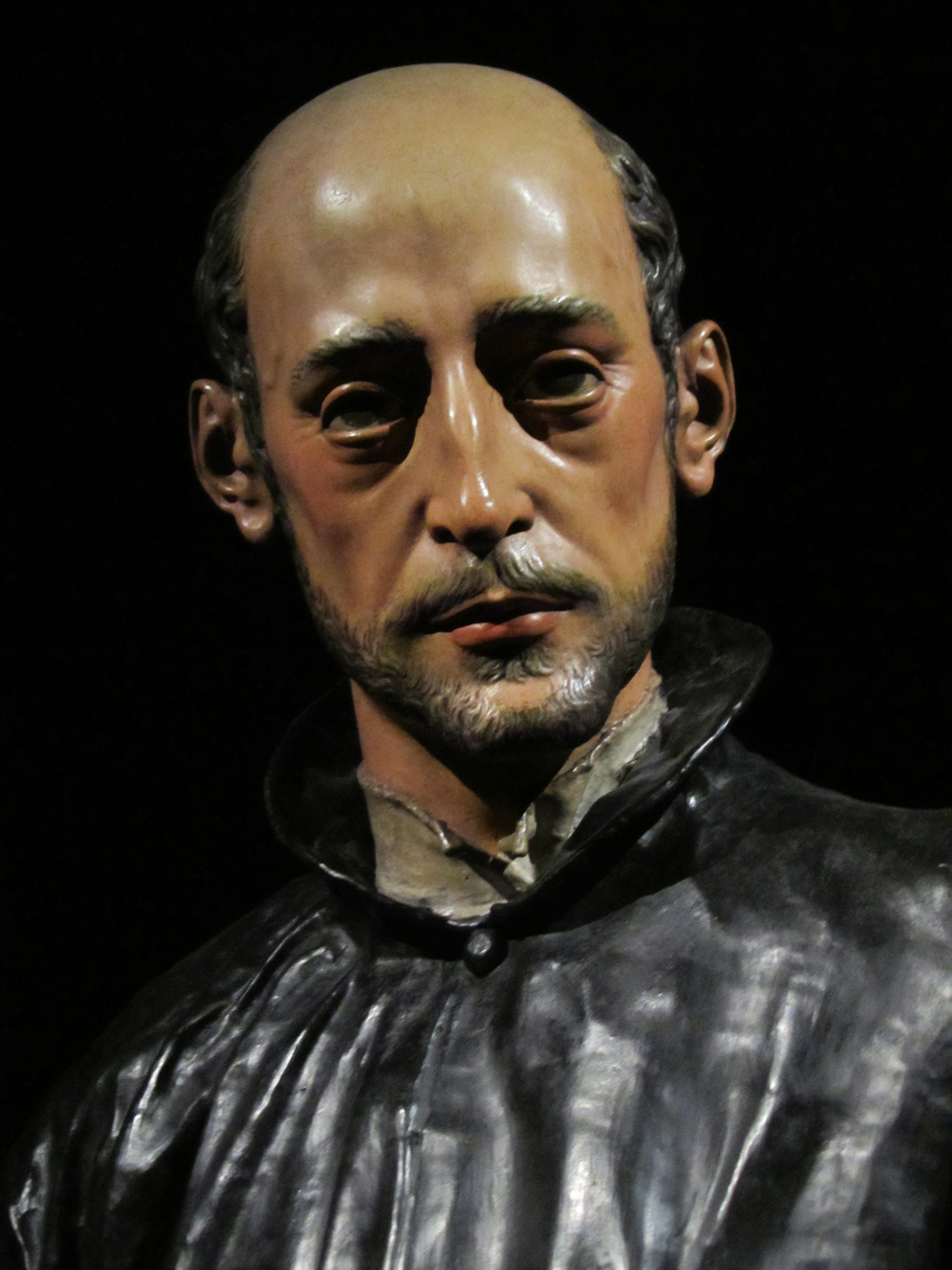
Saint Francis Borgia by Juan Martínez Montañés (1624)

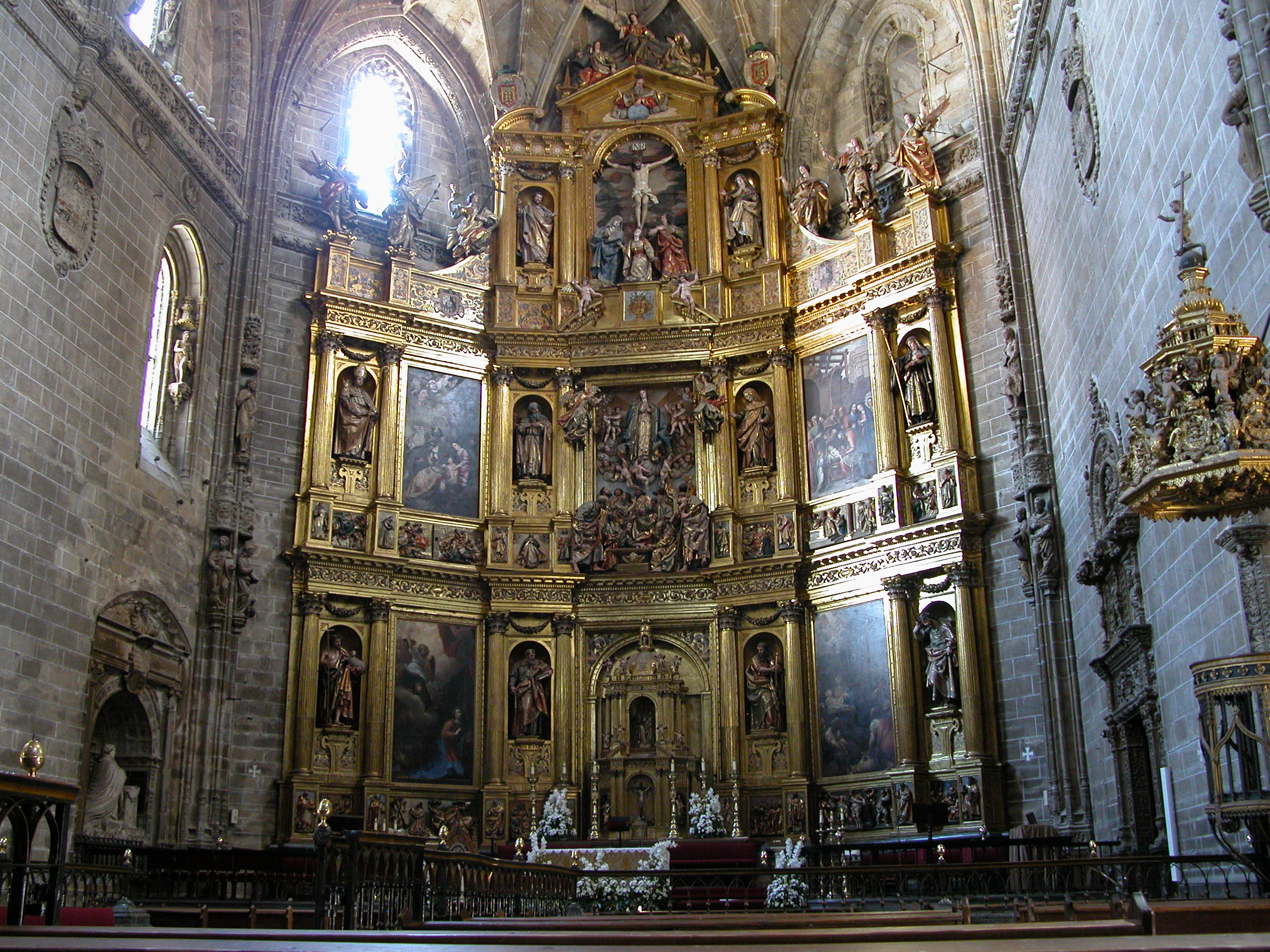
Retable of Plasencia Cathedral, by Gregorio Fernandez (1625–32)

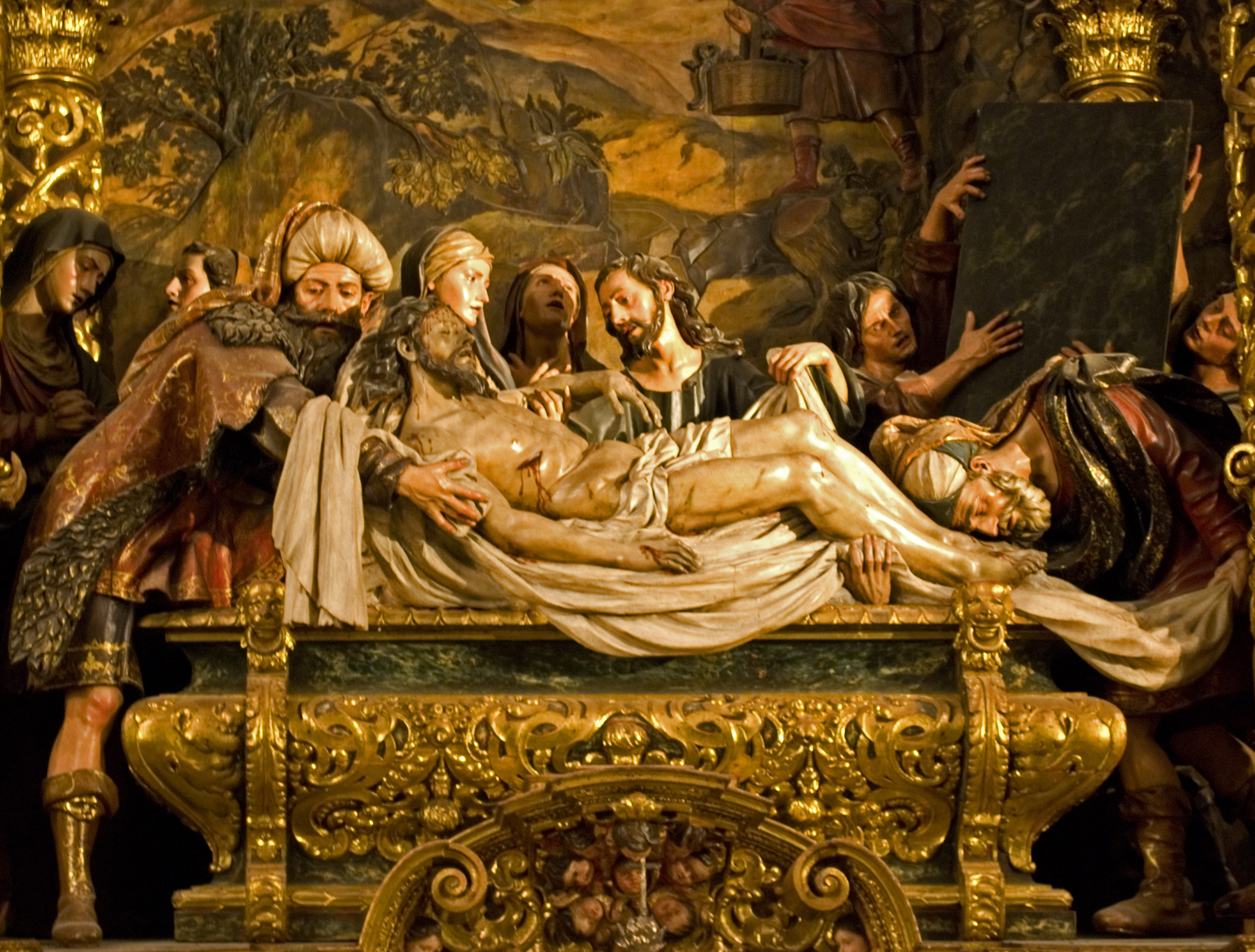
Altar of the Hospital de Caidad in Seville (1670–72) of by Pedro Roldán (1624-1699)

The other early center of Spanish baroque sculpture was the city of Seville, which had been greatly enriched by the wealth of the Spanish colonies in the New World. The most important sculptor of the early Seville school was Juan Martínez Montañés (1568–1649), whose works portrayed balance and harmony, with a minimum of violence and blood. Another important Seville sculptor was Pedro Roldán (1624–1699), whose major work was the lavish retable depicting the descent from the Cross of Christ, made for the Hospital de Caidad in Seville (1670–72). The daughter of Roldán, Luisa Roldán (1654–1704), also achieved fame for her work, and became the first woman appointed a royal sculptor in Spain.

Other notable Spanish Baroque sculptors include Alonso Cano of Granada (1601–1634), who was also active as a painter and sculptor, and whose works featured an idealized naturalism. His pupil, Pedro de Mena (1628–1688), became one of the most important sculptors of the Seville school, with his delicate and realistic life-size statues of Saints.

The early 18th century saw the creation of several lavishly Baroque works, including the altar El Transparente by Narciso Tomé in Toledo, an enormous altar created so that, as light changes, it seems to be moving. It was one of the rare works in Spain to be made of bronze and marble, rather than wood. It was the centerpiece of an enormous complex of art composed of sculpture, painting and architecture which occupies the center of the cathedral.

With the arrival of the Bourbon Dynasty in power, the center of the art world shifted to Madrid, the source of royal commissions. The isolation of Spanish art from the art of the rest of Europe ended, with the arrival of French and Italian artists, who were invited to decorate the royal palace. It also brought new works of art leaning toward the extreme, including the tortured The Head of Saint Paul by Juan Alonso Villabrille y Ron, along with more delicate works, including a sculpture of Saint Florentine by Francisco Salzillo.

The reign of Charles III of Spain (1760–1788), brought an abrupt end to the Spanish Baroque, and a transition to neoclassicism. The King decreed in 1777 that all altar sculptures and retables had to be approved in advance by the Royal Academy of San Fernando, and that marble and stone, not wood, should be used whenever possible in sculpture.

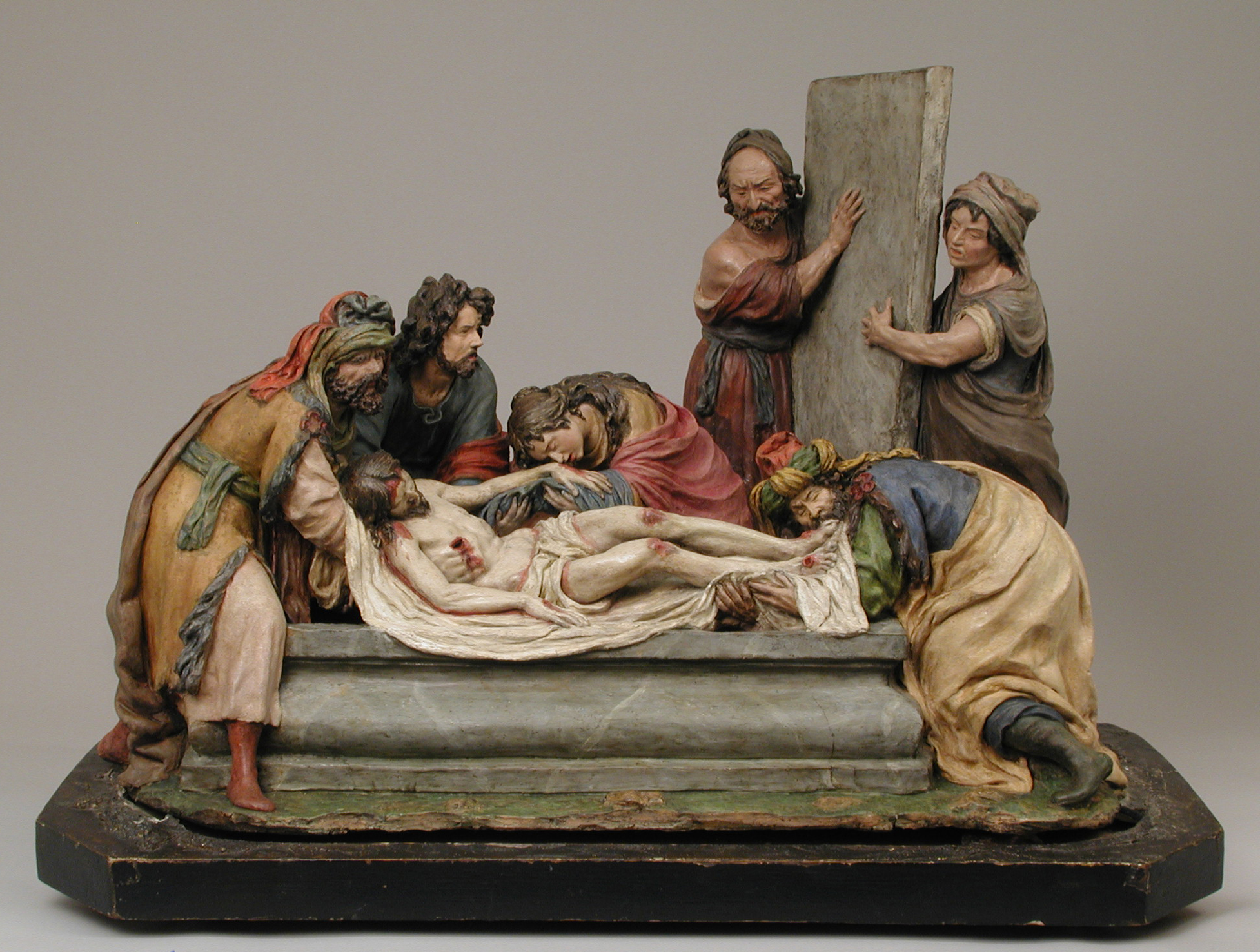
The Entombment of Christ, by Luisa Roldán (1654-1704)

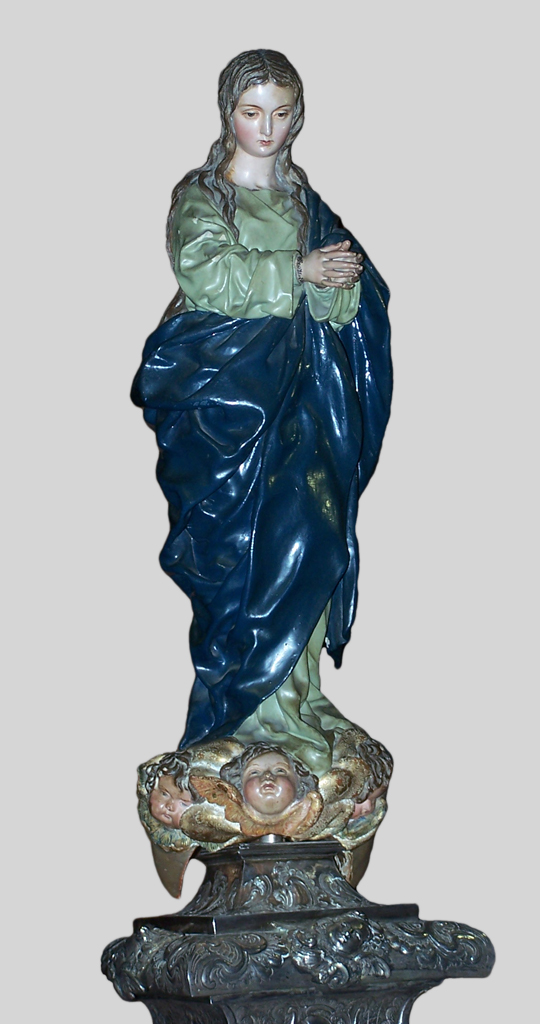
The Immaculate Conception by Alonso Cano, polychrome wood, Granada Cathedral (1655)

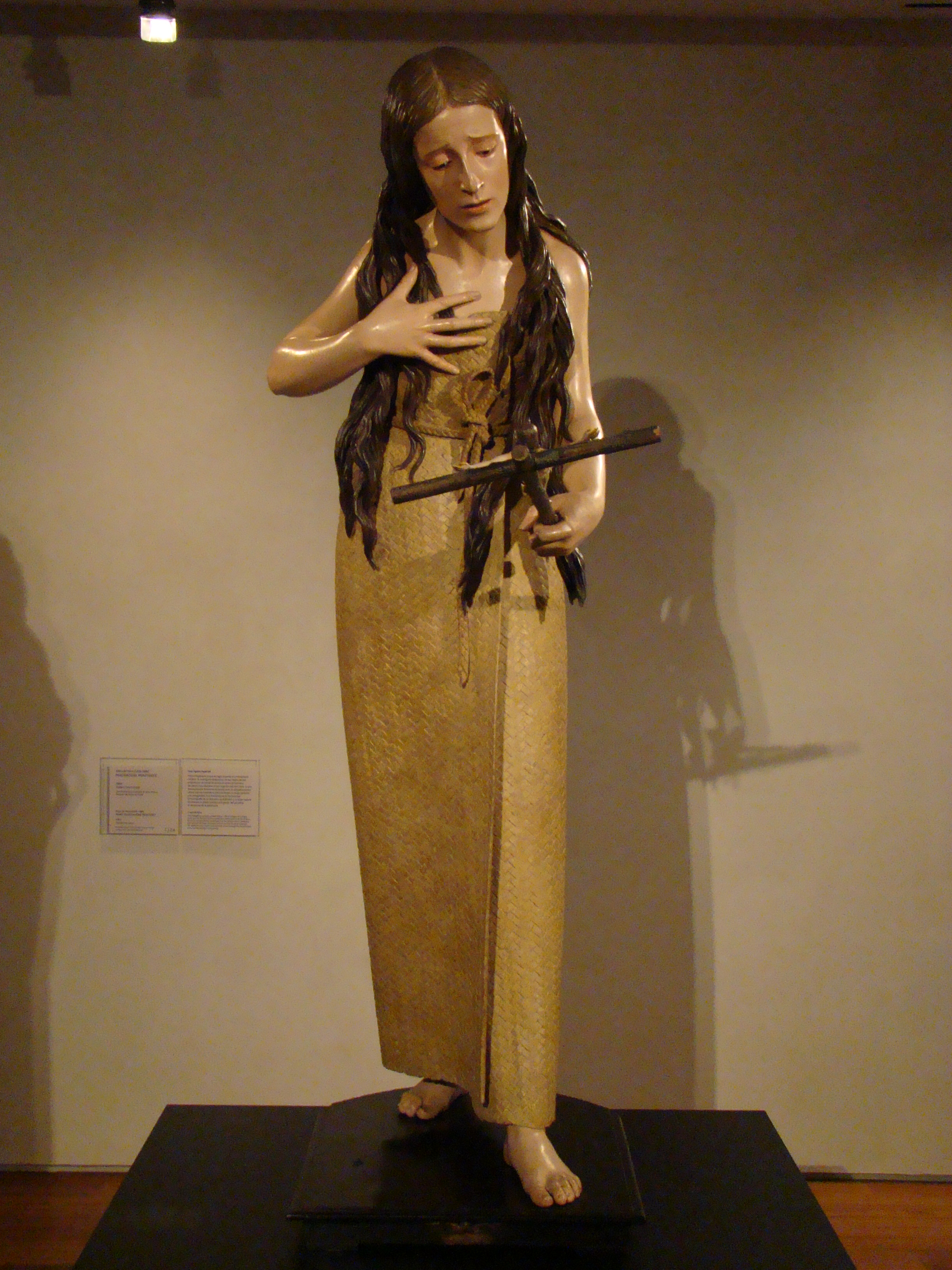
Mary Magdalene the Penitent by Pedro de Mena (1664)

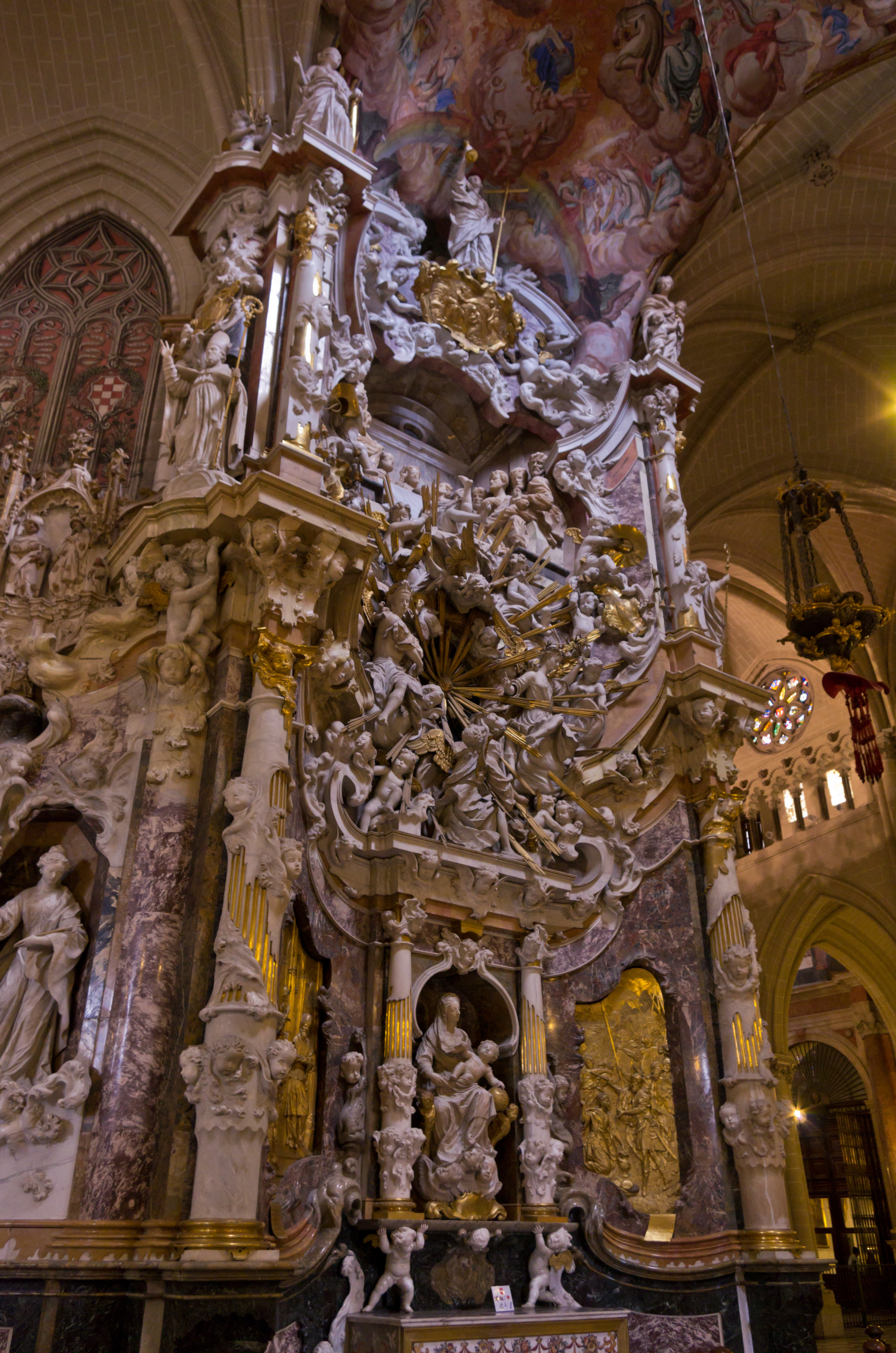
The Transparente by Narciso Tomé, marble and bronze, Toledo Cathedral (1704)

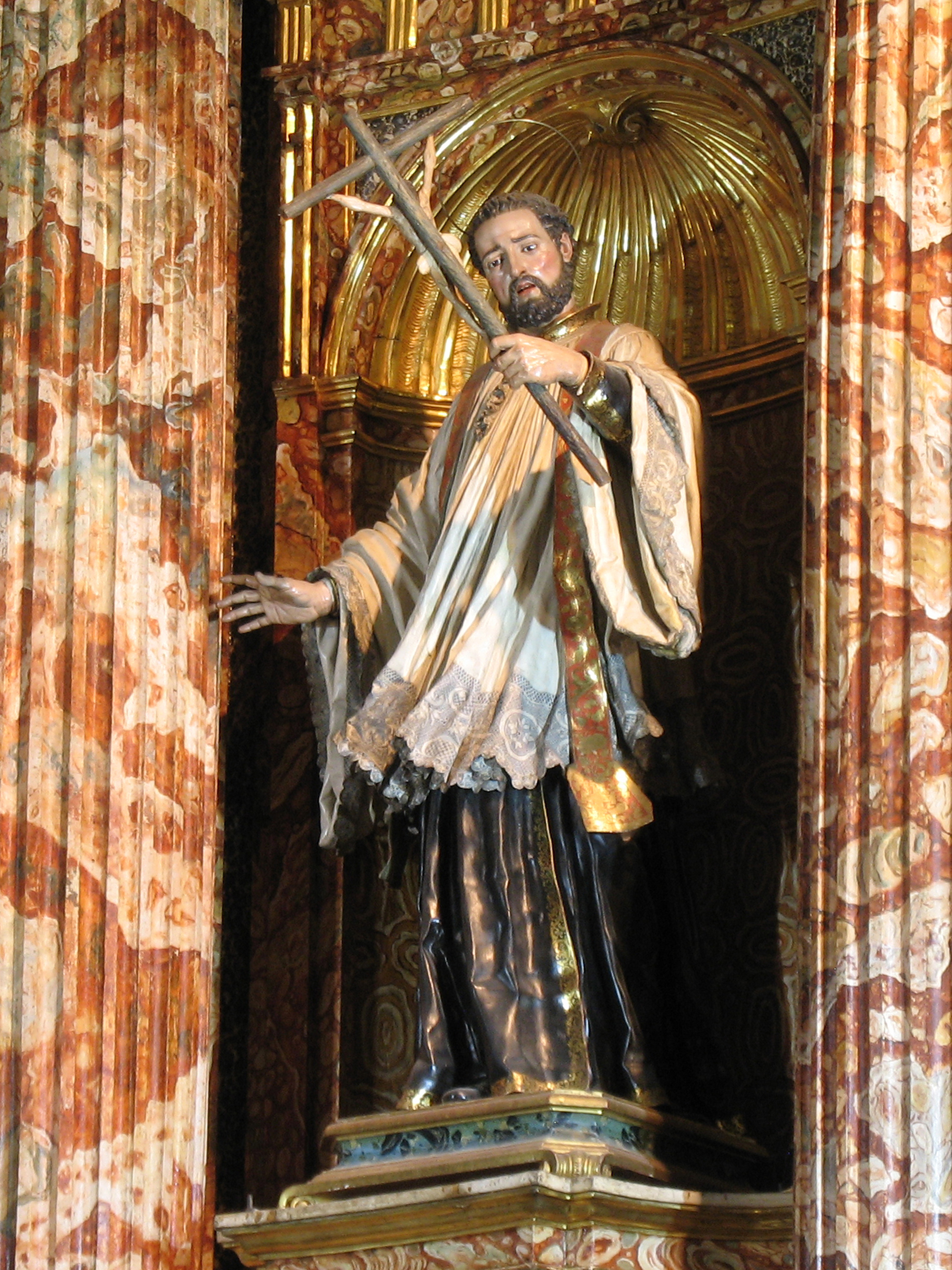
Saint Francis Xavier by Luis Salvador Carmona (1750)

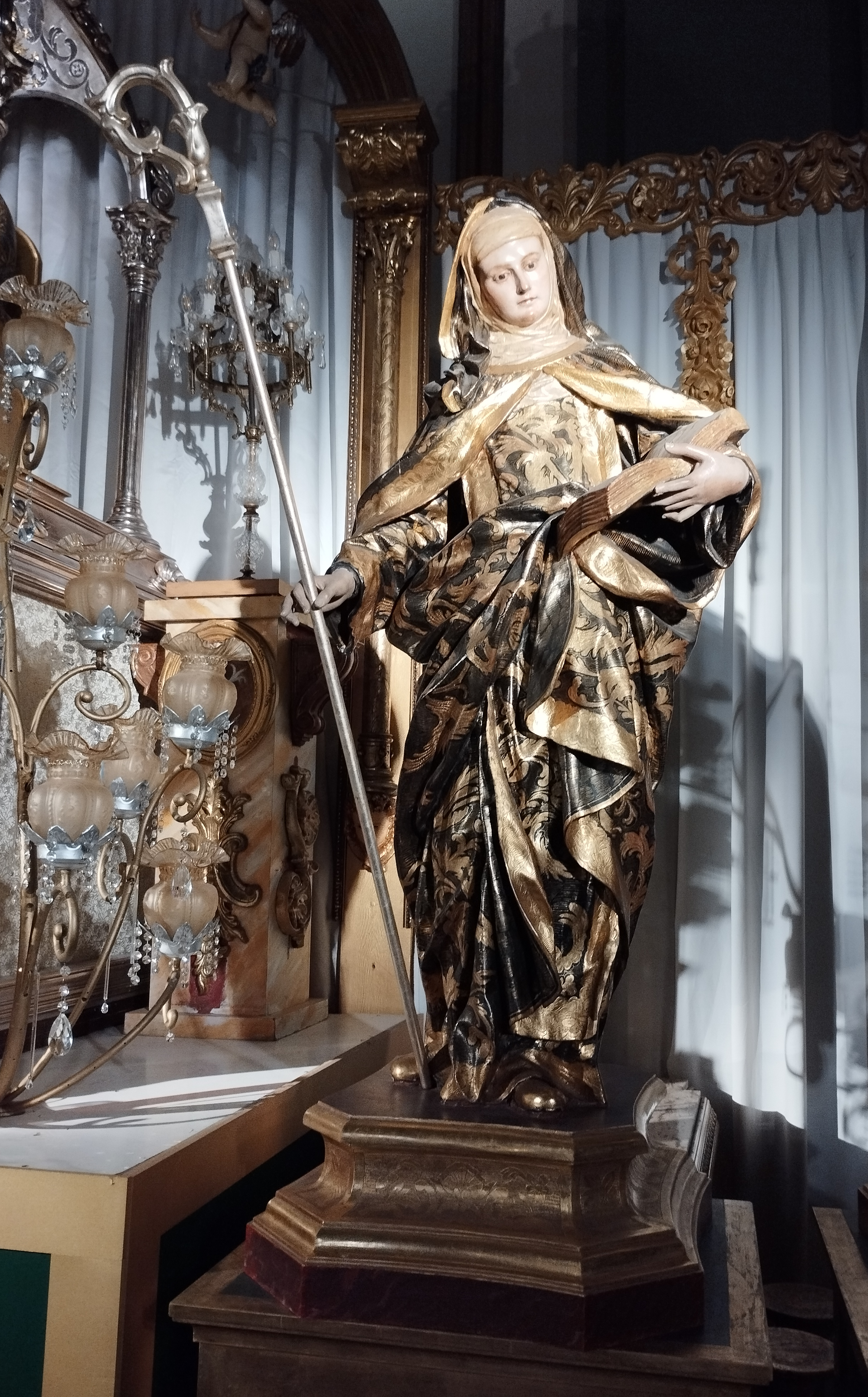
Saint Florentine by Francisco Salzillo (1755)

== Latin America ==
The earliest Baroque sculptor and architect to work in Latin America was Pedro de Noguera (1580-), who was born in Barcelona and apprenticed in Seville. In 1619 he moved to the Viceroyalty of Peru, where, with Martín Alonso de Mesa, he sculpted the Baroque choir stalls of the Cathedral Basilica of Lima (1619-).

The Baroque style of sculpture was transported to other parts of Latin America by Spanish and Portuguese missionaries in the 18th century, who commissioned local artists. It was used primarily in churches. The Quito School in Ecuador was an important group of Baroque sculptors. Prominent artists of the school included Bernardo de Legarda and Caspicara.

Caspicara (1723–1796) was an Ecuadorean artist who made elegant and ornate figures for display in churches. He was a central figure in what is known as the Quito School.

Aleijadinho (1730 or 1738 to 1814), was the son of a Portuguese colonist and an African slave. He is notable for a group of monumental soapstone statues of Saints (1800–1805) for the Santuário de Bom Jesus de Matosinhos in Congonhas, now a UNESCO World Heritage Site. He also made a series of life-sized Passion figures, depicting the events leading to the Crucifixion of Christ (1780–90).

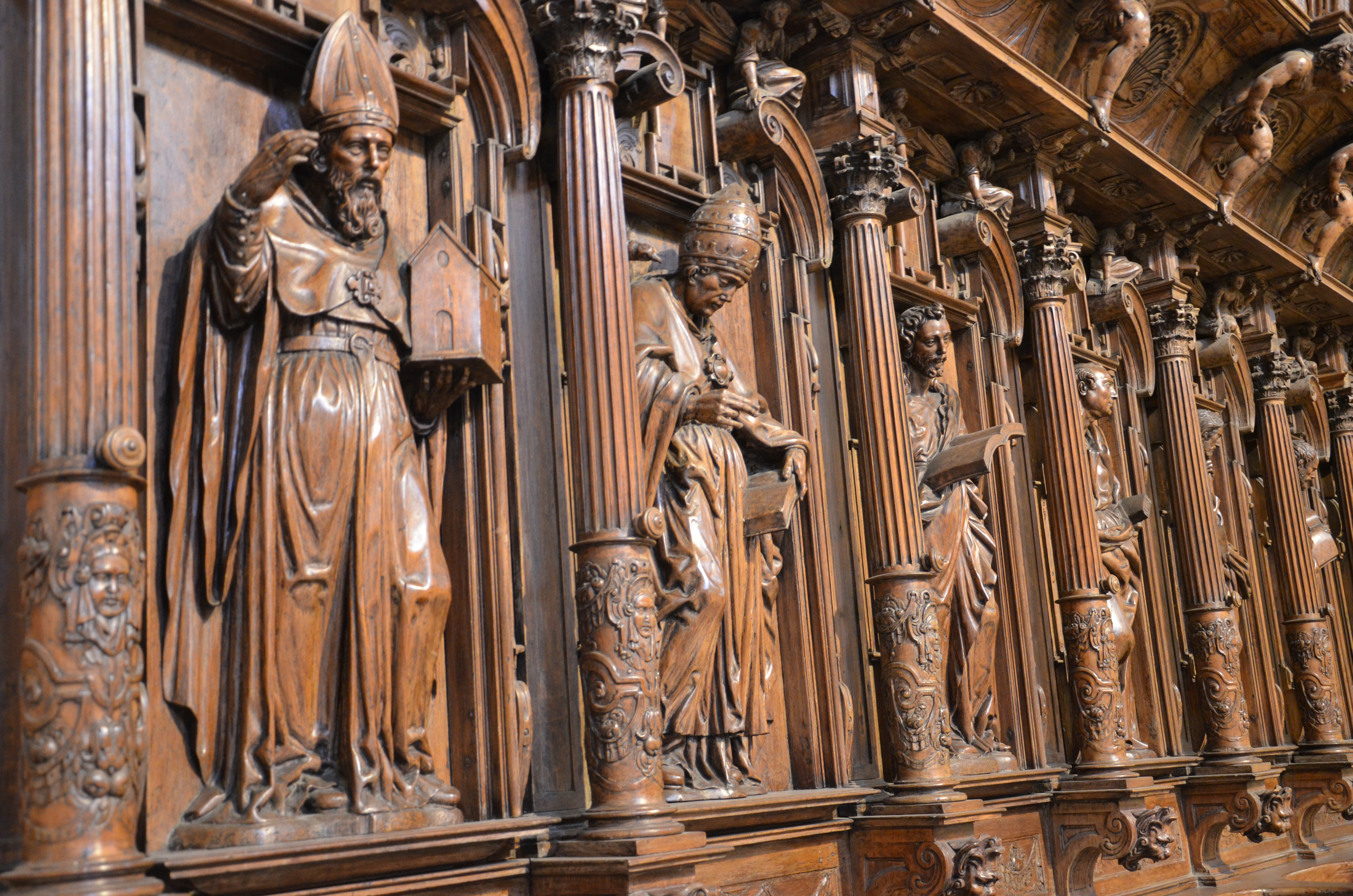
Choir stalls, Cathedral of Lima, Peru, by Pedro de Noguera (1619-)

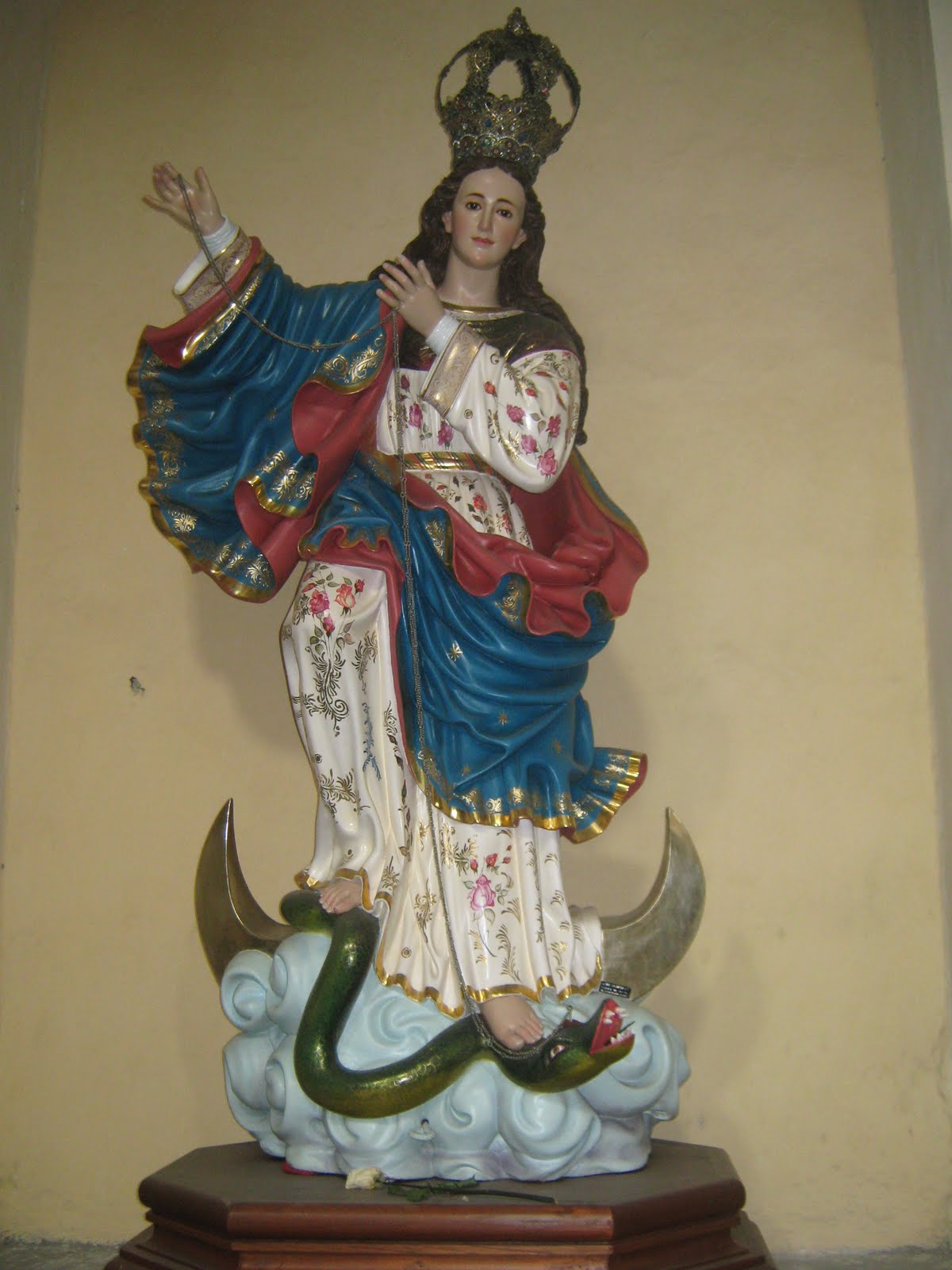
Immaculate Conception of Popayan by Bernardo de Legarda, of the Quito School in Ecuador (18th c.)

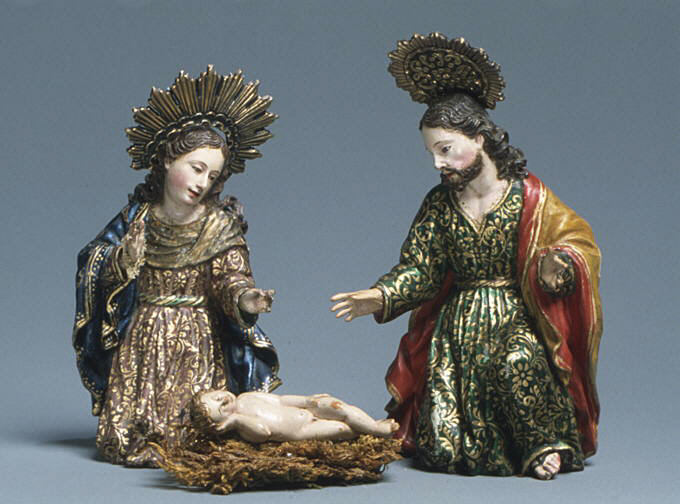
Nativity scene by Caspicara, (Metropolitan Museum of Art) (18th century)

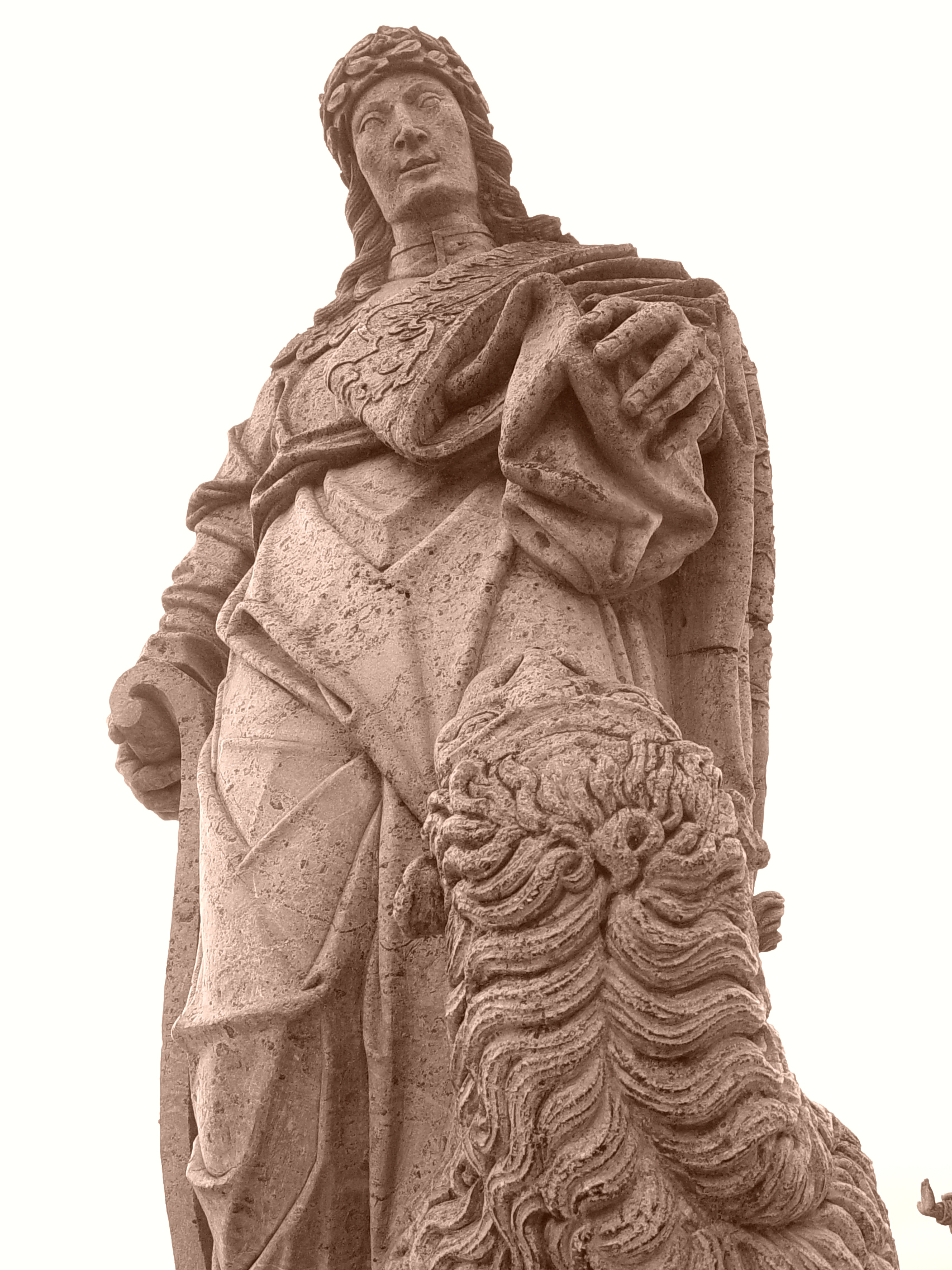
The Prophet Daniel by Aleijadinho in Congonhas (1800-1805)

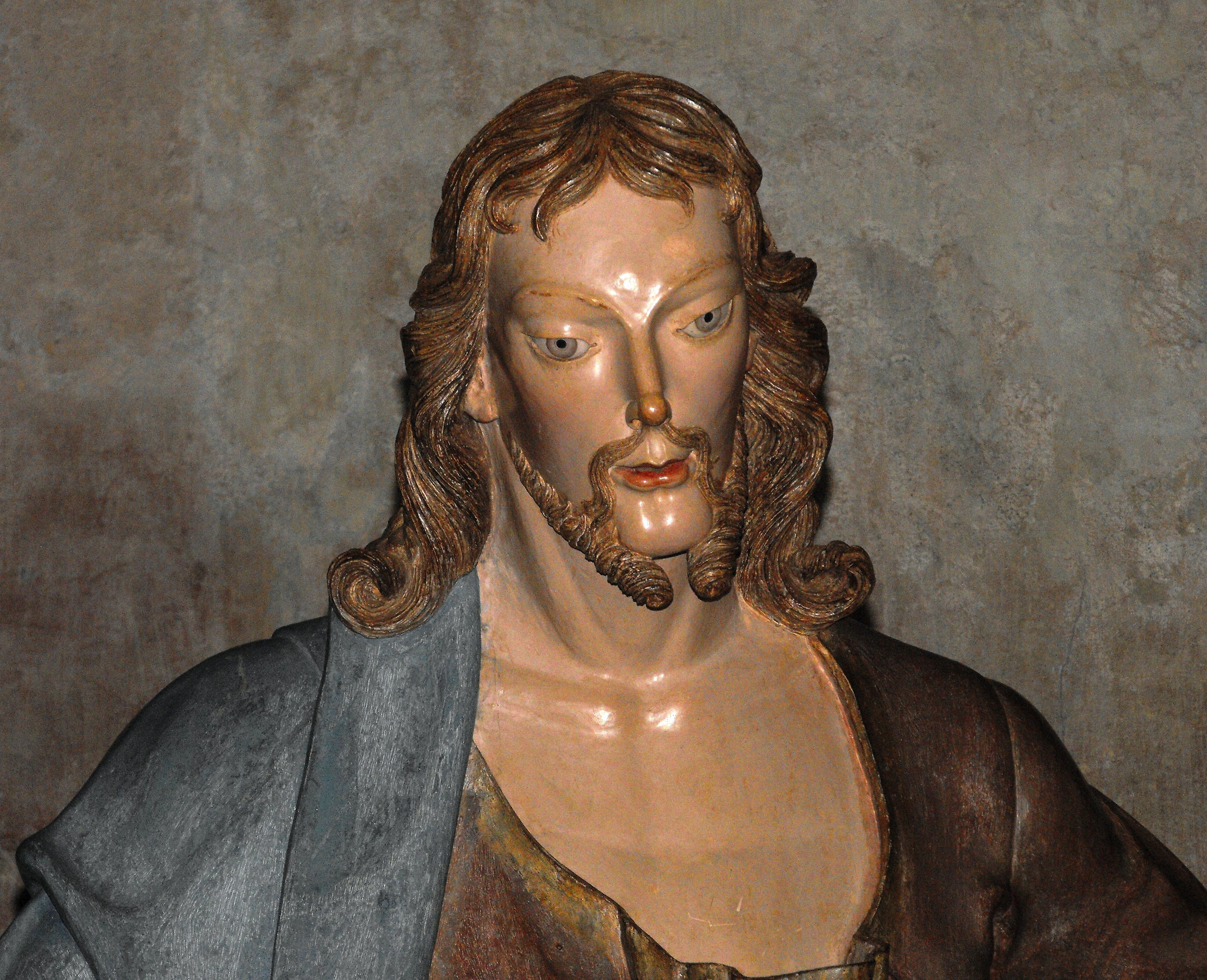
Head of Christ, by Aleijadinho, in Congonhas, Brazil

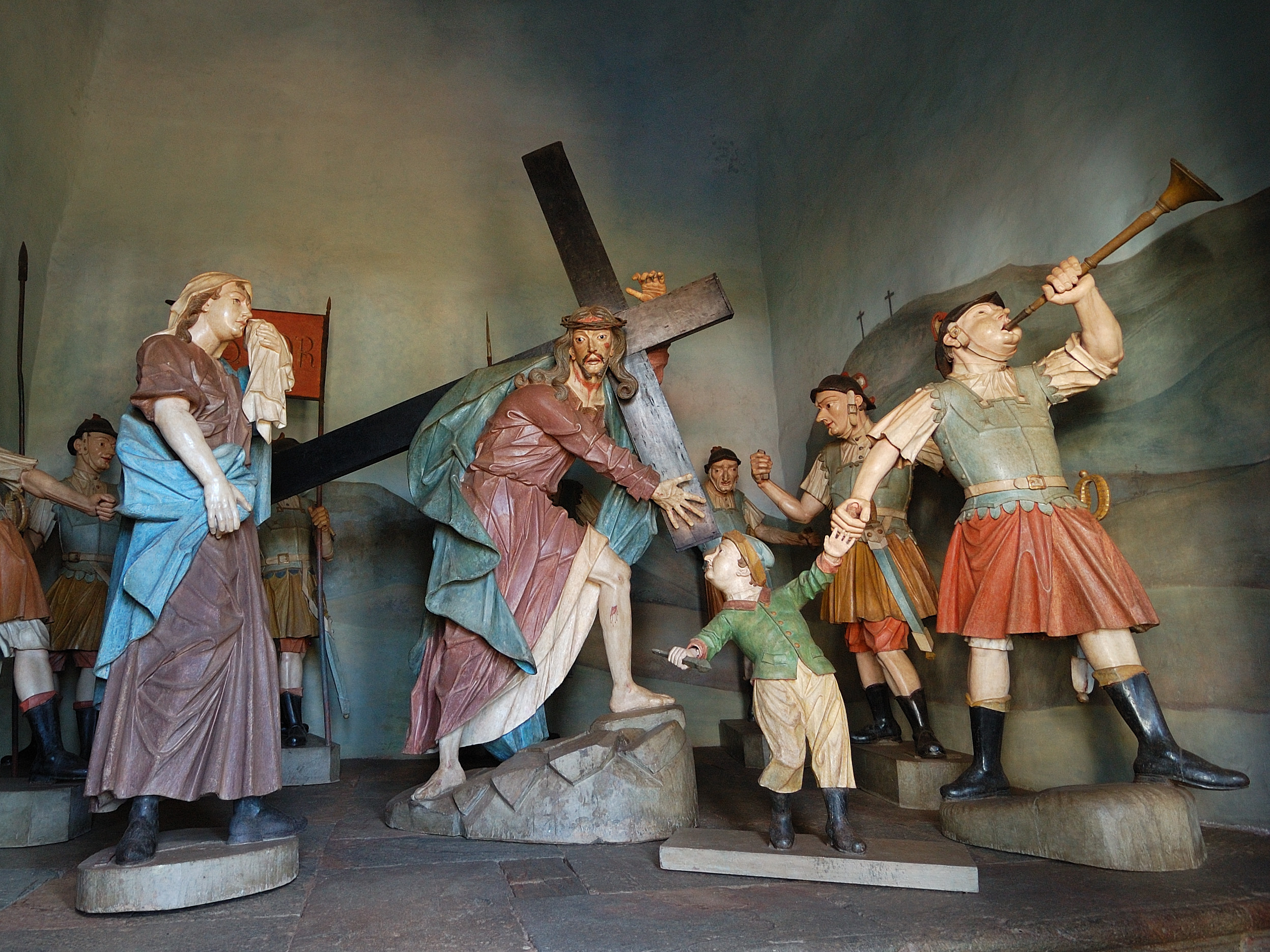
The Road to Golgotha by Aleijadinho in Congonhas (1780–90)

== Bibliography ==
- Boucher, Bruce, Italian Baroque Sculpture, 1998, Thames & Hudson (World of Art), ISBN 0500203075
- Geese, Uwe (2015). "Section on Baroque sculpture". In Toman, Rolf (ed.). L'art baroque architecture, sculpture, peinture. Cologne: H.F. Ullmann. ISBN 978-3-8480-0856-8.
- Jeancolas, Claude (1992). Sculpture Française (in French). Paris: CELIF. ISBN 2-86535-162-9.
- Redondo, José Ignacio Hernánez, Baroque Sculpture in Spain, from Baroque Art - Architecture - Sculpture Painting, H.F. Ullmann, Cologne, 2015. (ISBN 978-3-8480-0856-8)
- Hugh Honour and John Fleming, A World History of Art, 1st edn. 1982 (many later editions), Macmillan, London, page refs to 1984 Macmillan 1st edn. paperback. ISBN 0333371852
