= Maderno =

Maderno can refer to:

- Carlo Maderno, Italian 17th-century architect
- Stefano Maderno, Italian 17th-century sculptor
- Maderno, a town in the comune of Toscolano-Maderno, Lombardy, Italy
- Cesano Maderno, a comune in the province of Milan, Lombardy, Italy
