= Saint Cecilia (Stefano Maderno) =

Sculpture by Stefano Maderno

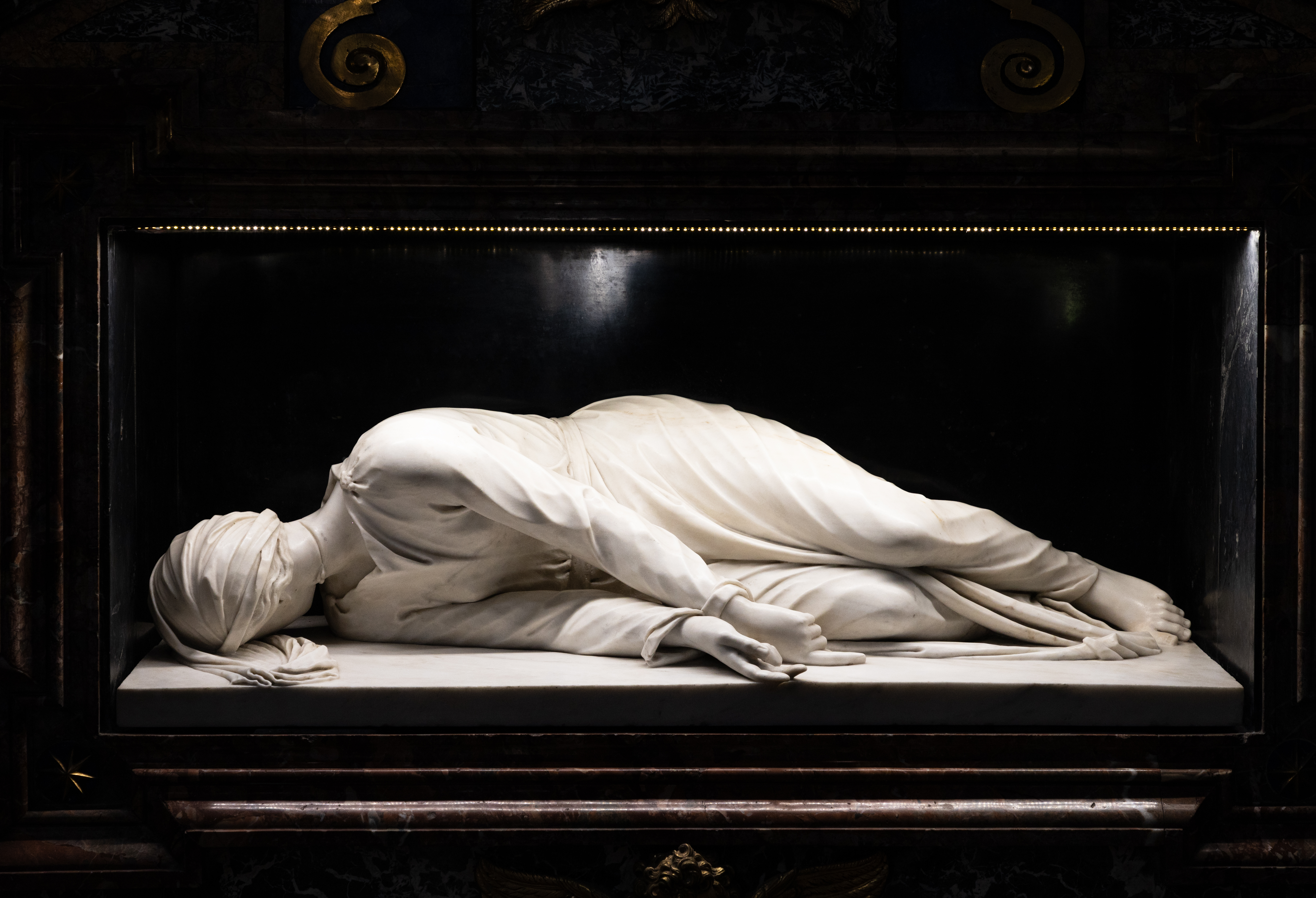
- Artist: Stefano Maderno
- Year: c. 1600
- Medium: Pentelic marble
- Subject: Saint Cecilia
- Dimensions: 131 cm (52 in)
- Location: Santa Cecilia in Trastevere, Rome

Saint Cecilia is a marble sculpture by the Italian sculptor Stefano Maderno, completed c. 1600 for Santa Cecilia in Trastevere in Rome, Italy.

The work depicts Saint Cecilia lying on her side with her head turned, recalling contemporary descriptions of her body when her tomb was opened in 1599. Maderno’s inscription states that he represented the posture in which she was reportedly found, though the accuracy of this claim is uncertain. Scholars highlight the sculpture’s naturalism and simplicity, which established Maderno’s early reputation and the work's place in the development of Baroque sculpture. The piece influenced later depictions of Saint Cecilia and served as a model for her iconography in the early modern period.

== History ==
=== Background ===
From 1597 to 1599, Santa Cecilia in Trastevere underwent renovations in anticipation of the Jubilee of 1600, led by the basilica's titular cardinal, Paolo Emilio Sfondrati. An erudite churchman with a strong interest in early Christianity, Sfondrati spent nearly 25,000 scudi restoring the ninth-century basilica, intending to recover what he saw as the primitive spirituality of Rome's first Christians. Aware of Pope Paschal I's translation of Saint Cecilia's relics to the basilica in 821, he directed excavations beneath the crypt in search of the bodies. On 22 October 1599, three marble sarcophagi were discovered under the high altar which, according to Antonio Bosio's account, contained the incorrupt bodies of Saints Cecilia, Valerian, and Tiburtius, as well as Popes Lucius I and Urban I.

Pope Clement VIII dispatched the historian and cardinal Caesar Baronius to investigate the discovery. His and Bosio's accounts were published in 1600 in a volume titled Historia passionis beatae Ceciliae. Bosio describes the body of Saint Cecilia as perfectly preserved, lying on her right side with her legs slightly bent and her arms stretched forward, covered by a blood-stained silk cloth. In 2005, however, historian Tomaso Montanari published an anonymous eyewitness account of the rediscovery that offers more detail than Bosio's narrative and contradicts it regarding Cecilia's exact position, even including drawings to illustrate the differences. Art historian Maryvelma Smith O'Neil notes that all eyewitnesses to this rediscovery report an unwillingness to disturb the veil that covered the body; therefore, no one actually laid eyes on Cecilia's face to confirm with any scienfific accuracy that it was in fact incorrupt.

Ten days after the discovery, the relics were displayed beneath the ciborium of the basilica for public veneration. According to Ottavio Panciroli, "all of Rome struggled to see such a treasure." (Note: Translated by Emma Stirrup.) Clement VIII visited on 10 November 1599, and on Saint Cecilia's feast day (22 November) the saints were reinterred in their original resting places beneath the high altar.

=== Commission ===
Shortly after the discovery, Cardinal Sfondrati commissioned the young sculptor Stefano Maderno to commemorate the event with a sculpture to be placed in the central niche of the high altar. Up to that point, Maderno had worked primarily as a restorer of antiquities, making the statue of Saint Cecilia his first major public commission. Sfondrati likely chose the relatively inexperienced twenty-three-year-old both for their shared interest in antiquities and because he wanted a sculpture that would document the circumstances of Cecilia's exhumation rather than provide a more artistic or idealized memorial of her sainthood.

The intent of patron and artist is made explicit in the Latin inscription in front of the sculpture which reads:

EN TIBI SANCTISSIMÆ VIRGINIS CÆCILIÆ IMAGINEM / QVAM IPSE INTEGRAM IN SEPVLCHRO IACENTEM VIDI / EANDEM TIBI PRORSVS EODEM CORPORIS SITV / HOC MARMORE EXPRESSI

Translation:

Gaze upon the likeness of the most holy virgin Cecilia, / which I saw myself lying in an entire state in the sepulcher. / I have had this same likeness, precisely in the same position her body lay, / expressed for you in marble. (Note: Translated by Tobias Kämpf.)

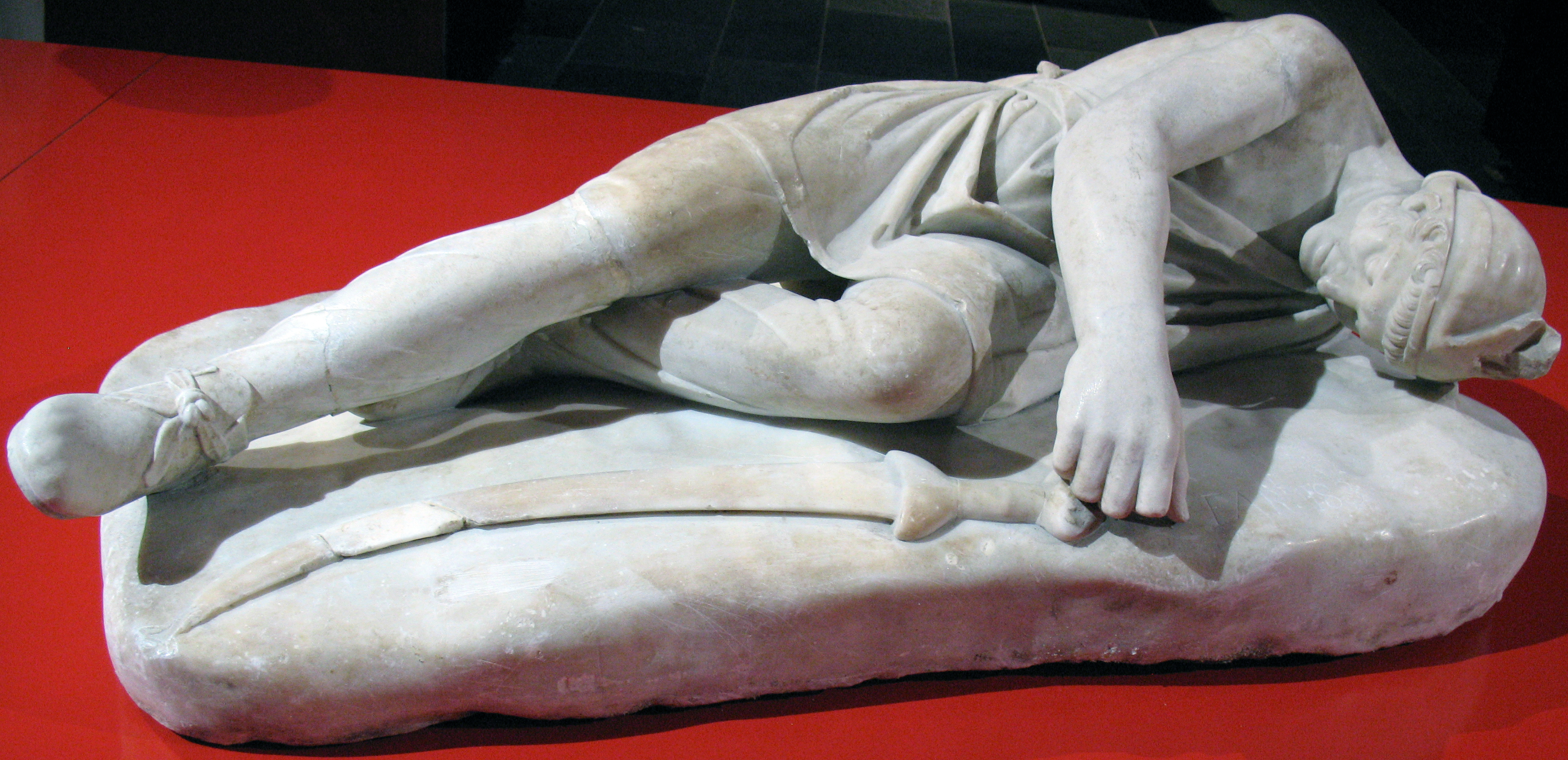
Dying Persian, marble, 2nd century BCE; National Archaeological Museum, Naples.

The emphasis on documenting the discovery was significant in the context of the Counter-Reformation, when the Catholic Church actively sought and publicized verifiable evidence of its theology through archaeology. In commissioning this work during the 1600 Jubilee, Sfondrati sought to reaffirm the church's interest in the early saints and their relics in the face of mounting Protestant critiques. While Maderno's inscription presents the sculpture as based solely on his direct observation of the saint's body in situ, modern scholars suggest he may also have drawn inspiration from reclining statues of antiquity, such as the Dying Persian in the Farnese Collection or the Sleeping Hermaphroditus in the Borghese Collection. Art historian Anna Lo Bianco argues that these works, or others like them, would likely have been known to both the artist and his patron, given their shared interest in ancient Roman sculpture. Regardless of his precise sources, the work represented a notable artistic achievement for Maderno, who was paid 65 scudi after its completion. (Note: First published by Nava Antonia Cellini.)

=== Reception ===
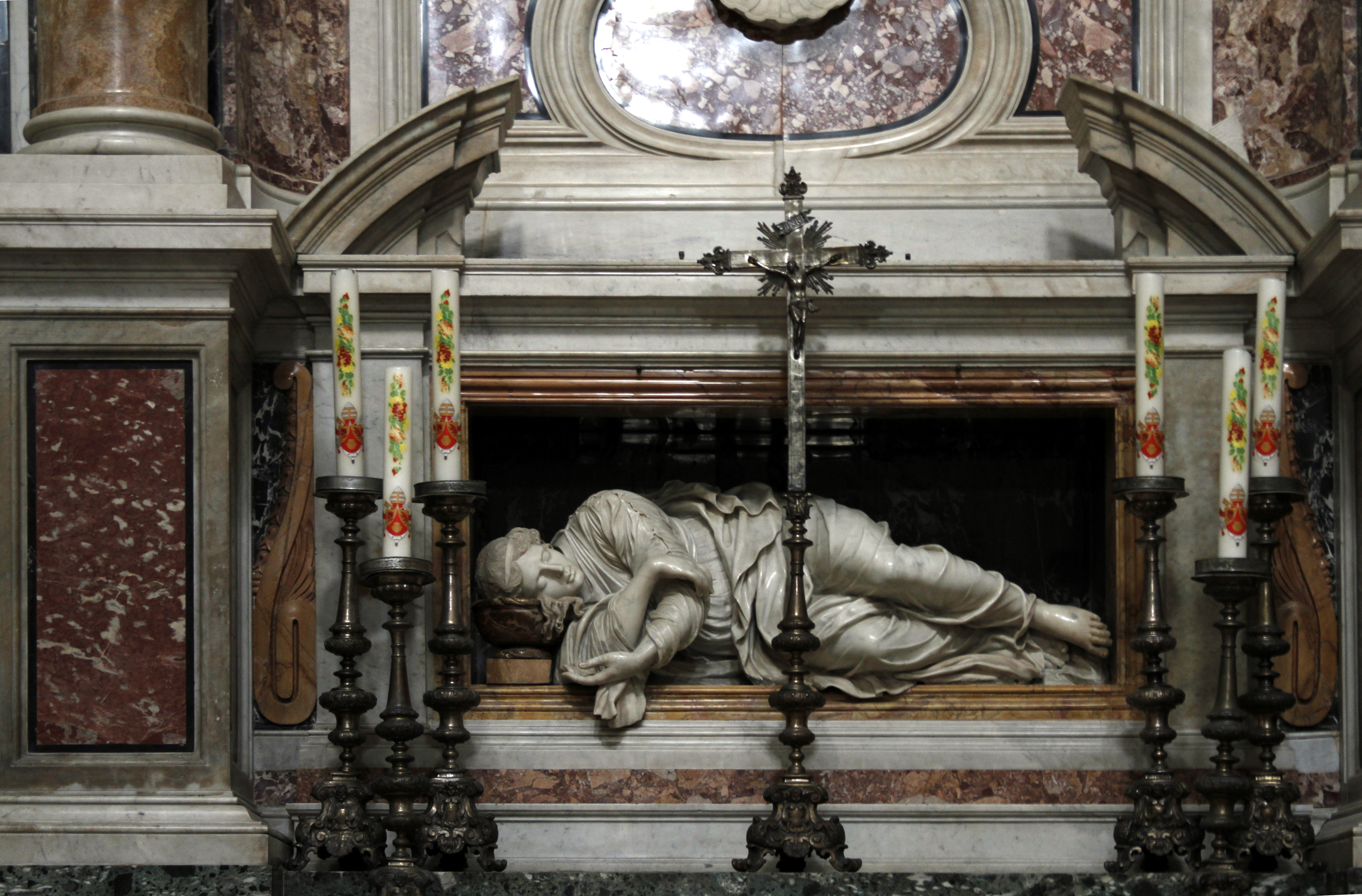
Santa Martina giacente, 1635, marble by Niccolò Menghini, Sainti Luca e Martina, Rome.

Before the commission, there was already a strong interest in Saint Cecilia and her relics through the proliferation of her story in guidebooks to Rome for Christian pilgrims. In fact, in the atrium of Santa Cecilia in Trastevere, there was a now-lost series of twelfth-century frescoes depicting the life of Saint Cecilia. While they were likely destroyed or damaged in the eighteenth century, they were preserved in the form of drawings preserved in the Vatican Library. (Note: Vatican Library, Cod. barb. lat. 4402, fol. 20ff.)

Maderno's sculpture appears to have established an iconographic standard for artists depicting the death of Saint Cecilia in both painting and sculpture.

In 1602, Cardinal Sfondrati's favored painter Francesco Vanni was commissioned to paint The Agony of Saint Cecilia for the monastery attached to the basilica. While Vanni's painting shows Cecilia surviving for three days after her neck was cut off, it employs a lunette-shaped canvas that frames her body in a manner reminiscent of how Maderno used the niche to frame his statue. Art historian Harula Economopoulos argues that Vanni's work functioned as a pendant to Maderno's, presenting the dichotomy of life and death in the saint's martyrdom.

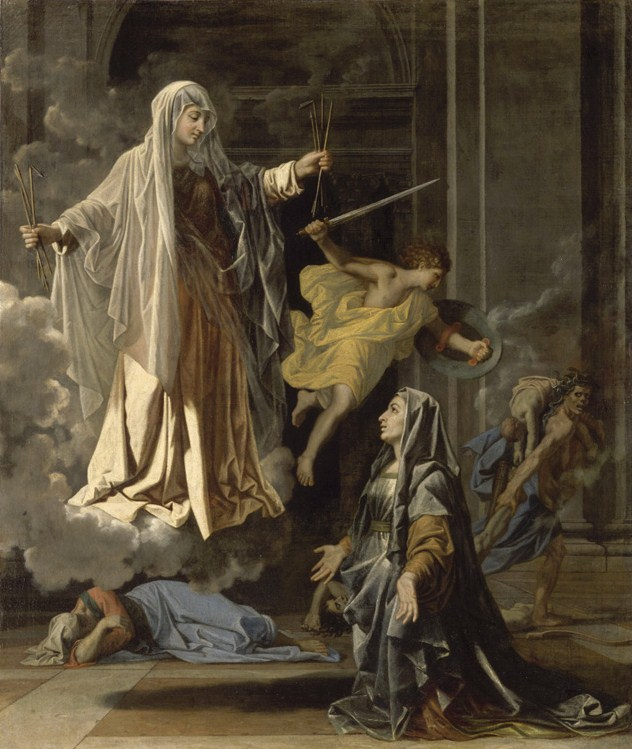
La Vision de sainte Françoise Romaine, 1657-1658, oil on canvas by Nicolas Poussin; Musée du Louvre, Paris.

A similar dialogue appears in Domenichino's fresco cycle Scenes from the Life of Saint Cecilia at San Luigi dei Francesi, where Cecilia is shown dressed in white with a turban on her head, echoing the headwear of Maderno's statue, while lying on a comparable marble slab. In another Roman church, Niccolò Menghini executed a sculpture of Saint Martina in Santi Luca e Martina that also sits in a black marble niche and bears a striking resemblance to Maderno's work.

The most celebrated allusion to Maderno's sculpture is found in Nicolas Poussin's La Vision de saint Françoise Romaine (1657), which depicts Frances of Rome arriving to end the plague in 1656. Behind the saint, a deceased woman lies on her side with her head covered, recalling the posture of Maderno's Saint Cecilia. According to Lo Bianco, Poussin's reference is more conceptual than visual, as both works celebrate the archaic spirituality of female saints associated with Trastevere.

The sculpture continued to resonate with viewers into the modern era. The Marquis de Sade saw it during his 1775 grand tour of Italy and praised its arresting naturalism in the unpublished Voyage d'Italie. Johann Wolfgang von Goethe and Nathaniel Hawthorne likewise recorded their impressions of the work during their visits to Rome. In his Promenades dans Rome (1829), Stendhal wrote admiringly of the statue's transformative power, noting that he frequently returned to Santa Cecilia in Trastevere to contemplate it during his stay in the city.

Even today, the sculpture remains a focus of devotional practice. Visitors and parishioners traditionally kneel before it and lean into the niche to kiss the wounds on the back of Cecilia's neck. During the work's restoration in the early 2000s, analysis revealed significant wax drops around the sculpture's neck, likely due to centuries of parishioners attempting to view her face by using candlelight.

== Description ==
=== Physical description ===
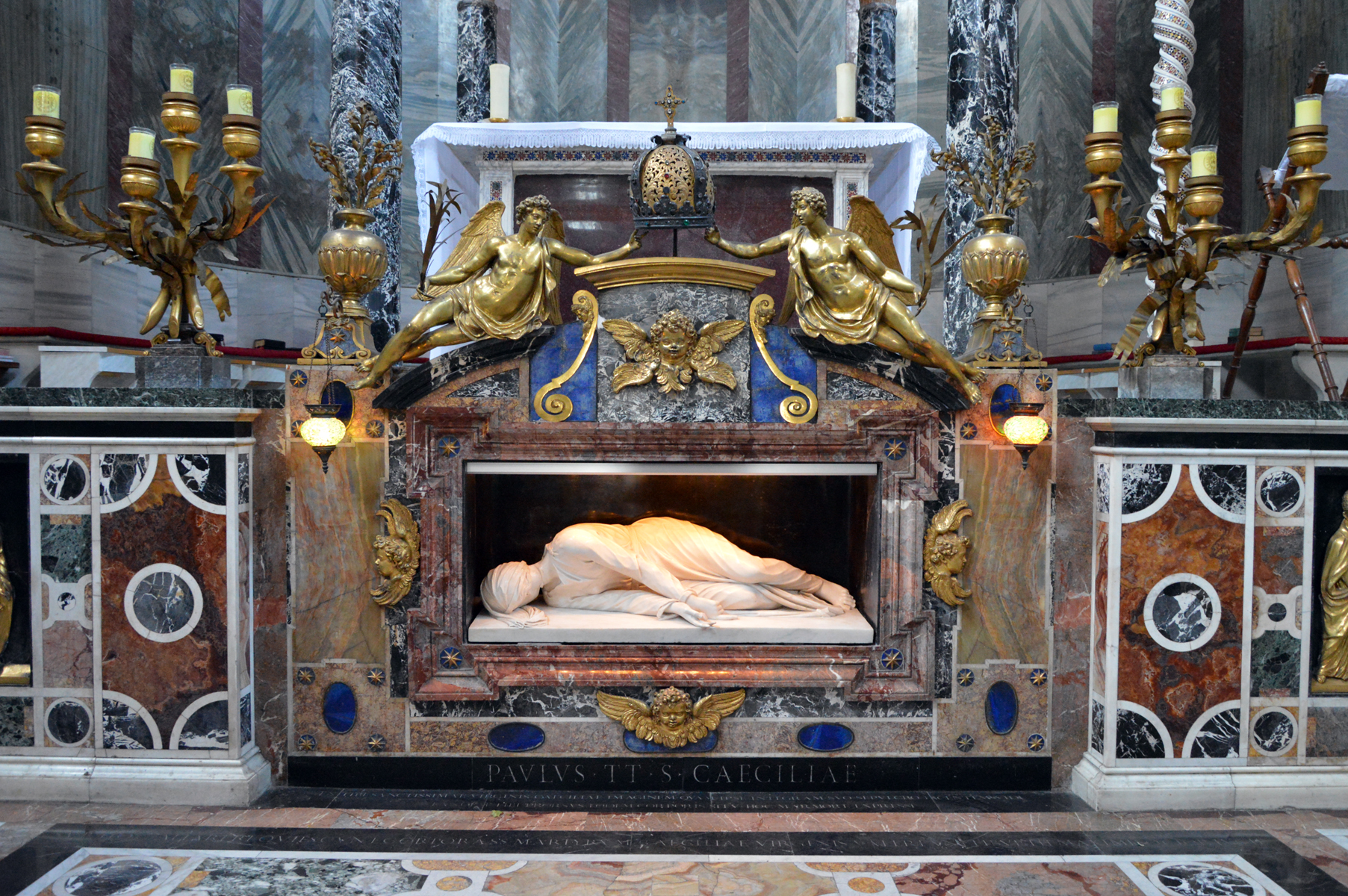
Saint Cecilia underneath the high altar in Santa Cecilia in Trastevere.

The sculpture occupies a central position at the high altar in the nave of Santa Cecilia in Trastevere and serves as the focal point of the church’s lower register. Contrasting with its ornate black marble niche, the white marble figure is depicted lying on her right side with her head turned away from the viewer. The Pentelic marble statue is slightly smaller than life-size, measuring 131 cm (52 in) in length. Cecilia is clothed in a simple dress with her head wrapped in a turban. The drapery, tucked between her legs, reveals the contours of her body beneath the thin fabric. Her hands rest in front of her legs, with the index finger extending just beyond the marble slab into the space of the viewer.

=== Iconography ===
Several details in the sculpture allude to Cecilia’s martyrdom and sanctity. Three cuts are visible on the neck, referring to the traditional account in which the executioner struck her three times, leaving her alive for three days before she succumbed to her wounds. Anna Lo Bianco notes that the three outstretched fingers on Cecilia's right hand may symbolize these three days of agony. Her incorruptible body lies in a peaceful, sleep-like pose, which art historian Tobias Kämpf interprets as an allusion to Christ in limbo, a state that also lasted three days. Just as Christ awaited his resurrection, so too does Cecilia's body remains intact as she awaits the Second Coming, when her soul and body would be reunited, as depicted in the apse mosaic above.

== Analysis ==
=== Location ===
Placed directly beneath the high altar and aligned on the same vertical axis as the apse mosaic, Saint Cecilia commands the viewer's attention and anchors the visual narrative of the basilica's west end. In the years following the Council of Trent, ecclesiastical sculpture experienced a revival, yet such works were usually confined to side chapels or niches rather than serving as central objects of veneration (e.g., Michelangelo's Pietà). Art historian Damian Dombrowski observes that around 1600, centrally located sculptural altarpieces began to reemerge in Rome, since their physical presence uniquely allowed their subject to enter the viewer's reality.

Sfondrati's architectural interventions at Santa Cecilia in Trastevere included moving the high altar steps to the aisles, thereby allowing the niche containing Maderno's sculpture to become the focal point at the nave level. By opening the space where the Eucharist was celebrated, both architecturally and visually, Kämpf argues that "Cecilia now lay at the heart of the rite on an axis that the sacral protagonist—the officiating priest—would manifestly activate during the elevation of the host."

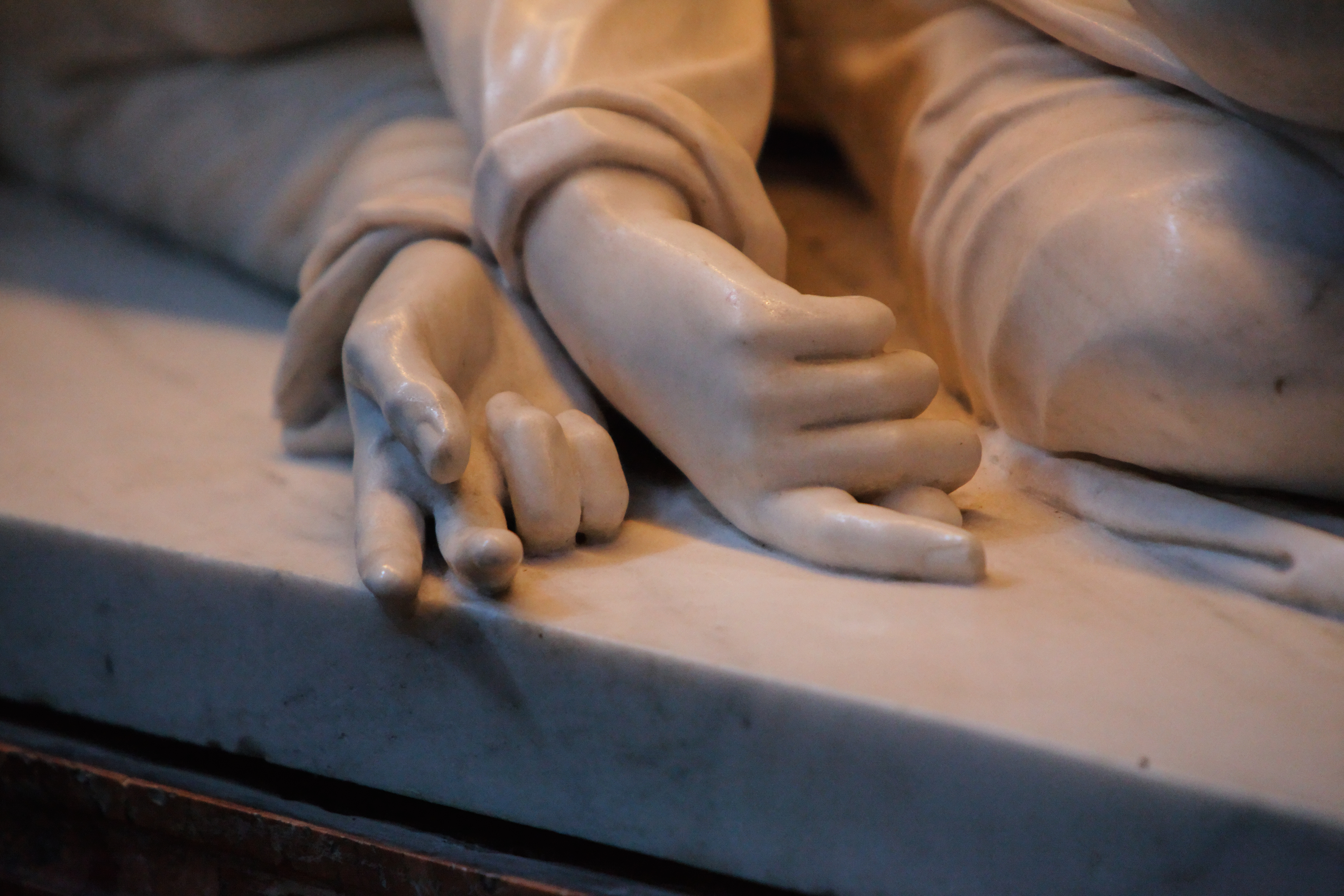
Detail of Saint Cecilia.

=== Narrative ===
Before entering the basilica, visitors would first encounter a series of twelfth-century frescoes in the atrium depicting the life of Saint Cecilia. Today, only a fragment depicting Paschal I's translation of the saint's relics to the basilica survives, but until the eighteenth century visitors would be able to view all of the episodes in the life of Saint Cecilia. A narrow band of mosaics on the above entablature also depicted Saint Cecilia and her fellow martyrs, which further entrenched the church not only as a space dedicated to the saint, but as a testament to the events of her life. Inside, one's gaze would rise to the ninth-century apse mosaic, which again depicted Cecilia and her companions, this time accompanied by Pope Paschal I and Saint Agatha, another female martyr, in heaven. After viewing Maderno's sculpture in the nave, pilgrims would move through a side aisle to the lower level to venerate Cecilia's relics and sarcophagus before reemerging into the nave where the sculpture stood. This spatial arrangement, designed to guide devotional movement, reinforced both the physicality of Cecilia's martyrdom and her perceived incorruptibility.

The sculpture stylistically contrasts with the ninth-century mosaic, which presents a more abstracted, celestial image of the saint. Art historian Helen Hills has argued that Maderno sought to blur the boundaries between heaven and earth, since the work simultaneously conveys Cecilia's bodily martyrdom and her incorruptibility as a saint. Similarly, medieval literary scholar C. David Benson observes that the sculpture bridges past and present, while its position beneath the high altar, where the Eucharist was performed, evoked the crucifixion and resurrection of Jesus. The emphasis on Cecilia's lifelike body as both corpse and relic anticipates the Baroque taste for theatrical revelation, later seen in Gian Lorenzo Bernini's dramatic staging of sacred figures.

=== Significance ===
Saint Cecilia marks a pivotal moment in Italian sculpture, signaling a shift away from Mannerism and toward the Baroque. While Maderno employed the figura serpetinata typical of his Mannerist predecessors (e.g., Giambologna's Abduction of a Sabine Woman or Cellini's Perseus), he grounded his figure in a strikingly naturalistic pose. Although the work's documentary nature appears deliberate based on the inscription, it is Maderno's restraint, eschewing Mannerist exaggeration, that points toward a proto-Baroque interest in drama, corporeality, and light.

Sfondrati further enhanced the effect by reopening clerestory windows, allowing light to flood the nave and accentuate Maderno's delicate treatment of Cecilia's drapery. The sculpture's chiaroscuro effects derive from the deep shadows cast by the slumped torso, the high relief of the garments, and the way the head, hands, and feet subtly extend beyond the marble slab into the viewer's space. This integration of sculpture, architecture, and light reflects the Baroque ambition to produce a totalizing sensory impact, an approach later perfected by Maderno's successor, Bernini (e.g., Ecstasy of Saint Teresa).
