= Stefano Maderno =

Italian sculptor (c. 1576–1636)

- Born: 1576 probably Palestrina, Italy
- Died: 17 September 1636; Rome
- Notable work: Saint Cecilia
- Style: Baroque

Stefano Maderno (c. 1576 – 17 September 1636) was an Italian Baroque sculptor active mostly in Rome. His first and most notable public commission, Saint Cecilia, displays the artistic transition between the Baroque and Mannerism.

== Biography ==
Information about Maderno's life is scarce and often contradictory. He was long supposed to have been a brother of the contemporary architect Carlo Maderno, and therefore to having been born at Capolago, in what is now Ticino. His death certificate, however, gave his place of birth as Palestrina and he signed a bas-relief in the Cappella Paolina in Santa Maria Maggiore as a Roman: STEPHANVS MADERNVS ROMANVS F ("Stefano Maderno of Rome made [this]").

Maderno began by copying statues of antiquity and made several highly esteemed models in bronze. He is best known for the seemingly unposed, naturalistic recumbent marble of Santa Cecilia in Santa Cecilia in Trastevere (1599–1600), which immediately established his reputation.

Elected to the Accademia di San Luca in 1607, Maderno became the pre-eminent sculptor of his generation, on the cusp between Mannerism and Baroque, rivalled in his prime only by Camillo Mariani, though he was eclipsed in his later years by the rapidly rising star of Bernini. His patron, Count Gaspare Rivaldi, having sought to reward him by procuring for him a sinecure at the excise offices of the Gabelle di Ripetta, the sculptor dutifully devoted his time to his new duties and neglected his art.

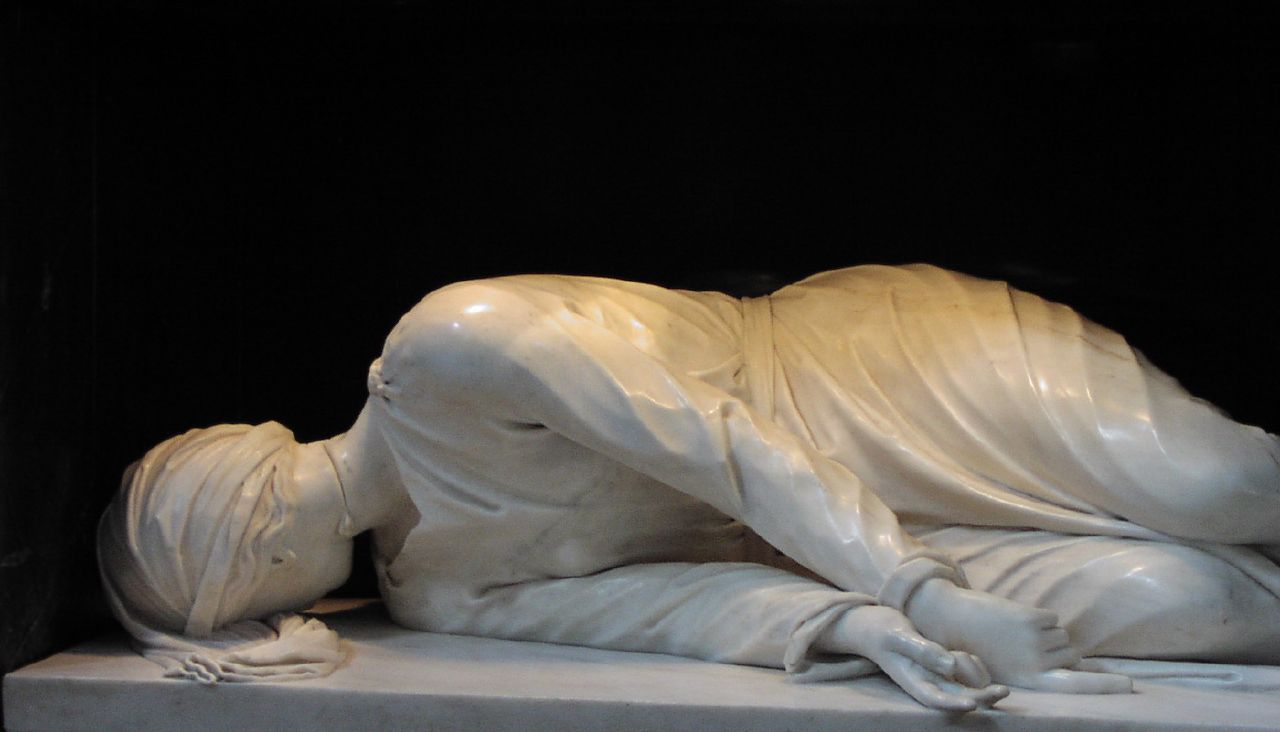
Saint Cecilia, Stefano Maderno's masterpiece, in the Church of Saint Cecilia, Rome.

== Works ==
The ʻʻSanta Ceciliaʻʻ was a counter-statement to the current dry and hectic complications of Mannerism, to which it confronted a simple sweeping outline and a stark pose. This is not a sanitized hagiographical representation of a saint, but the graphic representation of an uncorrupted corpse, claimed to be positioned just as it had been found. The saint's tomb had been opened in 1599, and Cardinal Paolo Emilio Sfondrato commissioned Maderno, very young at the time, to recreate the martyr's body in marble. Compare this statue with the passionately theatrical representations of Saint Theresa and Ludovica Albertoni by Bernini, and the Santa Rosa de Lima by Melchiorre Caffà.

He also provided a marble Prudence for the tomb of Michele Bonelli, known as the Cardinale Alessandrino, in Santa Maria sopra Minerva, and provided two bas-reliefs for Paul V's Cappella Paolina at Santa Maria Maggiore (1608–1615); probably the figure of St. Peter for the façade of the Quirinal Palace; a statue of St. Charles Borromeo in the church of San Lorenzo in Damaso; decorative figures of putti in the Sistine Chapel of Santa Maria Maggiore, angels of the Madonna di Loreto and Santa Maria sopra Minerva and the reclining figures of Peace and Justice for the high altar at Santa Maria della Pace.

Of the few sculptures outside of Italy, Cincinnati has a small bronze (c. 1622–25) portraying Hercules and Antaeus, wherein Hercules has to lift Antaeus off the ground to kill him . Finally there are several bozzetti— terracotta sketches, in Maderno's case highly finished ones— at the Hermitage, which came from the collection of Abate Filippo Farsetti in Venice, who possessed several of Maderno's terracottas, a form in which Maderno specialized. Tsar Paul I of Russia began acquiring Farsetti's collection in 1800, and the transfer to Saint Petersburg was completed in 1805 by Tsar Alexander I . One of the Hermitage terracottas is a suggested restoration of the Laocoön, the correct restoration of which was a classic puzzle for 16th- and 17th-century virtuosi— another a variation on the Farnese Hercules, and yet another a remarkable Pietà (c. 1605), where Nicodemus holds the dead Christ in his lap, a conscious response to Michelangelo's Pietà

Further terracottas are in the collection at the Ca' d'Oro, Venice.

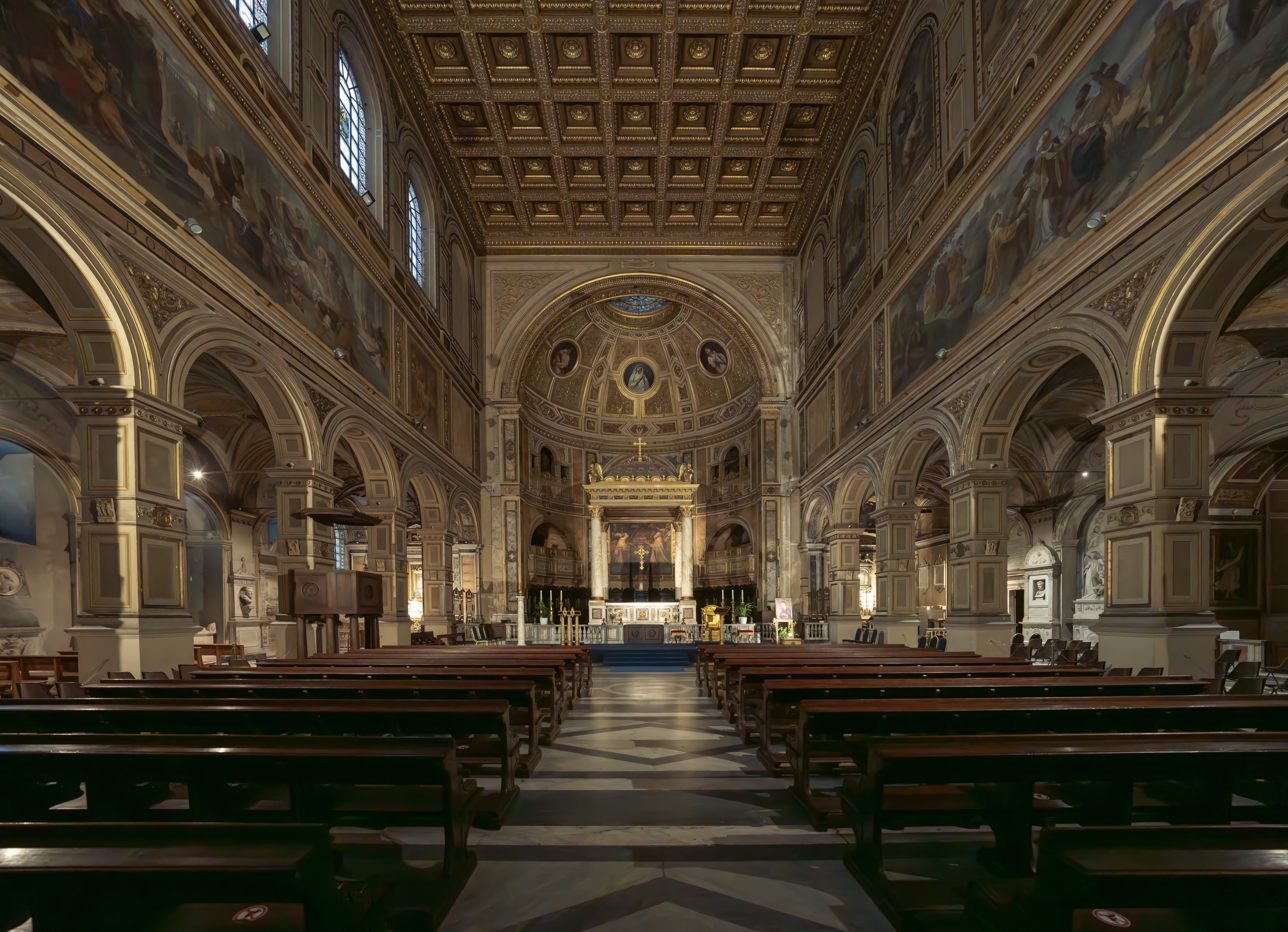
St. Carlo Borromeo (right), Church of San Lorenzo in Damaso, Rome, Italy.

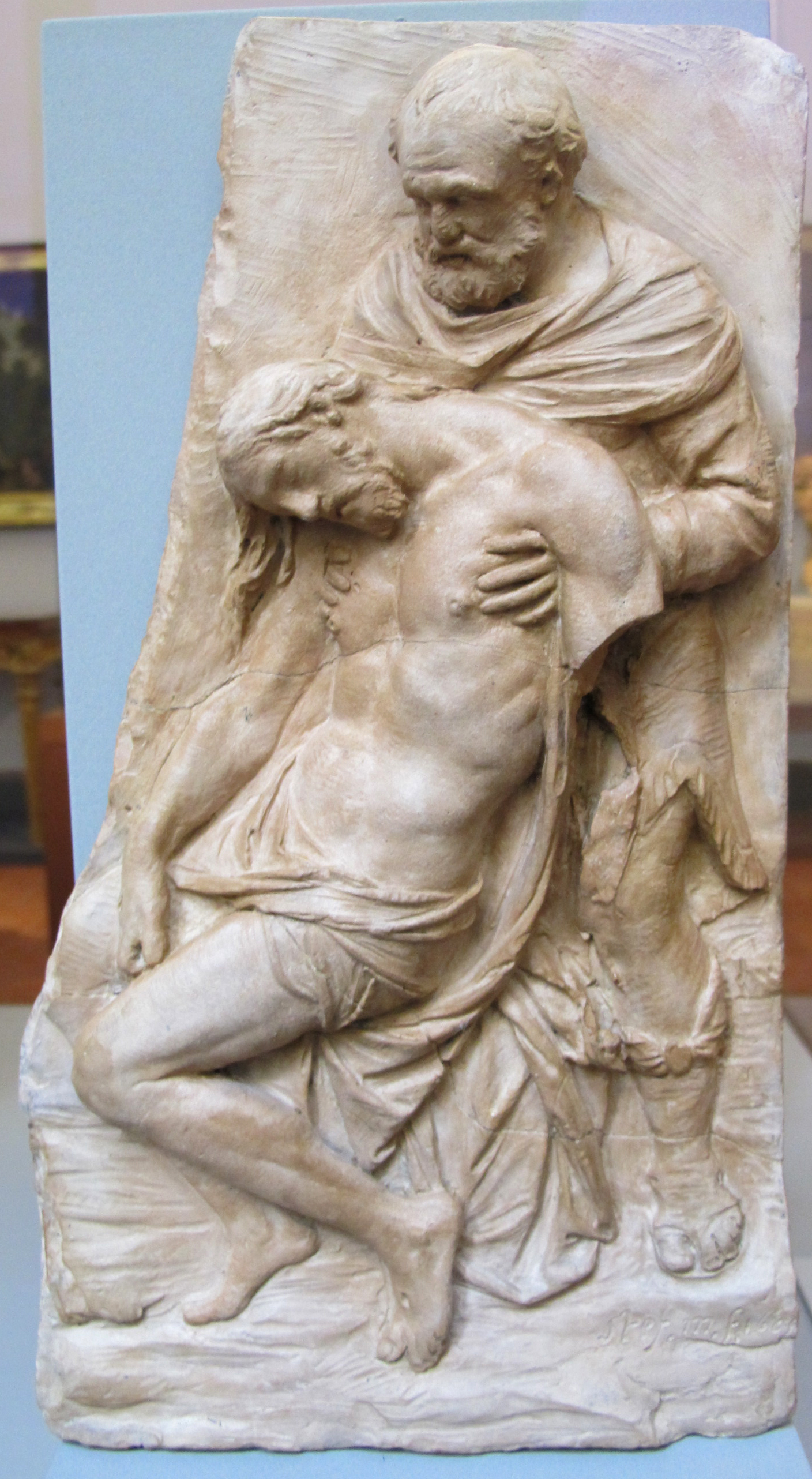
Pietà (c. 1605), Bode-Museum, Berlin, Germany.

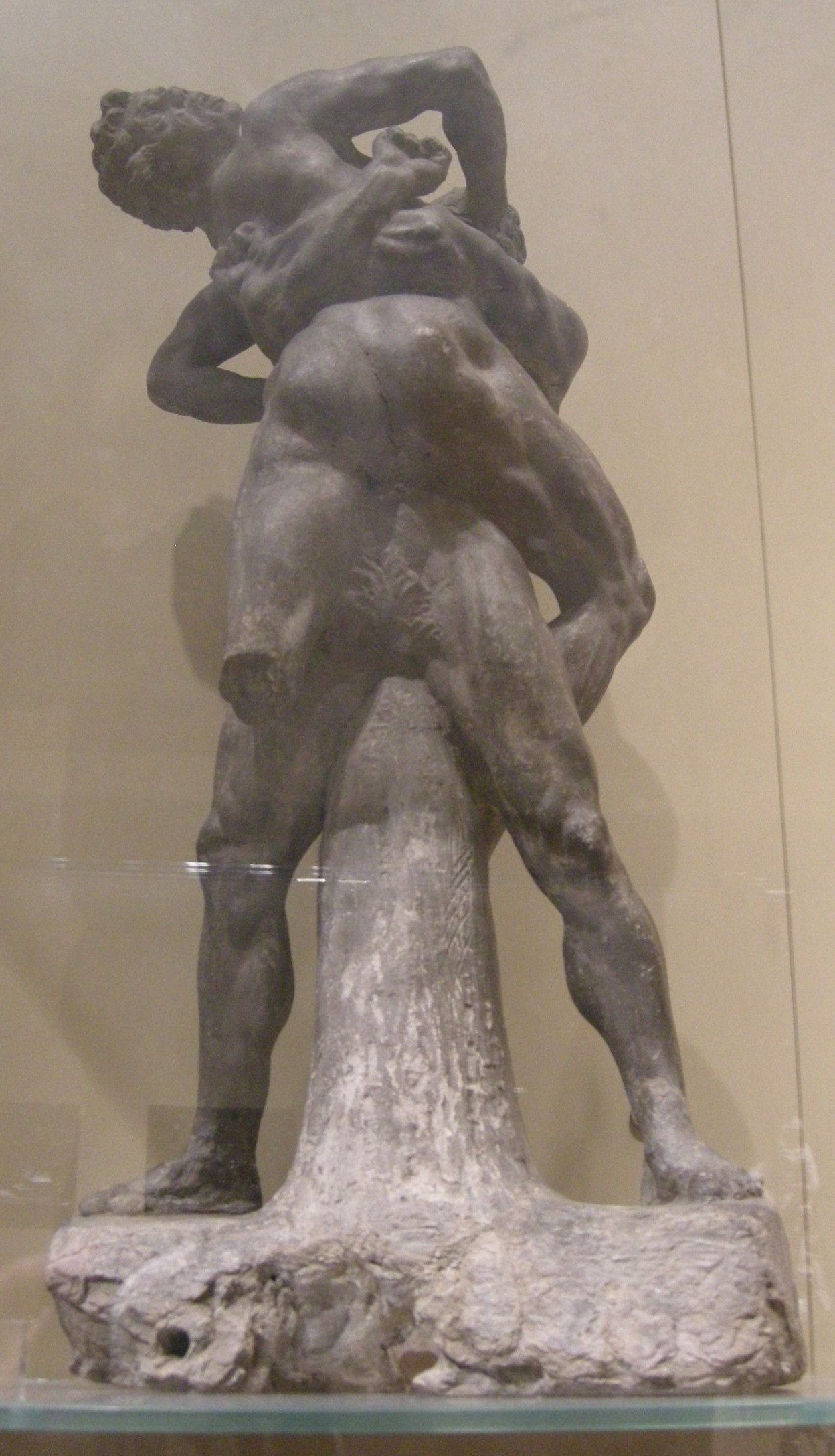
Hercules and Antaeus (c. 1622), terra-cotta, Victoria and Albert Museum, London, Great Britain.

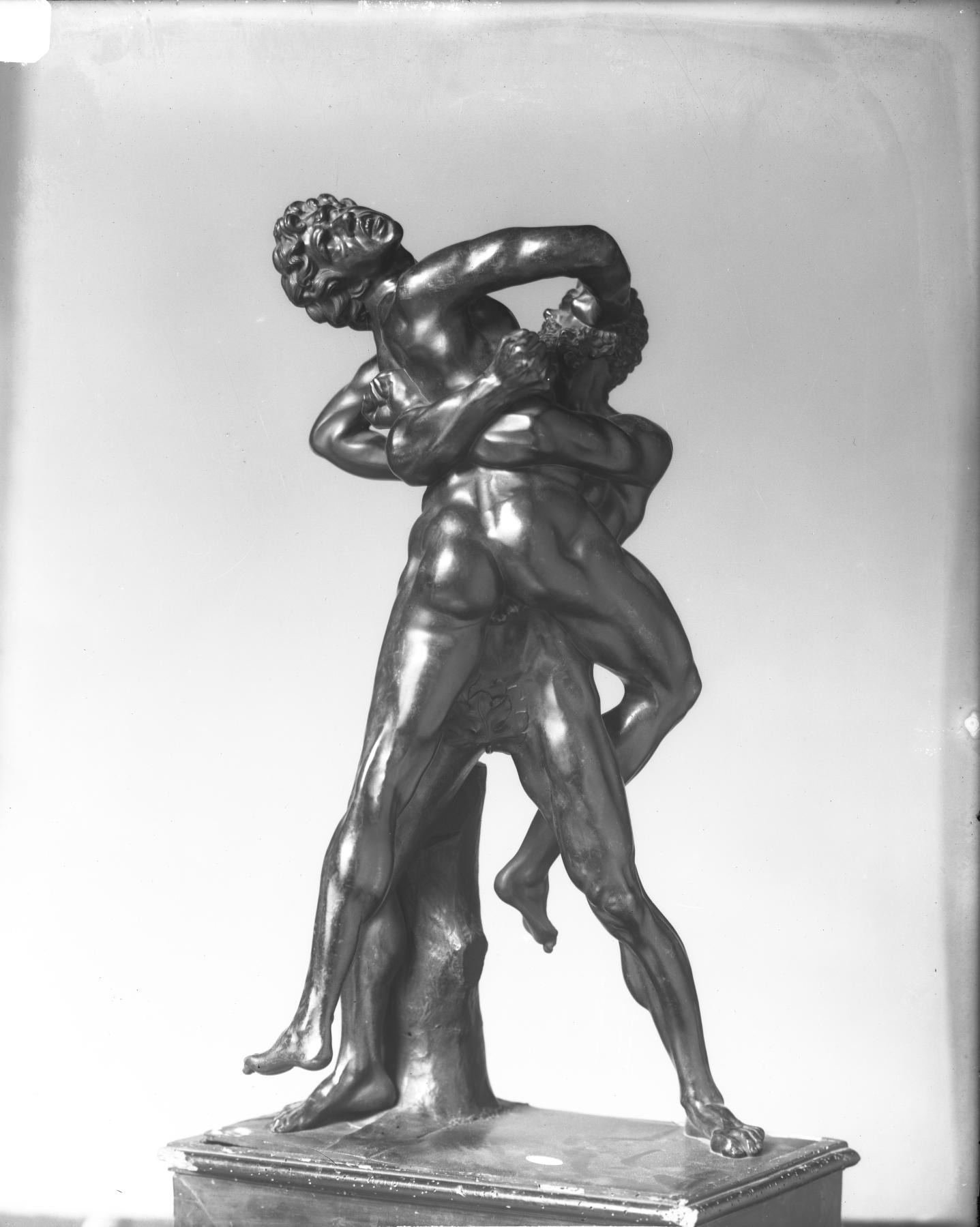
Hercules and Antaeus (c. 1622–25), bronze, Walters Art Museum, Baltimore, Maryland, United States.

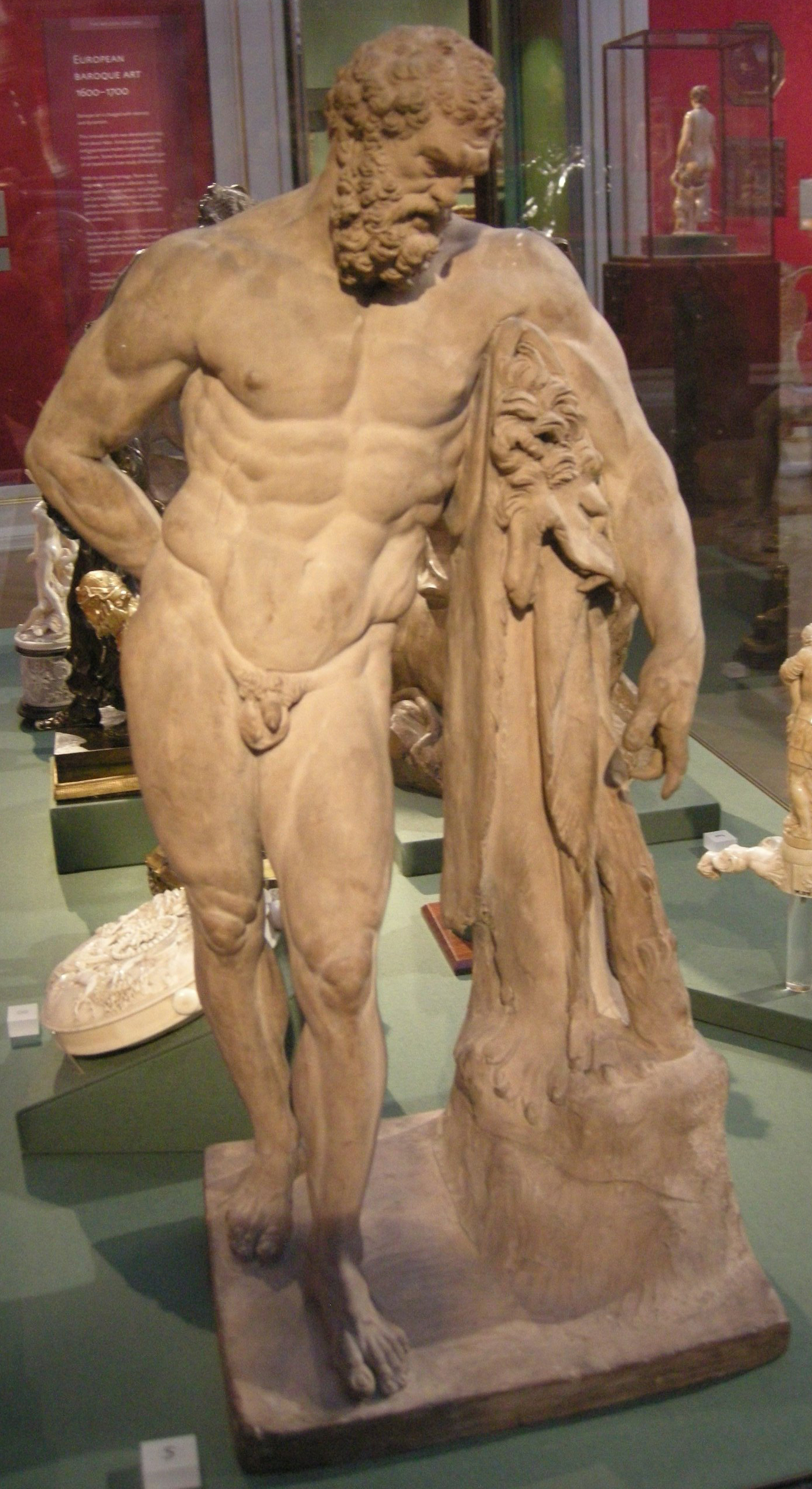
Hercules, terra-cotta, Hermitage Museum, Saint Petersburg, Russia.

== Sources ==
- A. Donati, Stefano Maderno, scultore (1576-1636), Bellinzona, 1945.
