= Michele Mazzarino =

Italian Cardinal and statesman (1605–1648)

His Eminence Michele Mazzarino O.P.
- Cardinal, Archbishop of Aix
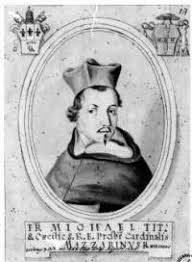
- Church: Roman Catholic Church
- Archdiocese: Aix
- Appointed: 10 July 1645
- Term ended: 31 August 1648
- Other post: Cardinal-Priest of S. Cecilia

Orders
- Ordination: 1628
- Consecration: 23 July 1645 by Girolamo Grimaldi-Cavalleroni
- Created cardinal: 7 October 1647 by Innocent X
- Rank: Cardinal-Priest

Personal details
- Born: Alessandro Mazzarino; 1 September 1605 Pescina, Kingdom of Naples
- Died: 31 August 1648 (aged 42) Rome, Papal States
- Buried: Santa Maria sopra Minerva

Michele Mazzarino, or Mazzarini, also known as Michel Mazarin, (1 September 1605 – 31 August 1648) was an Italian Cardinal and statesman in the service of France.

== Early life ==
Mazzarino was born in Pescina, Italy, then part of the Kingdom of Naples, but was raised in Rome. His baptismal name was Alessandro. His father was Pietro Mazzarini, and his mother was Ortensia Buffalini, a woman of a noble family of Città di Castello in Umbria, and a god-daughter of Filippo I Colonna, the Grand Constable of Naples. He was one of six children, the oldest of whom, Giulio Mazzarino, would become a Cardinal and chief minister under Louis XIV of France, under the new name of Cardinal Mazarin.

Mazzarino entered the Dominican Order at the convent of Santa Maria sopra Minerva in Rome in 1620, at the age of fifteen, and took the new name of Michele in honor of his grand-uncle Cardinal Michele Bonelli. In 1624 he was sent to complete his studies at the studia of the Order in Viterbo and Bologna, where he studied theology with Tommaso Turco.

== Ecclesiastic career ==
Mazzarino was ordained a priest in 1628. After his ordination, he taught theology at the College of Saint Thomas, the future Pontifical University of Saint Thomas Aquinas, Angelicum in Rome. Mazzarino became provincial of the Dominican Order in Apulia in 1635. In 1637 the Master General of the Order of Preachers, Niccolò Ridolfi, appointed Mazzarino as Vicar of the Province of Rome, and in April 1638 he was elected as Provincial.

In 1642 Mazzarino was appointed Master of the Sacred Palace under Pope Urban VIII. At the suggestion of his brother Cardinal Mazarin, he was made Archbishop of Aix-en-Provence in 1645 by Pope Innocent X. In October 1647 he was elevated to cardinal and in December of the same year was named cardinal-priest of Santa Cecilia in Trastevere. In January 1648 he was appointed Viceroy of Catalonia and went to Barcelona, but fell ill and was forced to leave without formally taking up the post. He returned to Rome as ambassador to the Holy See for France, but died the following month, on 31 August 1648.

== Legacy ==
Mazzarino was the promoter of the "Mazarin district" in Aix-en-Provence located south of the Cours Mirabeau.
