= Santa Cecilia in Trastevere =

Roman Catholic basilica, a landmark of Rome, Italy

Santa Cecilia
- Sancta Cecilia (in Latin)
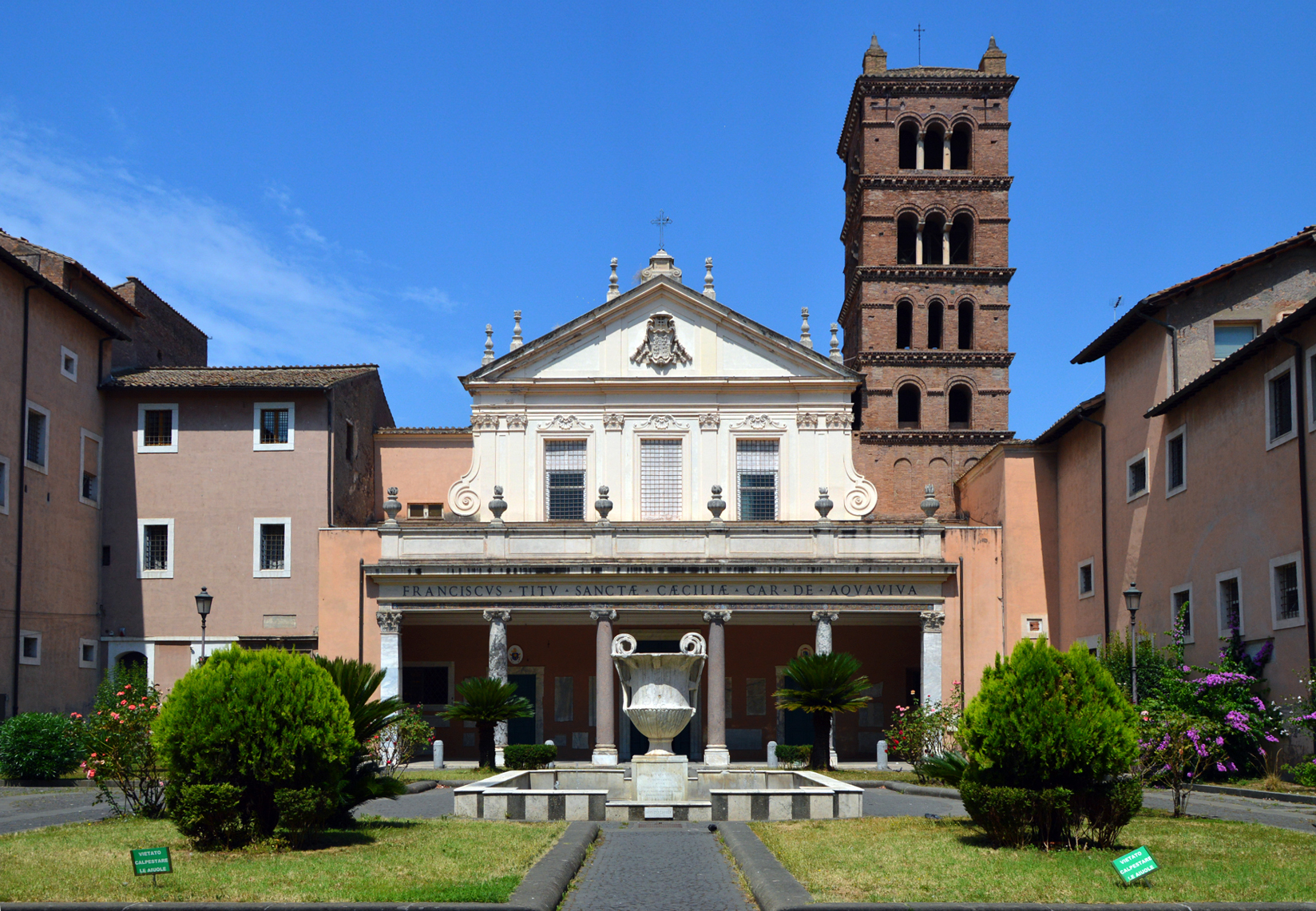
- Façade of Santa Cecilia, a 1725 project by Ferdinando Fuga, with the 12th-century belltower
- Click on the map for a fullscreen view
- 41°53′15.2″N 12°28′33.21″E
- Location: Piazza di Santa Cecilia, Rome
- Country: Italy
- Denomination: Roman Catholic
- Tradition: Latin Church
- Religious order: Benedictine (nuns)

History
- Status: Titular church
- Dedication: Saint Cecilia

Architecture
- Architectural type: Church
- Style: Baroque
- Groundbreaking: 5th century

Administration
- Province: Diocese of Rome

Santa Cecilia in Trastevere (Italian: Basilica di Santa Cecilia in Trastevere) is a titular church and minor basilica located in Trastevere, Rome. Dedicated to Saint Cecilia, the patron saint of music, it has served as a cardinal titular church since the 5th century. The present basilica, rebuilt under Pope Paschal I in the 9th century, is notable for its apse mosaic, frescoes by Pietro Cavallini, Baroque sculpture, and the revered relics of Saint Cecilia preserved beneath the high altar. Today, it remains the conventual church for the adjacent Benedictine abbey, and the feast of Saint Cecilia on 22 November continues to draw pilgrims, choirs, and musicians from around the world.

== History ==
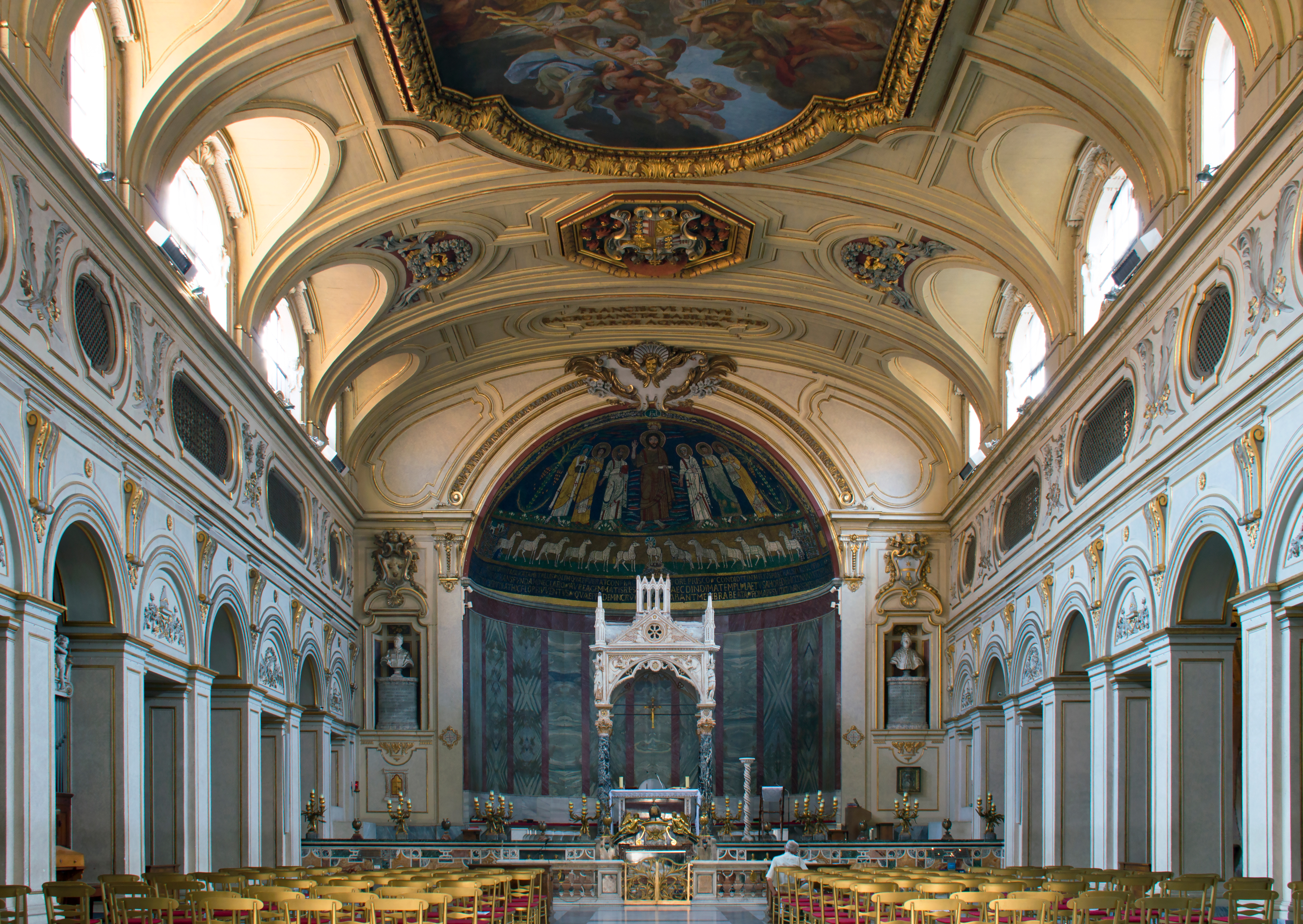
The nave and apse

=== Origins and early Christian period ===
The first church on this site was founded probably in the 3rd century, by Pope Urban I; it was devoted to the young Roman woman Cecilia, martyred it is said under Marcus Aurelius Severus Alexander (A.D. 222–235). Tradition holds that the church was built over the house of the saint. The baptistery associated with this church, together with the remains of a Roman house of the early Empire, was found during some excavations under the Chapel of the Relics. By the late fifth century, at the Synod of 499 of Pope Symmachus, the church is mentioned as the Titulus Ceciliae. On 22 November 545, Pope Vigilius was celebrating the feast of the saint in the church, when the emissary of Empress Theodora, Anthemius Scribo, captured him.

=== Late Antiquity and Early Middle Ages ===
Pope Paschal I rebuilt the church in 822, and moved here the relics of St. Cecilia from the Catacombs of St. Calixtus. More restorations followed in the 18th century.

The cardinal priest who is currently assigned to Santa Cecilia in Trastevere is Gualtiero Bassetti. His predecessors include Pope Stephen III, Pope Martin IV (1261–1281), Adam Easton (1383), Pope Innocent VIII (1474–1484), Thomas Wolsey (1515), Pope Gregory XIV (1585–1590), Michele Mazzarino (1647), Giuseppe Doria Pamphili (1785), Mariano Rampolla (1887–1913), and Carlo Maria Martini (d. 2012).

=== Renaissance and Baroque interventions ===
Since 1527, a community of Benedictine nuns has lived in the monastery next to Santa Cecilia, and has had charge of the basilica.

=== Modern period ===
The inscriptions found in Santa Cecilia, a valuable source illustrating the history of the church, have been collected and published by Vincenzo Forcella.

== Art and architecture ==
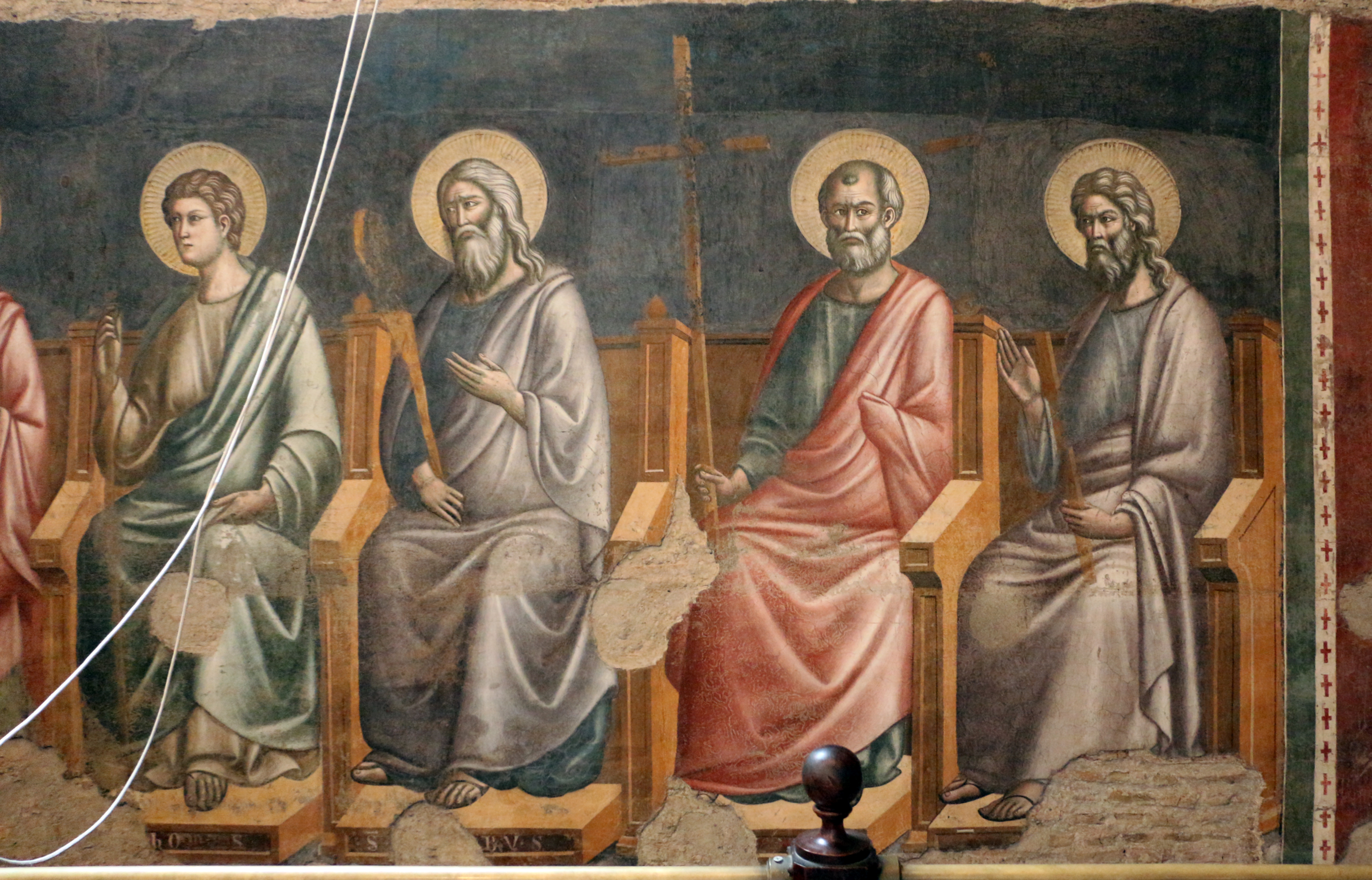
The Last Judgment (detail of the apostles), by Pietro Cavallini (1295–1300)

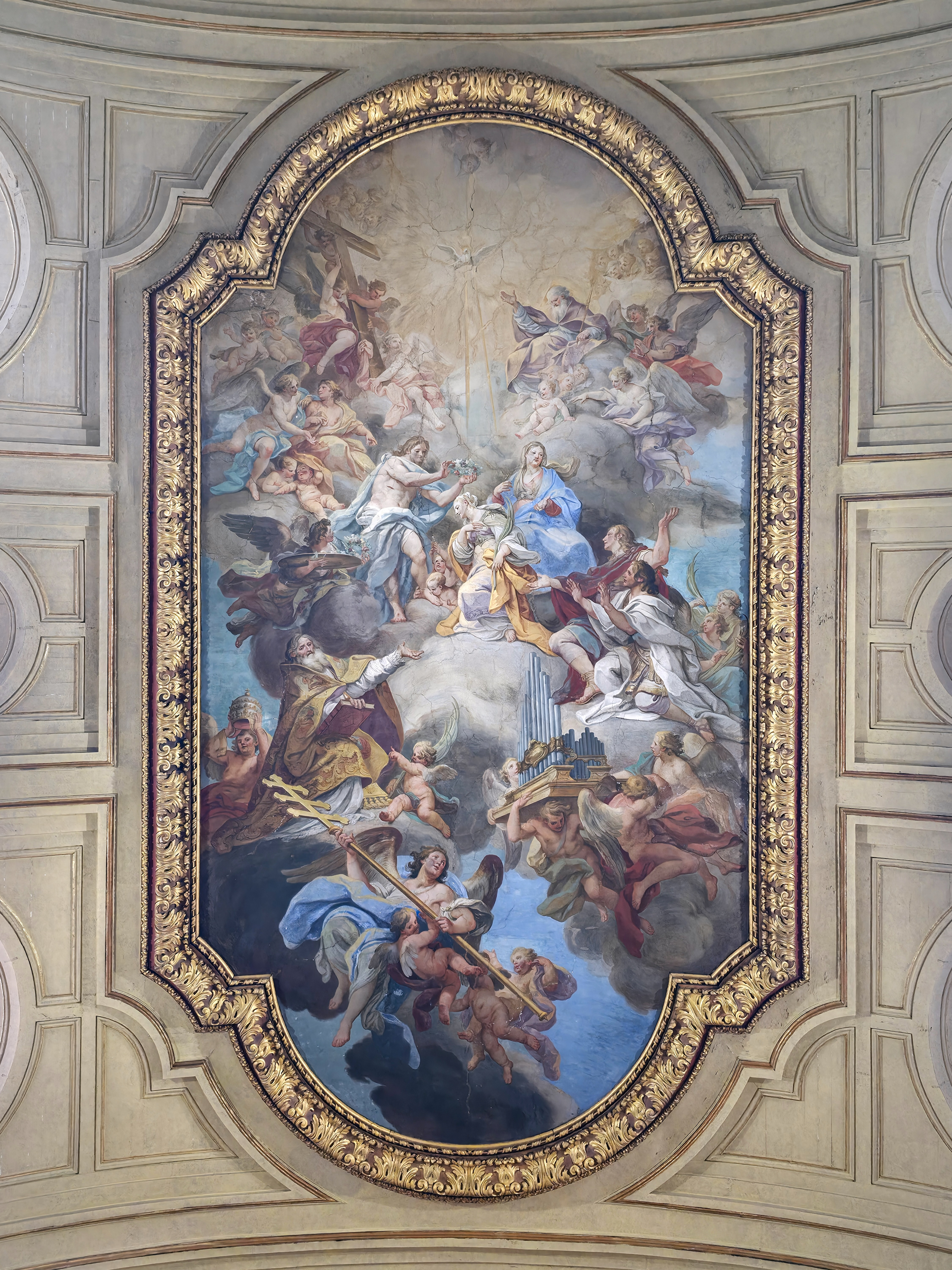
Nave ceiling

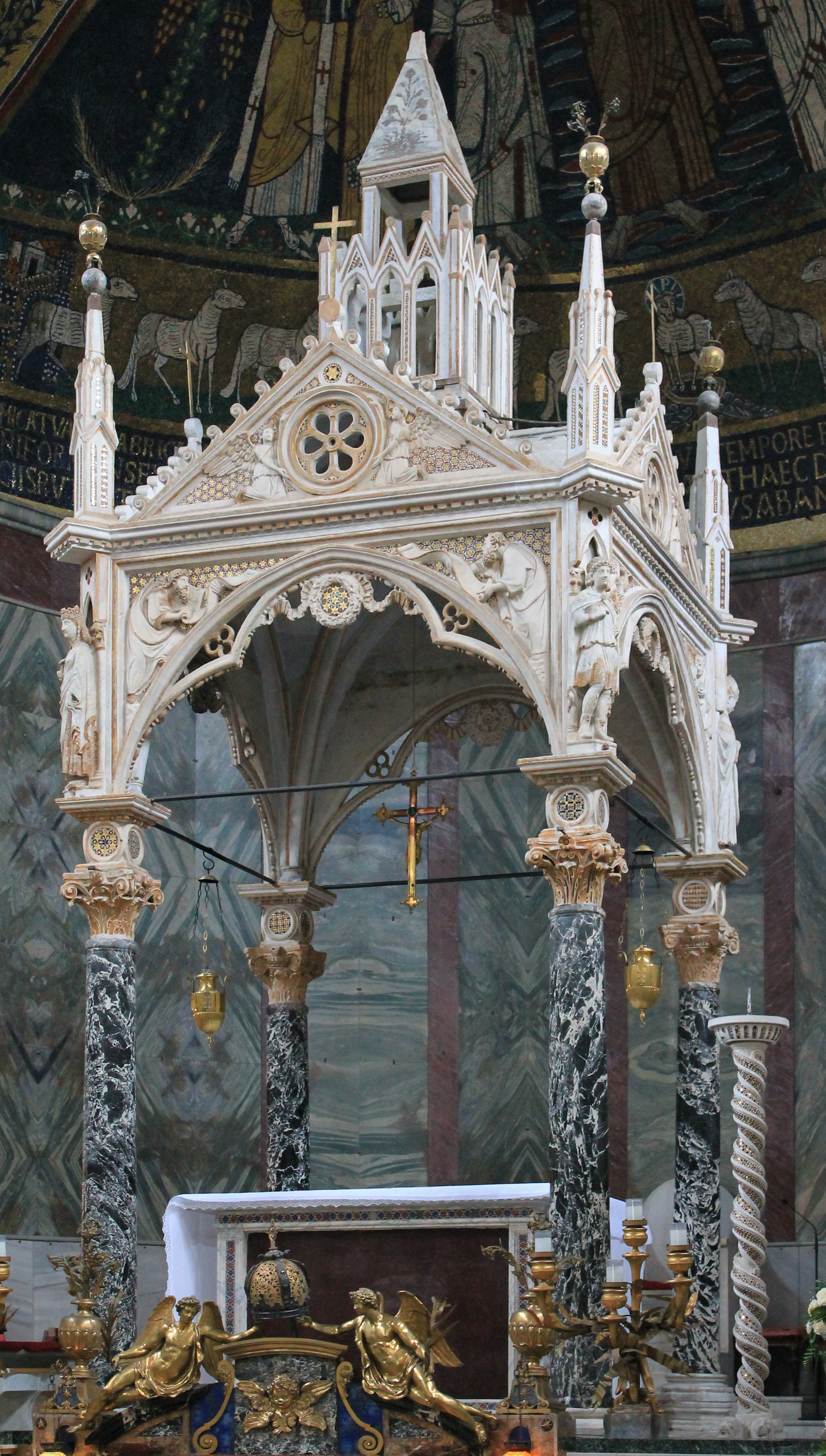
Ciborium attributed to Arnolfo di Cambio

The church has a façade built in 1725 by Ferdinando Fuga, which encloses a courtyard decorated with ancient mosaics, columns and a cantharus (water vessel). Its decoration includes the coat of arms and the dedication to the titular cardinal who paid for the facade, Francesco Cardinal Acquaviva d'Aragona.

Among the artifacts remaining from the 13th century edifice are a mural painting depicting the Last Judgment (1289–93) by Pietro Cavallini in the choir of the nuns, and the ciborium (1293) in the presbytery by Arnolfo di Cambio which is surrounded by four marble columns white and black, decorated with statuettes of angels, saints, prophets, and evangelists.

The Last Judgement fresco which remains today, covering the entire width of the west wall of the entrance, is likely part of a cycle of Old and New Testament scenes by Cavallini on the north and south nave walls, based on remaining fragments of an Annunciation scene and stories of the life of Jacob. The frescoes were plastered over in a remodeling under Cardinal Francesco Acquaviva in 1724, which included building an enclosed choir, the floor of which cuts off part of the Last Judgement. Rediscovered in 1900, the fresco may be viewed during limited weekday hours for a small euro fee paid to the Benedictine nuns of the church. Luigi Vanvitelli also did an altarpiece, Apparition of the Angel to St. Cecili, and a fresco, Angels Musicians, located in the Chapel of the Relics, just some of his few surviving paintings.

The apse has remains of 9th century mosaics depicting the Redeemer with Saints Paul, Cecilia, Paschal I, Peter, Valerian, and Agatha.

The ceiling of Cappella dei Ponziani was decorated God the Father with Evangelists (1470) by Antonio del Massaro (Antonio da Viterbo or il Pastura). The Cappella delle Reliquie was frescoed and provided with an altarpiece by Luigi Vanvitelli. The nave is frescoed with the Apotheosis of Santa Cecilia (1727) by Sebastiano Conca. The church contains two altarpieces by Guido Reni: Saints Valerian and Cecilia and a Decapitation of Saint Cecilia (1603).

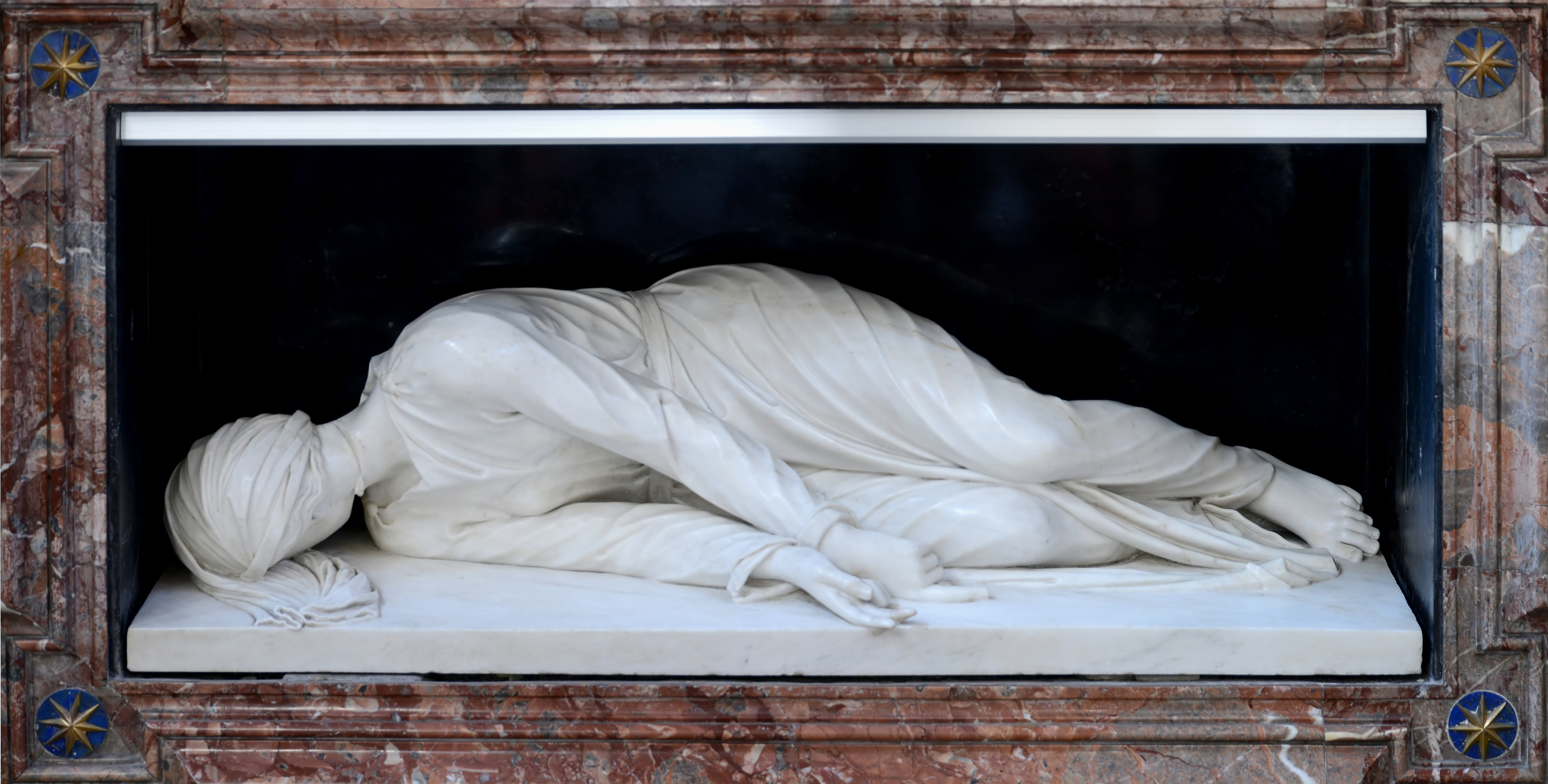
Saint Cecilia, by Stefano Maderno

Under the ciborium of Arnolfo di Cambio that shelters the main altar is a glass case enclosing the white marble sculpture of St. Cecilia (1600) by the late-Renaissance sculptor Stefano Maderno. A marble slab in the pavement in front of the case quotes Maderno's sworn statement that he has recorded the body as he saw it when the tomb was opened in 1599. The statue depicts the three axe strokes described in the 5th-century account of her martyrdom. It also underscores the incorruptibility of her cadaver (an attribute of some saints), which miraculously still had congealed blood after centuries. This statue could be conceived as proto-Baroque, since it depicts no idealized moment or person, but a theatric scene, a naturalistic representation of a dead or dying saint. It is striking because it precedes by decades the similar high-Baroque sculptures by Gian Lorenzo Bernini (for example, his Blessed Ludovica Albertoni) and Melchiorre Cafà (Santa Rosa de Lima).

The crypt is decorated in cosmatesque style, and contains the relics of St. Cecilia and her husband St. Valerian. In the apse of the crypt are the remains of an altar whose inscription indicates that it was dedicated by Pope Gregory VII (1073–1085) on 3 June 1080.

== List of cardinal-priests ==
List of cardinal-priests at Santa Cecilia in Trastevere since 761
| Picture | Name | Dates | Notes |
|---|---|---|---|
| | Stefano | 761 – 768 | Elected Pope Stephen III |
| | Desiderio | 6 March 1059 – 24 May 1086 | Elected Pope Victor III |
| | Octaviano de' Monticelli | 2 March 1151 – ? | Elected antipope Victor IV |
| | Pelagio Galvani | 1210 – 1212 | Appointed Bishop of Albano |
| | Simon de Brion | 17 December 1261 – 22 February 1281 | Elected Pope Martin IV |
| | Jean Cholet | 12 April 1281 – 2 August 1293 | Died |
| | Tommaso d'Ocre | 18 September 1294 – 29 May 1300 | Died |
| | Guillaume de Pierre Godin | 23 December 1312 – 4 June 1336 | Died |
| | Guy de Boulogne | 20 September 1342 – 25 November 1373 | |
| | Bertrand Lagier | 1375 – 8 November 1392 | Died |
| | Bonaventura Badoaro de Peraga | 18 September 1378 – 10 July 1381 | Died |
| | Giovanni Stefaneschi | 1385 – 1388 | Died |
| | Adam Easton | 18 December 1389 – 15 August 1398 | Died |
| | Guillaume de Vergy | 1393 – 1407 | Died |
| | Antonio Caetani | 27 February 1402 – 12 June 1405 | Appointed Bishop of Palestrina |
| | Antoine de Challant | 19 March 1412 – 4 September 1418 | Died |
| | Pedro Fernández de Frías | 26 June 1419 – 19 September 1420 | Died |
| | Louis Aleman | 27 May 1426 – 16 October 1450 | Died |
| | Rinaldo Piscicello | 21 March 1457 – 4 July 1457 | Died |
| | Niccolò Fortiguerra | 19 March 1460 – 21 December 1473 | Died |
| | Giovanni Battista Cibo | January 1474 – 29 August 1484 | Elected Pope Innocent VIII |
| | Giovanni Giacomo Sclafenati | 17 November 1484 – 8 December 1497 | Died |
| | Lorenzo Cybo de Mari | 9 December 1497 – September 1500 | Resigned |
| | Francisco de Borja | 5 October 1500 – 11 August 1506 | Translated to Santi Nereo e Achilleo |
| | Francesco Alidosi | 11 August 1506 – 24 May 1511 | Died |
| | Carlo Domenico del Carretto | June 1513 – 15 August 1514 | Died |
| | Thomas Wolsey | 10 September 1515 – 29 November 1530 | Died |
| | Gabriel de Gramont | 9 January 1531 – 26 March 1534 | Died |
| | Francesco Cornaro | 27 April 1534 – 5 September 1534 | Translated to San Ciriaco alle Terme Diocleziane |
| | Jean du Bellay | 31 May 1535 – 26 October 1547 | Translated to San Pietro in Vincoli |
| | Charles de Lorraine | 4 November 1547 – 11 December 1555 | Translated to Sant'Apollinare |
| | Robert de Lénoncourt | 11 December 1555 – 13 March 1560 | Appointed Bishop of Sabina |
| | Alfonso Gesualdo | 10 March 1561 – 17 October 1572 | Translated to Santa Prisca |
| | Niccolò Sfondrati | 14 January 1585 – 5 December 1590 | Elected Pope Gregory XIV |
| | Paolo Emilio Sfondrati | 14 January 1591 – 14 February 1618 | Died |
| | Giambattista Leni | 5 March 1618 – 3 November 1627 | Died |
| | Federico Baldissera Bartolomeo Cornaro | 15 November 1627 – 26 April 1629 | Translated to San Marco |
| | Giandomenico Spinola | 30 April 1629 – 11 August 1646 | Died |
| | Michele Mazzarino | 16 December 1647 – 31 August 1648 | Died |
| | Gaspare Mattei | 28 September 1648 – 9 April 1650 | Died |
| | Francesco Angelo Rapaccioli | 21 November 1650 – 16 May 1657 | Died |
| | Ottavio Acquaviva d'Aragona | 18 March 1658 – 26 September 1674 | Died |
| | Philip Thomas Howard | 23 March 1676 – 25 September 1679 | Translated to Santa Maria sopra Minerva |
| | Giambattista Spinola | 22 September 1681 – 20 February 1696 | Translated to Sant' Agnese fuori le mura |
| | Celestino Sfondrati | 20 February 1696 – 4 September 1696 | Died |
| | Giacomo Antonio Morigia | 11 April 1699 – 8 Obctober 1708 | Died |
| | Francesco Acqaviva | 28 January 1709 – 9 January 1725 | Died |
| | Filippo Antonio Gualtieri | 29 January 1724 – 31 July 1726 | Translated to Santa Prassede |
| | Cornelio Bentivoglio | 25 June 1727 – 30 December 1732 | Died |
| | Troiano Acquaviva d'Aragona | 19 January 1733 – 20 March 1747 | Died |
| | Joaquín Fernández de Portocarrero y Mendoza | 10 April 1474 – 22 June 1760 | Died |
| | Giorgio Doria | 3 January 1757 – 31 January 1759 | Died |
| | Cosimo Imperiali | 12 February 1759 – 13 October 1764 | Died |
| | Giuseppe Maria Feroni | 17 December 1764 – 15 November 1767 | Died |
| | Ferninando Maria de Rossi | 14 December 1767 – 4 February 1775 | Died |
| | Girolamo Spínola | 13 March 1775 – 22 July 1784 | Died |
| | Hyacinthe Sigismond Gerdil | 20 September 1784 – 12 August 1802 | Died |
| | Giuseppe Doria Pamphilj | 20 March 1802 – 10 February 1816 | Died |
| | Giorgio Doria Pamphilj Landi | 16 March 1818 – 16 November 1837 | Died |
| | Giacomo Luigi Brignole | 13 September 1838 – 21 February 1853 | Died |
| | Giovanni Brunelli | 22 December 1853 – 21 February 1861 | Died |
| | Karl-August von Reisach | 27 September 1861 – 22 June 1868 | Appointed Bishop of Sabina |
| | Innocenzo Ferrieri | 24 September 1868 – 13 January 1887 | Died |
| | Mariano Rampolla | 26 May 1887 – 16 December 1913 | Died |
| | Domenico Serafini | 28 May 1914 – 5 March 1918 | Died |
| | Augusto Silj | 18 December 1919 – 27 February 1926 | Died |
| | Bonaventura Cerretti | 24 June 1926 – 13 March 1933 | Appointed Bishop of Frascati |
| | Francesco Marmaggi | 18 June 1936 – 3 November 1949 | Died |
| | Gaetano Cicognani | 29 October 1953 – 14 December 1959 | Appointed Bishop of Frascati |
| | Albert Gregory Meyer | 17 December 1959 – 9 April 1965 | Died |
| | John Cody | 29 June 1967 – 25 April 1982 | Died |
| | Carlo Maria Martini | 2 February 1983 – 31 August 2012 | Died |
| | Gualtiero Bassetti | 22 February 2014 – today | Current cardinal-priest |

== Sources ==
- Jacobus Laderchius, S. Cæciliæ virg. et mart. acta et Transtyberina basilica, 2 vols., Pagliarini, Rome 1723).
- Vincenzo Forcella, Inscrizioni delle chiese di Roma, Roma 1873, pp. 17–46. (The inscriptions found in the church)
- Bertha Ellen Lovewell, The Life of St. Cecilia, Lamson, Wolffe and Company, Boston-New York-London 1898.
- Torquato Picarelli, Basilica e casa romana di Santa Cecilia in Trastevere, Romana, Rome 1904.
- Torquato Piccarelli, Monografia storica anecdotica della chiesa, cripta, e casa di S. Cecilia in Trastevere, Rome 1922.
- Hüls, Rudolf, Kardinal, Klerus und Kirchen Roms: 1049–1130, Max Niemeyer, Tübingen 1977 (in German).
- Neda Parmegiani and Alberto Pronti, Il complesso di S. Cecilia in Trastevere (Roma : Sydaco Editrice, 1997).
- Anna Maria Panzera, The Basilica of Santa Cecilia in Trastevere, Nuove Edizioni Romane, Rome 2001.
- Valentina Oliva, La basilica di Santa Cecilia (Edizioni d'arte Marconi, No. 73), Marconi arti grafiche, Genoa 2004.

| Preceded by San Carlo al Corso | Landmarks of Rome; Santa Cecilia in Trastevere | Succeeded by Santi Celso e Giuliano |
