= Adam Easton =

14th-century English cardinal

Adam Easton O.S.B.
- Cardinal-Priest of Santa Cecilia
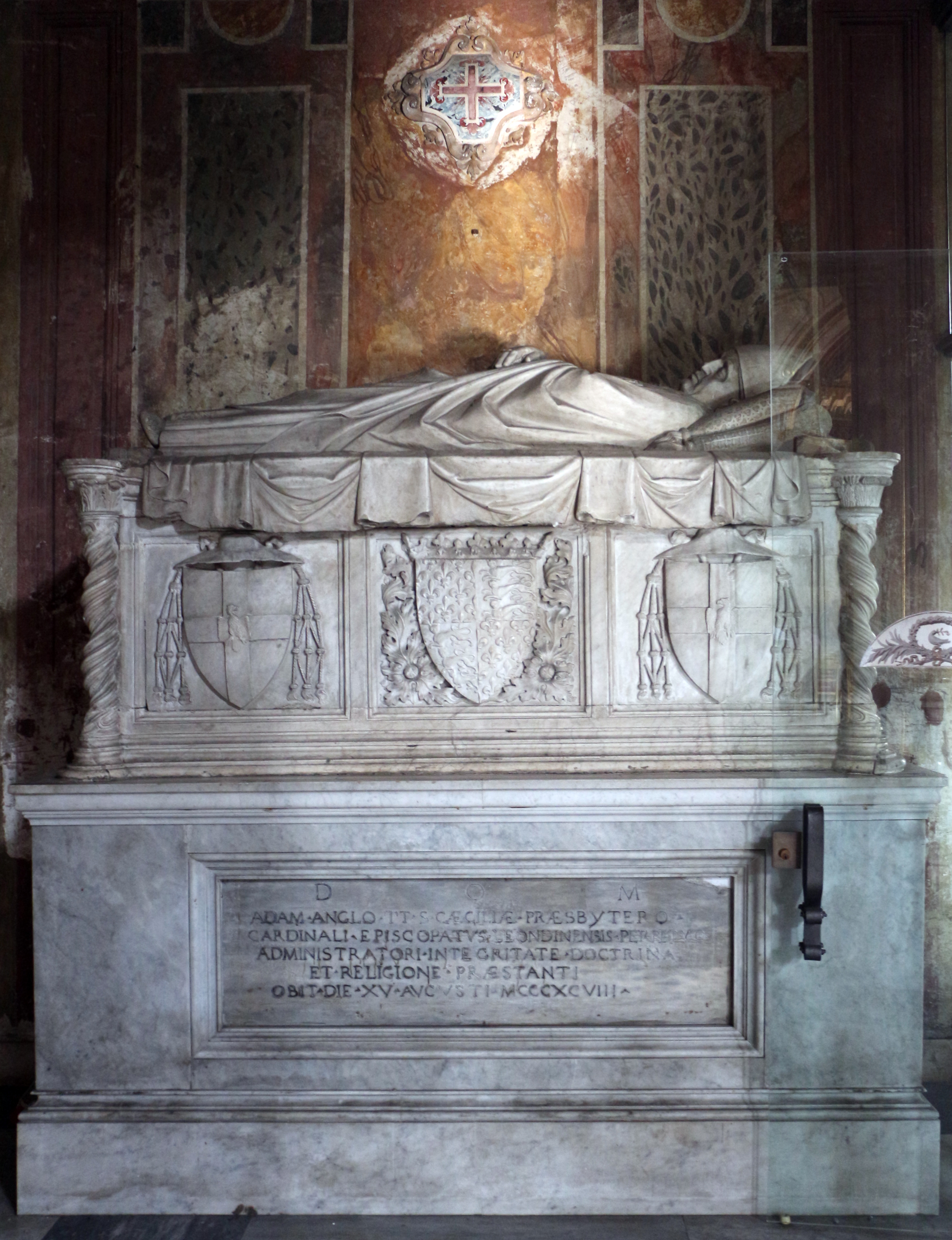
- Tomb monument in Santa Cecila in Trastevere (15th century)
- Church: Roman Catholic Church
- Appointed: 18 December 1389
- Term ended: 15 September 1397
- Other post: Dean of York (1382–1385)

Orders
- Created cardinal: 21 December 1381 by Pope Urban VI
- Rank: Cardinal-priest

Personal details
- Born: c. 1328/1338 Easton, Norfolk, England.
- Died: 15 September 1397 Rome, Papal States
- Buried: Church of Santa Cecilia in Trastevere, Rome
- Education: Gloucester College, Oxford

Adam Easton (c. 1328/1338 – 15 September 1397) was an English cardinal, born at Easton in Norfolk.

== Biography ==
Easton joined the Benedictines at Norwich moving on to the Benedictine Gloucester College, Oxford where he became one of the most outstanding students of his generation, being especially proficient in Hebrew. He is known to have accompanied Simon Langham to Rome, then Montefiascone and Avignon and he held the post of socius in Langham's household. Being a man of learning and ability, he obtained a post in the Curia.

He was instrumental in the attack and subsequent condemnation of John Wycliff and supporting Catholic orthodoxy in England. He was made a Cardinal by Urban VI, on 21 September 1381. On 7 March 1381 or 1382, he was nominated Dean of York. He arranged Richard II and Anne of Bohemia's wedding coronation in Westminster Abbey and probably composed the Liber Regalis. A document in the Abbey concerning the coronation offerings gives him as Cardinal of Santa Cecilia in Trastevere. In 1385 he was imprisoned at Nocera in Campania by Urban on a charge of conspiring with five other cardinals against the pope and was deprived of his cardinalate and deanery. With his fellow captives he was dragged across Italy arriving at Genoa in autumn 1385. Here the others were put to death but Adam was spared through the personal intervention of Richard II.

The next pope, Boniface IX, restored his cardinalate on 18 December 1389. It has been suggested that for a time Easton returned to England. The Norwich Record Office documents the sending of the Cardinal's books by way of the Low Countries to Norwich for his use there. He retained benefices in England throughout this period, including Somersham, the deanery of York. In April 1392 Easton was admitted, with a papal endorsement of the exchange, as rector of Hitcham, Suffolk, in return for which he surrendered the prebend of Yetminster Secunda in Salisbury cathedral to John of Ilkilington.

He wrote many works the most significant of which was a massive volume entitled the Defence of Ecclesiastical Power, of which only the prologue and first book survive. In it he defended the church's authority against the state, apparently attacking the views of Marsilius of Padua, John of Jandun and William of Occam and by implication, also refuting Wyclif's theology as false and erroneous. He was always courteous to his opponents, referring to them as 'men of great learning and abundance of sanctity'. A number of his other works still exist, as do some of the manuscripts of his library, which were shipped back to Norwich from Rome in six barrels, and he composed the Office for the Visitation of Our Lady. He also laboured for the canonisation of Birgitta of Sweden in 1391 with a structured refutation of a Perugian 'Devil's Advocate', in a document in which he defended women's visionary writings.

He may have been Julian of Norwich's spiritual director, editing her Long Text Showing of Love in the same way that Birgitta of Sweden's spiritual director, Alfonso of Jaen, edited her Revelationes. Alfonso became director to Catherine of Siena, whose confessor and executor was William Flete, the Cambridge-educated Augustinian Hermit of Lecceto, and to Chiara Gambacorta. Easton's Defense of St Birgitta echoes Alfonso of Jaen's Epistola Solitarii, and William Flete's Remedies against Temptations, all of which appear in Julian's text.

He died at Rome on 15 September (or, according to other sources, 20 October) 1397. His tomb, constructed later, is in his Cardinalate Basilica of Santa Cecilia in Trastevere.
