= Italian Baroque =

Stylistic period in Italian history

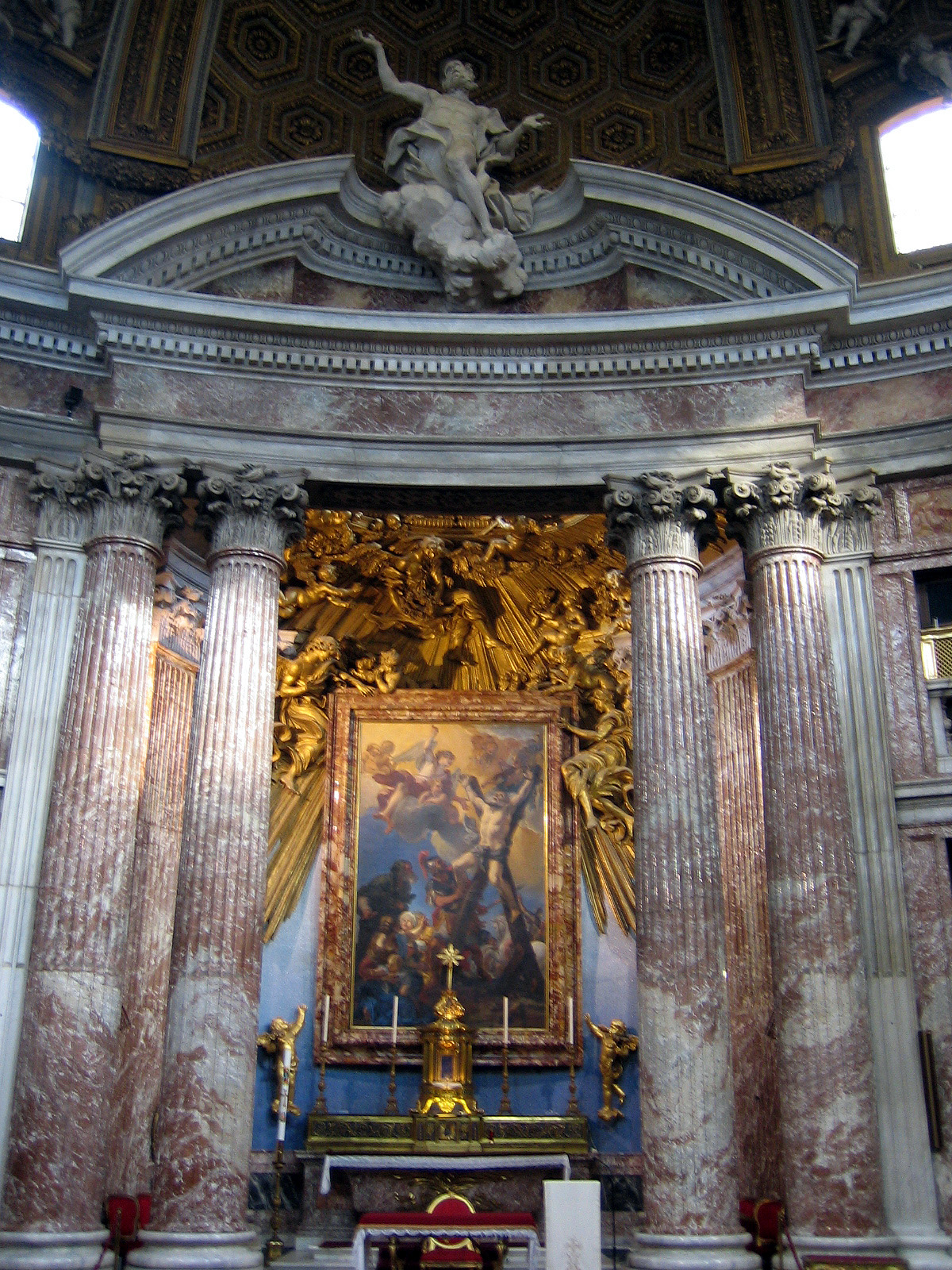
The Church of Sant'Andrea al Quirinale, designed by Gian Lorenzo Bernini.

Italian Baroque (or Barocco) is a stylistic period in Italian history and art that spanned from the late 16th century to the early 18th century.

== History ==
The early 17th century marked a time of change for those of the Roman Catholic religion, a symbolization of their strength as a congregation and the intelligence of their creative minds. In response to the Protestant Reformation of the earlier 16th century, Roman Catholics embarked on a program of restoration, a new way of living that became known as the Counter Reformation. The purpose of the Counter Reformation was aimed at remedying some of the abuses challenged by the Protestants earlier in the century. Within the church, a renewed Catholic culture was imposed on Italian society. It started with the Council of Trent, imposed by Pope Paul III, a commission of cardinals who came together to address issues of the Catholic Church and regain faith among worshipers. This resulted in guidelines established by the Church for the commissioning of work by artists to communicate biblical truths and ideals.

== Secular construction ==
New secular construction resulted from the establishment of pioneering religious orders. Between 1524 and 1575, the Barnabite, Jesuit, Oratory of Saint Philip Neri, and Theatine orders came into being, and as their influence spread, more and more new churches began being built. By 1725, there were 323 churches in Rome alone, serving a permanent population of fewer than 150,000 people. Because of this rapid growth in church building, it became the responsibility of these religious orders to spread the word of Catholicism to the population. Religious books were increasingly being printed in Venice for distribution to the clergy and literate worshipers, passed out during mass and offering continuous reminders of the presence of Christ in everyday life.

Churches had now become a place for encouragement- spaces of expansive beauty and decoration.

They provided exciting imagery that contrasted greatly with the iconoclastic inclinations of the Protestant Reformation led by Martin Luther.

The Roman Church realized the power that art could have to inspire and, therefore, they became preoccupied with extravagance and display. They intended to overwhelm viewers, catch their attention, and make them want to see more. Entering a Baroque church where visual space, music and ceremony were combined was a powerful device for securing the loyalty of congregations. The bigger and more beautiful the space, the more people wanted to go. Complex geometry, curving and intricate stairway arrangements and large-scale sculptural ornamentation offered a sense of movement and mystery within the space.

Il Gesù was the first of many Counter-Reformation churches built in Rome, serving as the mother church of the new Jesuit order. Designed by Giacomo Barozzi da Vignola, the church of Il Gesù soon became the prototype for the Baroque churches that the Jesuit order built or rebuilt during the Counter-Reformation era. The interior of the Gesu was a study of the grandeur that Roman classicism could offer when combined with simplicity in large scale. High windows puncture the nave's barrel vault, as a ring of windows in the drum of the dome brings beams of natural light into the interior, creating a dramatic contrast of light and darkness in relatively dim space.

The plan of Il Gesù became the standard for churches for years to come; a breakaway from the ideal central-plan church of the Renaissance into something new. The Latin Cross variation created a greater sense of spatial unification within the space. In his design for the church of Il Gesù, Vignola broadened the nave and made the transepts and side chapels smaller, creating a better and brighter focal point for the main space and allowing more room for the congregation at Mass. The cultural patronage of the pope in Rome was an extreme case of diversity in comparison with surrounding Italian city-states. The pope served his role not only as the head of the Catholic Church, but as the acting ruler for the city. He [the pope] controlled what was built and who was commissioned to build it.

In 1605, at the very beginning of his pontificate, Pope Paul V commissioned Carlo Maderno to redesign St. Peter's Basilica. It was at the age of 72, in 1546, when Michelangelo first took hold of the unfinished rebuilding project started by Bramante. When Michelangelo died, the construction of the then Greek-cross section surrounding the Papal altar and the tomb of Peter had been completed only as far as the top of the drum. The dome was then completed, with some modifications, by Giacomo della Porta in 1590. It was the continuous debates over the religious and aesthetic benefits of keeping the Greek-cross plan or enhancing the space by extending it into a Latin-cross plan that led Paul V to boldly commission Maderno's services. Maderno's initial projects, including the long nave addition, which created a new Latin-Cross solution upon the ground plan, the façade and the portico, became an instantly recognizable image of Rome and the heart and spirit of Catholic Christianity.

To solve the problem of excess open space within the updated basilica, Pope Urban VII commissioned Gian Lorenzo Bernini to design the internal space. Bernini became responsible for much of the internal appearance of the basilica, notably the baldacchino (1624–33) erected over the dome of St. Peter. It acts as a main focal point in the space, combining both sculpture and architecture into a unified art piece. Complex in form and ornate with sculpture, the baldacchino serves as a great example of the Baroque 'style', massive and ornate, glorifying the church and the Catholic religion.

This space is an example of quadratura, an attempt to create an illusion through architecture, painting, and sculpture. Painting and sculpture create an illusion of never-ending height and dramatic composition.

== Interiors ==
Pietro da Cortona was one of the painters of the 17th century who employed this illusionist way of painting. Among his most important commissions were the frescoes he painted for the Palace of the Barberini family. Pietro da Cortona's compositions were the largest decorative frescoes executed in Rome since the work of Michelangelo at the Sistine Chapel. Harold Osborne, author of The Oxford Companion of Art, comments on his work, the Divine Providence, completed for the Barberini palace:

This, his most famous painting, is a triumph of illusionism for the centre of the ceiling appears open to the sky and the figures seen from below appear to come down into the room as well as soar out of it.

Stucco became one of the overall key characteristics of Baroque interiors, enhancing wall spaces, niches, and ceilings.

It was the reverence for the church that provided funding for more and more building projects which, in turn, brought even more worshipers into the city –as many as five times the permanent population during a Holy Year. With this boom in tourism, a continuing job opportunity arose for the citizens of Rome. The construction industry in Rome soon became the largest employer in the city.

Throughout Italy, inspiring architects received training on-the-job. In most parts of Italy, local architects satisfied building needs, but in Rome, architects were specifically commissioned either by the Papal state or family dynasties to work on their projects. Families associated with the papacy, including the Barberini, Borghese, House of Chigi and Pamphili, were extremely well off and, in turn, some of the richest and grandest villas were constructed for them. Competition between these ruling families meant they rivaled each other in the elaborateness of the detailing in their homes as well as in the churches they supported.

The hot climate of Italy influenced the choosing of materials and planning of architecture. For flooring, tile, marble and stone were used; terrazzo flooring, created by chips of marble cast into cement, was also sometimes used in interiors. All of these materials helped cool the space. Consideration of geographic location was also examined during construction planning. For example, on average, Sicily receives 1,000 more hours of sunshine each year than Turin. The facades in Sicilian-built architecture seem extremely massive in comparison to contemporary ones in the Italian mainland. Regional variations like this can be seen throughout Italy, including Rome.

The role of furniture in Roman interiors was to emphasize social status and to simply add a decorative element to the interior. Carving was the preferred method of decorating furniture, while walnut was the primary furniture wood. Emphasis for furniture was on carved and turned members, which were elaborately placed on high-back armchairs and tables.

Spatial relationships for the interior in the age of the Baroque changed from the block structure of the Renaissance to more open planning. Grand proportions were typical in Baroque interiors. The salone was given high priority, again with an emphasis on exaggerated decoration, this time incorporating accents into the room at different heights. Niches, entablatures, pediments and wall reliefs created dynamics within the space.

== See also ==
- Timeline of Italian artists to 1800
