= Ottavio Panciroli =

Italian author and historian

- Born: 1554; Reggio Emilia, Italy
- Died: 14 March 1624 (aged 70); Tivoli, Italy
- Occupations: Author and historian

Ottavio Panciroli was an Italian historian and writer, born in 1554 in Reggio Emilia. He died on 14 March 1624 in Tivoli. He published several books, but was most famous for I tesori nascosti nell'alma città di Roma and Roma sacra e moderna (rough translation: "The treasures hidden in the haughty city of Rome" and "sacred and modern Rome").

The Via Ottavio Panciroli in Rome is named after him.
