= Carlo Maderno =

Italian architect (1556–1629)

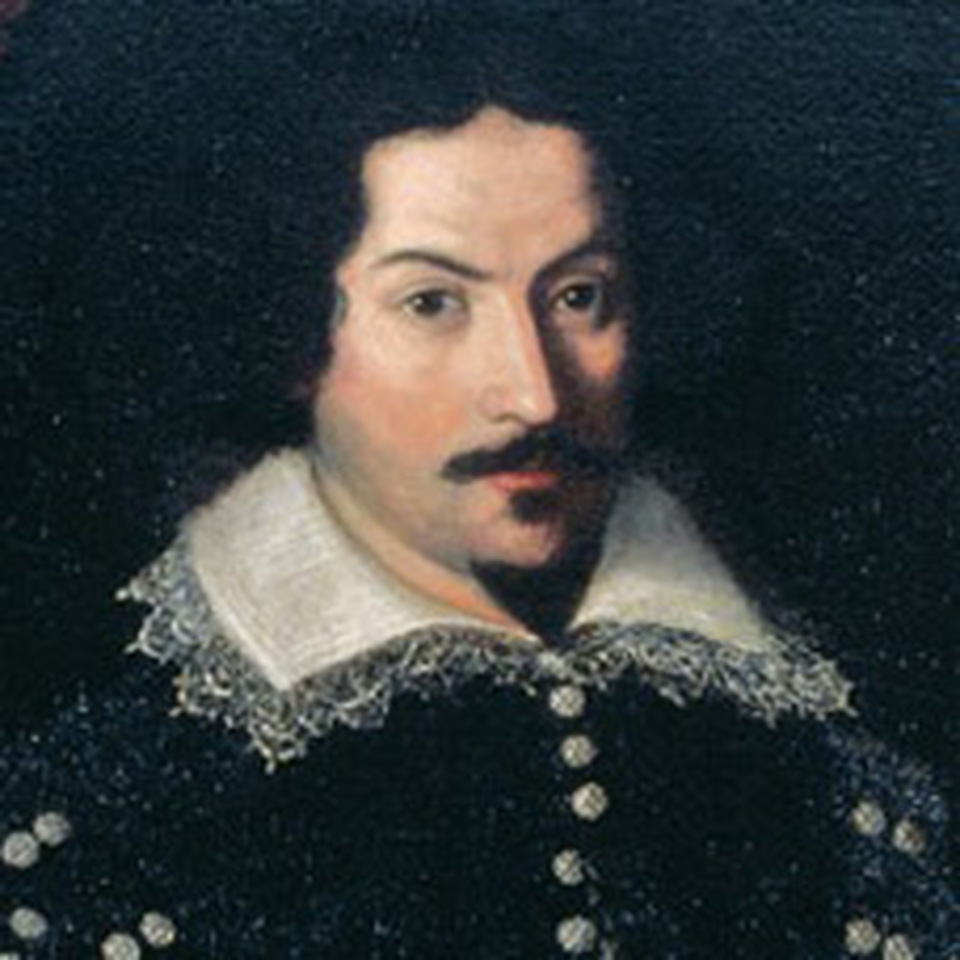
- An anonymous portrait of Carlo Maderno
- Born: 1556; Capolago, Swiss Confederacy
- Died: 31 January 1629 (aged 72–73); Rome, Papal States
- Known for: Architecture
- Movement: Baroque
- Relatives: Domenico Fontana (uncle); Stefano Maderno (alleged brother)

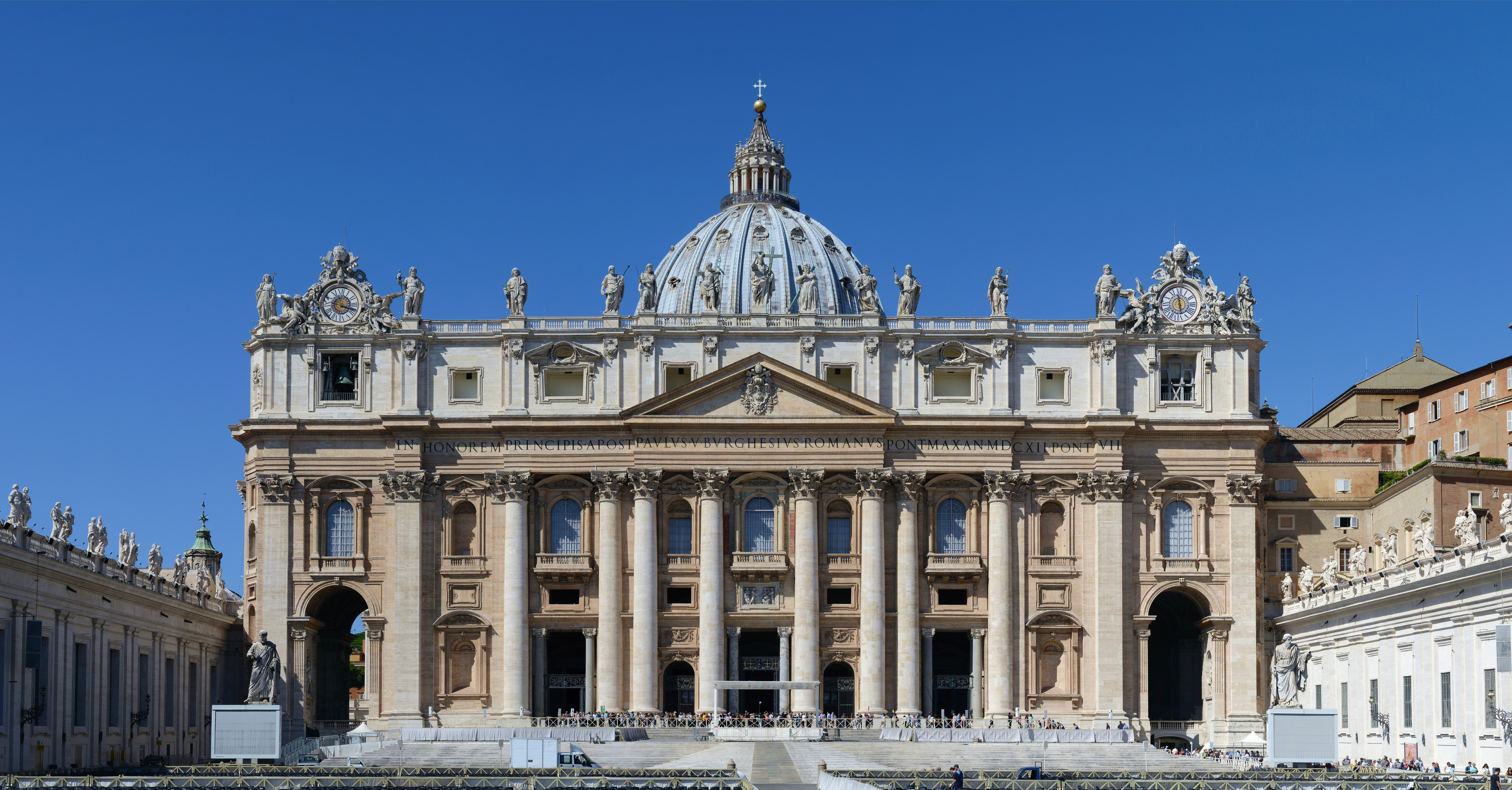
Façade of St. Peter's Basilica from Rome

Carlo Maderno or Maderna (1556 – 31 January 1629) was an Italian architect, born in today's Ticino, Switzerland, who is remembered as one of the fathers of Baroque architecture. His façades of Santa Susanna, St. Peter's Basilica, and Sant'Andrea della Valle were of key importance in the evolution of the Italian Baroque. He often is referred to as the brother of sculptor Stefano Maderno, but this is not universally agreed upon.

== Biography ==
Born in Capolago, in today's Ticino, which at the time was a bailiwick of the Swiss Confederacy, Maderno began his career in the marble quarries of the far north, before moving to Rome in 1588 with four of his brothers to assist his uncle Domenico Fontana. He worked initially as a marble cutter. This background in sculptural workmanship would help mould his architecture. His first solo project, in 1596, was an utterly confident and mature façade for the ancient church of Santa Susanna (1597–1603); it was among the first Baroque façades to break with the Mannerist conventions that are exemplified in the Gesù. The structure is a dynamic rhythm of columns and pilasters, with a protruding central bay and condensed central decoration add complexity to the structure. There is an incipient playfulness with the rules of classic design, while still maintaining rigour.

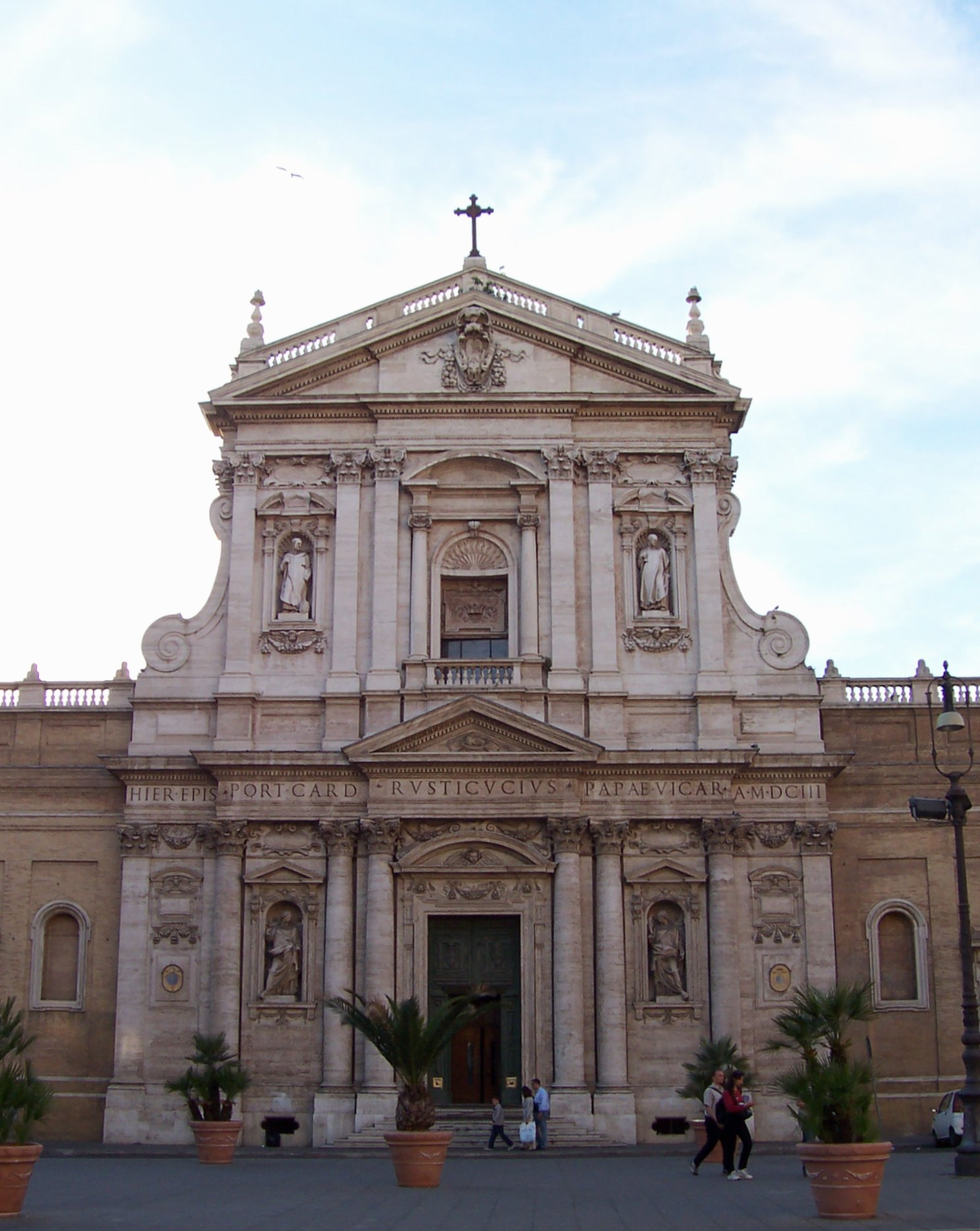
The façade of Santa Susanna, Rome

In this period, Maderno reconfigured the new Cerasi Chapel, formerly Foscari, in Santa Maria del Popolo.

The Santa Susanna façade won the attention of Pope Paul V, who appointed him chief architect of St. Peter's. Maderno was forced to modify Michelangelo's plans for the Basilica and provide designs for an extended nave with a palatial façade. The façade (completed in 1612) is constructed to allow for Papal blessings from the emphatically enriched balcony above the central door. This forward extension of the basilica that grew from Michelangelo's Greek cross to the present Latin cross, has been criticized because it blocks the view of the dome when seen from the Piazza. Such criticism often ignores the fact that the approaching avenue is modern. Maderno did not have so much freedom in designing this building as he had for other structures.

Most of Maderno's work continued to be the remodelling of existing structures. The only building designed by Maderno (except for the facade) and completed under his supervision was the layout and interior Santa Maria della Vittoria (1608–20), where Maderno's work is often ignored in favour of Bernini's Cornaro Chapel and its Ecstasy of St. Theresa.

Even Maderno's masterpiece, the church of Sant'Andrea della Valle, is not entirely his. There he designed the façade and executed the dome, the third largest in Rome after St. Peter's and the Pantheon. The church had been designed for the Theatines by Giuseppe Francesco Grimaldi and Giacomo della Porta in 1540: it follows a familiar Jesuit plan, cruciform, its wide nave without aisles, with chapels beyond arched openings. The crossing contains the high altar, lit under Maderno's dome (frescoed by Giovanni Lanfranco 1621–25) on its high windowed drum. The earliest design is from 1608; construction took place from 1621 to 1625. At Maderno's death, the façade remained only half-built; it was completed to Maderno's original conception by Carlo Fontana. In this façade, the standard formula established at Il Gesù is given more movement and depth—in the varying planes of the frieze and cornice—and increased chiaroscuro—with whole columns embedded in snug dark recesses that outline their profiles with shadow—, and in similar elements that are re-grouped for a tighter, more sprung rhythm.

Related domes

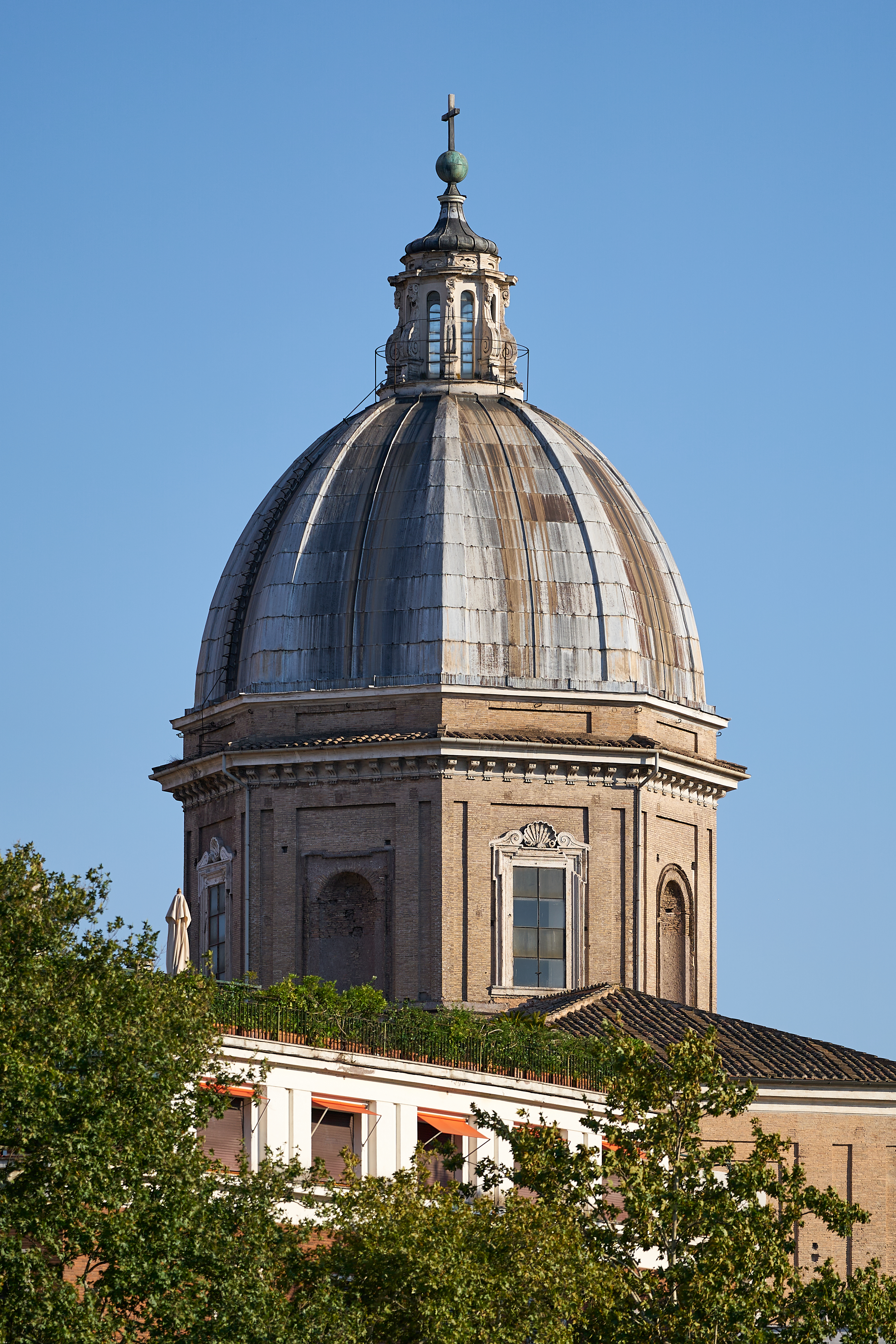
San Giovanni dei Fiorentini

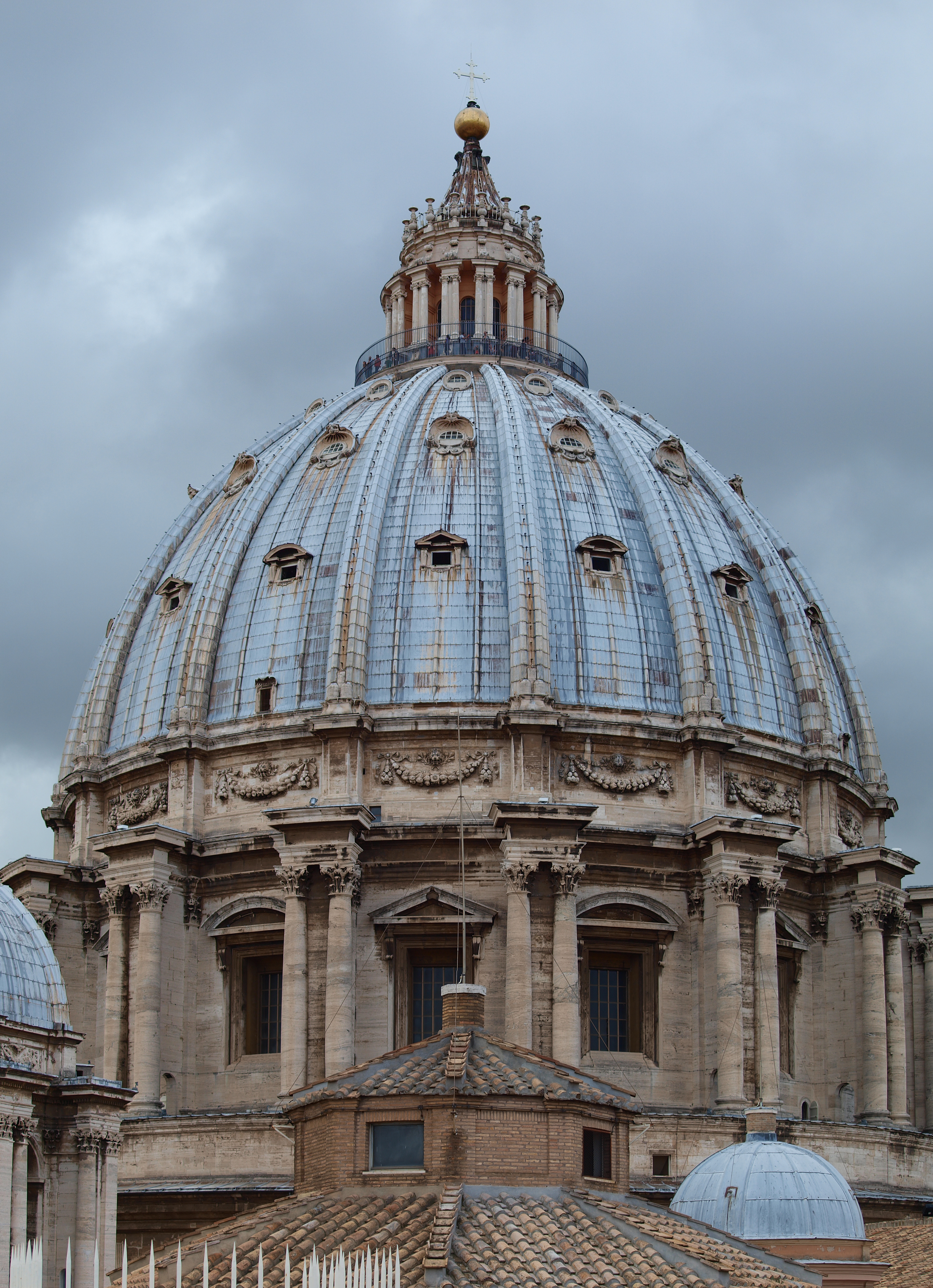
Dome of Saint Peter's Basilica, which influenced Maderno's

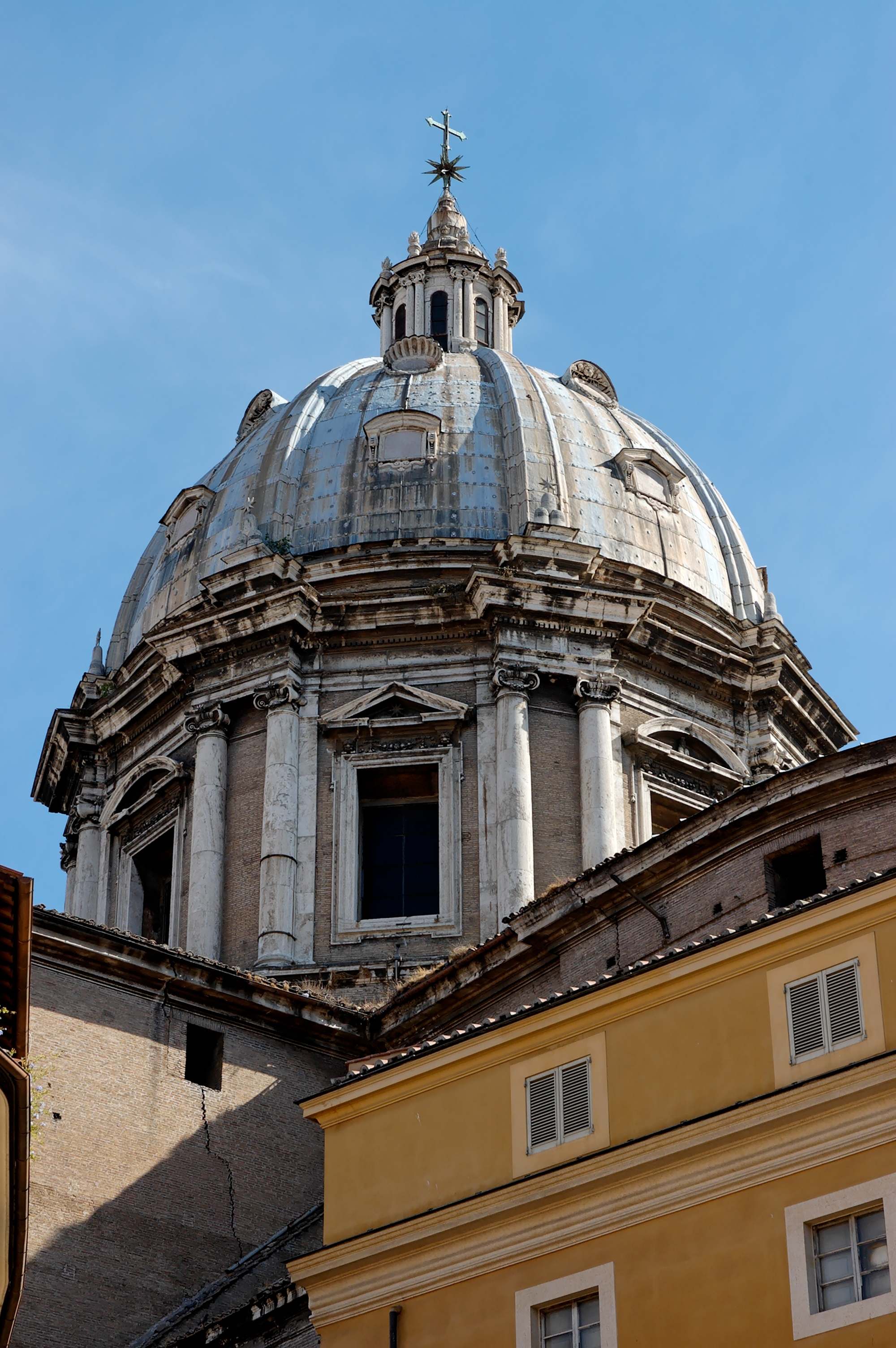
Sant Andrea della Valle

His other works include the Roman churches of Gesù e Maria (although this is disputed), San Giacomo degli Incurabili, Santa Lucia in Selci. After the death of Giacomo della Porta in 1602, Moderno took over the work at San Giovanni dei Fiorentini (where he is buried). He directed the construction of the dome and the main body of the church.

In addition, he worked on the Quirinal Palace, the Papal Palace of Castel Gandolfo and the Palazzo Barberini for the Barberini Pope Urban VIII (1628 and completed 1633; much remodeled since). In the Palazzo Barberini at Quattro Fontane, Maderno's work is overshadowed at times by details added by Bernini and Borromini, whose works were influenced by Maderno. His design of palaces is best represented by his design of Palazzo Mattei (1598–1618).

Maderno was called upon to design chapels within existing churches: the Chapel of St. Lawrence in San Paolo fuori le Mura and the Cappella Caetani in Santa Pudenziana.

He designed the base supporting the Marian column in front of Basilica di Santa Maria Maggiore, which later served as a model for numerous Marian columns. At Ferrara, he designed the fortifications.

The last work by Maderno at St. Peter's was a crypt-like space under the dome that is referred to as the "Confessio". From there, privileged persons such as cardinals could descend in order to be near the burial place of Saint Peter. Its marble steps are remnants of the old basilica. Around the balustrade of the Confessio are 95 bronze lamps that remain lit perpetually.

Maderno died in Rome on 31 January 1629, at the age of 73; his body was buried in the church of San Giovanni dei Fiorentini.

== Sources ==
- Hibbard, Howard (1972). Carlo Maderno and Roman Architecture 1580–1630. University Park: Pennsylvania State University Press.
- Wittkower, Rudolf (1993). Art and Architecture Italy, 1600–1750. Pelican History of Art. Harmondsworth: Penguin Books Ltd. pp. 110–115.
