= Duchâtel =

Duchâtel or du Châtel or du Chastel is a French surname. It may refer to:

- François Duchatel or du Chastel (1616–1694), Flemish painter
- Guigues du Chastel (1083–1136), Carthusian monk and 5th prior of Grande Chartreuse monastery in the 12th century
- Marie Duchatel or du Chastel (died 1692), painter from the Southern Netherlands
- Tanneguy Duchâtel (1803–1867, Paris), French politician, Minister of the Interior in the July Monarchy
- Tanneguy du Chastel (or Tanguy du Châtel) (1369–1449), Breton military leader of the Hundred Years' War
