= Pierre-Denis Martin =

Pierre-Denis Martin may refer to:

- Pierre-Denis Martin (1663–1742) (called "Martin le Jeune", "Martin des Gobelins" or "Martin the Younger"), painter
- Pierre-Denis Martin (1771-1855), member of the Egyptian Institute of Sciences and Arts
