= John Baptist Medina =

Flemish-Spanish artist

John Baptiste Medina
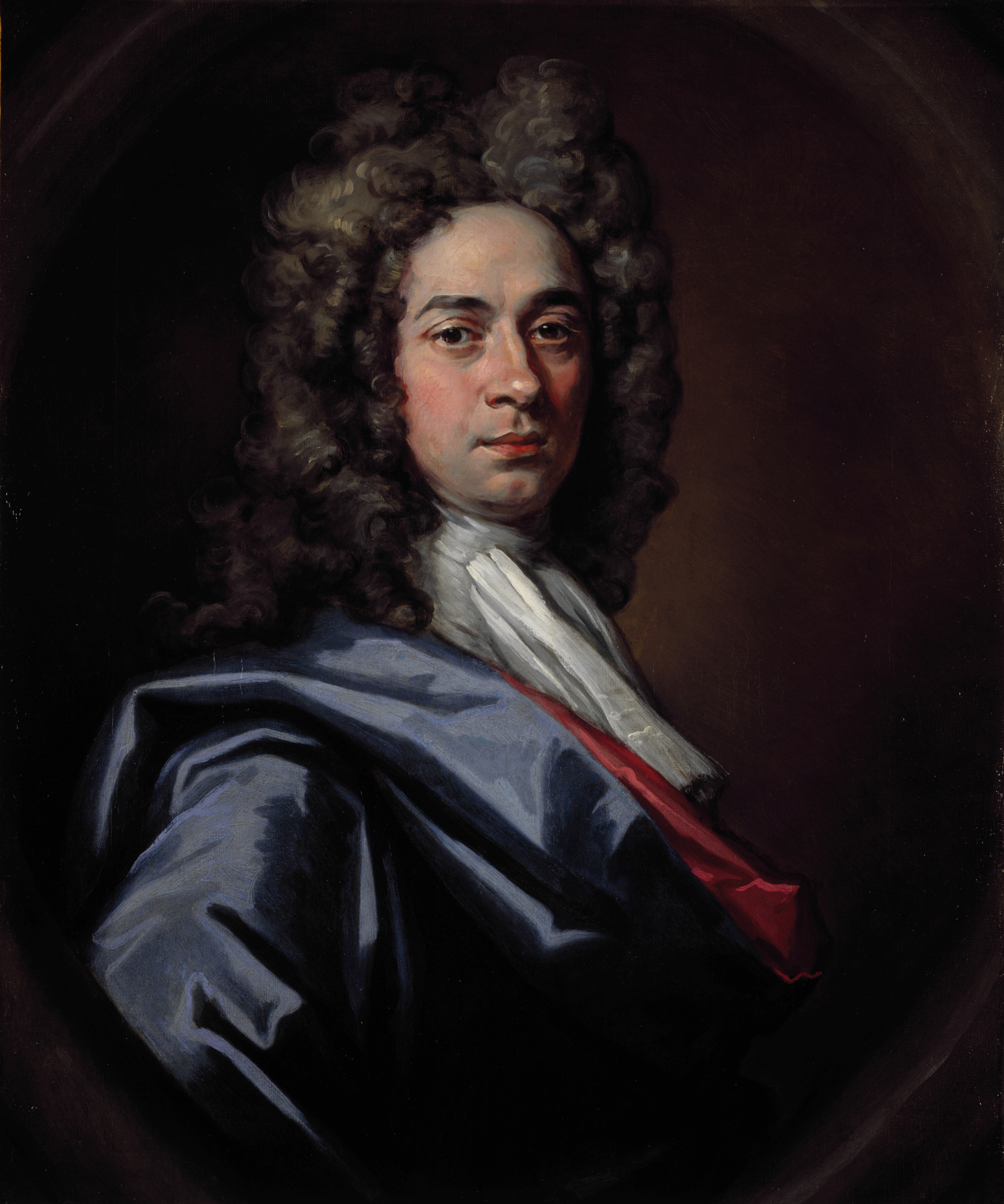
- Self-portrait, c. 1698
- Born: c. 1 January 1659; Brussels, Spanish Netherlands
- Died: 5 October 1710 (aged 51); Edinburgh, Scotland

Sir John Baptist Medina (1659 – 5 October 1710) was an artist of Flemish-Spanish origin who worked in England and Scotland, mostly as a portrait painter, though he was also the first illustrator of Paradise Lost by John Milton in 1688.

== Life and portrait-painting ==
Medina was the son of a Spanish army captain posted to Brussels, where he was born and later trained by François Duchatel, before coming to London in 1686 and setting up his studio in Drury Lane. Even in London he seems to have specialized in Scottish sitters, and in either 1688–89 or 1694 he moved to Edinburgh at the invitation of David Leslie, 3rd Earl of Leven. He remained there for the rest of his life. He was encouraged and sponsored by the Earl of Melville, whom he painted in London. From 1689, Melville, like many of Medina's subjects, a strong Whig, was Secretary of State for Scotland, effectively running the country for the King in London. With little competition, Medina was the most prominent Scottish portraitist for the rest of his life, charging £5 for a head and £10 for a half-length.

His best known works are a group of about 30 oval bust-lengths, including a self-portrait, in Surgeons' Hall, Edinburgh; these are invariably compared to the Kit Cat Club series in London by Sir Godfrey Kneller. His style follows the conventions of Kneller, but his portraits are often more relaxed and informal, favouring relatively bright blues and rose-reds in the clothing, and dark backgrounds. The quality of the painting can vary considerably, probably reflecting the use of his assistants. In 1706, he was knighted, one of the last batch of Scottish knights to be created before the Acts of Union 1707.

Medina died in Edinburgh on 5 October 1710. He was buried in Greyfriars Kirkyard in the centre of the city. The grave is a solid enclosed vault on the east side, now appearing half-sunken, adjacent to the steps leading to the northern section. The engraver, William Howison, is buried in front of the vault.

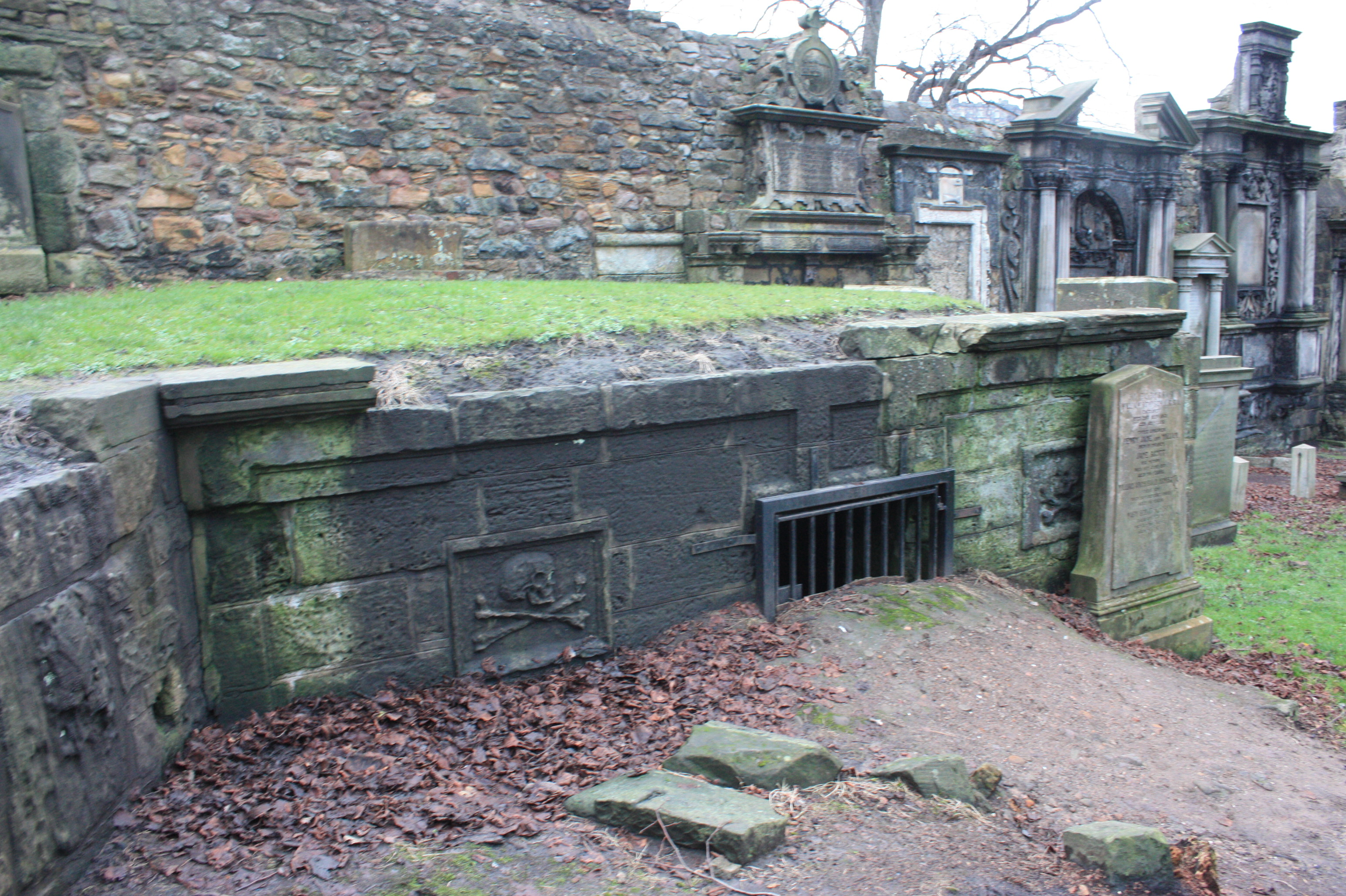
The vault of Sir John Medina, Greyfriars Kirkyard, Edinburgh

He trained both his own son and the talented William Aikman, the leading Scottish portrait-painter of the next generation.

The Scottish National Portrait Gallery has a representative ten works, including another self-portrait, and a group of subject pictures bought from his studio by Sir John Clerk is held at Penicuik. Most of his paintings remain in Scotland – there are none, for example, in the National Portrait Gallery, London.

== Illustrations to Paradise Lost ==
Although he appears to have painted other types of work than portraits, the only works other than portraits known to survive are his eight (out of a total of twelve plates prefacing each book of the poem) engraved book illustrations for the fourth edition, the first to be illustrated, of Paradise Lost by John Milton, published in London by Jacob Tonson in 1688. Though they have been described, perhaps rather unfairly, as "stiff and archaic", these follow Milton's text carefully, unlike those of the artists used for the other prints, and usually include several different episodes in each illustration. Appropriately, Medina drew on traditional Biblical iconography, carefully and imaginatively adapting it to fit Milton's text. Medina's designs preface Books 3 and 5 to 11; the plates were engraved from his designs by a specialist, Michael Burghers (also Burgese or Burgess), a Flemish engraver working in Oxford, who signed all but one plate as the engraver. They were still being used, in rather worn-out condition, for the sixth edition of 1695.

The exact authorship of some plates is a matter of dispute. Purely based on the interpretation of a handwritten note attributed to Horace Walpole in the New York City Public Library copy of the book, Henry Aldrich, an Oxford don of diverse talents, but not otherwise known as an artist, has been identified as the unknown artist of some plates, usually Books I, II and XII. Bernard Lens II, otherwise known as a painter of enamels, is signed as the artist for Book IV, and Medina is signed as the artist for one more plate than some say would seem likely to be his on stylistic grounds.

== Gallery of illustrations to Paradise Lost (1688) ==
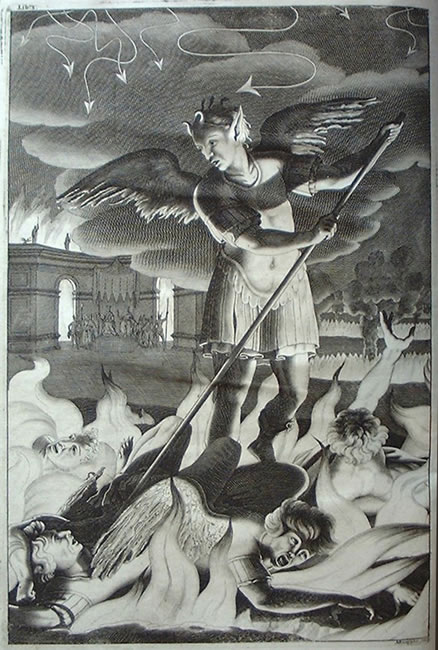
Book 1: Satan Rousing the Rebel Angels. Anonymous artist, possibly Henry Aldrich.

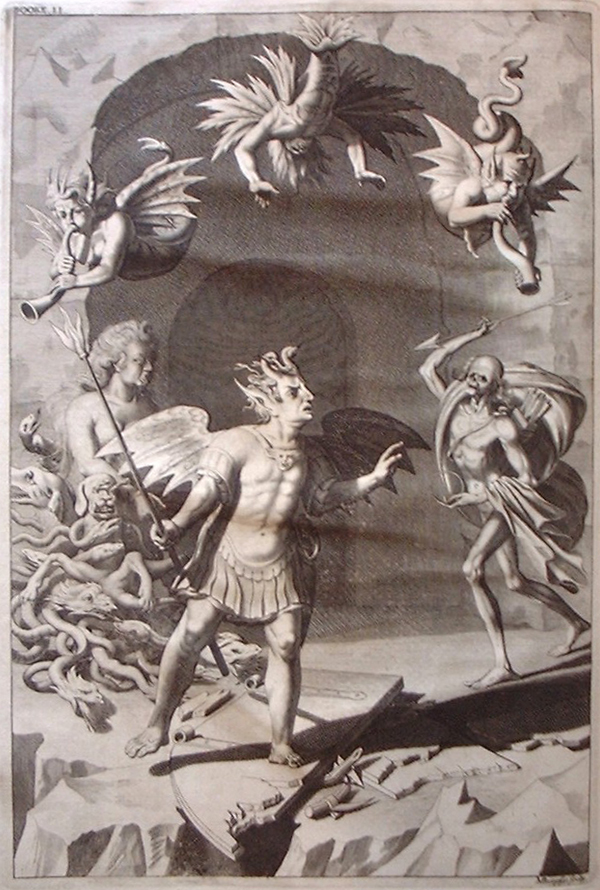
Book 2: Satan, Sin, and Death. Anonymous artist, possibly Henry Aldrich.

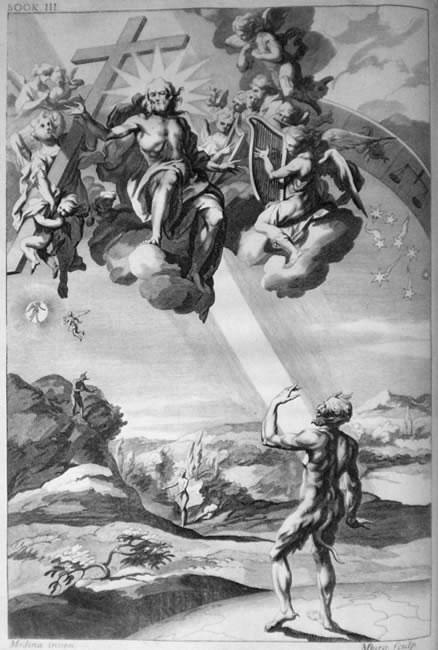
Book 3: The Creation of Man. Medina.

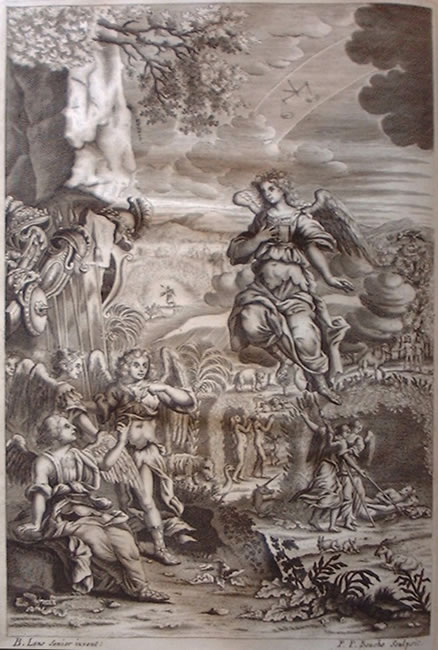
Book 4: Gabriel Expels Satan from the Garden. Signed by Bernard Lens.

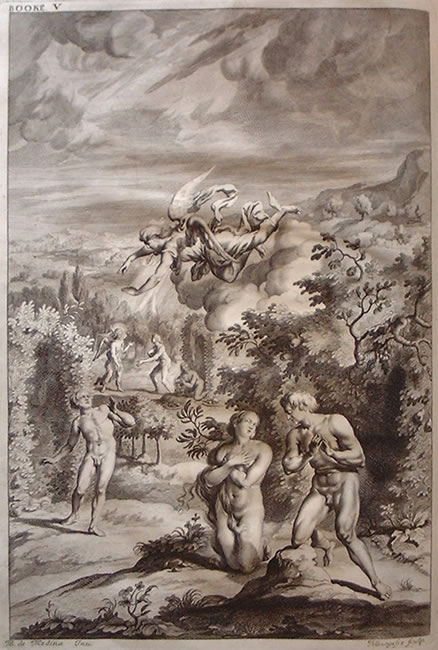
Book 5. Eve Relates her Dream to Adam. Medina

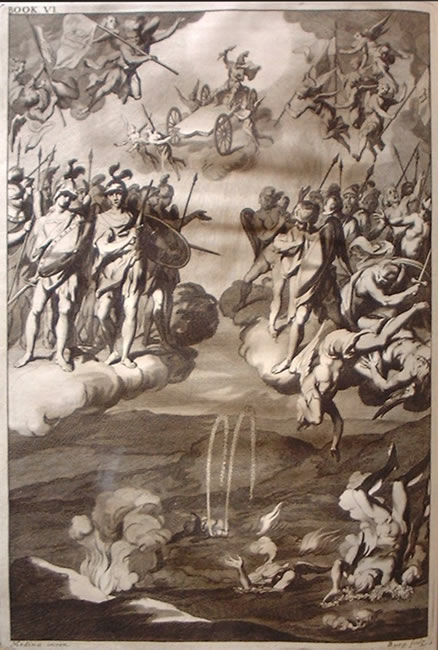
Book 6: War in Heaven. Medina

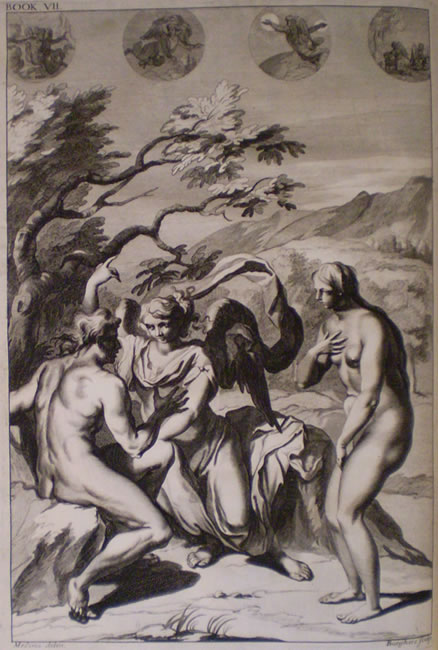
Book 7: Raphael warns Adam. Medina

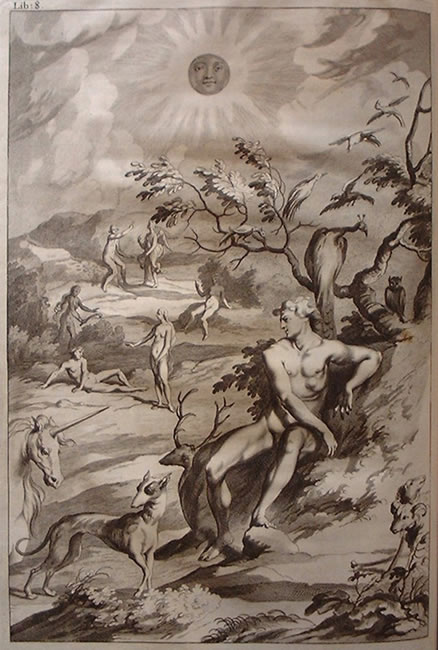
Book 8: Raphael advises Patience. Medina

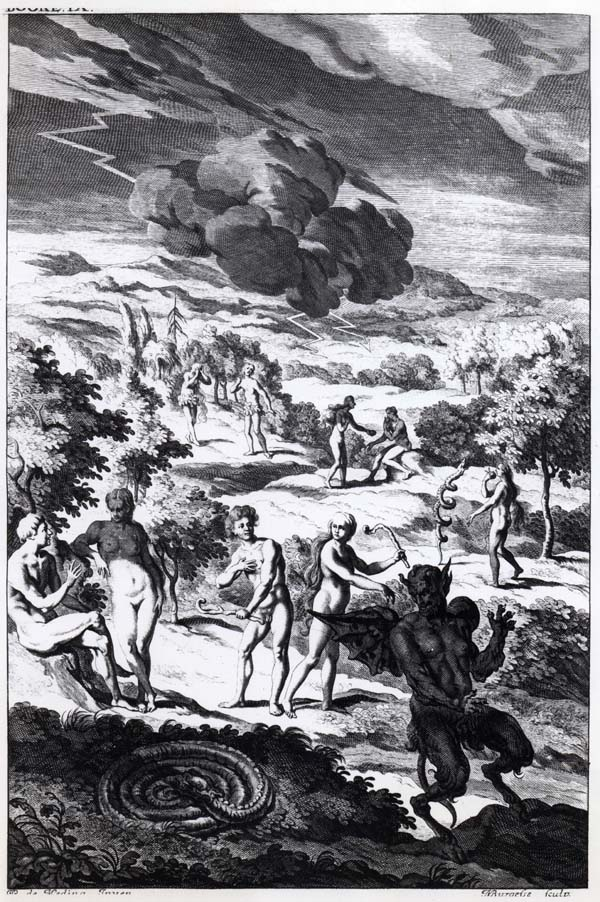
Book 9: The Fall. Medina

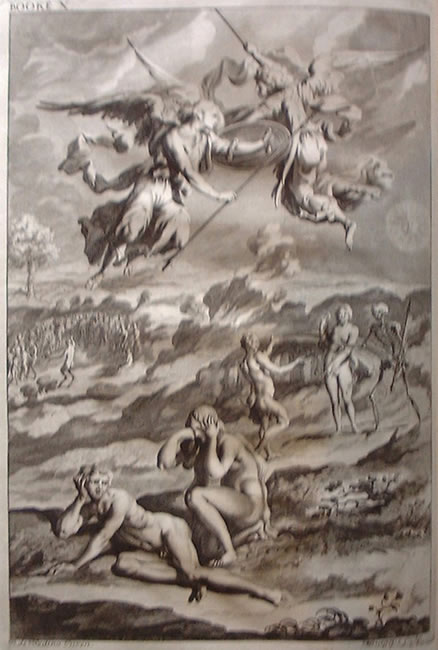
Book 10: The Triumph of Satan and the Judgement of Adam and Eve. Medina

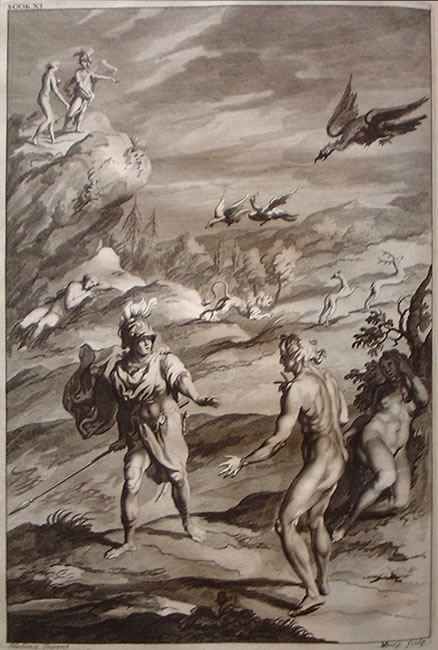
Book 11: St Michael foretells the Crucifixion. Medina

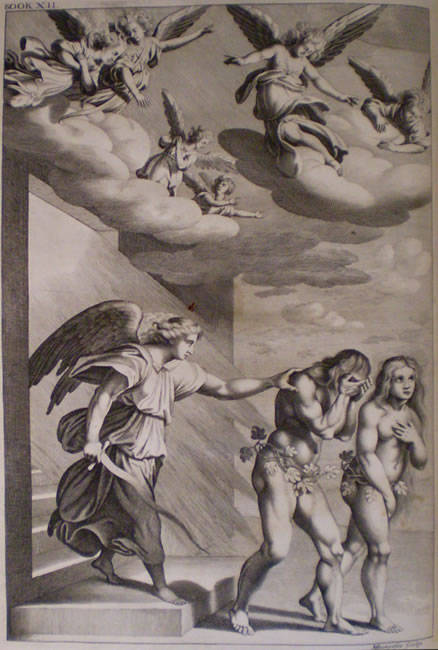
Book 12: The Expulsion. Anonymous artist, possibly Henry Aldrich.

== Sources ==
- National Galleries of Scotland biography
- Behrendt, Stephen C.; The Moment of Explosion: Blake and the Illustration of Milton, University of Nebraska Press, 1983, ISBN 0-8032-1169-4
- Earl Roy Miner, William Moeck, Steven Edward Jablonski, Steven Jablonski; Paradise Lost, 1668–1968: Three Centuries of Commentary, Bucknell University Press, 2004, ISBN 0-8387-5577-1, online
- Waterhouse, Ellis; "Painting in Britain, 1530–1790", 4th Edn, 1978, Penguin Books (now Yale History of Art series)
