= Pierre-Denis Martin (1663–1742) =

French painter (1663 – 1742)

- Born: 1663
- Died: 1742 (aged 78–79); Paris, France
- Occupation: Painter

Pierre-Denis Martin (1663 – 1742) was a French painter of historical subjects, battles, hunts, and architectural views, particularly of royal residences, such as the Palace of Versailles and the Château de Compiègne. He was also known as Martin the Younger (le jeune) or Martin des Gobelins (because he was employed at the Gobelins Manufactory).

== Background ==
P.-D. Martin was born in Paris, and according to d'Argenville, he was the cousin of Jean-Baptiste Martin, while Pierre-Jean Mariette says he was J.-B. Martin's nephew and pupil. He is also said to have been the pupil of Adam François van der Meulen and the Parrocel.

== Work ==
He produced a series of paintings at the Château de Choisy, which are now in the Versailles Museum.

The dictionary of artists by Bellier de la Chavignerie and Auvray incorrectly attributes several paintings by Pierre-Denis Martin in the Versailles Museum to Jean-Baptiste Martin.

== Death ==
Pierre-Denis Martin died in Paris.

== Gallery ==
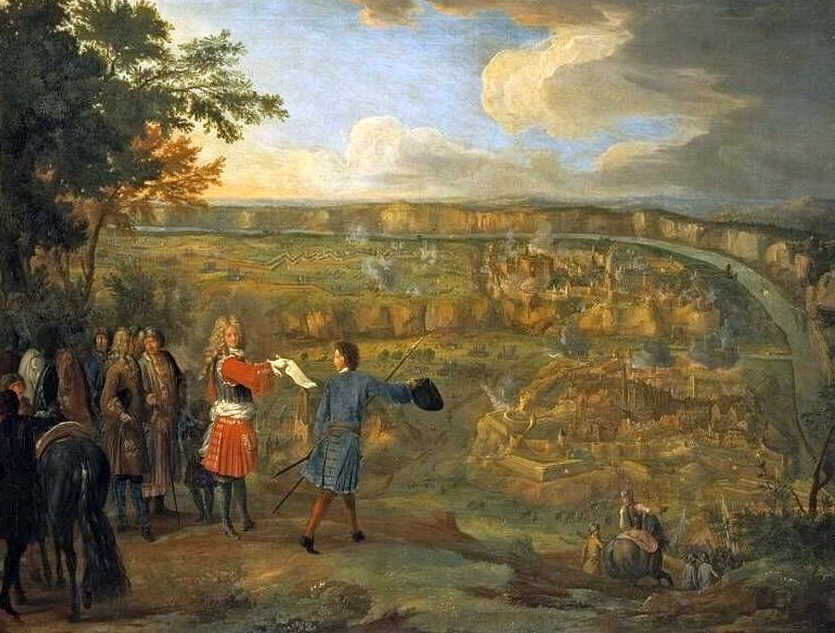
Battle of Yazlovets, 1684

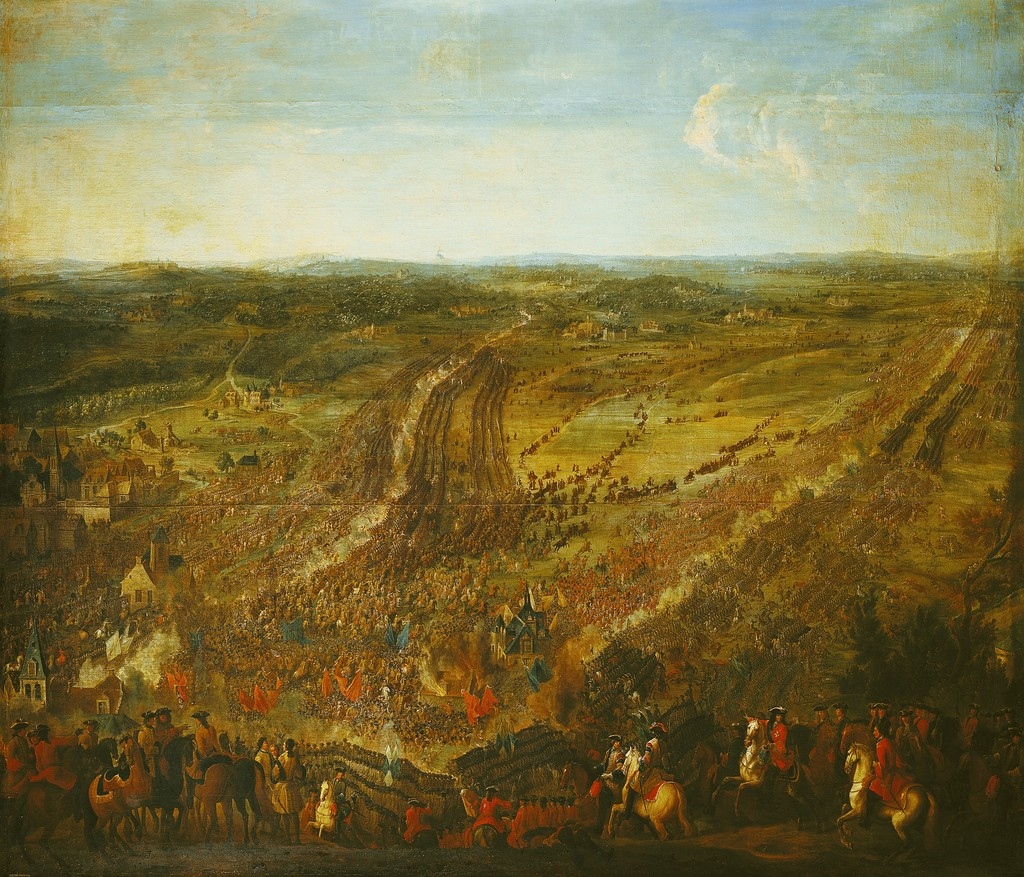
Battle of Fleurus, 1690

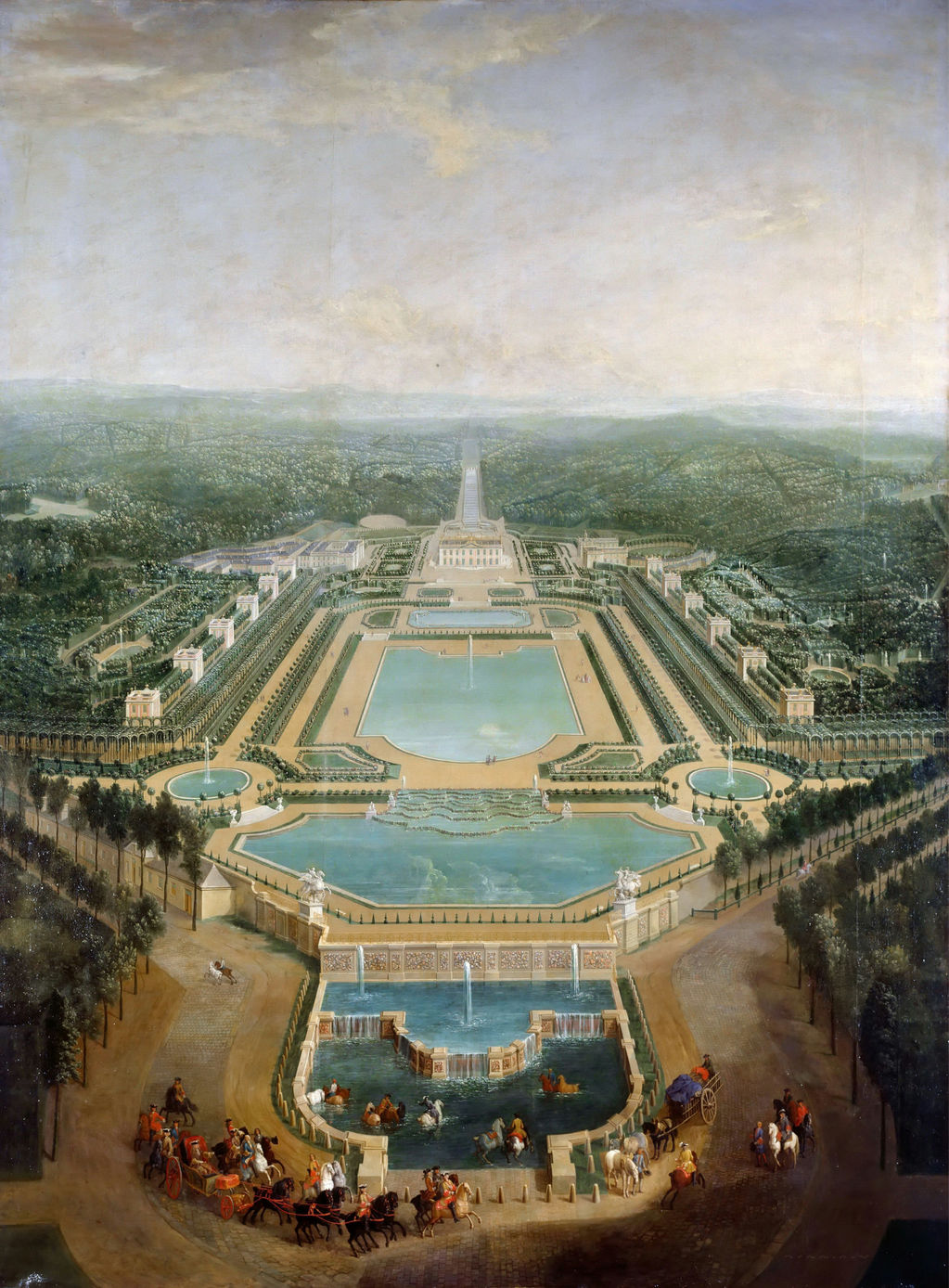
The Château de Marly, 1724

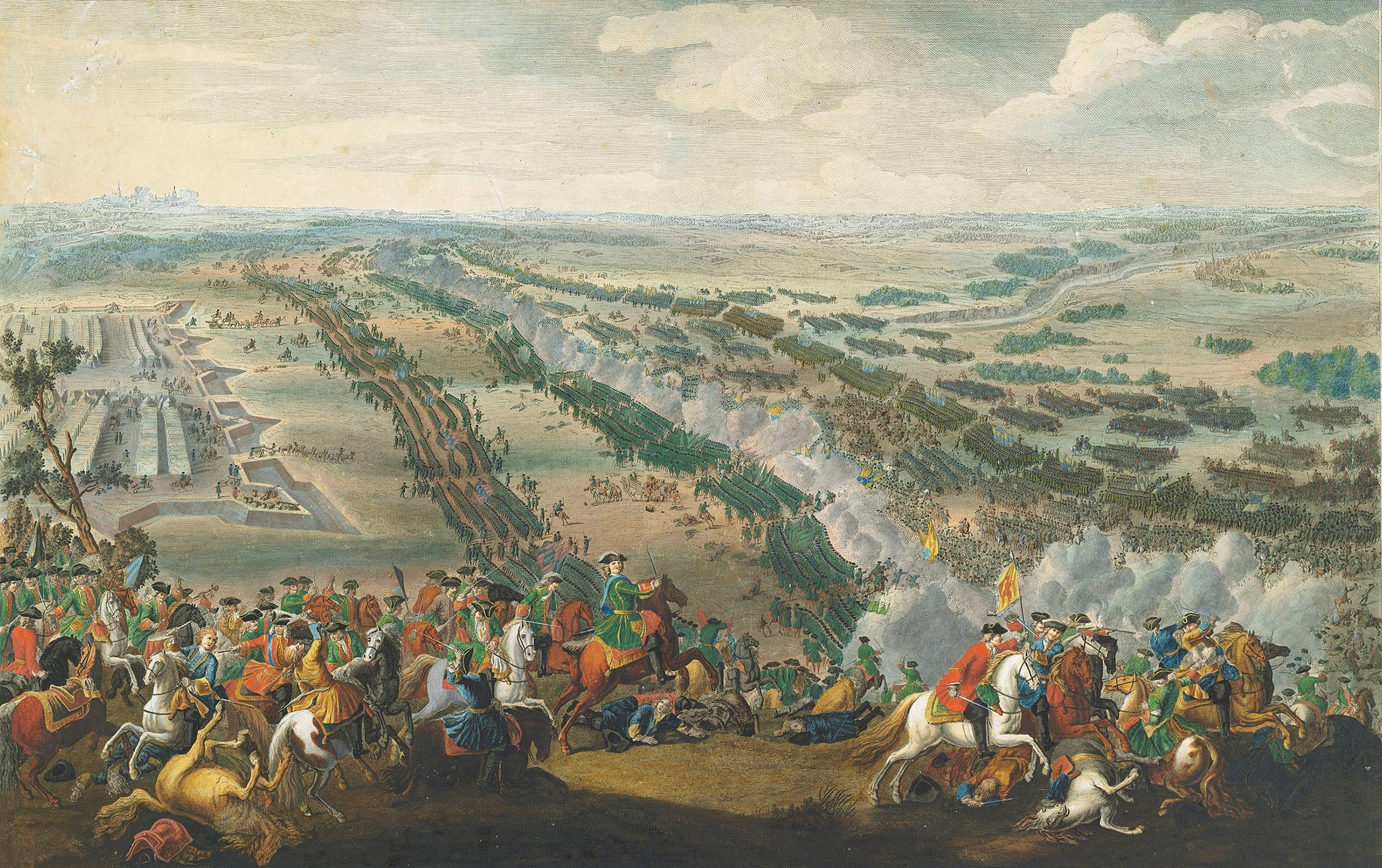
Battle of Poltava (in 1709), 1726

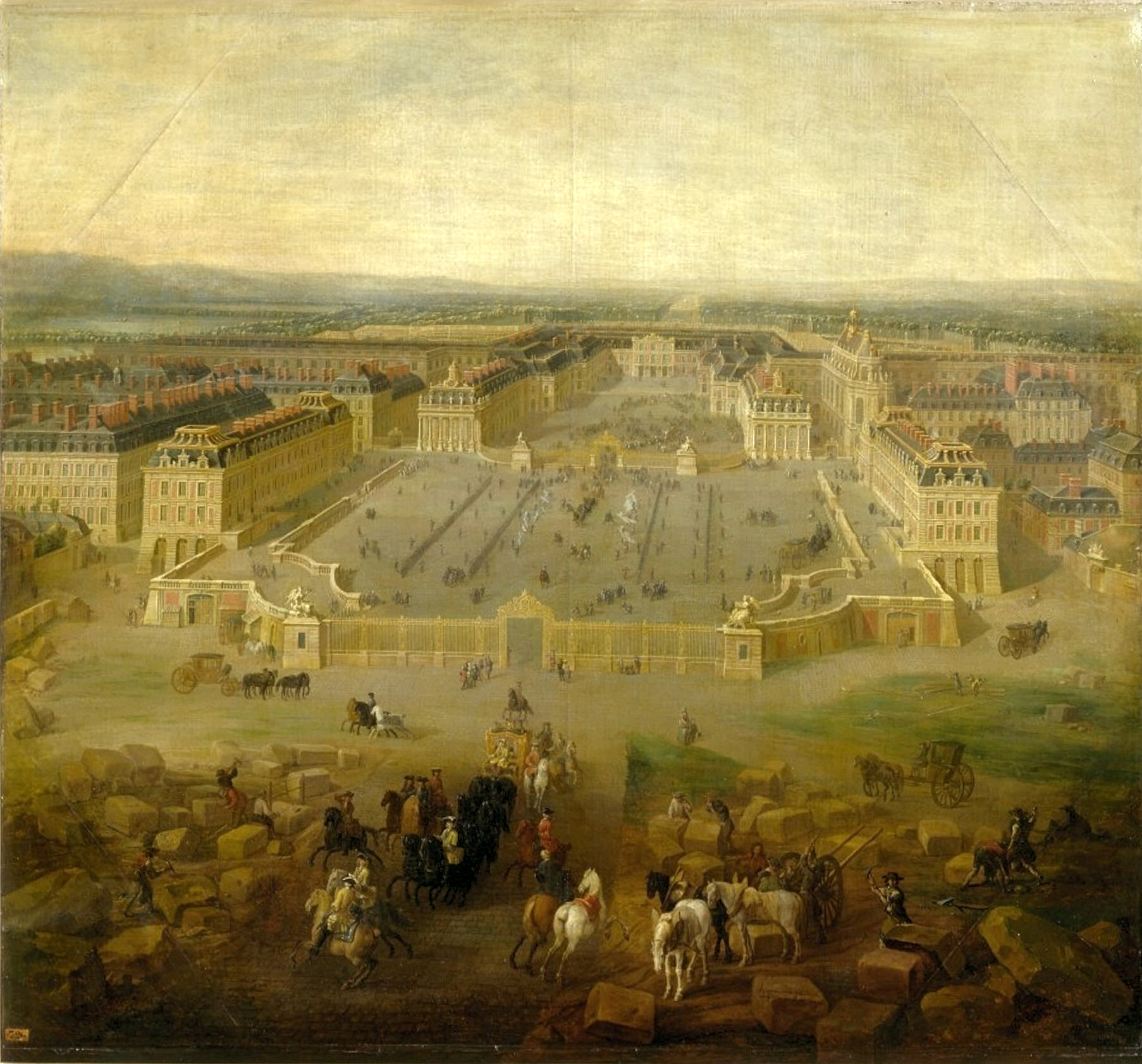
Palace of Versailles, 1722

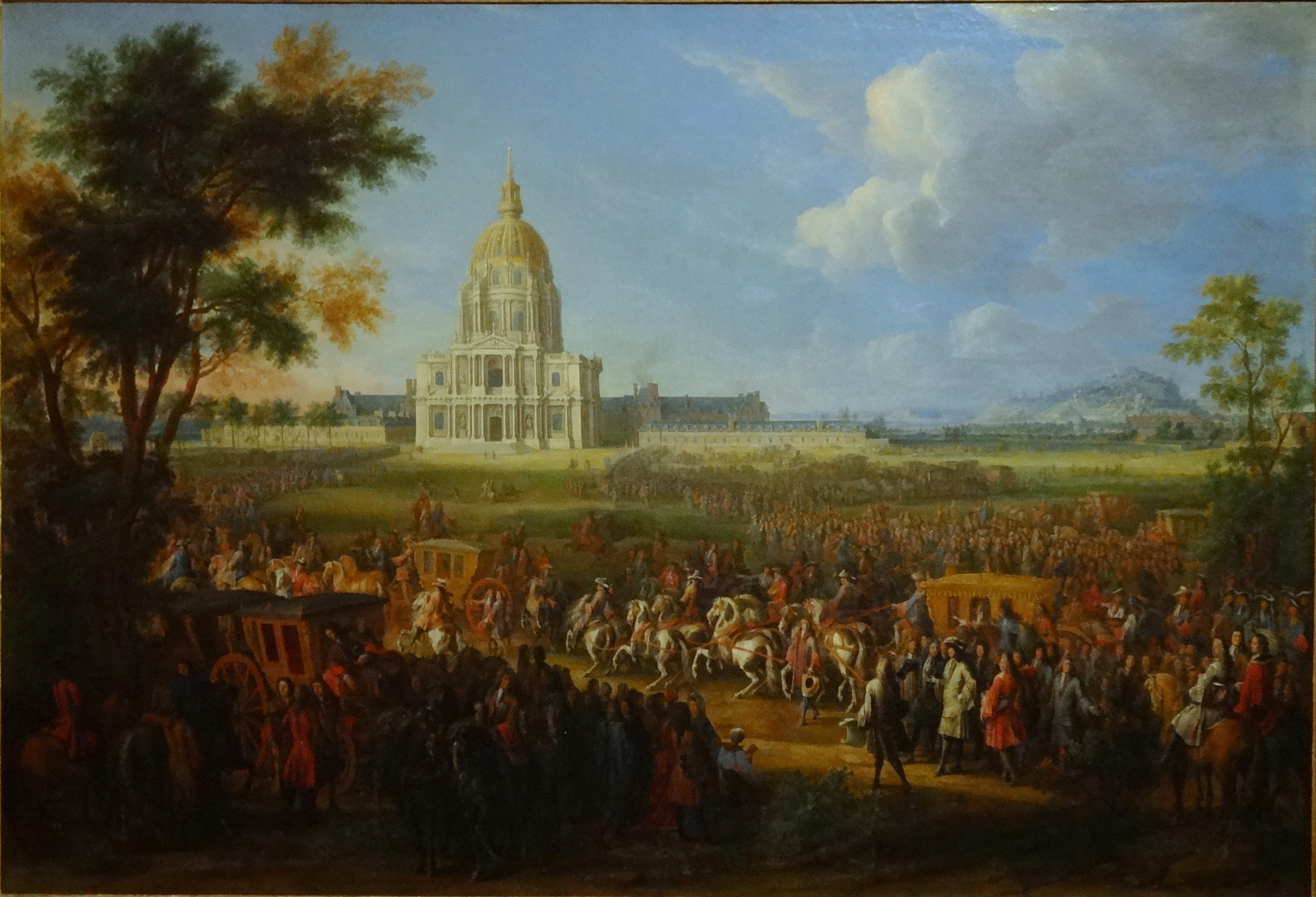
Louis XIV, visiting the Hôtel Royal des Invalides, 1706

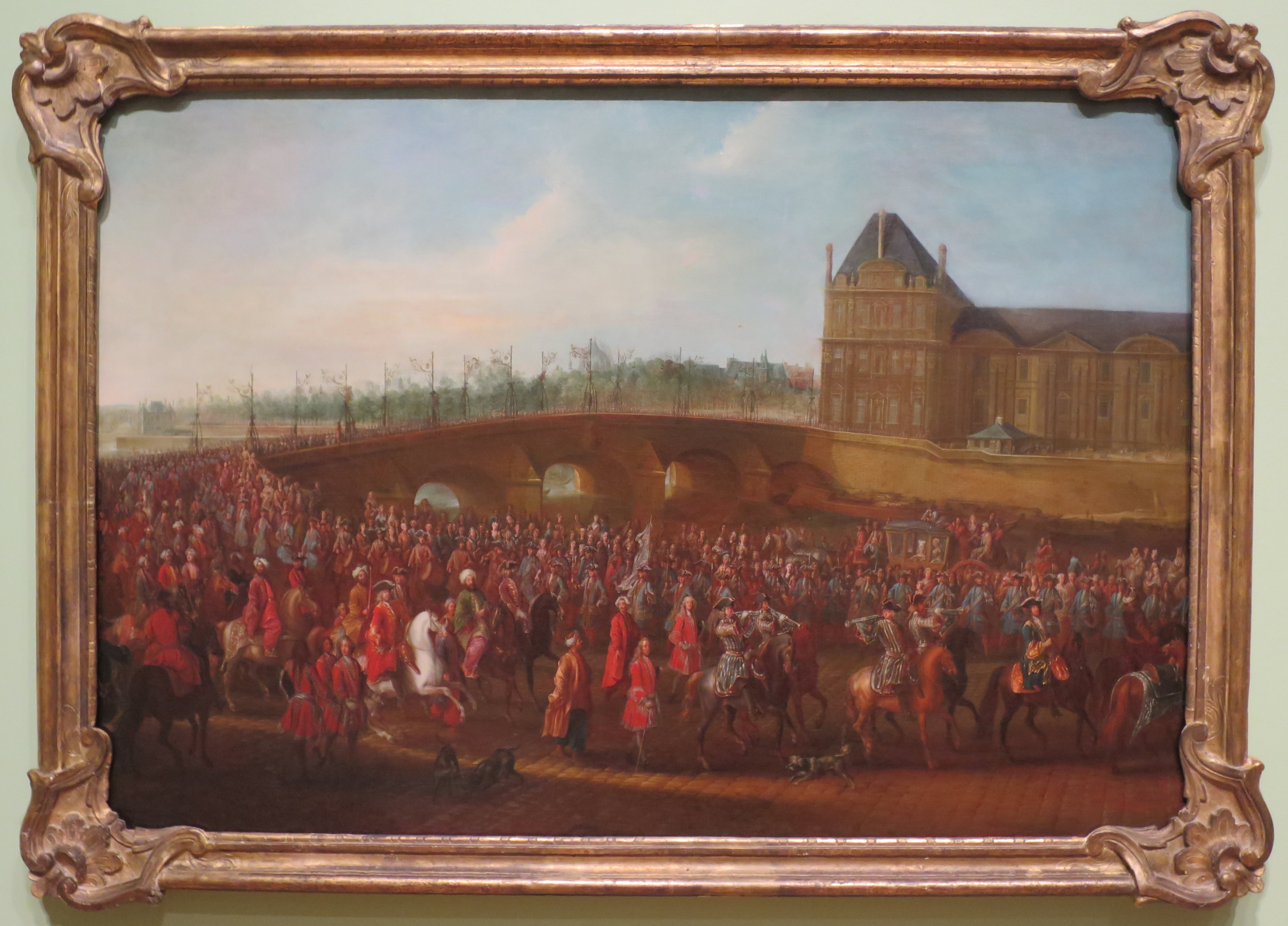
The Turkish ambassador Mehmet Efendi leaving the Tuileries Garden after an audience with Louis XV, 1721
