= Jan van Huchtenburg =

Dutch painter (1646–1733)

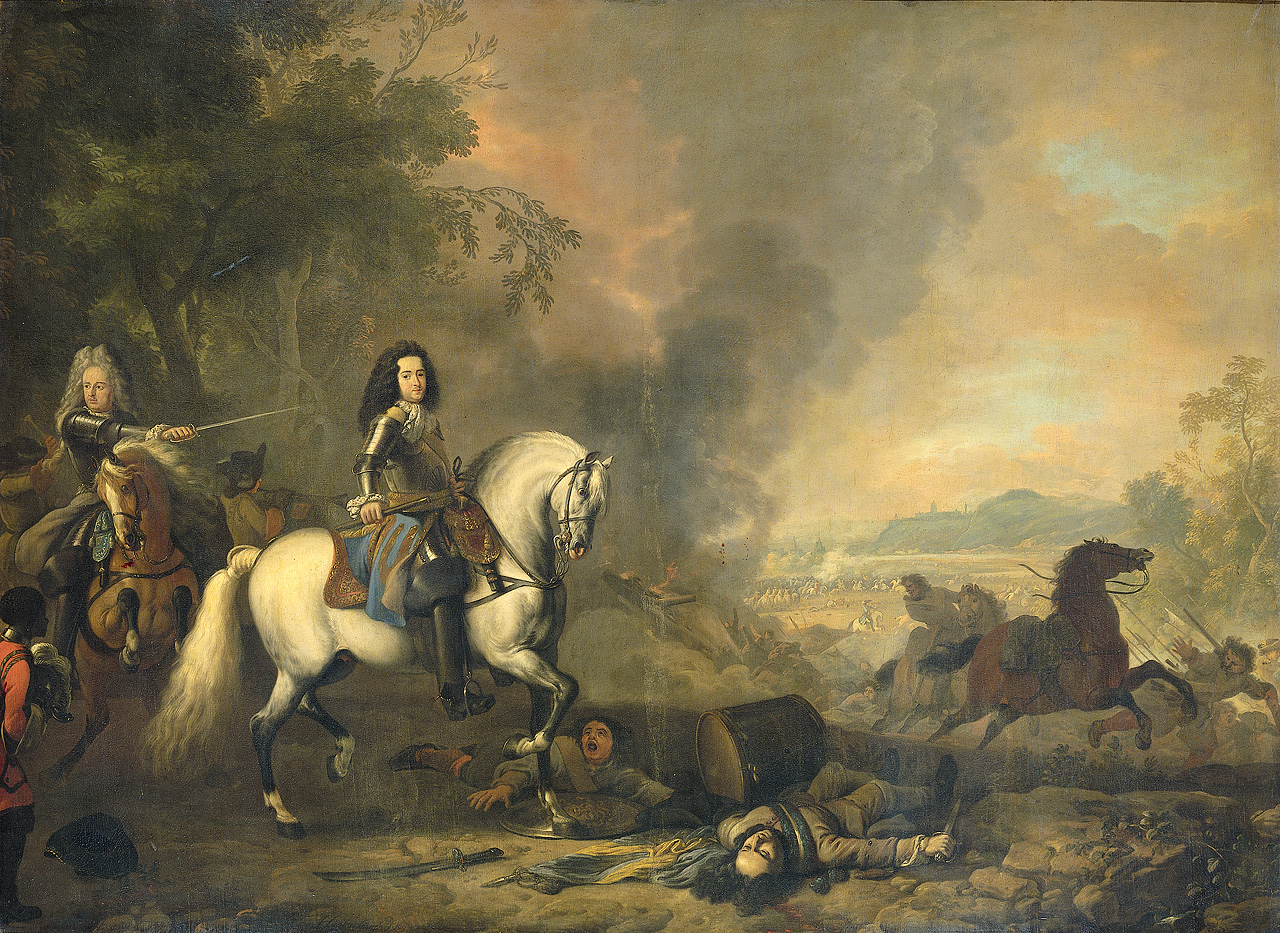
- Portrait of Henry Casimir II, Prince of Nassau-Dietz (1692)
- Born: 1646; Haarlem, Dutch Republic
- Died: 1733 (aged 86–87); Amsterdam, Dutch Republic
- Known for: Painting, engraving, art dealing
- Notable work: The Battle of the Boyne (1690)
- Movement: Baroque

Jan van Huchtenburg also written as Johan van Huchtenburg (1646 – 1733) was a Dutch painter of equestrian and battle scenes, as well as an engraver of mezzotints, publisher, and art dealer. He is believed to have been a pupil of Thomas Wijck, as he collaborated with Jan Wijck. Much of what is known about his life comes from Arnold Houbraken.

The Battle of the Boyne (1690)

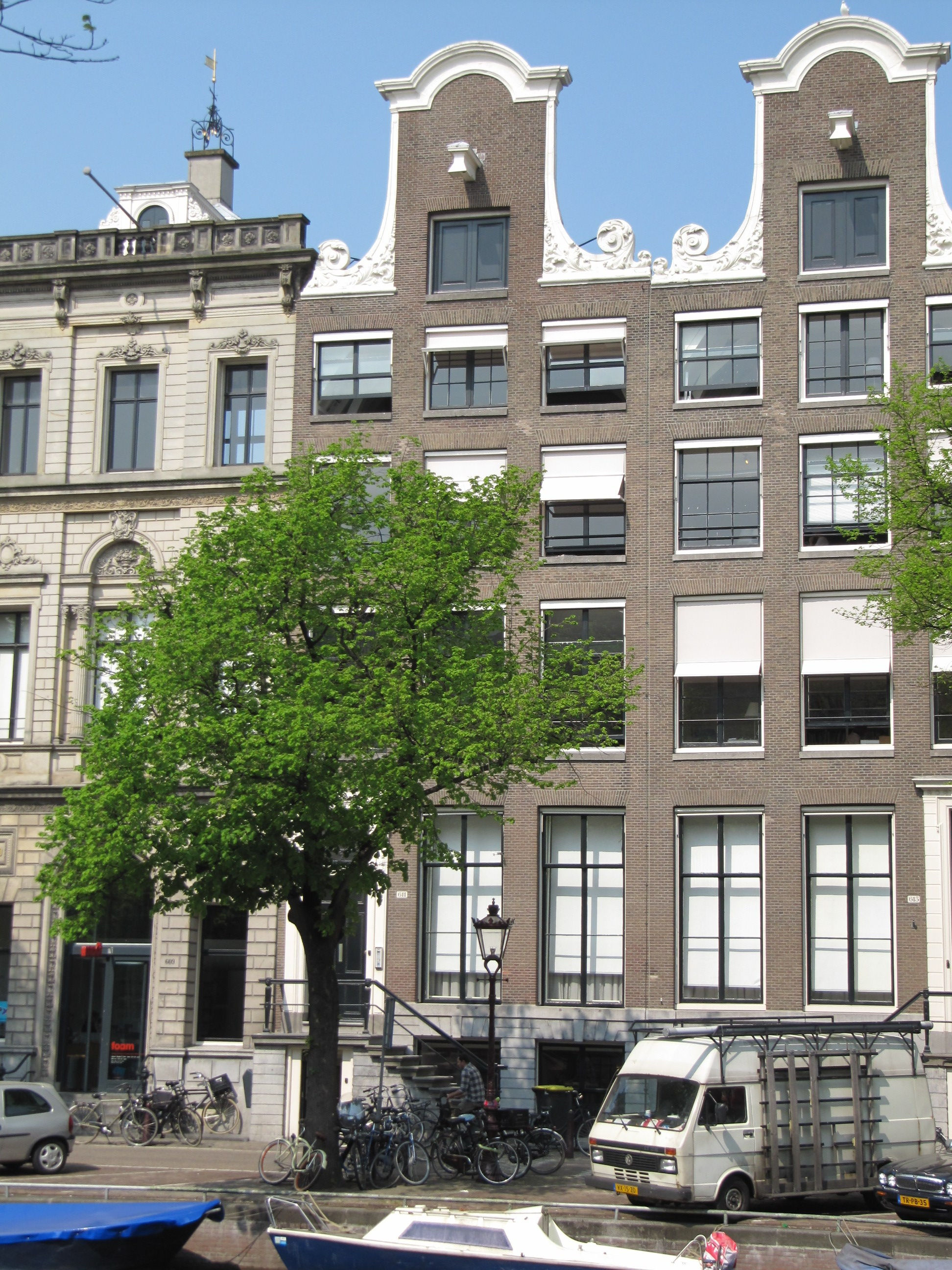
Keizersgracht 611, now the Foam Photography Museum

== Biography ==
Van Huchtenburg was born in Haarlem, where his father died at an early age. His brother Jacob studied under Nicolaes Pietersz. Berchem and travelled to Rome in 1662. In 1667, Jan himself went to Paris, where he worked at the Manufacture des Gobelins under Charles Le Brun and Adam Frans van der Meulen. His sketches were used for gobelins depicting horses and battle scenes.

In 1670 he returned to Haarlem and married Elisabeth Mommes, daughter of his guardian. By 1681, he had moved to Amsterdam. Huchtenburg assisted Gerrit Berckheyde by painting figures and horses in his cityscapes. In 1683 and 1685 he purchased property, including part of a garden house and a lot at what is now Keizersgracht 611. This appears to have been a case of real estate speculation, as he resold the property a few months later.

In 1709, he entered the service of Prince Eugene of Savoy and accompanied him on campaign. At the prince’s request, Huchtenburg painted ten large battle scenes, some of which remain in the Galleria Sabauda in Turin. He is said to have later reproduced these works on a smaller scale, as they were listed in 1729 among the possessions of broker Johannes Staats.

The series of ten paintings includes depictions of:

- Battle of Zenta (1697)
- Battle of Chiari (1701)
- Battle of Luzzara (1702)
- Battle of Blenheim (1704)
- Battle of Cassano (1705)
- Battle of Turin (1706)
- Battle of Oudenarde (1708)
- Battle of Malplaquet (1709)
- Battle of Petrovaradin (1716)
- Siege of Belgrade (1717)

Huchtenburg also painted portraits of John Churchill, 1st Duke of Marlborough, who greatly admired his work.

In 1715, he commissioned the widow of Petrus Schenck in Leipzig to sell four of his paintings. In his later years, he lived with his daughter on the Bloemgracht in the Jordaan district of Amsterdam.
