= Jean-Baptiste Martin =

French painter (1659–1735)

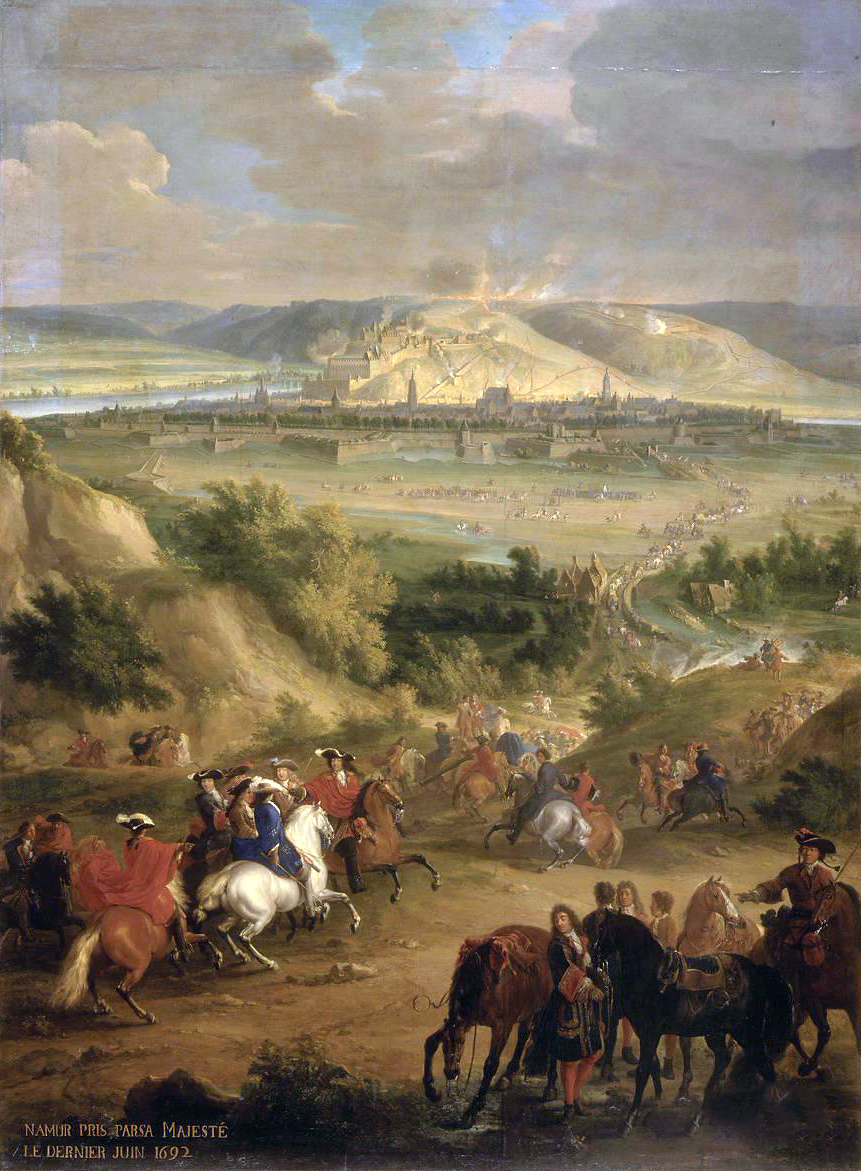
The Siege of Namur

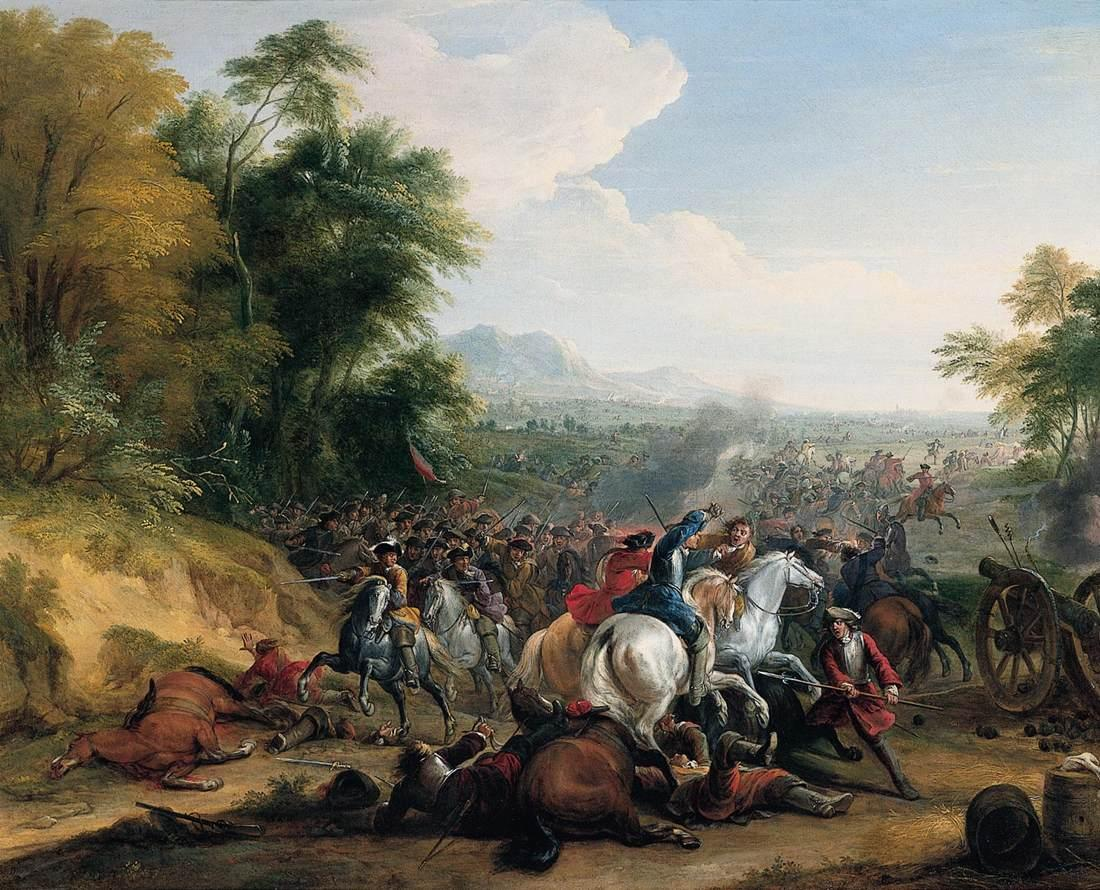
Cavalry Attack

Jean-Baptiste Martin (French pronunciation: [ʒɑ̃ batist maʁtɛ̃]; 1659 – 8 October 1735), known as "Martin des Batailles", was a French painter, decorator and designer who specialized in drawings for tapestries. He was best known for battle scenes, hence his nickname.

== Biography ==
He was born in Paris. His father was a building contractor employed by the Bâtiments du Roi. He began his career in the workshops of the late Laurent de La Hyre, and later worked as a draftsman for Sébastien Le Prestre de Vauban, by whose introduction he became apprenticed to Adam Frans van der Meulen. His style soon came to be almost indistinguishable from Van der Meulen's and, after the latter's death in 1690, Martin and Sauveur Le Conte (another artist who specialized in battle scenes) were charged with completing a series of paintings honoring the achievements of King Louis XIV. That same year, partly in recognition of this work, he was appointed Director of the Gobelins Manufactory, succeeding Van der Meulen.

After Lecomte's premature death in 1695, Martin began to collaborate with Pierre-Denis Martin who (depending on the source consulted) may have been his cousin, nephew or brother. In 1699, they completed a new series of works lauding the achievements of the King, which was installed at the Château de Marly. At this point, he became the official painter for the King's campaigns against the Protestants in Dauphiné, the Siege of Mons and the Siege of Namur.

As a result of his position at Gobelins, many of his drawings and paintings were used for tapestries. He also executed frescoes for four rooms at the Hôtel des Invalides ( vedute depicting fortresses in the Netherlands, Flanders and Alsace). In 1710, he was commissioned by Leopold, Duke of Lorraine, to create a series of works depicting the life of Leopold's father, Charles V, for the Château de Lunéville.

Although famous for painting battles, he also produced landscapes, portraits, still-lifes and historical scenes and helped to reorganize the tapestry manufactory in Nancy. He died in Paris.
