= Marie Duchatel =

Flemish artist (1652–1692)

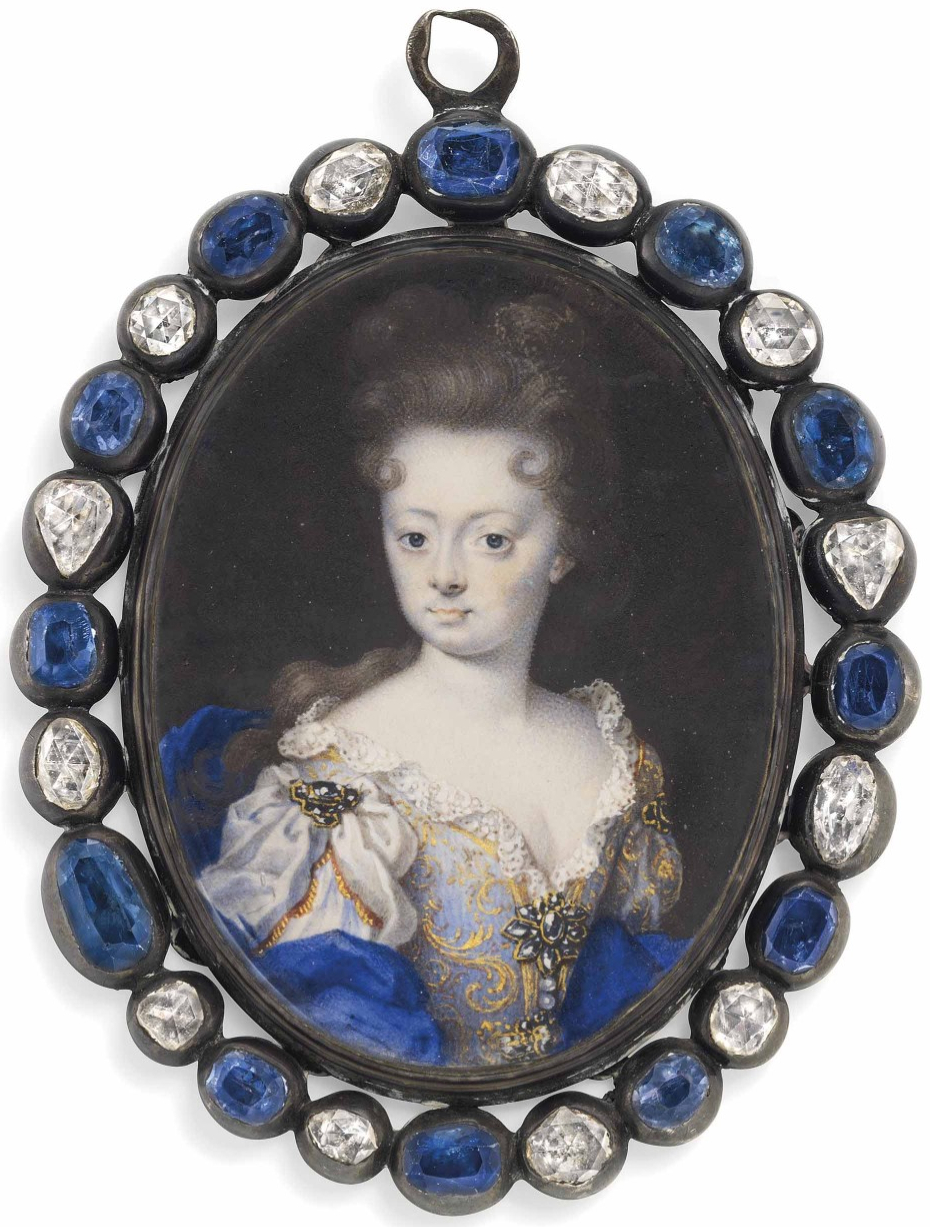
Portrait of Anna Maria Louisa de' Medici attributed to Marie Duchatel

Marie Duchatel also known as Maria Du Chastel (1652–1692) was a Flemish painter and miniaturist. She had an international career which brought her to work at the courts of Denmark and East Frisia. She married the Dutch painter Eglon van der Neer and travelled abroad in his company. She is mainly known for her portraits.

== Life ==
Duchatel was born in Brussels where she was baptized on 20 November 1652. She was the daughter of the Flemish painter François Duchatel and Jeanne Louys. She was trained in painting by her father.

Around 1675 Duchatel visited the Danish court, where she painted the pendant portraits of King Christian V and his wife Charlotte. Around the same time she visited East Frisia. She was given a jewel by Christine Charlotte of Württemberg, a princess consort of George Christian, Prince of East Frisia. She returned to Brussels in 1677 where she likely met her future husband Eglon van der Neer. The couple married around 1680. Their son Johannes van der Neer became a sculptor and was himself the founder of a dynasty of sculptors which flourished in Antwerp until the 19th century.

Between 1689 and 1691, Duchatel accompanied her husband to Düsseldorf, Germany where he was commissioned to portray the princess Maria Anna of Neuburg. She may have assisted him with the portrait. By the end of her time in Germany she was traveling between Düsseldorf and Neuberg acting on matters for the Spanish Crown.

In his biography of her husband, Weyerman mentioned that he lived in an apartment located underneath hers in "the St. Joseph boarding house in the Keyserstraat in Antwerp". Duchatel evidently painted daily and lived apart from her husband.

== Work ==
Duchatel is best known for her miniature portraits. Weyerman commented somewhat disparagingly on her work that she could paint better than she drew.

== Gallery ==
Pair of pendant portraits attributed to Marie Duchatel

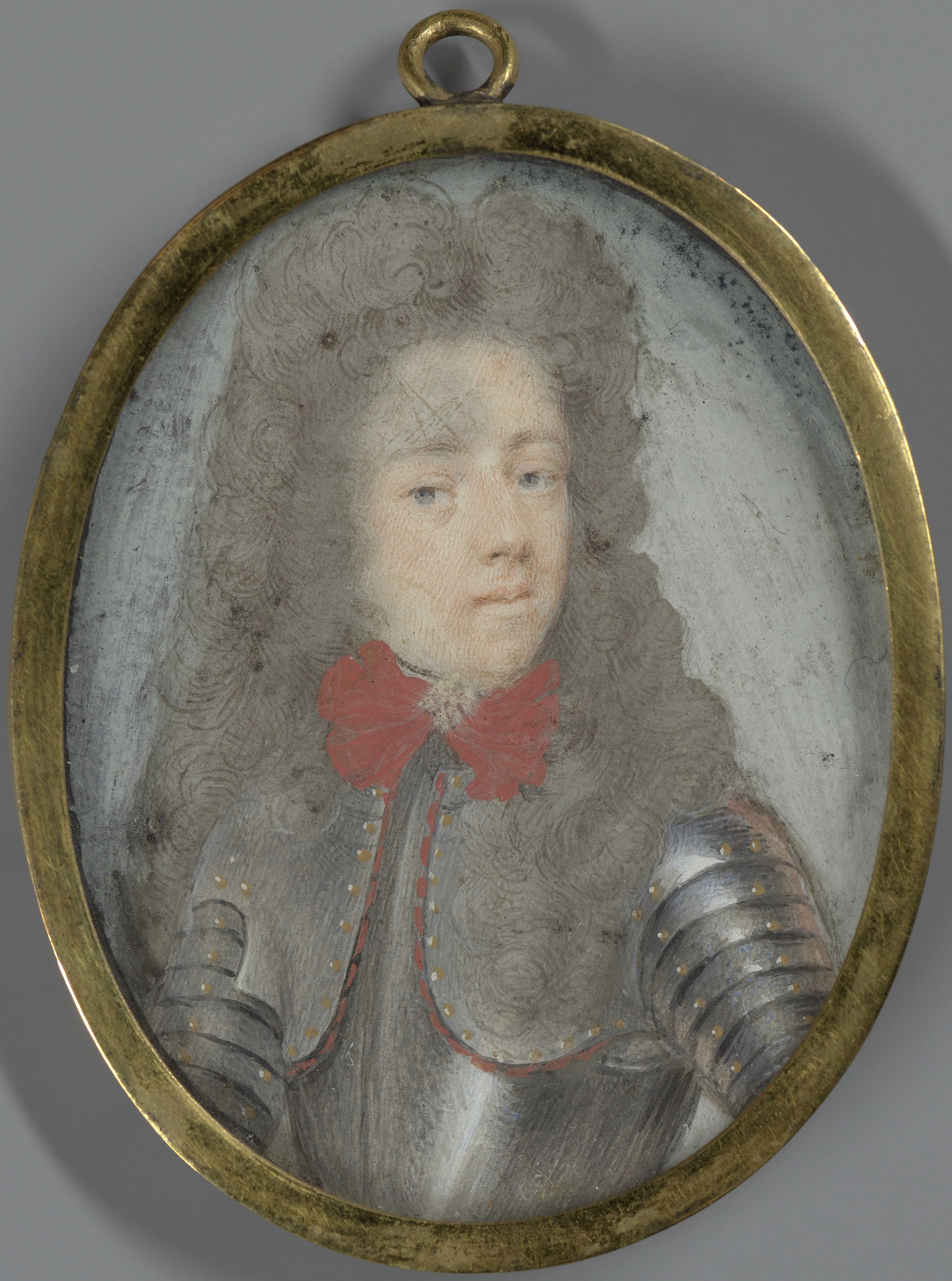
Portrait of Hendrik Casimir II, Prince of Nassau-Dietz

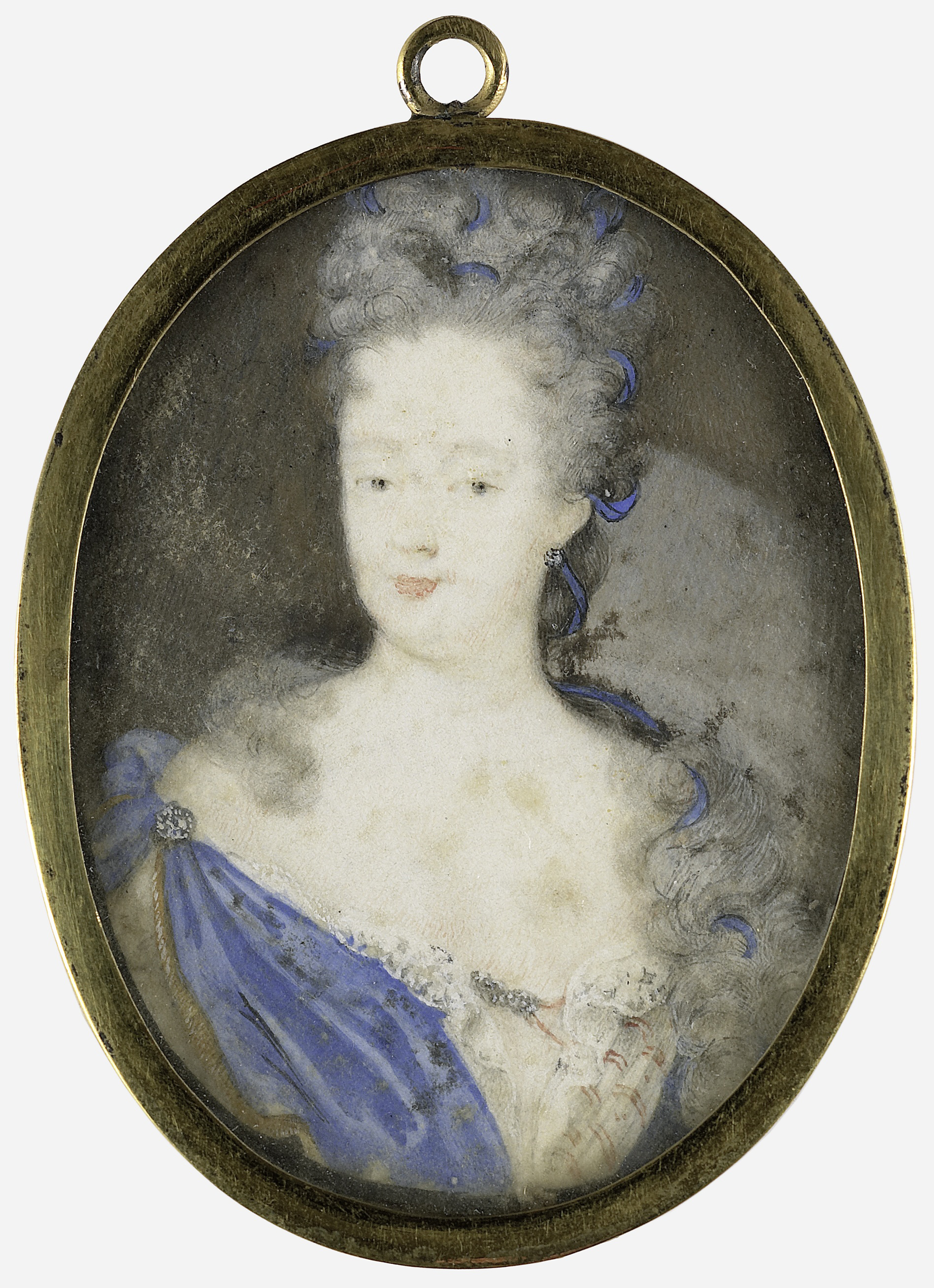
Portrait of Princess Henriëtte Amalia of Anhalt-Dessau
