= François Duchatel =

Flemish painter

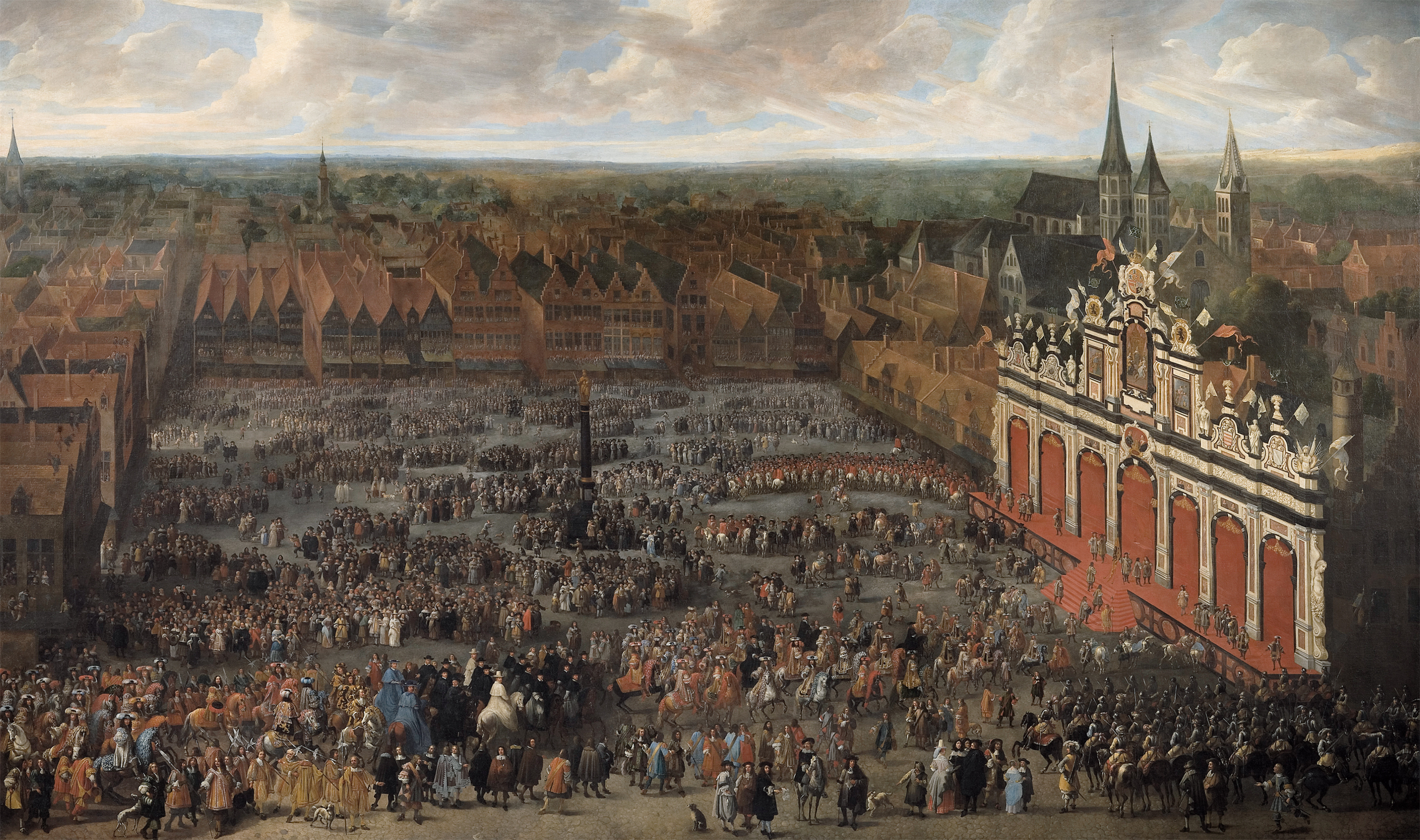
The Inauguration of Charles II, King of Spain, as Count of Flanders in 1666 in Ghent

François Duchatel or du Chastel (1616/1625–1679/1694) was a Flemish painter who worked in Brussels and possibly also in Paris. He is known for his portraits, including of children and groups and genre paintings, including of peasant subjects, tavern interiors and guardroom scenes. He also painted a few large views of historical events and religious scenes.

== Life ==
Little is known about his life, He was likely born in Brussels between 1616 and 1625. Some sources report that he initially served in the cavalry but let this profession after he witnessed the death of his best friend at his side during a battle. It is only then at the age of 27 that he chose the career of an artist. It was traditionally believed that he was a pupil of David Teniers the Younger likely because his paintings of village feasts show some ressamblance with works of that master. There are no records that corroborate such an apprenticeship. He is also mentioned as a pupil of the Antwerp painter Gaspar de Crayer, a native of Antwerp who had moved to Brussels in the early 17th century where he had become a member of the local Guild of Saint Luke in 1607. De Crayer was known for his Counter-Reformation altarpieces and portraits.

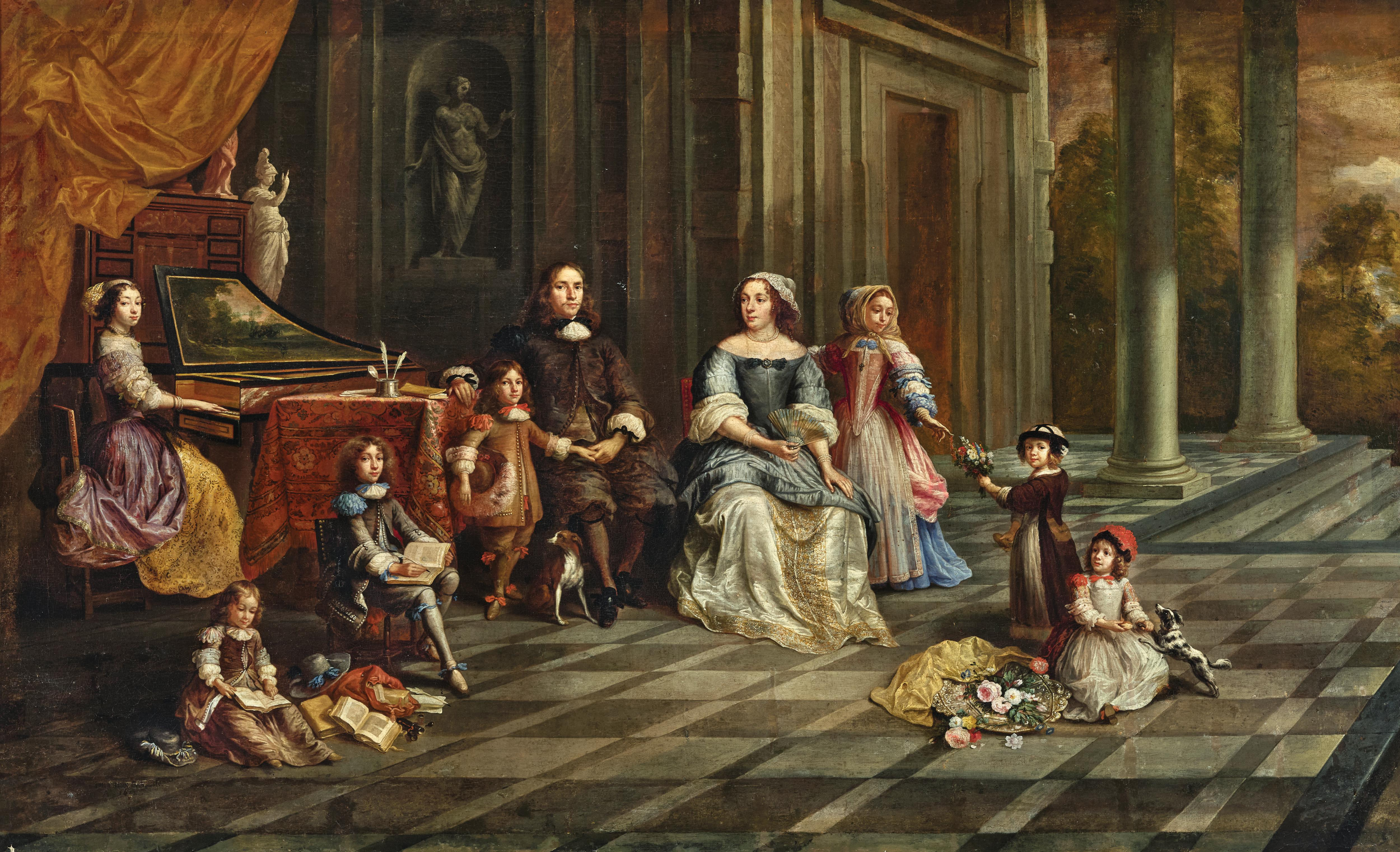
Portrait of the Janssens family

In 1649 he married Jeanne Louys with whom he had seven children. Their eldest daughter became a portrait painter and miniaturist who had an international career. She married the Dutch painter Eglon van der Neer. In January 1654 Gaspar de Crayer and Duchatel sign a contract with the Averbode Abbey to paint a The confession of faith of St. Norbert and the brothers of his order on the Christmas night of 1120.

Some authors state that Duchatel went to Paris where he worked as assistant to the Flemish battle painter Adam Frans van der Meulen. Van der Meulen was a court painter and working under Charles Lebrun on various royal decoration projects as well on designs for the Gobelins Manufactory, the royal tapestry workshop. A number of Flemish artists had been invited to Paris to assist on these projects. There is no documentary evidence that supports Duchatel's presence in Paris or in the entourage of van der Meulen.

His pupils included John Baptist Medina, who became a successful portrait painter in Scotland, and his daughter Marie Duchatel, a miniature painter.

== Work ==
The known work of Duchatel is quite limited. Very few works by the artist are signed and only several others fully documented. Duchatel's portraits are regularly misattributed to other portrait painters of his time such as Gillis van Tilborgh, Charles Emmanuel Biset, Jacob van Oost, and Gonzales Coques. His small family portraits and conversation pieces are close to those of Gonzales Coques, an artist who is referred to as the 'little van Dyck' because of his artistic proximity to and emulation with Anthony van Dyck.

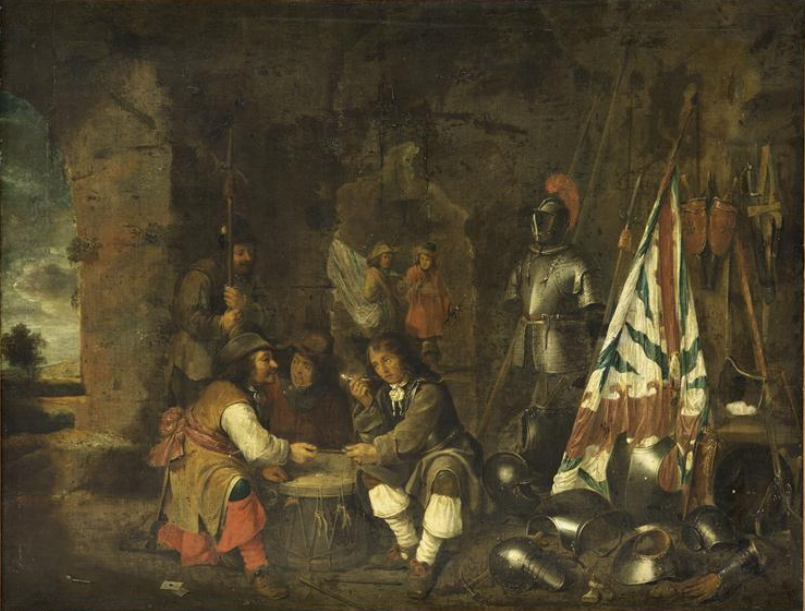
Guardroom scene

He painted genre subjects that were popular in his time. This included guardroom scenes, i.e. paintings that depict officers and soldiers engaged in merrymaking in an interior. These scenes often included mercenaries and prostitutes dividing booty, harassing captives or indulging in other forms of reprehensible activities. This genre was popular in the mid-17th century, particularly in the Dutch Republic. In Flanders there were also a few practitioners of the genre including David Teniers the Younger, Abraham Teniers, Anton Goubau, Cornelis Mahu and Jan Baptist Tijssens the Younger. The Guardroom Scene by Duchatel in the Musée Jeanne d'Aboville depicts a guardroom with some soldiers sitting around a round table gambling and smoking. On the right side of the room there are pieces of armour on the floor, a war standard leaning against a wall and various swords hanging from a wall. The armour depicted in the two pictures was already out of date at the time it was painted since metal armours, breast plates and helmets fell out of use from the 1620s. It is possible that in line with the moralizing intent of the genre, the armour is a reference to the vanitas motif of the transience of power and fame.

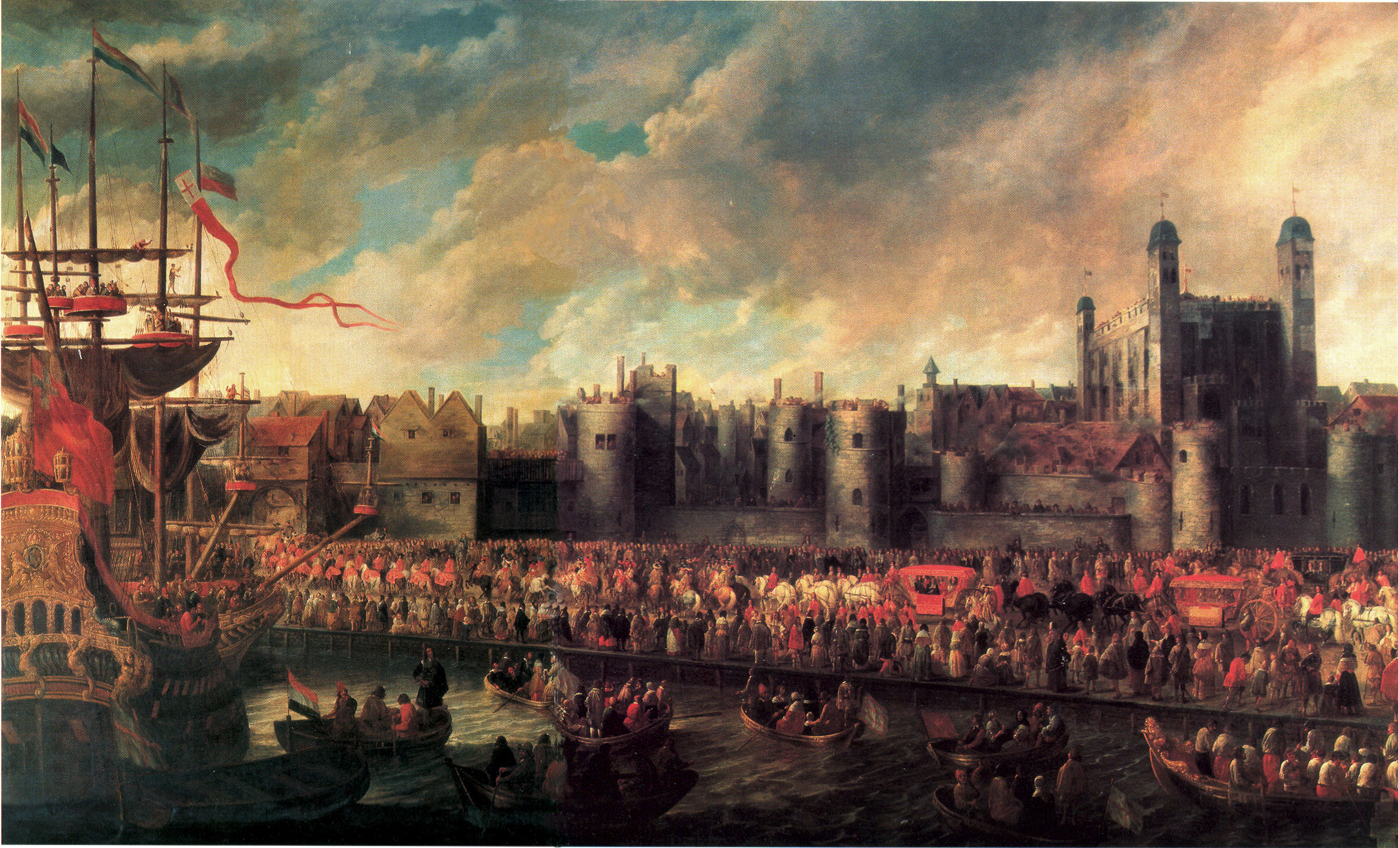
The entry of the Prince de Ligne in London, 1660

Some of his most original works depict important historical events on large canvases with many figures. This includes 'The Inauguration of Charles II, King of Spain, as Count of Flanders, in 1666 in Ghent' ) (Museum of Fine Arts, Ghent). It is dated 1668. Around the same time Lucas Vorsterman II engraved a plate after a design by Jacob van Werden which depicts a very similar scene and composition. Duchatel's work shows a view of the Vrijdagmarkt (Friday Square) of Ghent with crowds of people and soldiers. A cavalcade is advancing from left to right on the foreground. It is led by the governor general followed by a suit of Flemish aristocrats, magistrates and high clergy in their colourful clothes of the period. Many of the figures have their head turned towards the viewer and have been painted as true portraits. In the center front, Duchatel has included a self-portrait holding a piece of paper on which are written his name and the date 1668. Standing on his right are two of his artist friends. On his left is another artist friend on horseback and another person on his feet who is probably the city architect. The work shows his ability to depict large groups of people in movement. Duchatel painted a number of other paintings of large official events such as The entry into London of the Prince de Ligne in 1660 (Château de Belœil), which shows a large view of the arrival of the new Spanish ambassador after The Restoration of Charles II of England. The Spanish ambassador, the Prince de Ligne, embarks at Tower Wharf. The artist sketches the scene and his secretary records the events in a diary. Linked to this work is the composition Charles II receives the Spanish Ambassador, Claude-Lamoral, Prince de Ligne, in 1660, which is also attributed to Duchatel. It shows the ceremony three days after the ambassador's arrival in London when he presents his credentials to Charles II at Whitehall. The ambassador wears a dress heavy with embroidery. The followers in his suite are dressed in flame coloured livery with yellow and silver trimmings and hats with feathers. King Charles II stands on a dais with a gold-trimmed red chair of state behind him to receive the ambassador and his young son.
