= Adam Frans van der Meulen =

Flemish painter and draughtsman (1632–1690)

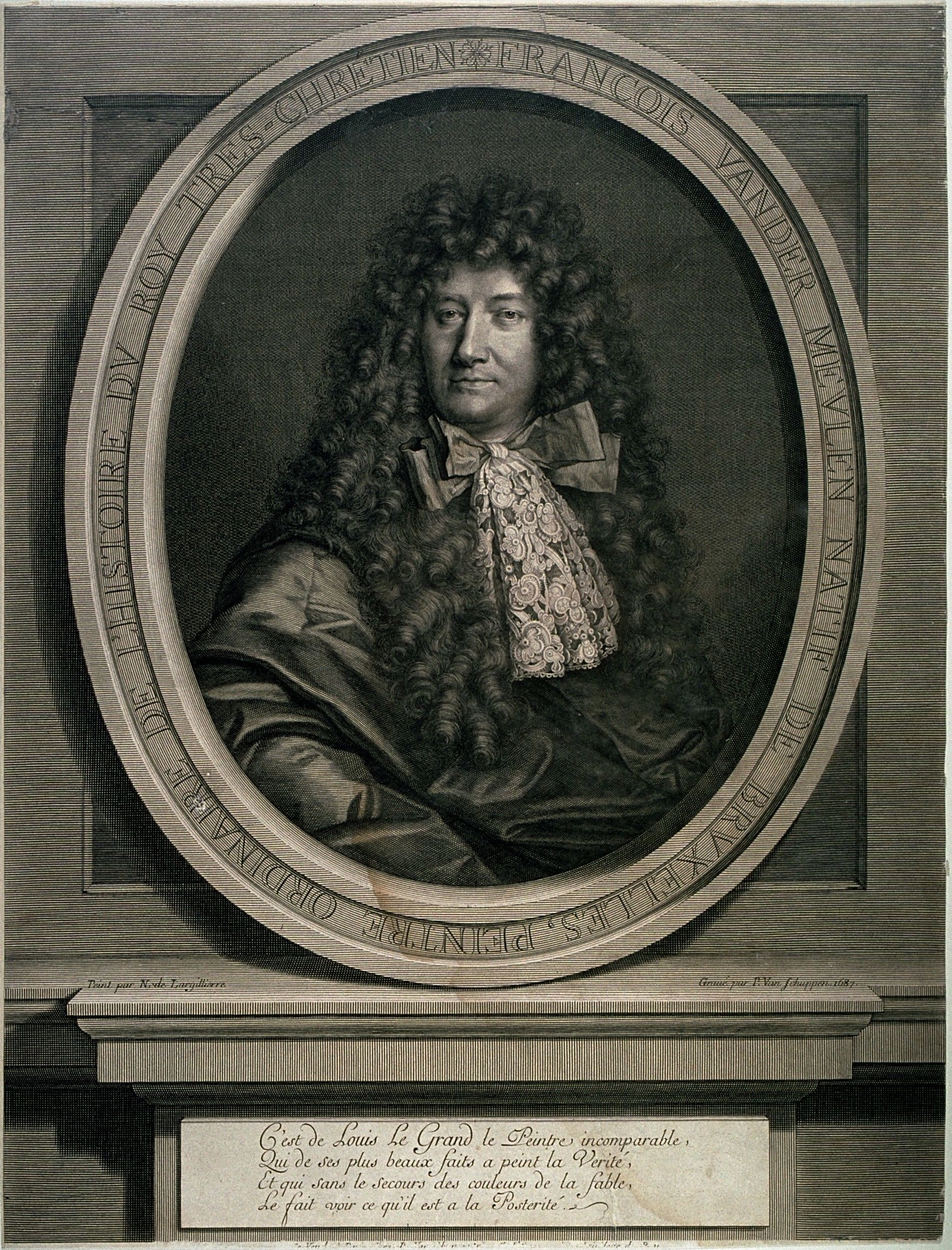
- Portrait engraved by Pieter van Schuppen after design by Nicolas de Largillière
- Born: 1632; Brussels
- Died: 1690 (aged 57–58); Paris
- Known for: Painting, tapestry design
- Movement: Baroque

Adam Frans van der Meulen or Adam-François van der Meulen (11 January 1632 – 15 October 1690) was a Flemish painter and draughtsman who was particularly known for his scenes of military campaigns and conquests. Van der Meulen also painted portraits, hunting scenes, paintings of chateaux and landscapes. He created designs for prints and cartoons for tapestries.

He worked in the service of the French king Louis XIV for whom he painted his victories, his new possessions and portraits. He was instrumental in building the propagandistic image of the French king as the 'Sun King'. His battle scenes had an important influence on the development on the genre of military painting in France.

== Life ==
Adam Frans van der Meulen was born in Brussels where he was baptized on 11 January 1632. He was the eldest of the seven children of Pieter van der Meulen and his second wife Maria van Steenwegen. His father was a respected notary. He was registered on 5 March 1651 at the Brussels Guild of Saint Luke as the pupil of Peter Snayers. Snayers was a painter from Antwerp who had moved to Brussels to work for the court. He specialized in pictures of battles, attacks on convoys and civilians and hunting scenes. Van der Meulen became a master of the Guild of Saint Luke in Brussels on 5 March 1651.

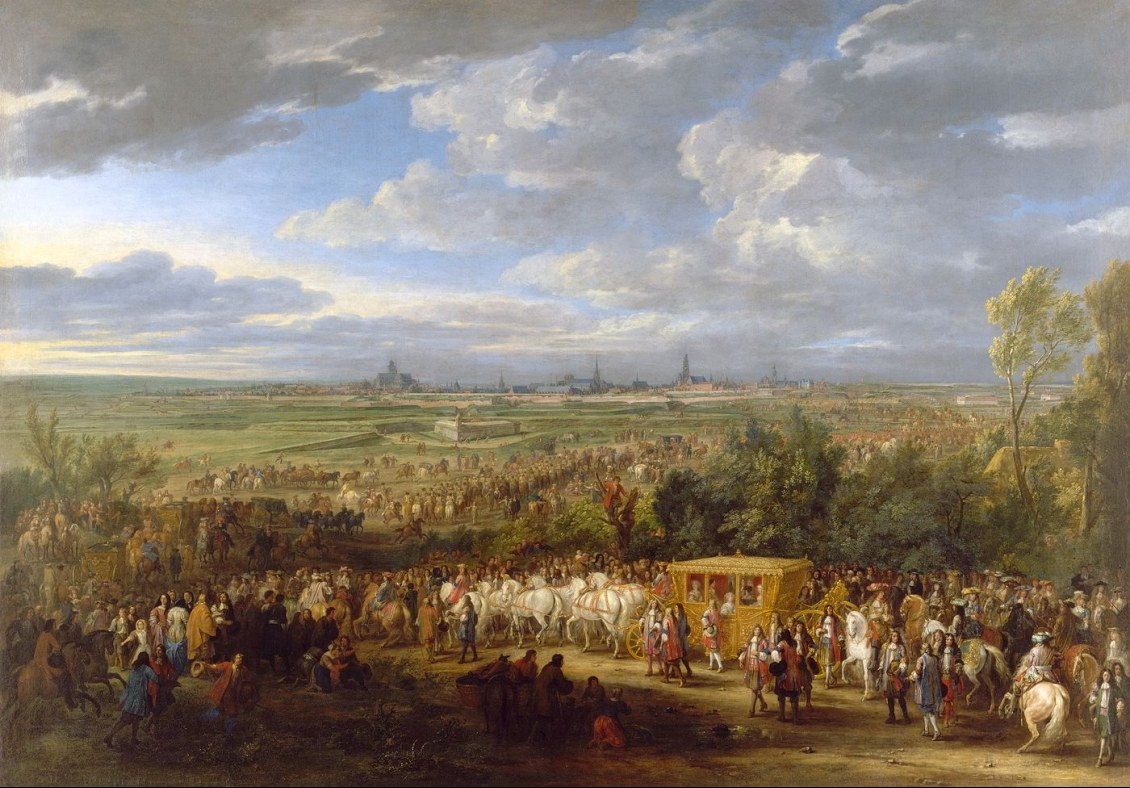
The entry of King Louis XIV and Queen Maria-Theresa in Arras on 30 July 1667

Van der Meulen's earliest works dealt with the same subject matter as those of his master Snayers, in particular cavalry skirmishes. He was also known for depicting courtly retinues mounted on their horses. His reputation for this type of scene as well as his skill in the painting of horses reached France. This led to the artist being called to Paris where he entered into the service of Louis XIV on 1 April 1664. Jean-Baptiste Colbert, the powerful surintendant des Bâtiments, Arts et Manufactures (Superintendent of Buildings, Arts and Manufactures) and later minister of finance, is believed to have been behind the royal appointment of van der Meulen. Colbert had been charged with immortalizing the military successes of Louis XIV. To achieve this propagandistic purpose, he had come up with the idea to create a series of tapestries that would show the heroic deeds of the king.

The court painter (Premier peintre du roi) Charles Le Brun had been put in charge of the Gobelins Manufactory, the royal tapestry works newly created in 1663, and was officially appointed its director on 8 March 1663. To realize Colbert's project of a series of tapestries on the king's military campaigns, Le Brun sought to surround himself with a team of painters who would be capable of translating his ideas into tapestries and van der Meulen was recruited to assist Le Brun in this project. Van der Meulen's varied skills were particularly appreciated for this purpose. Van der Meulen's reputation as a skilled painter of horses has been cited as one of the reasons why he was solicited to work in France.

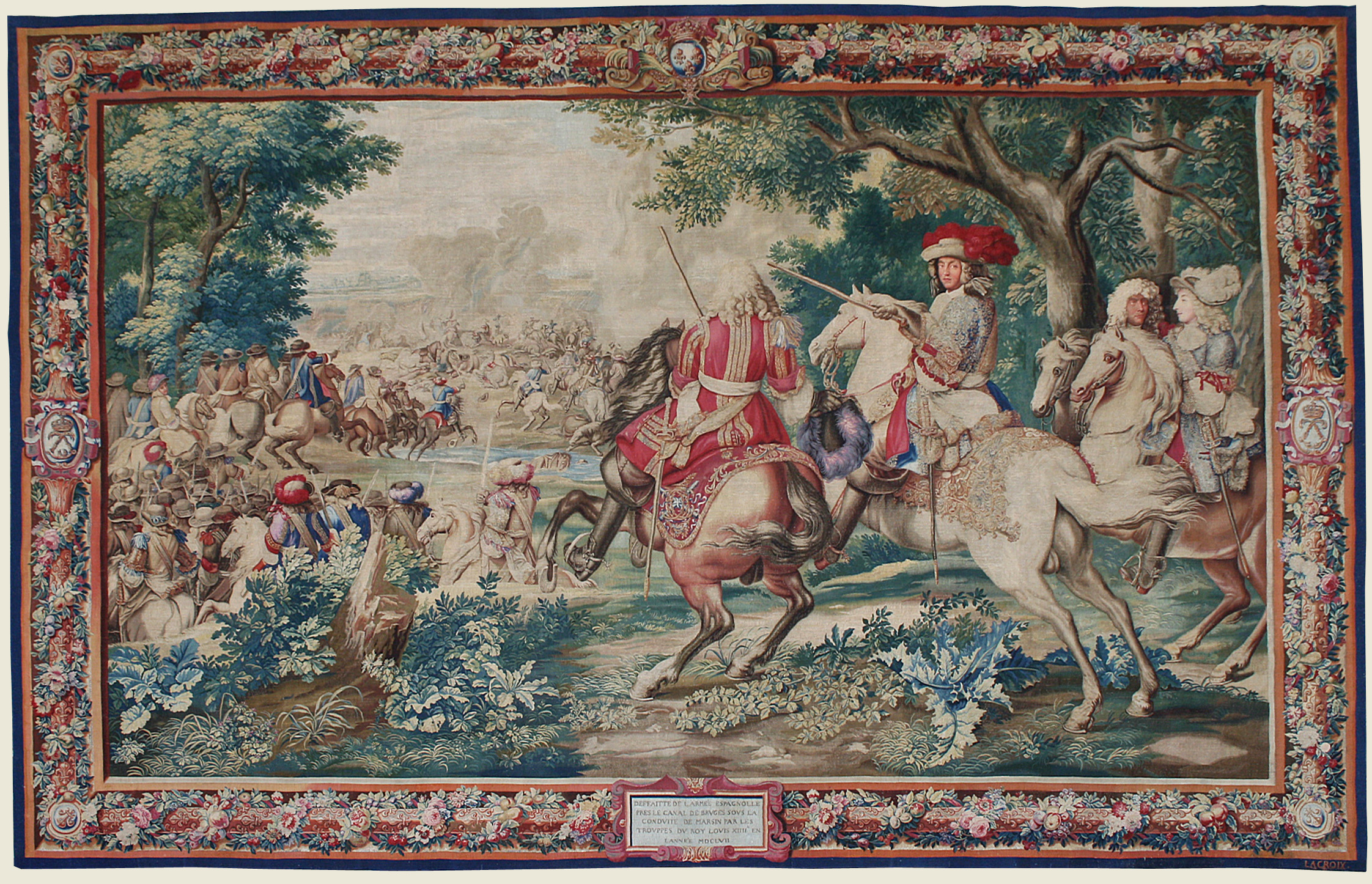
The defeat of the Count of Marsin

Van der Meulen was involved in the design of multiple tapestry series. He first worked on the series of The History of the King for which he created the scenes of the military conquests. As the design work involved a lot of work, van der Meulen invited other Flemish artists to assist him with his designs. The landscape artist Adriaen Frans Boudewijns entered in 1666 into a 3-year contract to work in the service of Adam Frans van der Meulen. When van der Meulen worked on the design of 12 Gobelins representing the months for King Louis XIV, van der Meulen executed the smaller figures and part of the landscapes while the remainder of the landscapes was completed by Boudewijns and Abraham Genoels, another Flemish painter active in Paris. While in Paris, Boudewijns also engraved many of van der Meulen's compositions. Boudewijns married the sister of van der Meulen called Barbe or Barbara on 12 January 1670. From 1668 van der Meulen worked on the series of tapestries called the 'Maisons royales' ('Royal Residences') depicting the various palaces of the king.

Van der Meulen's career in France took off rapidly. His annual wages at the Gobelins Manufactory were regularly increased and he was in 1666 one of its best-paid artists. He accompanied Louis XIV during his campaign through Flanders during the War of Devolution. He made drawings of various cities including Turnhout, Kortrijk, Oudenaarde, Aalst and Lille. His paintings representing the campaigns of Flanders in 1667 so delighted the King that from that date van der Meulen was ordered to accompany him on all his expeditions. He accompanied le Grand Condé during his campaign through Bourgogne-Franche-Comté.

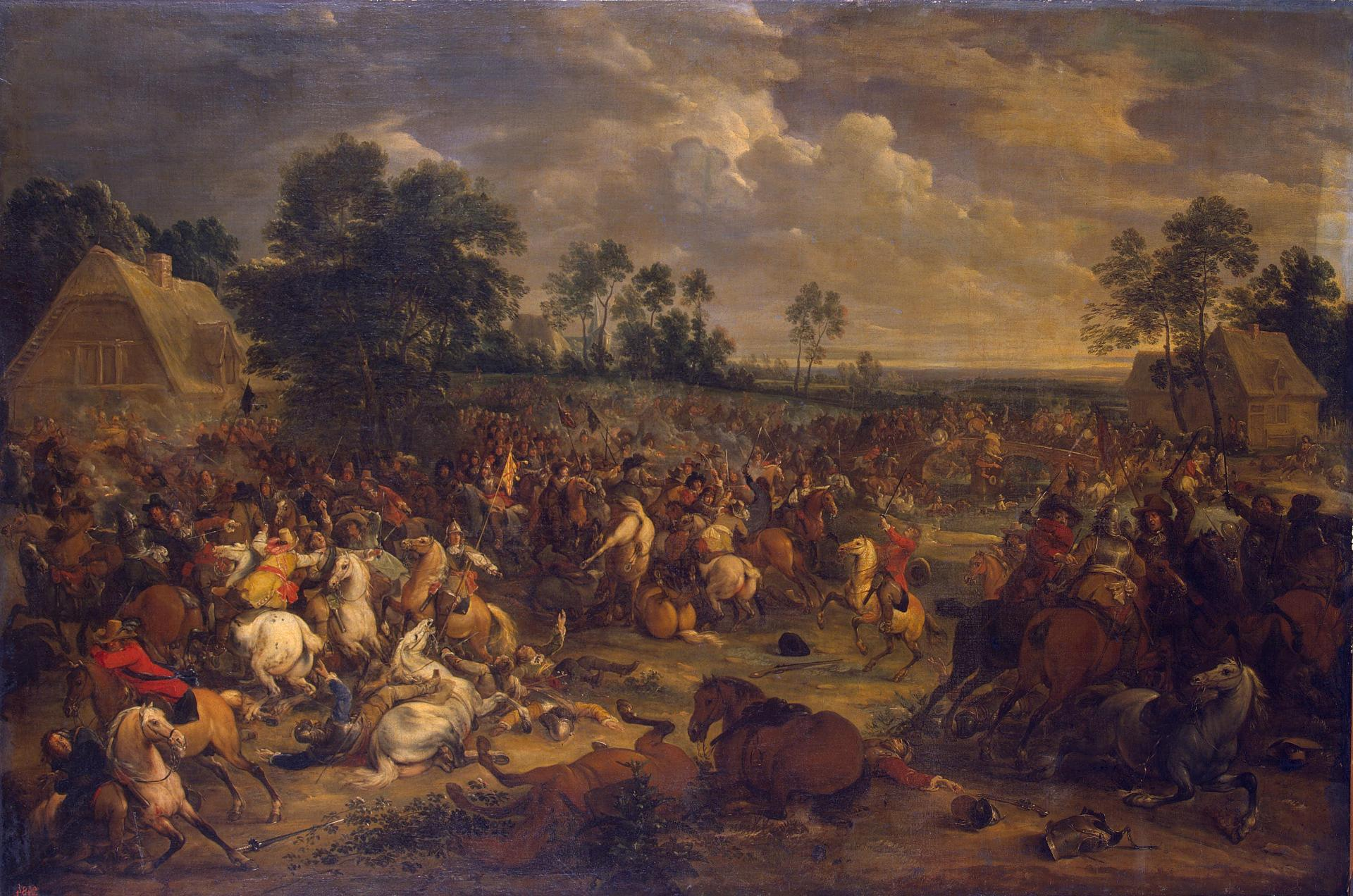
Battle scene, 1657

He obtained in 1669 the royal privilege to have his works engraved. He was appointed peintre ordinaire du Roy (ordinary painter to the king) in 1673. In the same year he was received into the Académie royale de peinture et de sculpture (Royal Academy of Painting and Sculpture) without having to submit a reception piece as was usually the case. He attained the grade of councilor in the Academy in 1681 and that of principal councilor in 1688.

Van der Meulen made a total of nine trips to document King Louis XIV's military campaigns. He enjoyed all kinds of facilities at his job: he had his own coach, took his meals with the officers, and had an assistant called Jean Paul who helped him with the drawings. This assistant artist has remained unidentified and was referred to by van der Meulen as 'mon homme' ('my man') without further specification. Van der Meulen followed in 1673 Louis XIV during the Franco-Dutch War, accompanied by Jean Paul. The two artist made drawings of about 32 cities that were conquered by the French during the campaign. Later he also made drawings of Blois, Amboise and Chambord in France. He further worked in Maastricht in 1674 and in Flanders between April 1676 and 1677. In the wake of further campaigns in Flanders by generals le Grand Condé and Henri de la Tour d'Auvergne, Vicomte de Turenne he visited along with Le Brun and André Le Nôtre in 1677 Cambrai, Valenciennes, Saint-Omer, Mont Cassel and Cassel.

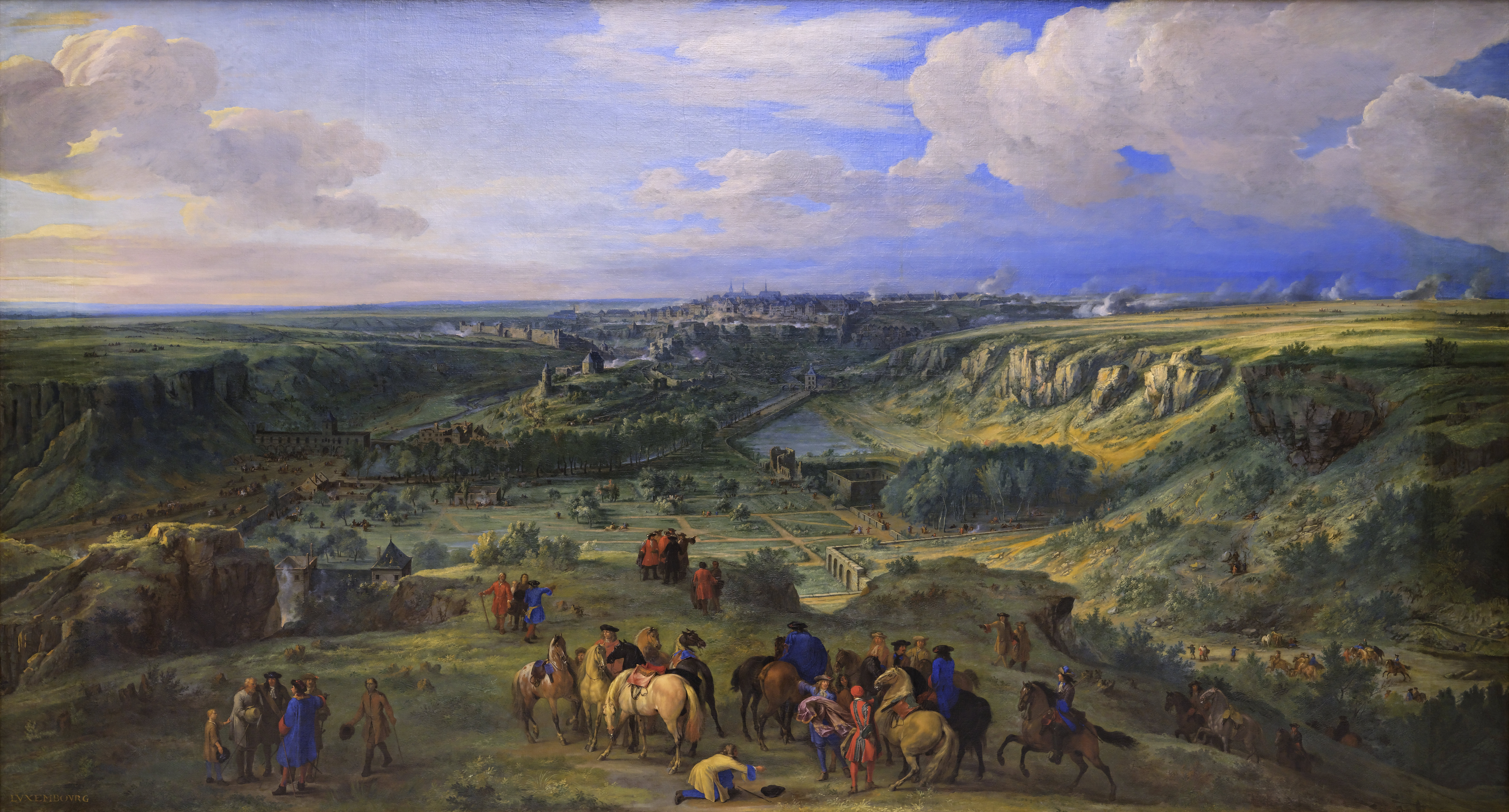
View of the City of Luxemburg from the baths of Mansfeld (taken on 3 June 1684)

In 1679 he was commissioned to picture the new French territories, which were allocated after the Peace of Nijmegen. During this trip he met the Flemish landscape painter Cornelis Huysmans near Dinant. He tried to convince Huysmans to join him in Paris as a designer at the Gobelins Manufactory but Huysmans declined. Later that year he was in Dinant and in the years 1681 and 1682 he was in Strasbourg where he drew the newly acquired French possessions of Strasbourg and Lorraine.

Van der Meulen had married Catharine Huseweel before he moved to France. The couple had several children. One son, Louis who was born on 20 March 1669 was baptized on 27 March 1669 in the chapel of the Tuileries by the archbishop of Nazianze and coadjutor of Reims and had King Louis XIV as godfather and Anne Marie Louise d'Orléans, Duchess of Montpensier as godmother. His first wife died in January 1677. On 22 March 1679 he signed a marriage contract with Catherine Lobry, daughter of a captain of the guard of Count Bassigni. She died already on 4 October 1680. He married 20-year-old Marie de Bye, a cousin of Charles Le Brun on 12 January 1681. The couple had many children of whom one was born posthumously.

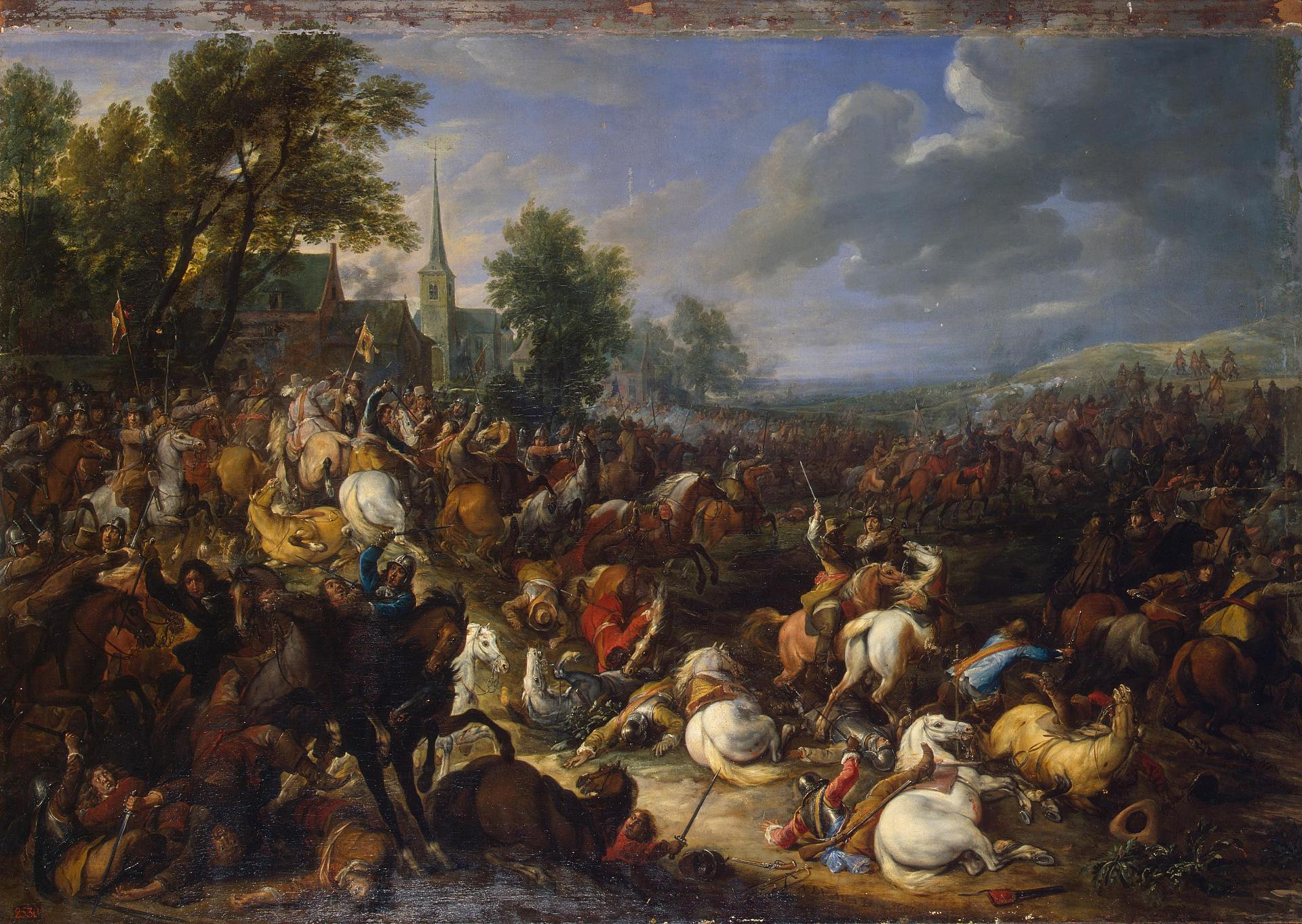
Cavalry in battle, 1657

He painted the designs for the decorations of the Ambassadors Staircase, the grand staircase of the King's apartment at Versailles (four trompe l'oeil tapestries representing the taking of various towns, 1677). From 1679 he worked on the large-scale paintings of The King's Conquests (Les conquêtes du Roi) intended for the decoration of the Royal Pavilion of Marly on which he worked until his death in 1690. Marly was a new pleasure residence built for the King as an architectural fantasy, with twelve little pavilions and elegant Royal Pavilion laid out on a square plan. The four apartments of the pavilion were separated by vestibules with as only decoration two marble tables with above them two large paintings of The King's Conquests by van der Meulen. Van der Meulen was commissioned by Anne Marie Louise d'Orléans, Duchess of Montpensier to create smaller replicas of his paintings of conquests to decorate the Château de Choisy (1680-1688), and then by Louvois to decorate the Château de Meudon.

He died in Paris in 1690. After his death, seals were affixed to his apartment and studio, as had been the case at the time of Le Brun's death a short time before, since Louis XIV asserted his royal privilege. As van der Meulen was an ordinary painter to the King, and resided at the Manufacture des Gobelins, the sovereign ordered a number of works to be seized, which he thought proper to be returned to him.

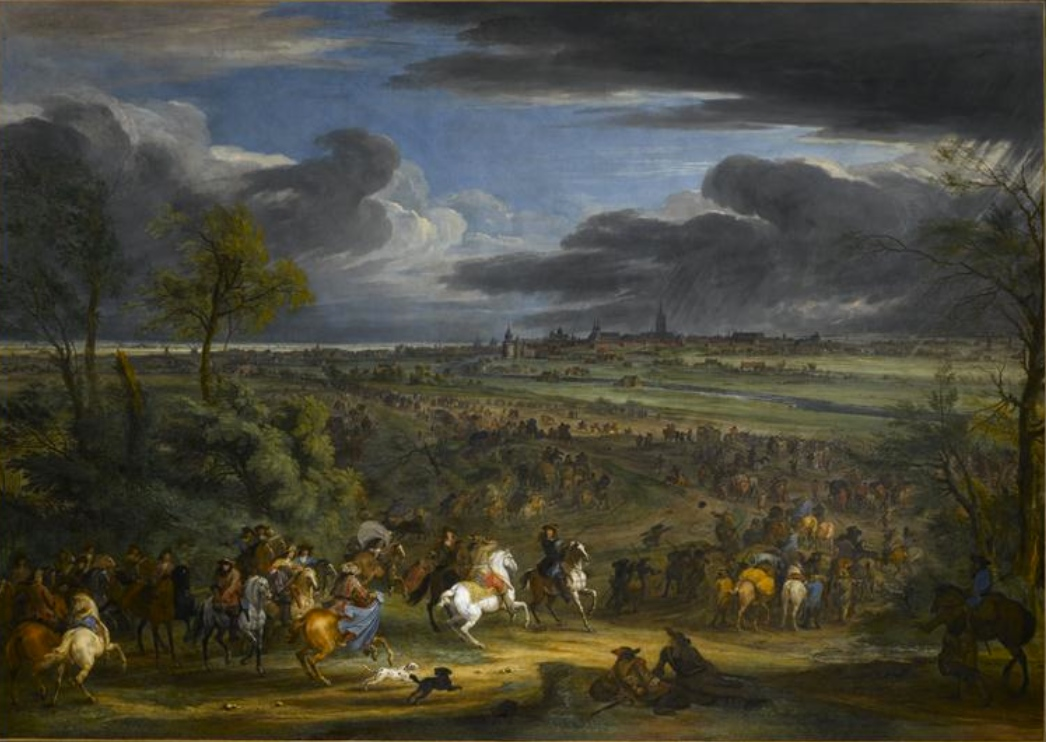
View of the march of the king's army on Kortrijk on 18 July 1667

His pupils and workshop assistants included Saveur Lecomte, Mathieu Dufresnet, Dominicus Nollet, Gérard Jean Baptiste Scotin (II), Nicolas de Largillière, Jan van Huchtenburg, Jean-Baptiste Martin and François Duchatel.

== Work ==
Van der Meulen was one of the foremost battle painters of his time. He is also known for his many topographical drawings, which he made as preparations for his battle pieces. He painted equestrian portraits and painted and drew many animal studies. His works always retained their Flemish character in terms of color, although his style was modified by that of the French school.

The most important portion of van der Meulen's work is made up of battle scenes. His early works in this genre were close in style to those of his master Pieter Snayers. These early works from the 1650s depicted scenes of fighting horsemen. Like Snayers he frequently represented a village under attack.

These works relish in the depiction of the whirling melee of horsemen and horses itself, as if in distant response to Leonardo's The Battle of Anghiari.

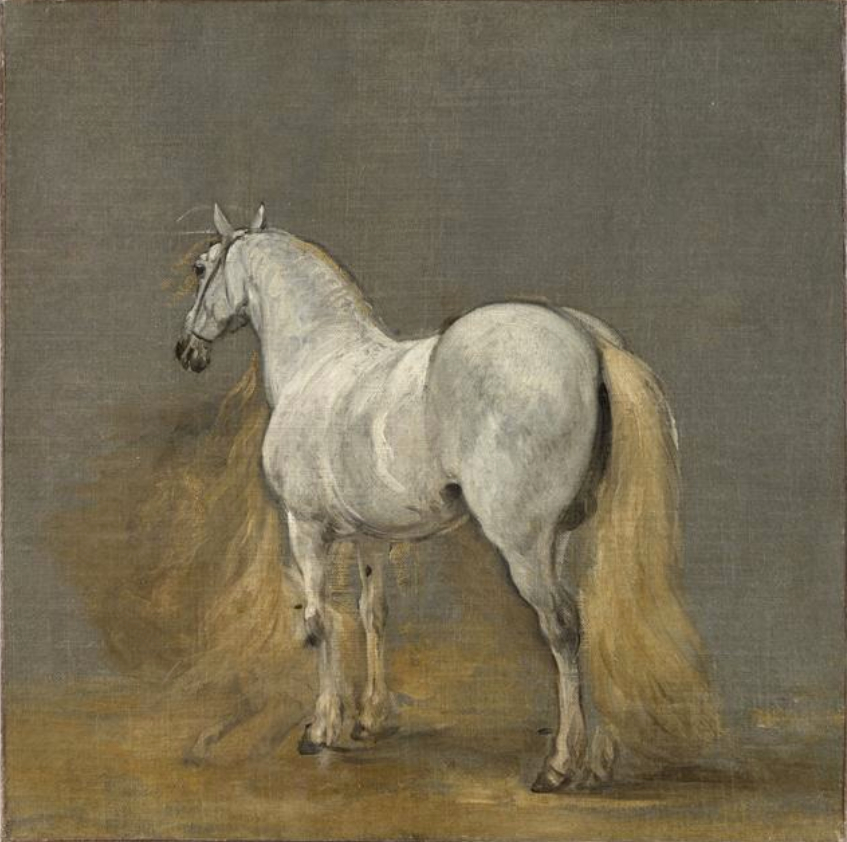
Study of a white horse

After moving to France and becoming the official war artist of Louis XIV during the multiple military French campaigns in Europe of the late 17th century, van der Meulen developed a new approach to his depictions of battles. He excluded the horror and morbid rawness of the events. Rather than concentrate on the heat of the action from close up, he used the compositional device of a crowded elevated foreground behind which there is a plunging wide panoramic landscape. The characters whom the artist aims to give the key role in the scene are placed on a mound in the foreground, often mounted on horseback to give them more dignity. On a second plane is typically depicted the supposed movement of the troops and in a third and last plane the profile of the city being attacked. The action is depicted in receding planes accentuated by the folds of the terrain, the alternation of zones of shadow and light and the gradual fading of the light, which marks a view towards a city in the distance. The use of the same compositional scheme gives an impression of unity to many of his paintings as only the profile of the city is different. The uniformity of these compositions can be explained by their use for political purposes. Nevertheless, the paintings of the artist were always praised for their beauty and their use for the decoration of the Royal Château de Marly, for the vestibules as well as for the rooms, shows the fully decorative virtue of his animated and varied landscapes.

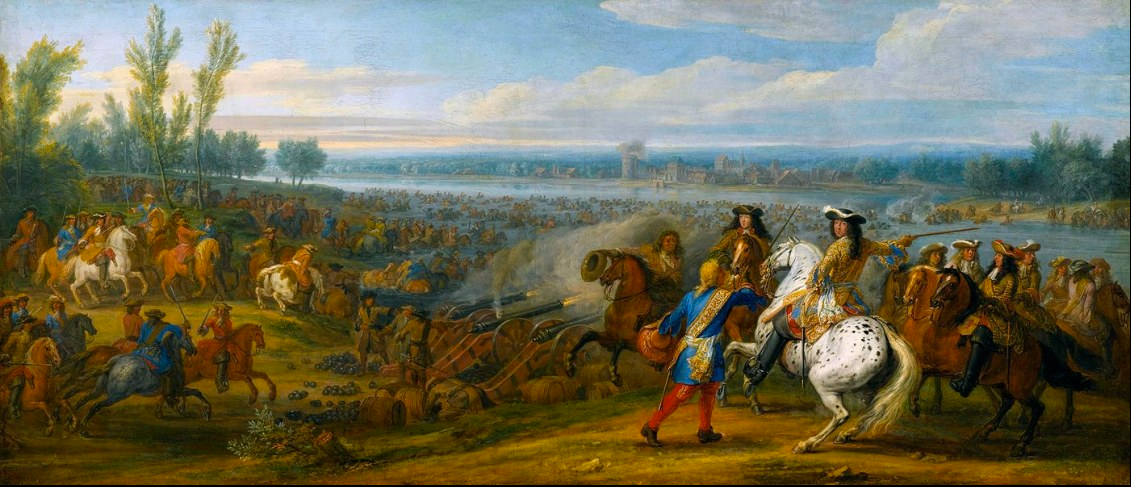
The crossing of the Rhine on 12 June 1672

The features of his style are clearly visible in the large cycle of paintings of Les conquêtes du Roi made for the Château de Marly. One of the most popular compositions in this series was the one depicting The crossing of the Rhine on 12 June 1672. Many versions of this composition exist, made with different levels of involvement of his workshop (the Louvre, Musée des Beaux-Arts de Caen, Musée des Beaux-Arts de Dijon, Rijksmuseum, Philadelphia Museum of Art, Palace of Versailles, private collections). The event depicted is the crossing of the Rhine by the French troops during the Franco-Dutch War. The crossing did not involve any military engagement with the Dutch troops and solely involved the French troops wading through the Rhine when the water was low. Nevertheless, this event was described in contemporary French propaganda as a feat equal to those of Alexander the Great and Emperor Constantine the Great. Many writers and visual artists eulogized the French king for this exploit. The various depictions misrepresent, however, the actual history of the event. Louis XIV was in fact not present at the crossing of the Rhine as he was at the time staying with his brother Philippe I, Duke of Orléans in the monastery in Elterberg. Van der Meulen's paintings of the crossing of the Rhine, which show Louis XIV in the foreground commanding the action are thus a conscious misrepresentation of history for propaganda purposes.

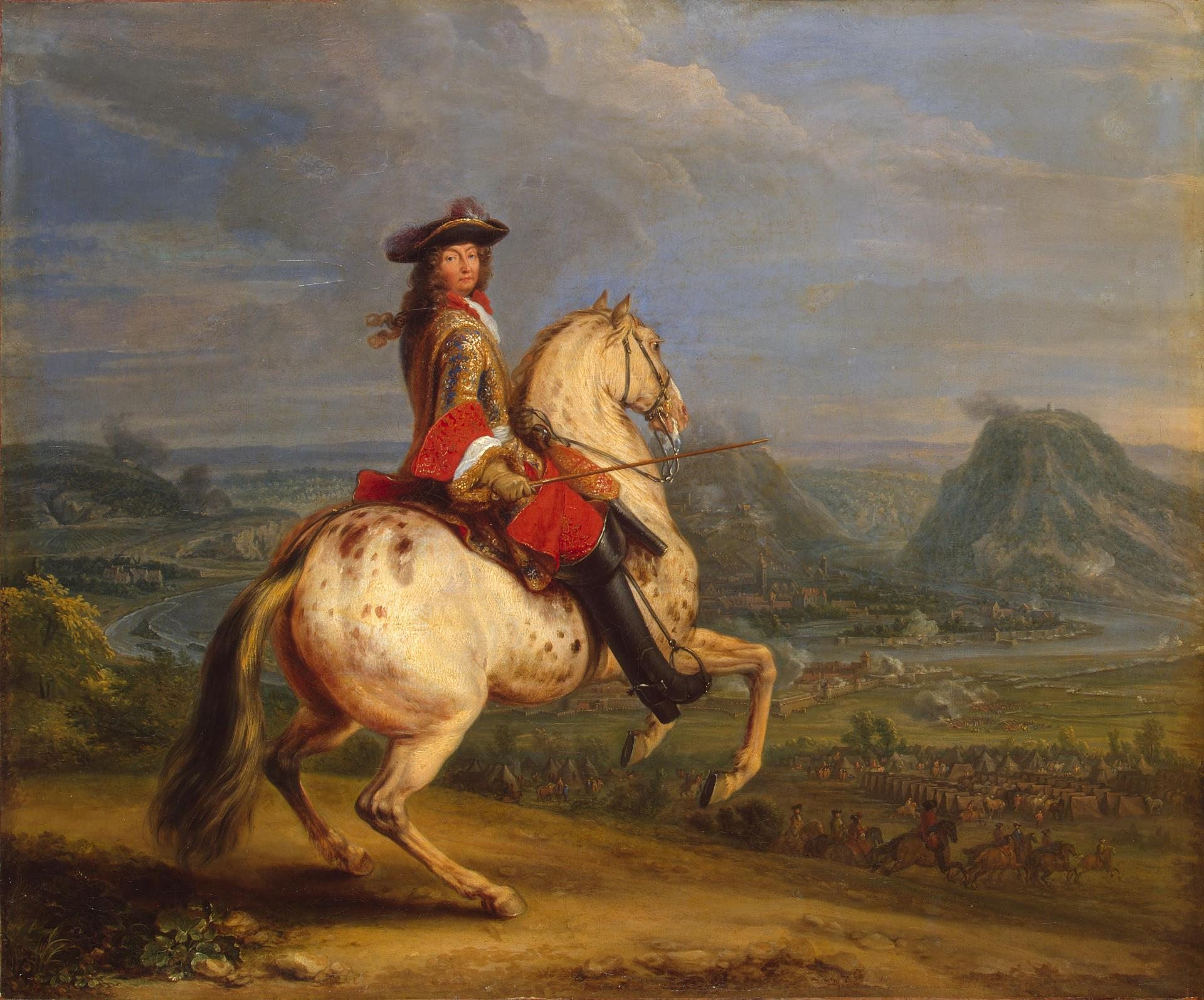
Louis XIV at the Siege of Besançon in 1674

In the version in the Louvre van der Meulen has placed Louis XIV at the heart of the event, in the immediate vicinity of danger, thus emphasizing the King's courage and power. The King eclipses the other personages: his brother Philippe I, Duke of Orléans and le Grand Condé who had planned the maneuver, are placed behind the sovereign. A similar propagandistic purpose was present in the prints that were made after van der Meulen's designs. The inscriptions underneath the prints made after The King's Conquests were written by Claude-François Ménestrier, a French heraldist and Jesuit who was an attendant of the royal court. These inscriptions invariably highlight the direct involvement of the French king in the glorious events being depicted and thus go beyond a simple description of the events. It is clear that the contemporary perception was that these works were made to preserve the memory of the King's military feats for posterity. The engraved portrait of van der Meulen created by Pieter van Schuppen after a painting by Nicolas de Largillière confirms this. Underneath the portrait of the painter appears the following inscription, which does not mention van der Meulen, but rather speaks of the King as a painter: 'C'est de Louis Le Grand le Peintre incomparable, Qui de ses plus beaux faits a peint la verité, Et qui sans le secours des couleurs de la fable, Le Fait Voir ce qu'il est a la Posterité.' ('It is of Louis the Great, the incomparable painter, who has painted the truth with his beautiful deeds and without the aid of the colours of fables, shows what he is to posterity').

The various versions depict the King in the company of different personages although they are placed in the same place in the composition. It is possible that these variations were made at the behest of the patron for whom a particular version was created. The cycle of paintings made for the Château de Marly were very successful. They led to a fashion for decorating palaces and public buildings with paintings representing military scenes.

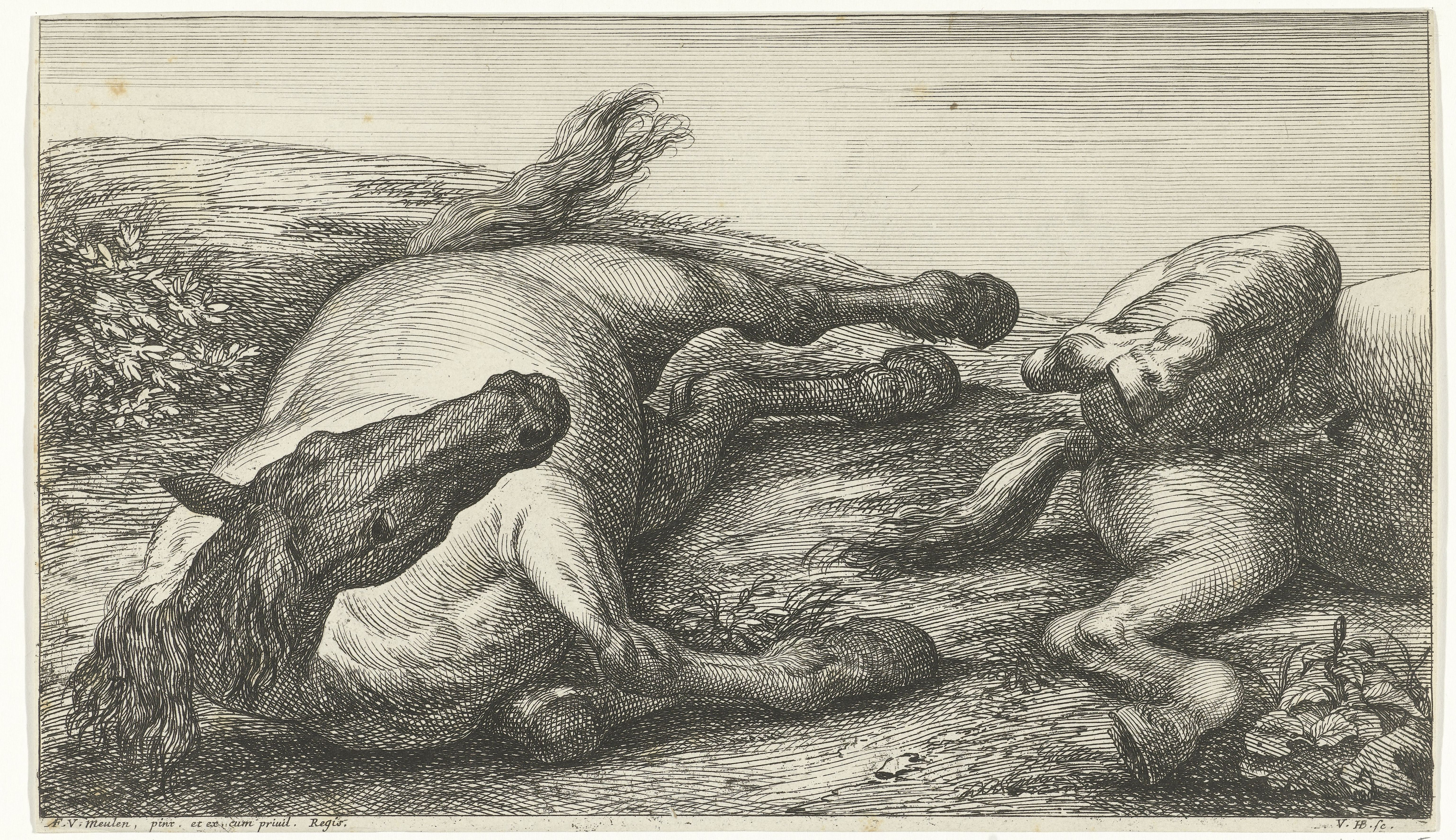
Horse lying on its right side

The process in which the large compositions were created has been studied by art historians. It is known that van der Meulen was present at some of the military actions that he depicted. He also visited the locations of the actions afterwards and spent much time making topographical sketches of the landscapes and cities that were depicted in his battle scenes. He often relied on other artists to assist with these sketches. He even used prints by other artists as a basis for his compositions as in the case of his painting of the siege of Utrecht. The views of Utrecht in the painting are very similar to prints of Utrecht by the Dutch painter Herman Saftleven. Van der Meulen integrated these views and profiles into his vast compositions. They were also used for the design of tapestries as well as for prints. Research has shown that a number of prints depicting Louis XIV's conquests were made before the paintings depicting the same scenes were made. In other words, some of the prints were the basis for the later paintings rather than the other way around.

Van der Meulen also painted several studies of horses. His studies of horses constituted a directory that the painter could use in his compositions as well as serve as models for his apprentices. The Dutch engraver Jan van Huchtenburg engraved a series of his sketches of horses killed in combat. Van der Meulen enjoyed a reputation for his skill at painting horses.

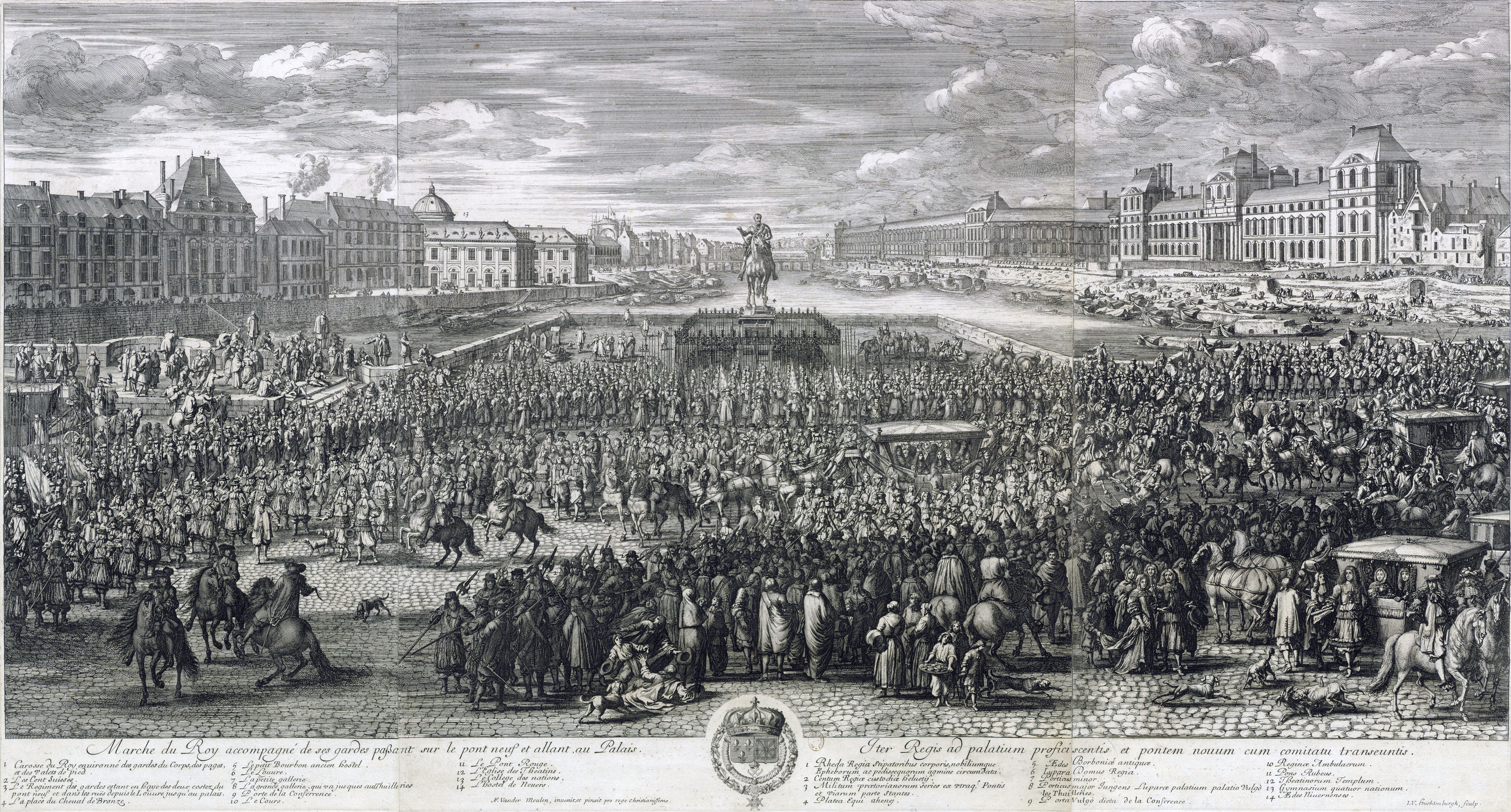
March of the King accompanied by his guards passing over the Pont Neuf in the direction of the Palace

Van der Meulen was granted a royal patent to have his original designs engraved and published. He put together a team of painters-printmakers to engrave his designs. Many of these printmakers came from Flanders and the Dutch Republic such as Adriaen Frans Boudewijns, Abraham Genoels, Jan van Huchtenburg and Romeyn de Hooghe. The French engraver Robert Bonnart trained with van der Meulen and sold prints on his behalf. Van der Meulen arranged for many of his drawings and paintings representing landscapes and scenes of the military life to be engraved. These were intended for a clientele of private clients. He and later his widow sold the prints from their lodgings at the Gobelin Manufacture. Later he hired publishers and merchants to distribute his prints. He arranged in 1670 for 13 large-scale plates representing sieges, the taking of towns and royal castles to be executed for the King's Cabinet. These were acquired by the Crown, which used them to make prints that were published by the Royal Printing Office for collectors in 1679. The painter succeeded in selling to the king in 1685 prints taken from new plates, and then arranged for the sale to the public of a second edition of prints which represented the series of The King's Conquests he had made for Marly.
