= Gaspar de Witte =

Flemish painter (1624–1681)

- Born: Gaspar de Witte; 5 October 1624; Antwerp
- Died: 20 March 1681 (aged 56); Antwerp
- Known for: Landscapes, gallery paintings
- Style: Baroque
- Movement: Bentvueghels
- Parents: Peter de Witte II (father); Barbara Remeeus (mother)
- Family: De Witte family

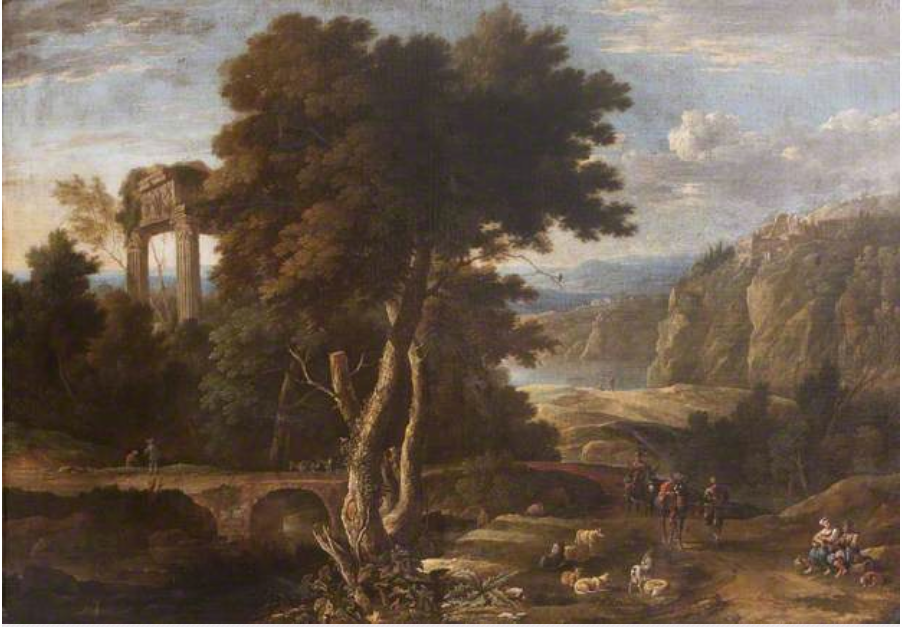
Classical Landscape with Travellers and a River

Gaspar de Witte (variations on his first name: Caspar, Jasper, and Jaspar) (bapt. 5 October 1624, Antwerp – 20 March 1681, Antwerp) was a Flemish painter who is known for his landscapes and gallery paintings.

== Life ==
Gaspar de Witte was born in Antwerp as the son of Peter de Witte II en Barbara Remeeus. He was member of a prominent painting family. His father and his brothers Peter de Witte III and Jan Baptist de Witte were all painters. Gaspar was also the godchild of Gerard Seghers, an eminent history painter of Antwerp. Gaspar de Witte trained with his father, who was specialized in landscapes, church interiors and religious paintings.

Gaspar de Witte travelled to Rome in 1646 and joined the Bentvueghels, an association of mainly Dutch and Flemish artists working in Rome. It was the custom in the Bentvueghels to initiate new members and give them a nickname (the so-called bentname). Gaspar de Witte was given the nickname Grondel ("Gudgeon"). The reason why he was named after this species of fish is not known. Around 1648 he is reported to have spent time in France.

When he returned to Antwerp he became "winemaster" (used to denote the son of a master) in the Antwerp Guild of Saint Luke in 1650. Gaspar de Witte also operated a small trading business in painting necessities. His engraved portrait by the engraver Richard Collin after a painting by Anton Goubau was published in Cornelis de Bie's 17th century book on Flemish painters called Het Gulden Cabinet.

He was the teacher of Cornelis Huysmans and possible also of Adriaen Verdoel.

== Work ==
=== General ===
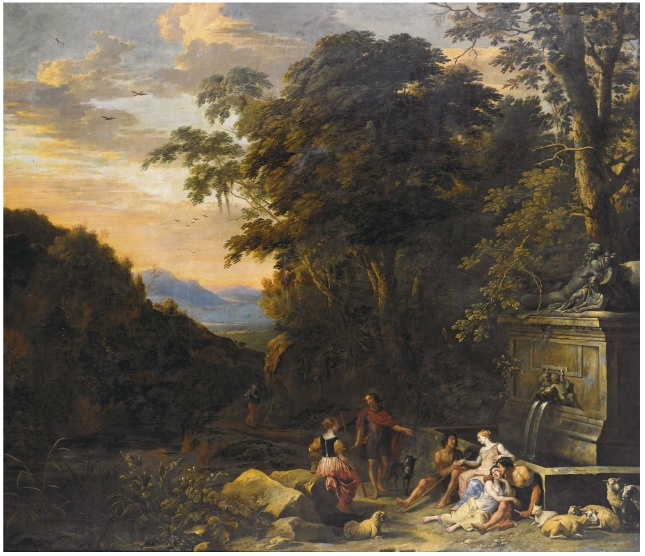
Italianate Landscape with Shepherds at a Fountain

Gaspar de Witte is remembered for his landscapes and his collaborations with other artists on gallery paintings.

=== Landscapes ===
His landscapes are similar to those of his contemporary landscape painters of Brussels. Most of them are not in the Italianate style then popular in Flanders but he often still included some Italian antique relics to respond to the prevalent taste in the local market. His landscapes often included pastoral scenes with shepherds, religious scenes or genre scenes such as village fairs or dances. His landscapes often involved collaborations with other painters who painted the staffage. Four collaborations with Anton Goubau on Italianizing landscapes are recorded.

In addition to imaginary landscapes he also produced a number of topographical views of country estates. These were often executed in collaboration with other painters who painted the staffage. An example is the View of Schoten Castle, which was a collaborative effort with Gonzales Coques. This composition shows a bird-eye view of Schoten Castle in Schoten painted by de Witte with two women and a boy painted by Coques in the front right corner. Another example of a collaboration with Coques is the Portrait of Clara Rubens with Her Family, which shows Clara Rubens, the daughter of Peter Paul Rubens, with her family against a background landscape showing Merksem Castle.

=== Gallery paintings ===
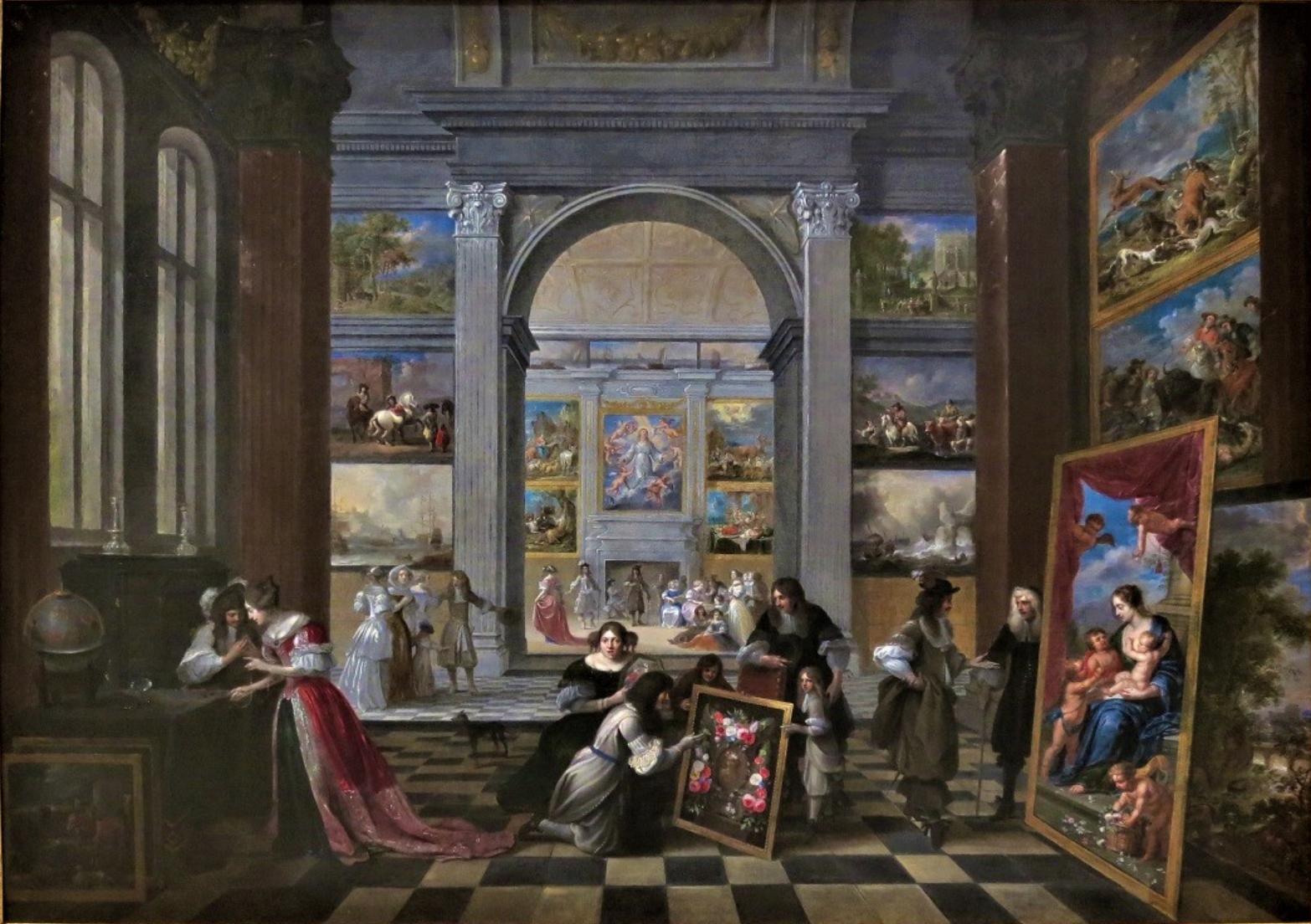
Interior of an art collector's cabinet with many visitors

Gaspar de Witte was a collaborator in a few compositions belonging to the genre of the 'gallery paintings'. The 'gallery paintings' genre is native to Antwerp where Frans Francken the Younger and Jan Brueghel the Elder were the first artists to create paintings of art and curiosity collections in the 1620s. Gallery paintings depict large rooms in which many paintings and other precious items are displayed in elegant surroundings. The earliest works in this genre represented art objects together with other items such as scientific instruments or peculiar natural specimens. The genre became immediately quite popular and was followed by other artists such as Jan Brueghel the Younger, Cornelis de Baellieur, Hans Jordaens, David Teniers the Younger, Gillis van Tilborch, Wilhelm Schubert van Ehrenberg and Hieronymus Janssens. The picture galleries depicted were sometimes real galleries. However, the majority were imaginary galleries, which sometimes included allegorical figures.

An example of a gallery painting by Caspar de Witte is the Interior of an art collector's cabinet with many visitors, which is a collaboration with Hieronymus Janssens and Wilhelm Schubert van Ehrenberg. The composition depicts an imaginary art gallery with many visitors who are appreciating and discussing some of the artworks in the gallery. This gallery painting represents a later development in the genre initiated by David Teniers the Younger that excluded non-art objects from the gallery. The figures in the gallery painting are portrayed as if they form part of an elite who possess a privileged knowledge, i.e. the ability to appreciate art. The genre of gallery paintings had by that time become a medium to accentuate the notion that the powers of discernment associated with connoisseurship are socially superior to or more desirable than other forms of knowing.

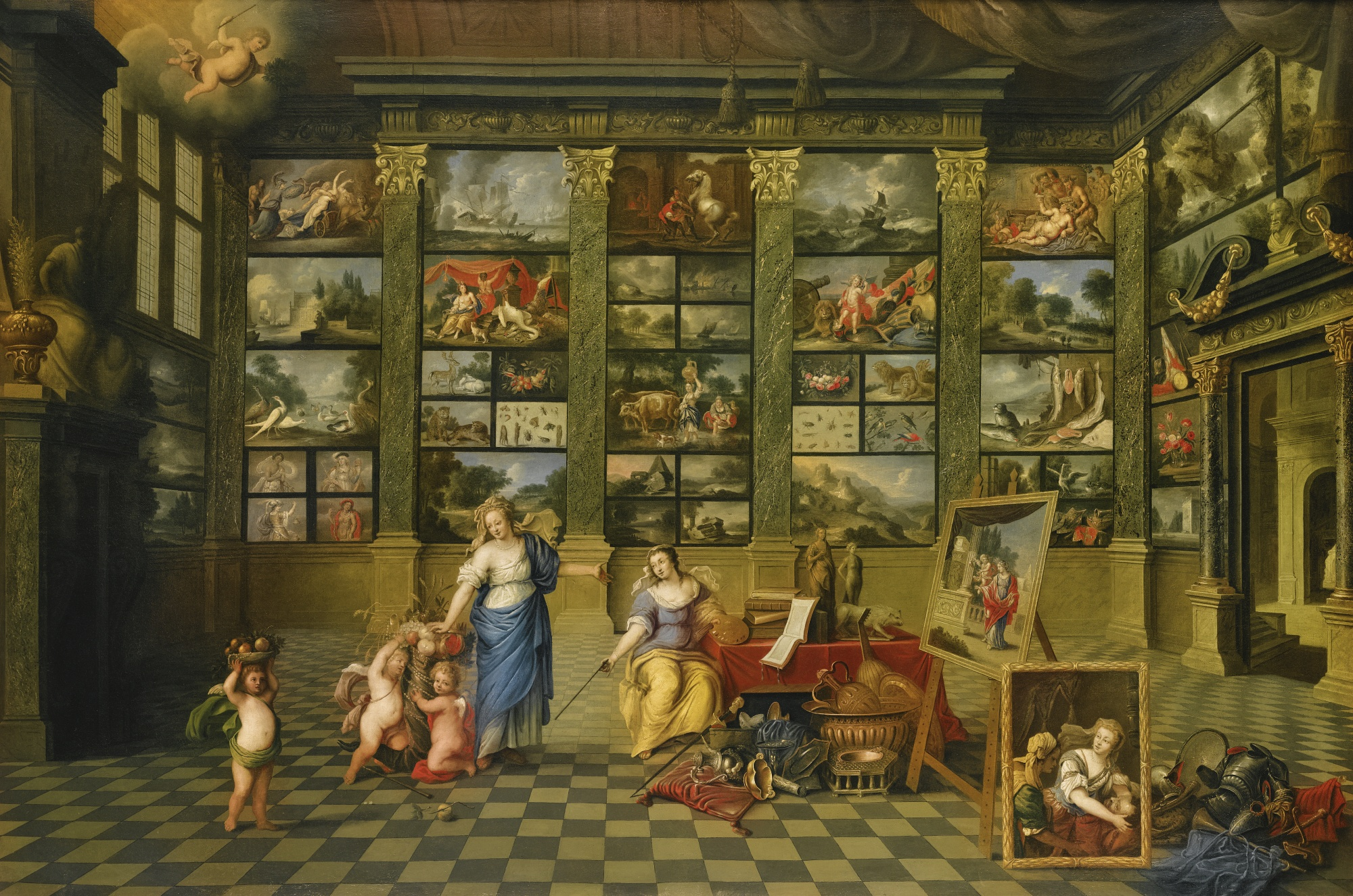
The allegorical female figures Nature and Pictura in an art-collection, with representative Antwerp canvasses

Gaspar de Witte has been identified recently as the painter likely responsible for an allegorical gallery painting referred to as The allegorical female figures Nature and Pictura in an art-collection, with representative Antwerp canvasses. Rather than representing an actual depiction of a picture gallery with collectors, art dealers or famous painters this composition falls into the allegorical type of gallery painting as it places two allegorical figures in the gallery. The figure of Plenty on the left has beside her three putti bearing a cornucopia, symbolizing her largesse. Seated beside her is a personification of Pictura or Painting who is identified by the palette in her hands. The statues and books on the table and the musical instrument below refer to a wider embodiment of the Arts in general. The allegory was intended to be one of Peace or the effects of Peace since in the lower right hand corner of the gallery are the accoutrements of war, discarded in a pile. The picture can also be regarded as an allegorical representation of the vanitas of worldly pursuits such as war which are transient in comparison to the arts and love, which endure for forever.

Gaspar de Witte was one of the collaborators in the gallery painting by Jacob de Formentrou referred to as Cabinet of pictures, currently in the Royal Collection. It depicts a room full of pictures populated with human figures who are usually interpreted as representing art connoisseurs. The various pictures that are hung on the walls of the room represent works of leading mid-17th-century artists of Antwerp. A cabinet of pictures depicts an imaginary gallery and can be seen as a summing up of the best of what artists in mid 17th-century Antwerp could produce. It is believed that the pictures included in the composition were painted by each of the relevant artists. Gaspar de Witte is believed to have painted the landscape right of the door, signed G.D.WITTE. The fact that de Witte was selected to participate in this collaborative effort demonstrates the esteem in which he was held by his fellow artists in Antwerp in his time.
