= Anton Goubau =

Flemish painter (1616–1698)

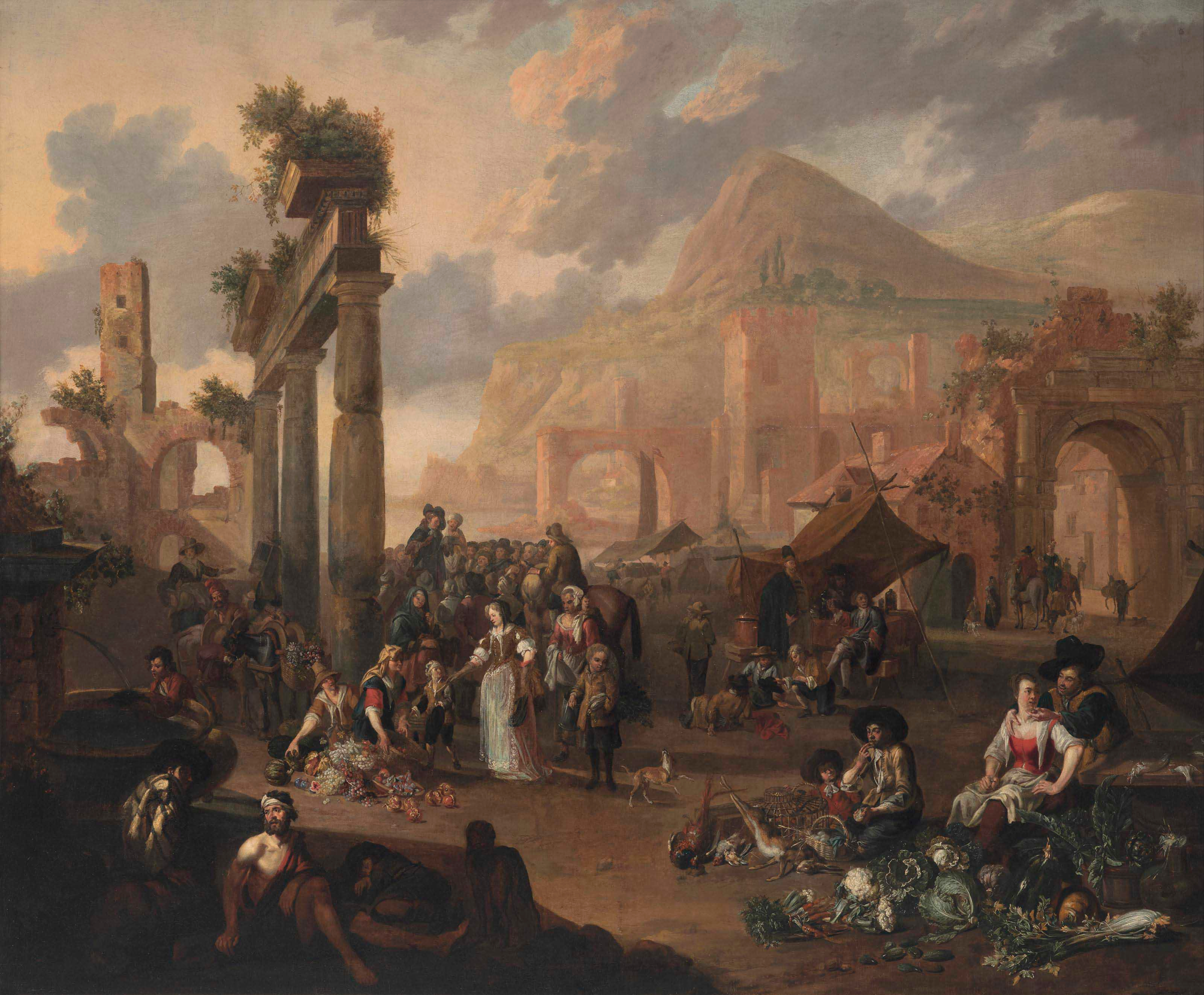
Italianate landscape with people gathered around a stage and peasants at a market

Anton Goubau or Anton Goebouw (May 1616 – 11 March 1698) was a Flemish Baroque painter. He spent time in Rome where he moved in the circle of the Bamboccianti, a name given to mainly Dutch and Flemish genre painters who created small cabinet paintings of the everyday life of the lower classes in Rome and its countryside. He is known for his Italianate landscapes and genre paintings in the style of the Bamboccianti and his history paintings with mythological and religious themes.

== Life ==
Goubau was born in Antwerp as the son of Antonius Goubau and Livina Cornet and baptized in the local Saint Georges Church on 27 May 1616. His family was well-off. He commenced his study of painting under the obscure painter Johannes de Vargas (Jan de Farius) in 1629. He became a master of the Antwerp Guild of Saint Luke in 1636 or 1637. He is recorded in Paris in 1642 and then traveled on to Italy. He stayed in Rome from 1644 to 1650. Here he became close to the group of genre painters around the Dutch painter Pieter van Laar commonly referred to as the 'Bamboccianti'.

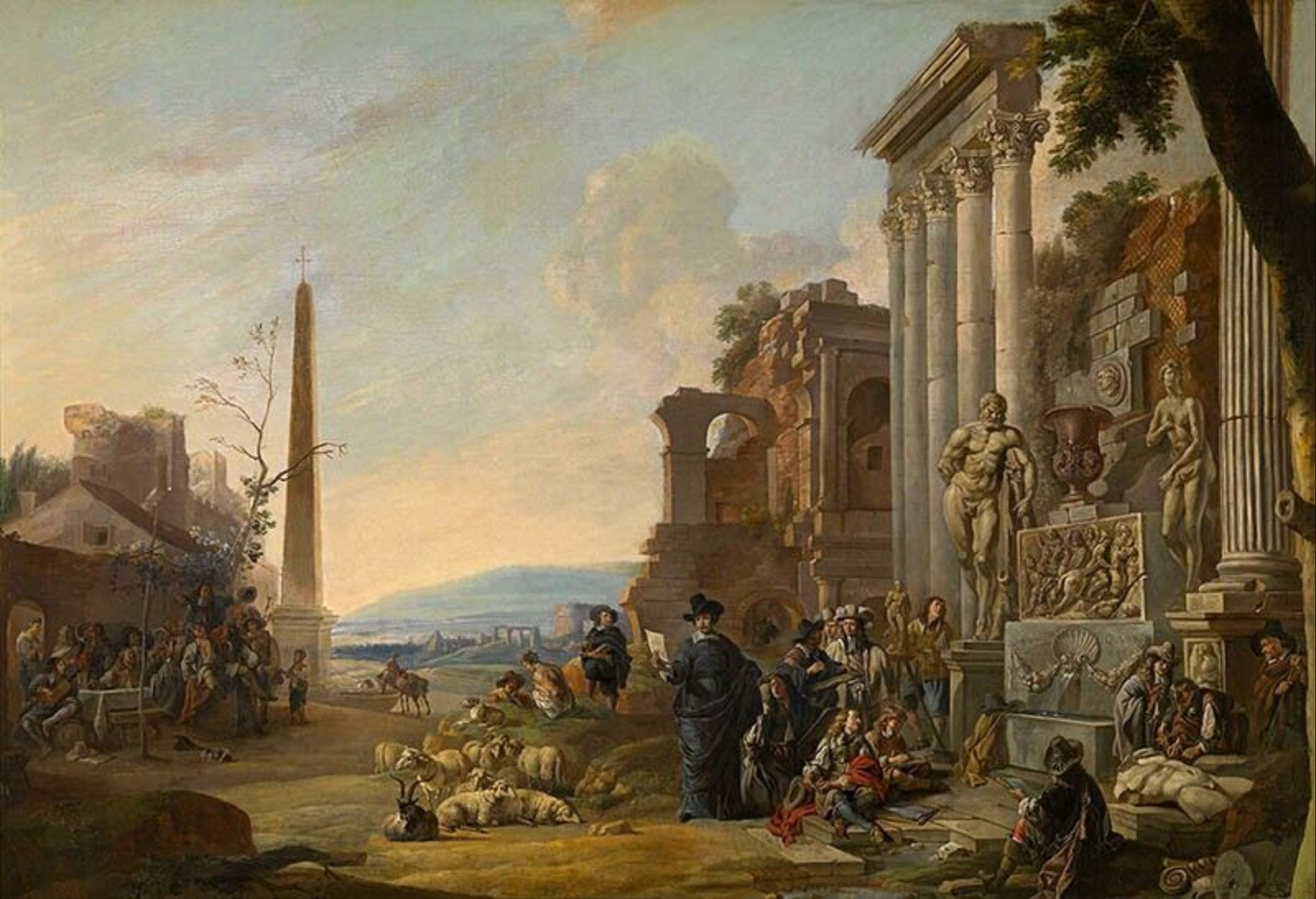
The study of art in Rome

There is no evidence that he joined the Bentvueghels, the association of mainly Dutch and Flemish artists working in Rome, even though he painted a work entitled The study of art in Rome (1662, now in the Royal Museum of Fine Arts Antwerp), which depicts several members of the Bentvueghels making drawings of ancient ruins in a landscape outside Rome. This proves that he was at least close to artists who had joined the Bentvueghels.

In 1650 Goubau returned to Antwerp. Here he joined on 31 October 1650 the 'Sodality of the Unmarried Men of Age' (Sodaliteit der bejaerde jongmans), a fraternity for bachelors established by the Jesuit order. On 26 October 1653 he was appointed by the Jesuits as a Consultor of the Sodality. In 1655 he was appointed by the Dominican order as Prefect of the 'Confraternity of the Sweet Name of Jesus' (Broederschap van den Zoeten Naam Jesus). He received many commissions for religious works. He also continued to paint Italianate landscapes with many figures and ancient ruins serving an international clientele including German aristocrats.

Goubau's pupils included Abraham Couchet, Arnold Gerardi, Justus Gerardi, Laureys Goubau, Nicolas de Largillière, Jan Baptist Tijssens the Elder and Jan Baptist Tijssens the Younger.

In his final years he was seriously ill and unable to work. He died on 11 March 1698 at his home in the Lange Meirstraat in Antwerp and was buried on 21 April 1698.

== Works ==
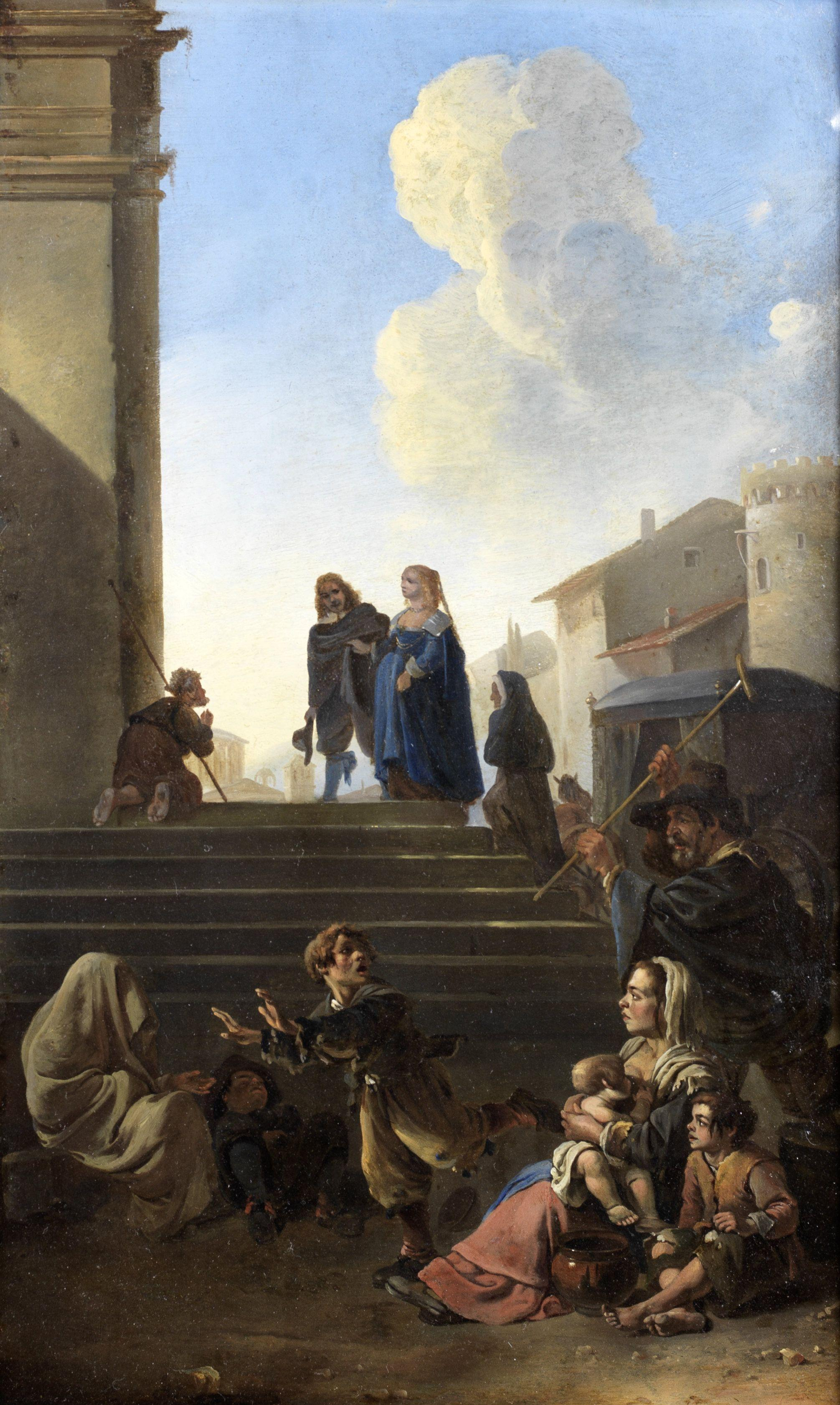
Peasants before church steps

Goubau is best known as a painter of market scenes placed in a Roman or Mediterranean setting, often decorated with many small figures in the style of the Bamboccianti. The name Bamboccianti is given to a loose group of principally Dutch and Flemish genre painters who were active in Rome from about 1625 until the end of the seventeenth century. The feature that connects them is their interest in painting the everyday life of the lower classes in Rome and its countryside. During his trip to Italy, Goubau was able to familiarize himself with the work of masters like Paul Bril (known for his Italianate landscapes) and the Bamboccianti painters Jan Miel, Jan Both, Michael Sweerts and Johannes Lingelbach. This was crucial to the development of his style and subject matter along the Italianate genre style.

On his return to Antwerp he painted Italianate landscapes with many small figures which show the influence of Bartholomew Breenbergh, Jan Both and the early Roman compositions of Jan Asselijn. He showed generally more interest in evoking a Roman atmosphere than correct topographical representation and combined several sites in Rome to create a kind of synthesis of the sights in Rome. In some paintings he shows a more specific topographical interest.

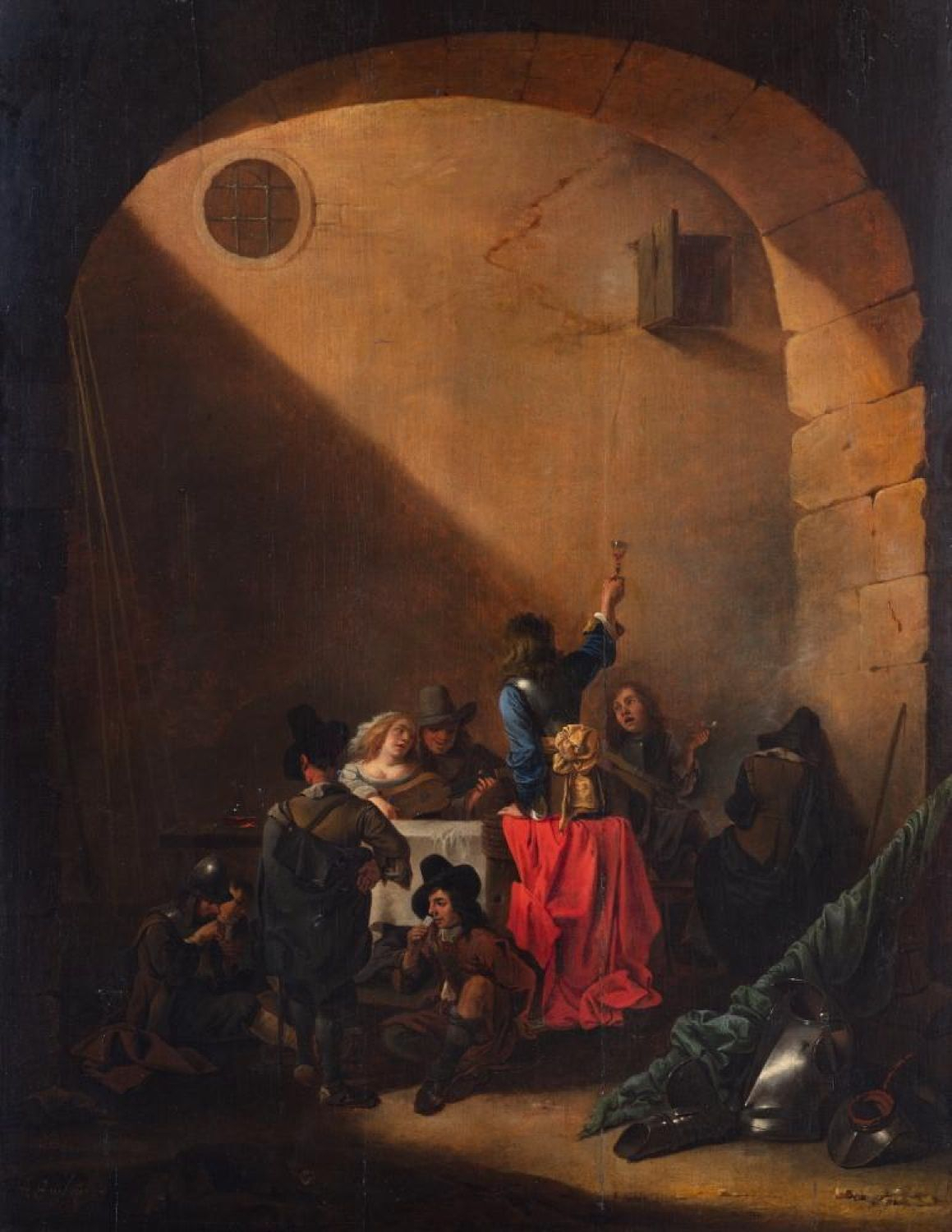
Guardroom scene

He occasionally painted so-called 'guardroom scenes', a type of genre scene depicting an interior with officers and soldiers who spend their off duty time making merry. The genre had become popular in the mid-17th century, particularly in the Dutch Republic. In Flanders there were also a few practitioners of the genre including David Teniers the Younger, Abraham Teniers, Gillis van Tilborch, Cornelis Mahu and Jan Baptist Tijssens the Younger. Guardroom scenes often included mercenaries and prostitutes dividing booty, harassing captives, or indulging in other forms of reprehensible activities. A good example of the genre is the Guardroom painting at the Kurpfälzisches Museum in Heidelberg, which depicts eight soldiers around a table in a monumental room. In line with the moralizing intent of the genre, the various figures depict the Flemish saying Kaart, kous en kan maakt menig arm man (Cards, women and drink have ruined many a man). The card players are crouching on the floor, while a provocatively dressed woman is playing a lute and a soldier with his back turned towards the viewer is raising his glass to a man who is smoking. A man slumped in the right corner represents 'acedia' (apathy), considered to be one of the seven cardinal sins. The painting also references the theme of vanitas through the still life of a standard and military equipment at the front on the right, which expresses the transience of power and fame.

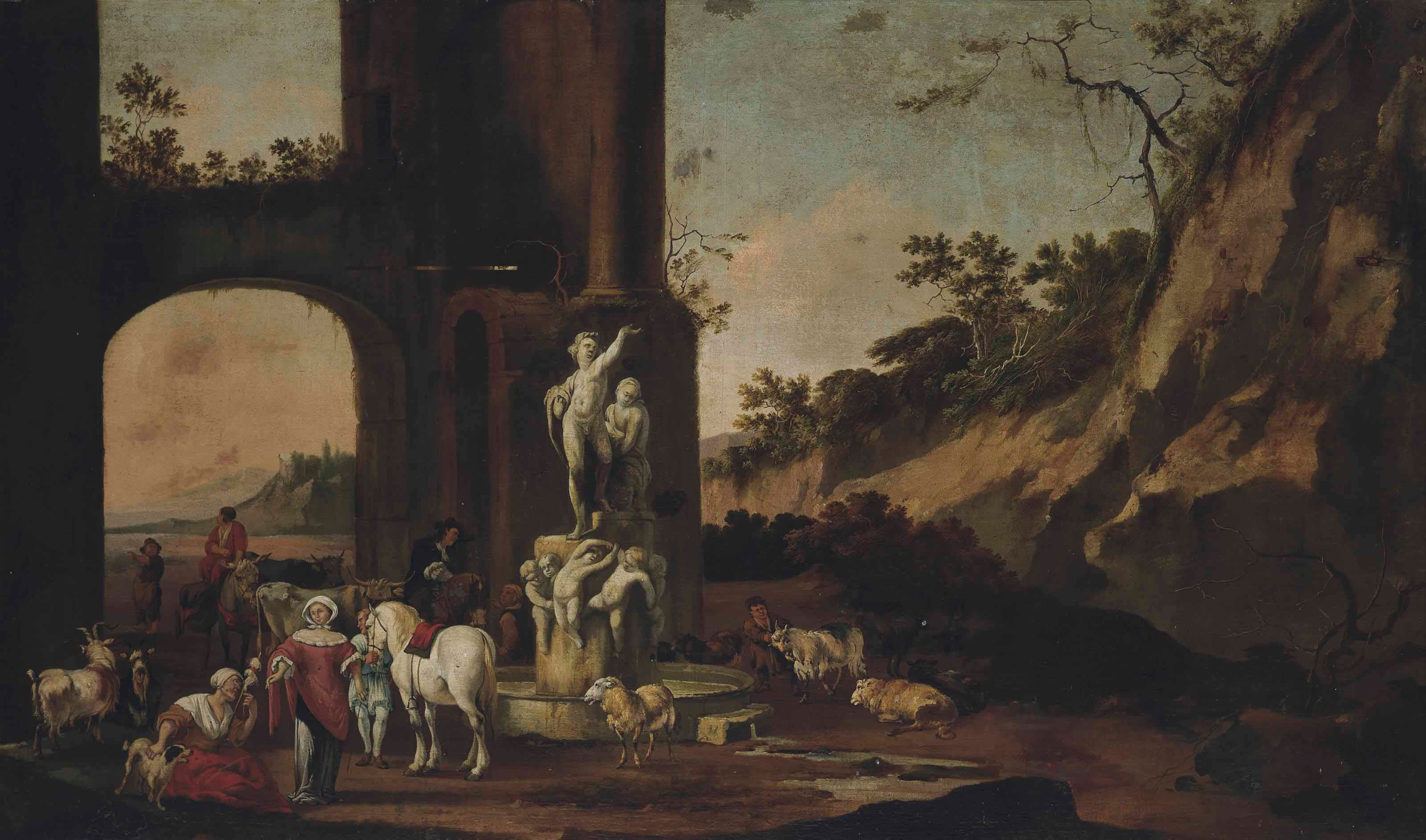
Rocky landscape with figures, horses, goats, bulls and sheep by a fountain

In addition to his cityscapes, Goubau painted many religious compositions, especially designed for churches in Antwerp. He also made a number of religious paintings on copper as part of a series made for the Spanish market to which other Flemish painters such as Willem van Herp, Erasmus Quellinus II, and possibly Abraham Willemsens contributed. The series is now kept in the Convent of las Comendadoras de Santiaga in Madrid.

He also painted portraits. A portrait of Gaspar de Witte by him was engraved by Richard Collin for Cornelis de Bie's collection of artist biographies entitled Het Gulden Cabinet.
