= Gillis van Tilborgh =

Flemish painter (1625–1678)

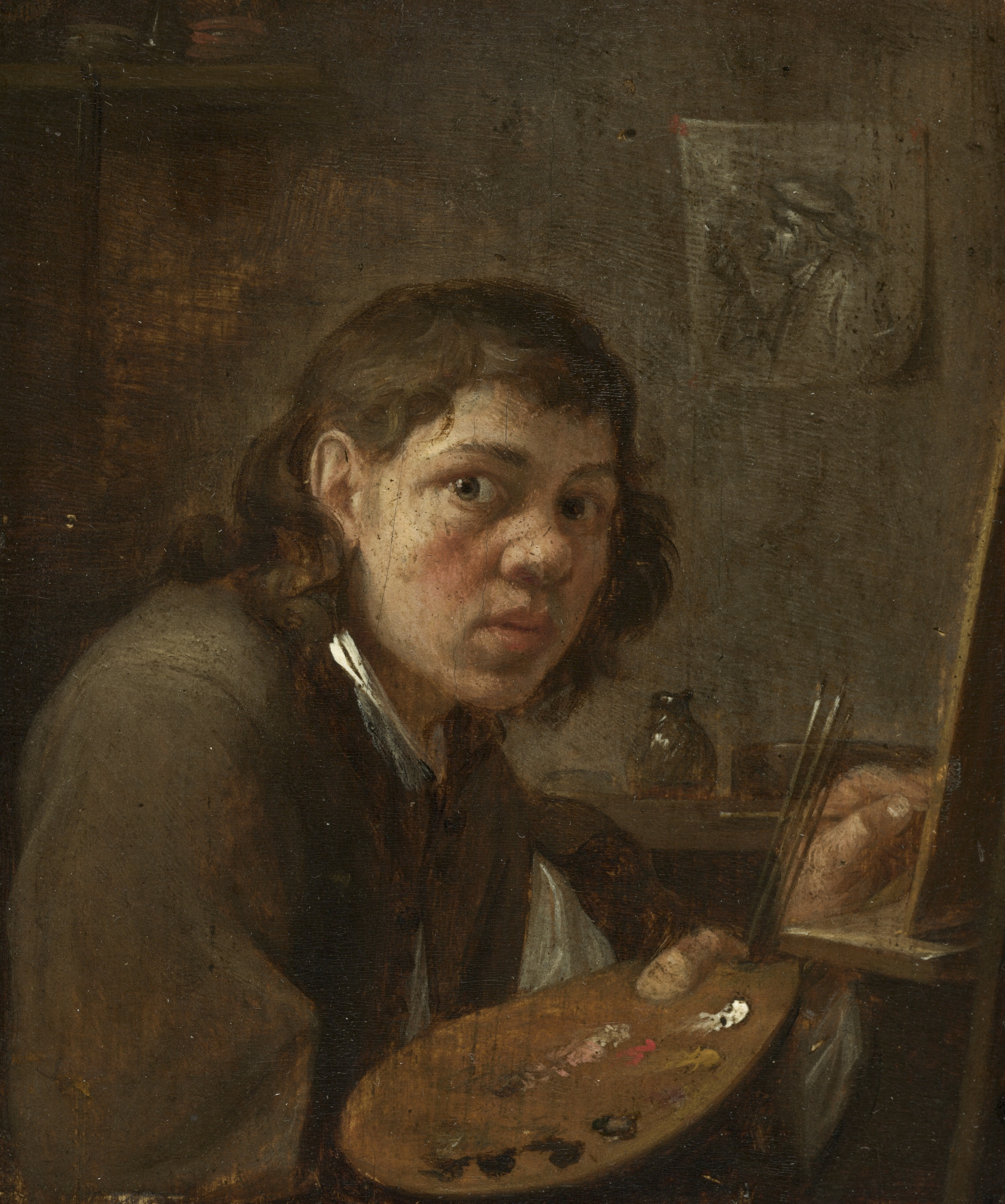
Self-portrait

Gillis van Tilborgh or Gillis van Tilborch (c. 1625 – c. 1678) was a Flemish painter who worked in various genres including portraits, 'low-life' and elegant genre paintings and paintings of picture galleries. He became the keeper of the picture collection of the governor of the Habsburg Netherlands and travelled in England where he painted group portraits.

== Life ==
Gillis van Tilborgh was likely born in Brussels. He is believed to have studied first under his father Gillis van Tilborgh the Elder and then with David Teniers the Younger. He became a master in the Brussels Guild of Saint Luke in 1654. He was the dean of the Guild in 1663.

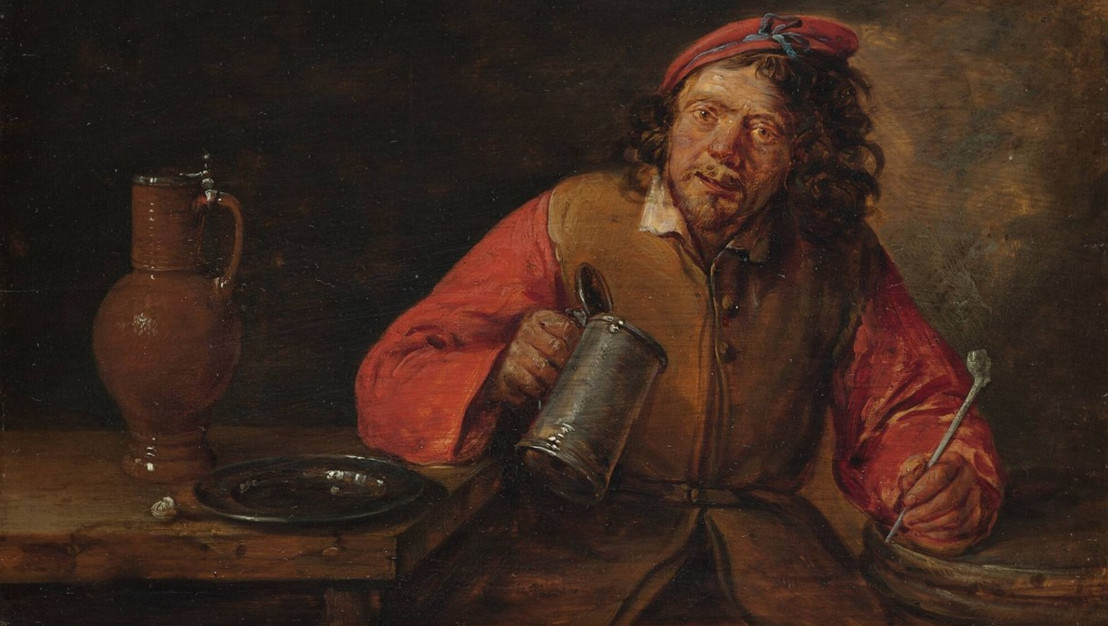
The drinker

He was appointed in 1666 as the keeper of the painting collection of the court and Tervuren castle, the residence of the governor of the Habsburg Netherlands. His presumed master David Teniers the Younger had previously held the same position for Archduke Leopold Wilhelm, the art loving governor of the Habsburg Netherlands.

Van Tilborgh is known to have operated a sizable workshop in Brussels but none of his pupils or assistants have been identified. At around 1670 he travelled to England as is documented by a painting depicting Tichborne House and the Tichborne family giving alms (the so-called Tichborne Dole).

The date and place of his death are not known but it was likely c. 1678 in Brussels.

== Work ==
=== General ===
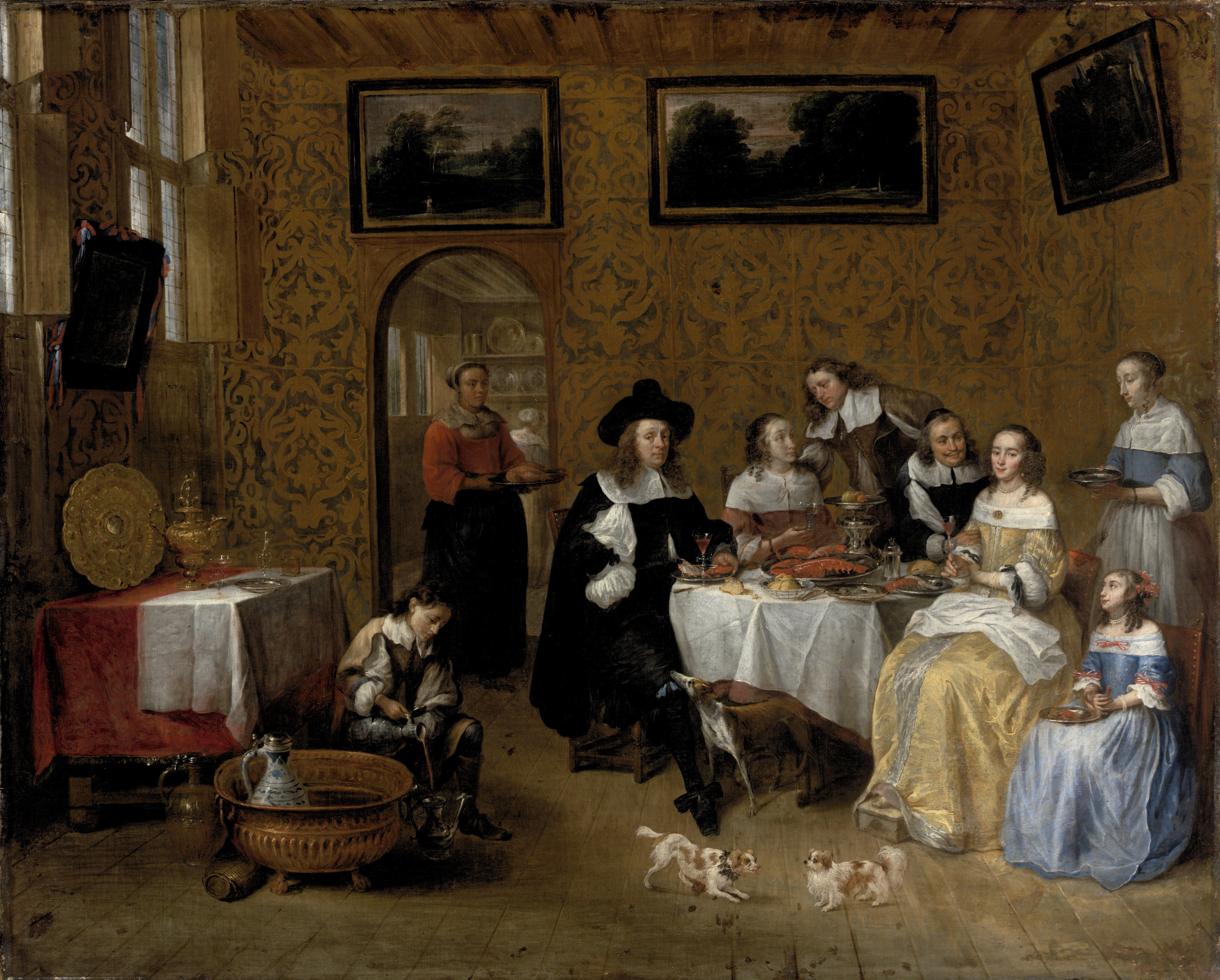
Family portrait

Gillis van Tilborgh's works are dated from 1650 to 1671. He usually signed with the monogram 'TB'. The range of his subject matter is as diverse as that of his presumed master David Teniers the Younger and encompasses portraits, group portraits, tavern scenes, village feasts, merry companies, picture galleries and guardroom scenes.

He was known for his harmonious palette, exact drawing and compositional skills.

=== Genre scenes ===
In his tavern scenes he shows himself to be a close follower of Adriaen Brouwer, just as David Ryckaert III and Joos van Craesbeeck were. This is clearly visible in The drinker (Museum Boijmans Van Beuningen).

His village scenes follow the style of David Teniers the Younger's mature period. During that period Teniers had moved away from the traditional depictions of peasants as uncultured boors towards a more idealised and elevated perception of peasants and village life. An example is the Village inn in the Hermitage.

=== Picture galleries ===
He also painted 'gallery paintings' or 'picture galleries', a subject matter that had developed in Flanders in the 17th century. Gallery paintings depict large rooms in which many paintings and other precious items are displayed in elegant surroundings. The earliest works in this genre depicted art objects together with other items such as scientific instruments or peculiar natural specimens. Some gallery paintings include portraits of the owners or collectors of the art objects or artists at work. The paintings are heavy with symbolism and allegory and are a reflection of the intellectual preoccupations of the age, including the cultivation of personal virtue and the importance of connoisseurship.

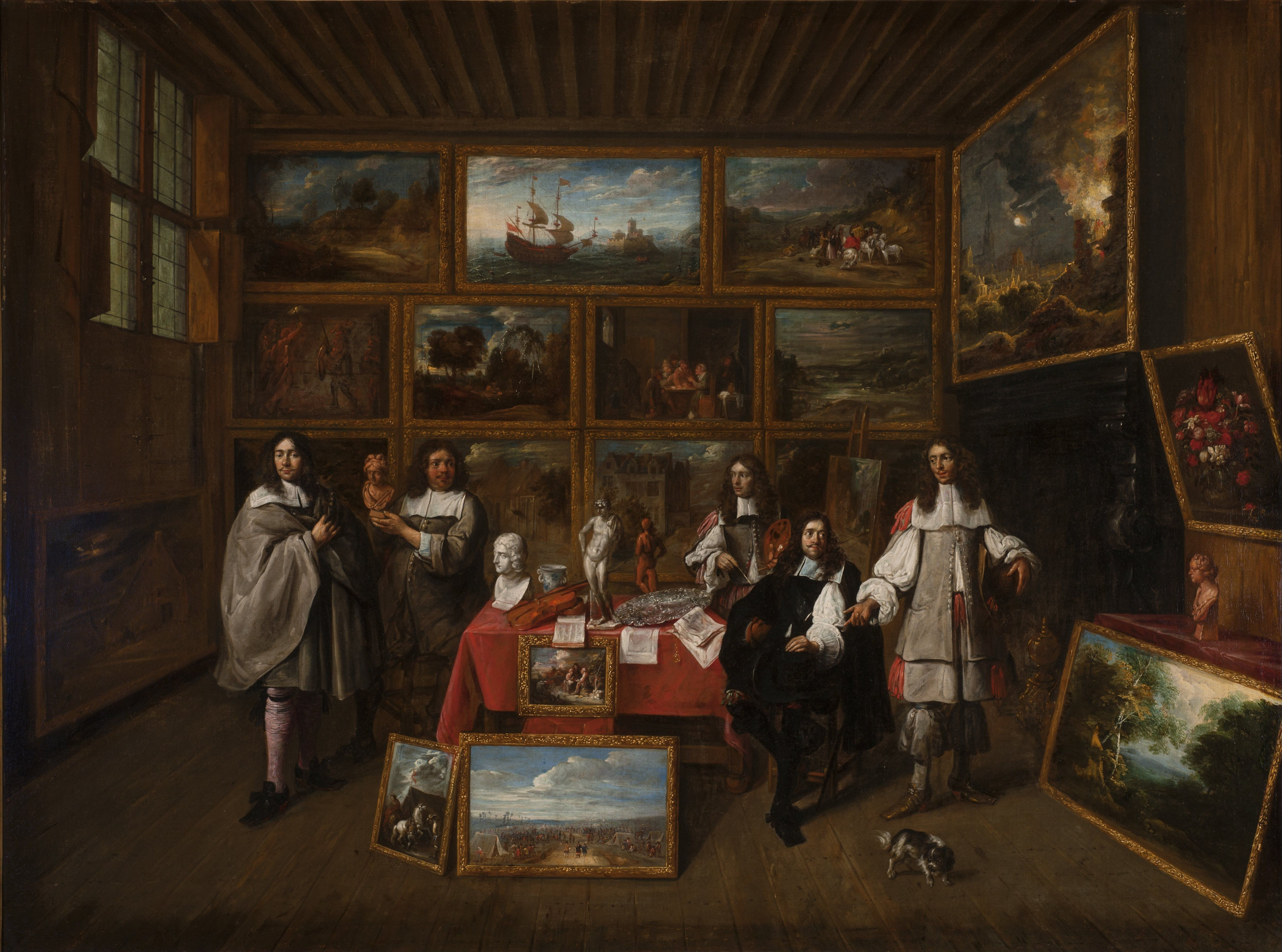
A picture gallery

Van Tilborgh’s master Teniers played an important role in the development of the genre and his mid 17th century gallery paintings of the collection of Archduke Leopold Wilhelm are among the most famous examples of the genre. Other painters practicing the genre around the time of van Tilborgh include Wilhelm Schubert van Ehrenberg, Hieronymus Janssens, Gonzales Coques, Jacob de Formentrou and Balthasar van den Bossche. An example of van Tilborgh’s gallery paintings is A Picture Gallery (c. 1660–70, Spencer Museum of Art, University of Kansas, Lawrence). It depicts a group of five elegantly dressed gentlemen in the act of appreciating several sculptures some of which they are holding. The walls of the room is covered with paintings in different genres. Some paintings, which the elegant figures already have or are about to evaluate, are resting on the floor or on a chair. At least one of the persons depicted is an artist as he is holding a brush and palette. Gillis van Tilborgh’s gallery paintings continue the trend initiated by Teniers to remove non-art objects from the gallery. He depicts his figures in the gallery paintings to emphasise that they form part of an elite who possess privileged knowledge of art.

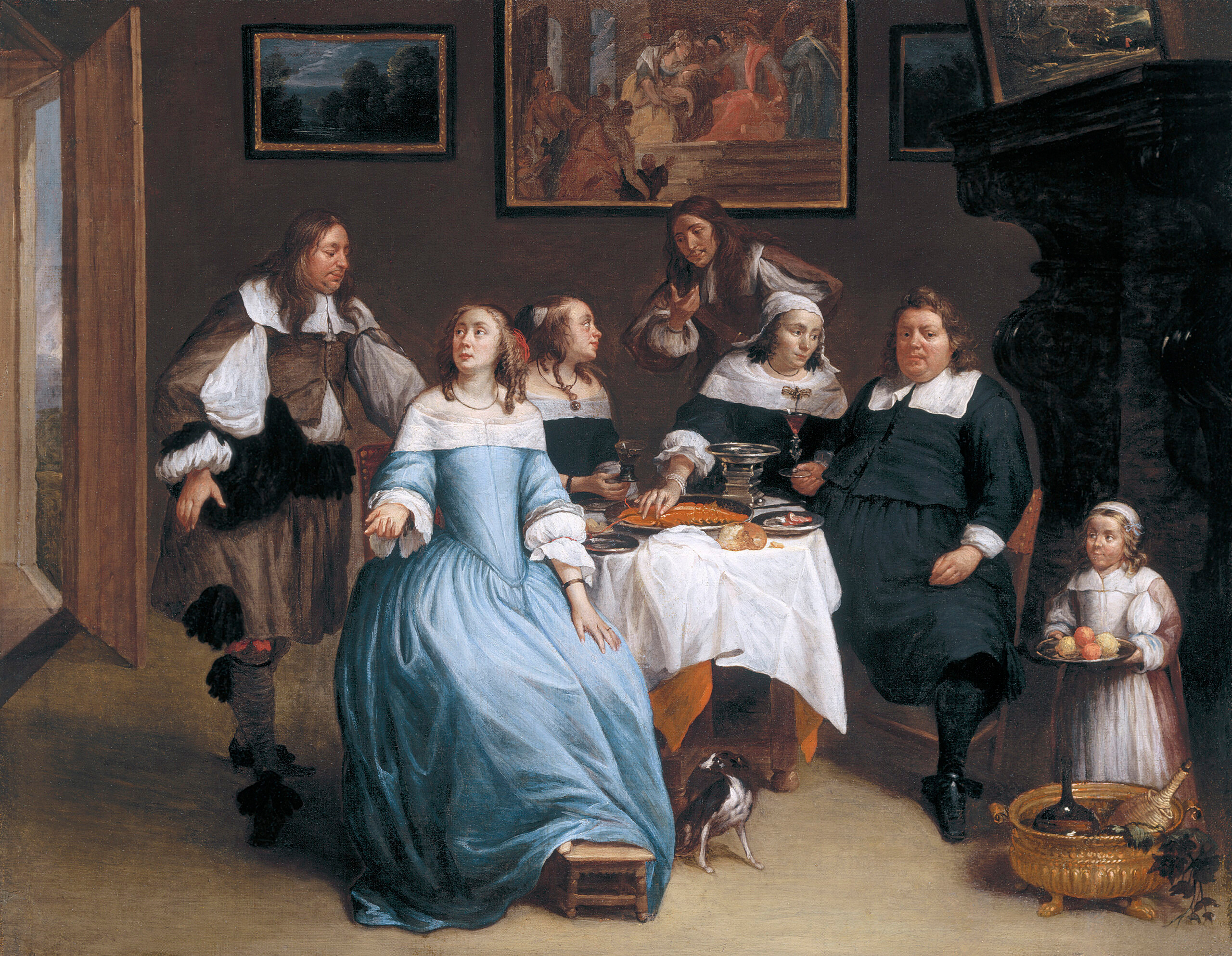
Elegant company

In some of his gallery paintings he included artists at work. The genre of gallery paintings had by then become a medium to accentuate the notion that the powers of discernment associated with connoisseurship are socially superior to or more desirable than other forms of knowing. His series documenting paintings held at Tervuren castle are other examples of his contributions to the genre.

=== Portraits ===
His portraits of bourgeois sitters are similar to those of Gonzales Coques, who was referred to in his time as the 'little van Dyck'. Like many of his contemporaries such as Teniers and Coques, he painted allegories, an example of which is the series depicting the Five Senses (Royal Museums of Fine Arts of Belgium).

=== Guardroom scenes ===
He painted at least two 'guardroom scenes', a type of genre scene that had become popular in the mid-17th century, particularly in the Dutch Republic. In Flanders there were also a few practitioners of the genre including David Teniers the Younger, Abraham Teniers, Anton Goubau, Cornelis Mahu and Jan Baptist Tijssens the Younger. A guard room scene typically depicts an interior scene with officers and soldiers engaged in merrymaking. Guardroom scenes often included mercenaries and prostitutes dividing booty, harassing captives or indulging in other forms of reprehensible activities.

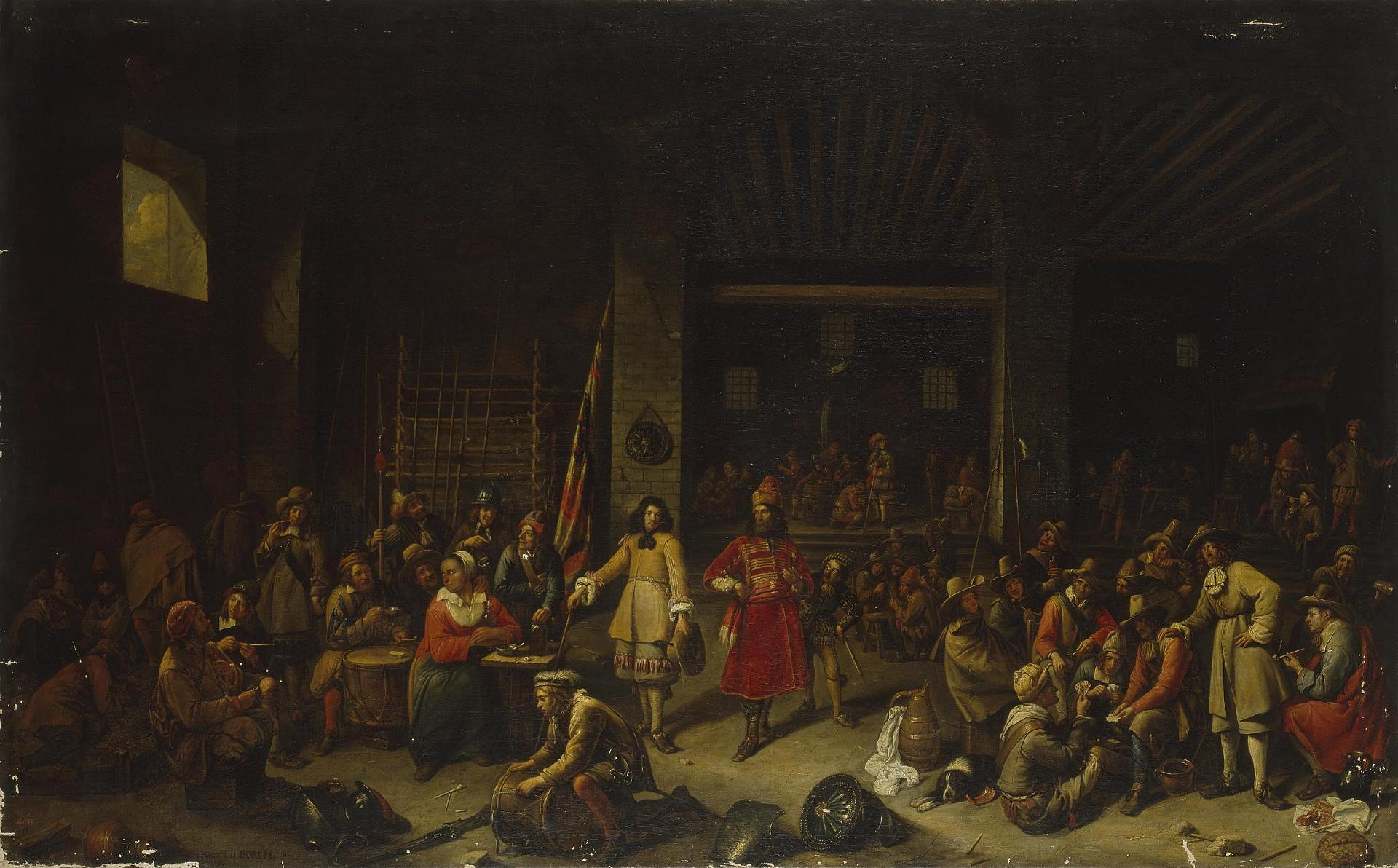
Guardroom, Hermitage

Van Tilborgh painted a Guardroom scene (sold by Jean Moust Old Master Paintings), which depicts an officer reading a letter for four men, amidst a pile of weapons and a war standard. The armour depicted in the picture was already out of date at the time it was painted since metal armours, breast plates and helmets fell out of use from the 1620s. It is possible that in line with the moralizing intent of the genre, the armour is a reference to the vanitas motif of the transience of power and fame.

The Hermitage collection includes a Guardroom scene which is ascribed to van Tilborgh. This scene is set in a very large guardroom with numerous people engaging in various activities. In the middle of the guardroom stand two gentlemen in what appears to be oriental dress.

=== Collaborations ===
As was the custom at the time, van Tilborgh often collaborated with other artists. He would typically take care of the staffage while the collaborating artist painted the landscape. An example is the Family Portrait said to be of the Van der Witte Family painted together with landscape painter Jan Siberechts (Sotheby's, 5 July 2012, London, lot 134). In this composition, the artists placed their subjects on an unlikely steep rise overlooking their large estate.

Another collaboration was with the landscape painter Guilliam van Schoor with whom he made a View of Tervuren castle (Royal Museums of Fine Arts of Belgium). It includes a few workers and about a dozen aristocratic observers engaging in contemplative and leisurely activities. In the foreground are two people playing music. An exotic bird perched on the neck of the guitar provides through its intense colours a visual substitute for the music that cannot be heard.
