= Jacob de Formentrou =

Flemish Baroque painter (c.1620/25–c.1668)

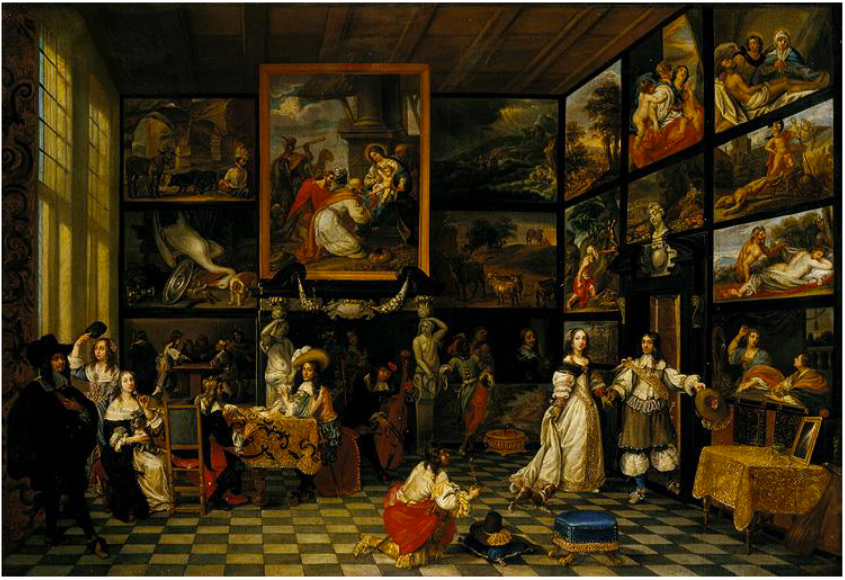
Interior of a picture gallery

Jacob de Formentrou or Jacob de Fourmentrou (b. between 1620 and 1625 – d. after 1668) was a Flemish Baroque painter active in Antwerp who specialized in the genres of merry companies and gallery paintings.

== Life ==
Very little is known about the life of Jacob de Formentrou. In the years 1640-1641 he is mentioned as a pupil in the records of the Antwerp Guild of Saint Luke. He subsequently became a master of the Guild and was still registered as such in 1659.

The painting A gentleman courting a lady music making in a courtyard dated 1668 (sold at Christie's on 10 December 2010, London, lot 2122) constitutes the last recorded information on de Formentrou.

== Work ==
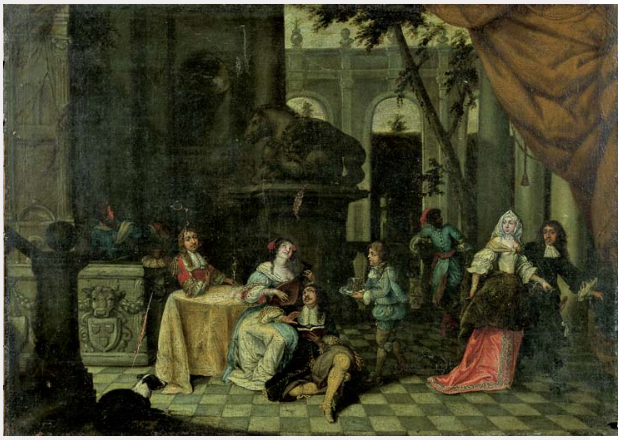
Elegant company on a terrace

Only a few works by his hand are known today. These can all be classified as genre paintings, in particular paintings of merry companies and gallery pictures.

=== Merry companies ===
The few paintings attributed to de Formentrou include the paintings Interior of an art gallery and Elegant company on a terrace, both in private collections as well as Playing Backgammon (present location unknown). The first two belong to the genre of the merry company depicting a group of people enjoying themselves. The genre was popular in Flanders as well as in the Dutch Republic in the 17th century.

=== Gallery paintings ===
Two compositions belonging to the genre of the 'gallery paintings' are attributed to him: the Interior of an art gallery (private collection) and the Cabinet of pictures, currently in the Royal Collection. The 'gallery paintings' genre is native to Antwerp where Frans Francken the Younger and Jan Brueghel the Elder were the first artists to create paintings of art and curiosity collections in the 1620s. Gallery paintings depict large rooms in which many paintings and other precious items are displayed in elegant surroundings. The earliest works in this genre depicted art objects together with other items such as scientific instruments or peculiar natural specimens. The genre became immediately quite popular and was followed by other artists such as Jan Brueghel the Younger, Cornelis de Baellieur, Hans Jordaens, David Teniers the Younger, Gillis van Tilborch and Hieronymus Janssens.

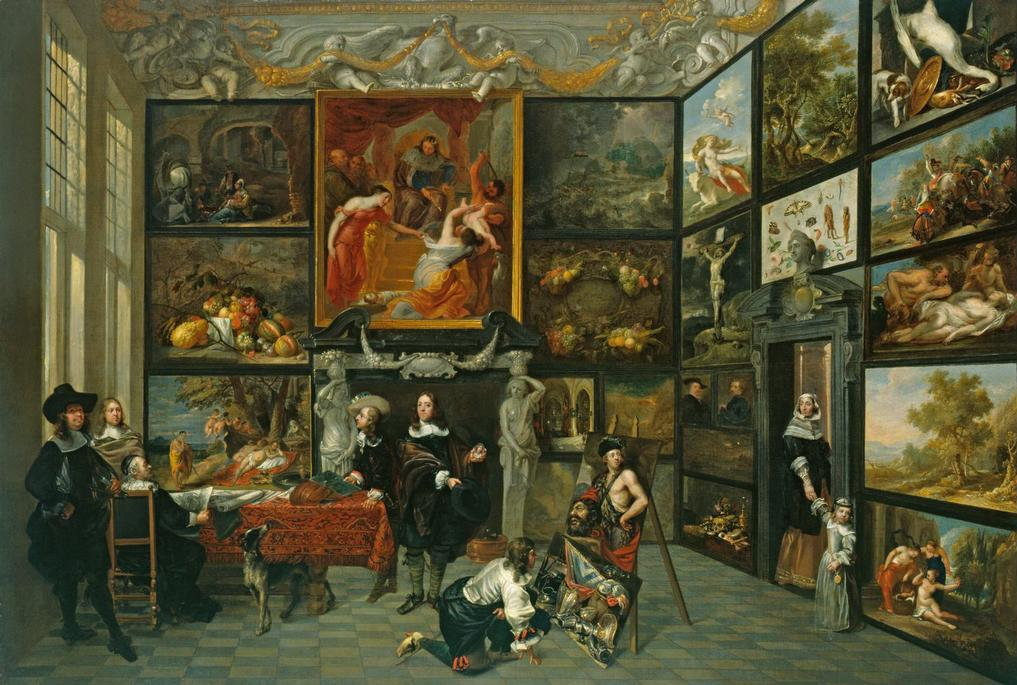
Cabinet of Pictures

De Formentrou's best known painting is the gallery painting referred to as Cabinet of pictures (also known as Art lovers in a painting cabinet), currently in the Royal Collection. It depicts a room full of pictures populated with human figures who are usually interpreted as representing art connoisseurs. The various pictures that are hung on the walls of the room represent works of leading artists of de Formentrou's generation working in Antwerp in the middle and second half of the 17th century. The composition also includes portraits of Rubens and van Dyck, the two eminent Antwerp artists of the previous generation.

Gallery paintings can represent actual collections or imaginary collections. A cabinet of pictures depicts an imaginary gallery and can be seen as a summing up of the best of what artists in mid 17th-century Antwerp could produce.

A number of issues relating to the composition are still not resolved entirely. First of all the date of the painting. As an early essay incorrectly dated the painting to 1683, it was assumed for many years to be the composition given that year as a present to the attorney Jan van Baveghem by members of Antwerp's Guild of St. Luke. However, after the discovery in the painting of dates in the 1650s the 1683 date was rejected. The date of the painting is now put at 1654 by F.G. Meijer (as one of the presumed collaborators of the painting died the next year) while Hannelore Magnus dates it to 1659. Art historians are also not unanimous in their view of whether the painting was a collaboration between a few painters or a large group of painters. On the basis of an iconographic analysis Hannelore Magnus comes to the conclusion that the painting is not a collaboration between all the artists whose works are represented in the painting but rather represents the combined effort of de Formentrou and Erasmus Quellinus II, a leading Antwerp painter. F. G. Meijer on the other hand believes that the composition is a collaboration between all of the artists whose work are depicted. He attributes the composition and the various pictures depicted in it as follows:

- Jacob de Formentrou: the interior and figures;
- Jan Davidsz. de Heem: the fruit still life in the middle left, signed I D Heem;
- Erasmus Quellinus the Younger: the painting above the chimney and the sculptures in the interior;
- Joris van Son: the cartouche still life on the right of the back wall, signed J.VAN'SON
- Pieter Neefs the Elder or Pieter Neefs the Younger: the church interior at the right of the fireplace, dated and monogrammed:1654/PN;
- Jan Peeters I: the landscape to the right of the cartouche still life, monogrammed i.P;
- Hendrick Andriessen: the vanitas still life at the bottom left on the right-hand wall, monogrammed HA;
- possibly Peter de Witte (II): the landscape in the middle high on the right-hand wall, monogrammed PDW;
- Jan van Kessel the Elder: the insect study on white background on the right above the door, monogrammed IVK;
- Pieter Boel: the still life of a dead swan high up on the right of the right-hand wall, signed P.BOEL;
- Nicolaas van Eyck: the equestrian battle, which is the second-highest on the right of the right-hand wall, signed N.V.EYCK;
- Gaspar de Witte: the landscape right of the door, signed G.D.WITTE; and
- Anonymous, dated 165(3?): various paintings and copies.

The painting can be read as a reference to connoisseurship, and in particular the connoisseur's activity of evaluating the authorship of paintings based on stylistic characteristics. It can also be regarded as a carefully crafted advertisement of the current talent and past legacy of the Antwerp school of painting.
