= Victor Mahu =

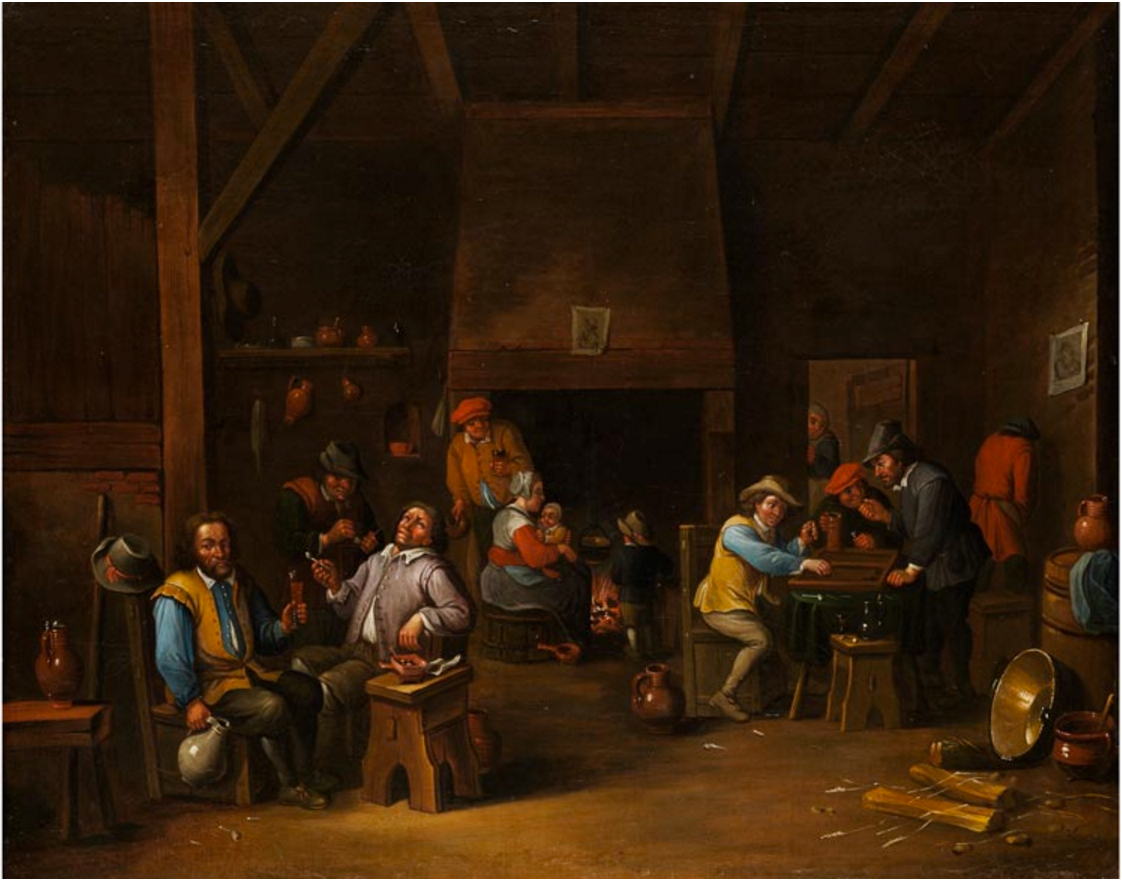
Tavern scene

Victor Mahu (born Antwerp, 23-10-1647 (church of Saint Jacob), fl 1689 - 1700) was a Flemish painter active in Antwerp who specialized in genre painting. He is mainly known for his genre scenes of drinkers, card and board game players, dancers, musicians, peasants, cooks, and maids placed in tavern or kitchen interiors.

== Life ==
Little is known about the life of Victor Mahu. His father was the Antwerp-based painter Cornelis Mahu (1613–1689), who was a versatile artist who practiced in many genres including still life, genre paintings, and seascapes and showed a very high level of craftsmanship in his compositions.

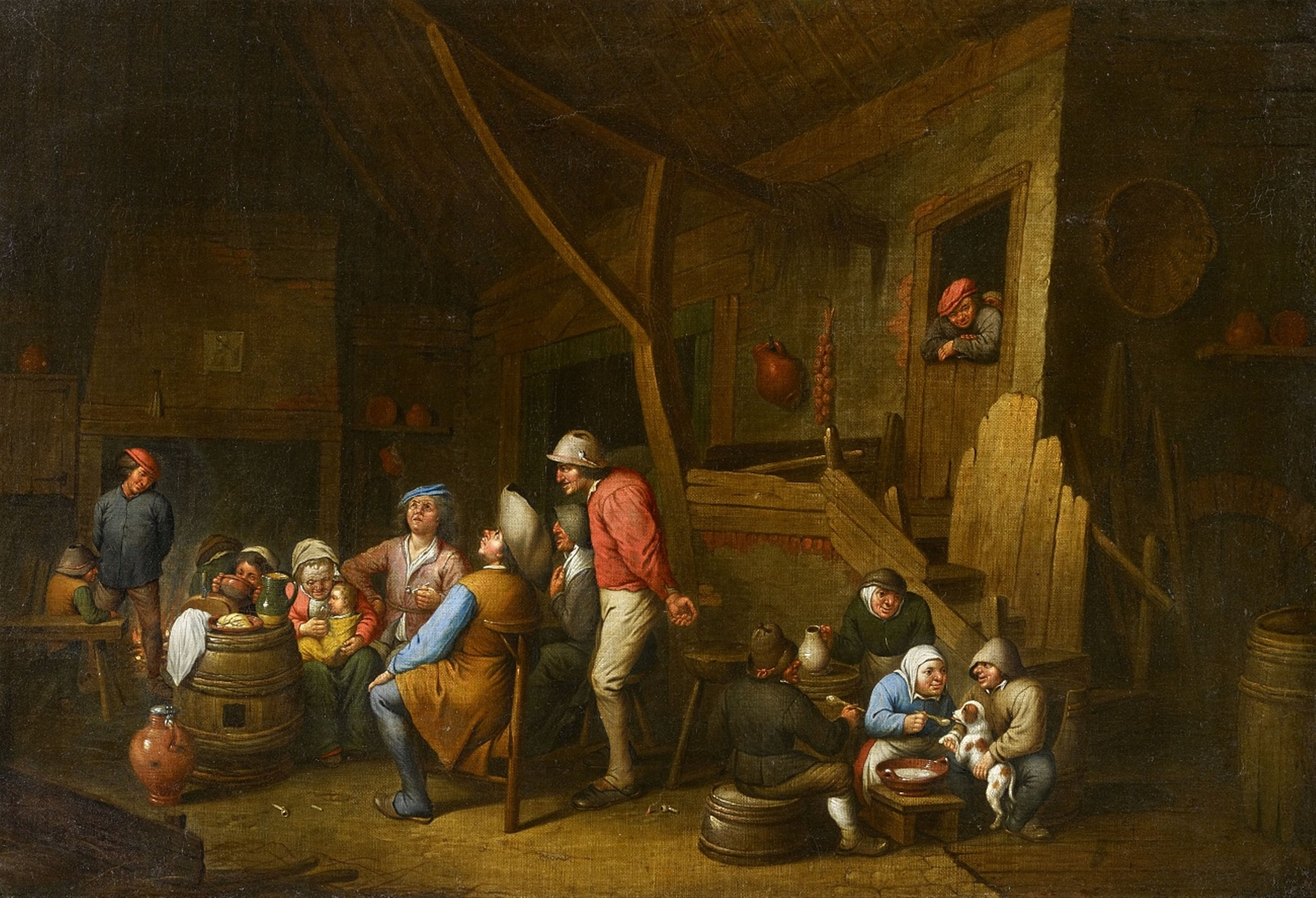
Peasants in a Tavern

Victor Mahu trained with his father and was accepted as a master in the Antwerp Guild of St Luke in 1689/1690. He was active in Antwerp until 1700, the year in which he died.

== Work ==
Victor Mahu is known for his genre scenes of drinkers, card and board game players, dancers, musicians, peasants, cooks, and maids, placed in tavern or kitchen interiors. His genre paintings are strongly influenced by those of his father whose work was close to that of Adriaen Brouwer, Adriaen van Ostade and David Teniers the Younger.
