= Jan de Groot (painter) =

Dutch painter

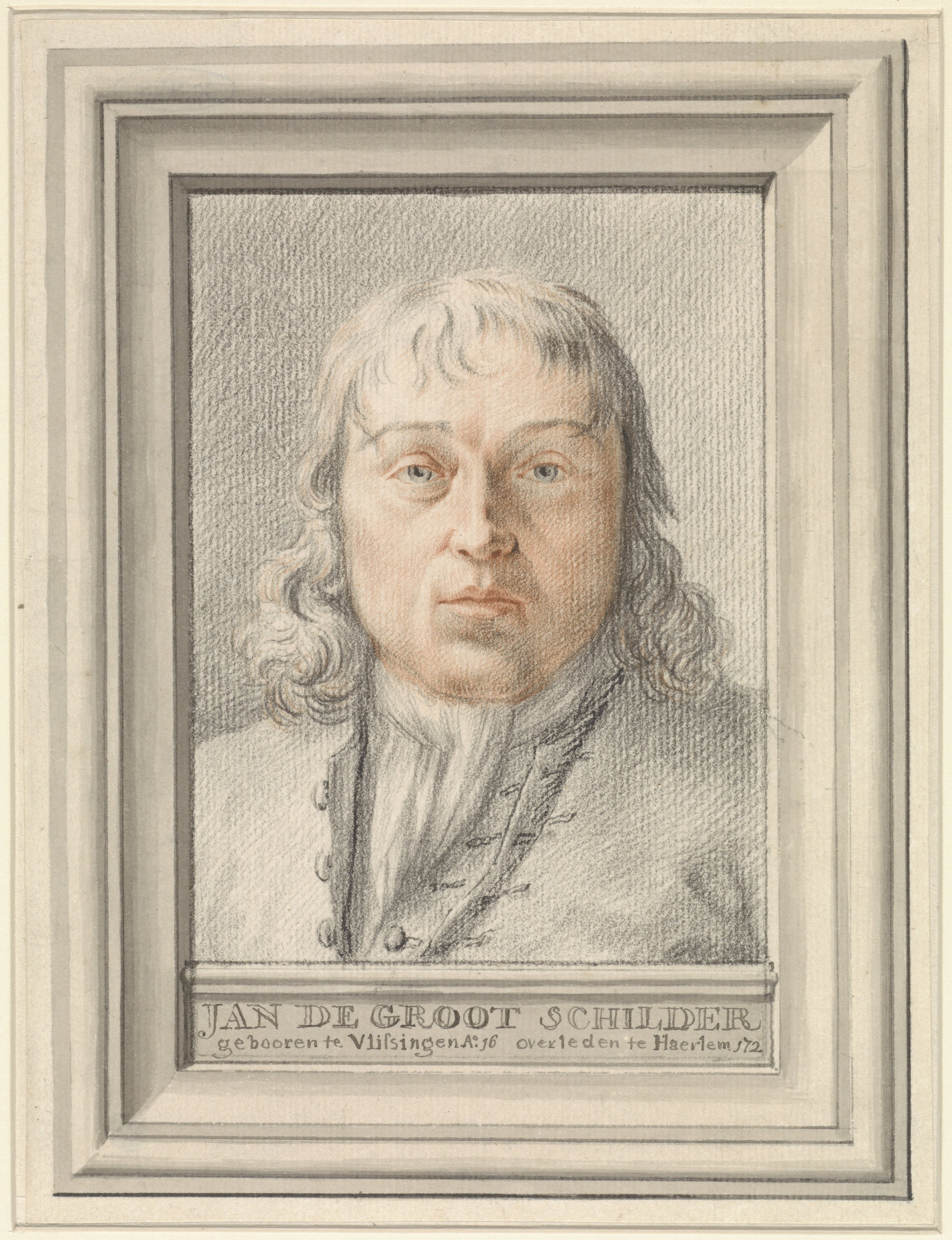
Portrait of Jan de Groot

Jan de Groot (1650 in Vlissingen – 1726 in Haarlem), was a Dutch Golden Age painter.

== Biography ==
According to Houbraken he first learned to paint in Vlissingen from Adriaen Verdoel, and later traveled to Haarlem where he studied with Adriaen van Ostade and Frans de Jong. Later in life he switched to dealing in coffee (Dutch: koffynering), a popular drink thanks to the increase in trade. He also became an art dealer in prints, drawings and paintings.

According to the RKD he was a student of Adriaen Verdoel, Frans de Jong, and Adriaen van Ostade. Some tavern interiors and genre pieces with farmers are known.
