= Cornelis Mahu =

Belgian painter

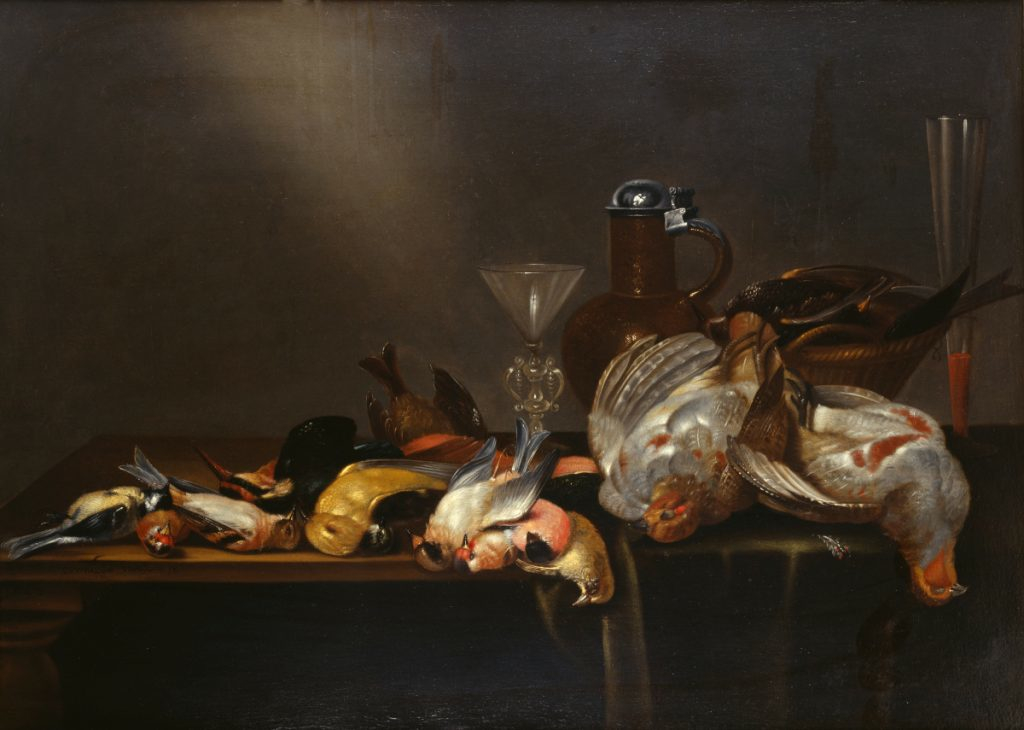
Still Life with Game Birds

Cornelis Mahu (1613 – 16 November 1689) was a Flemish painter of still lifes, genre paintings and seascapes who showed a very high level of craftsmanship in his compositions.

== Life ==
Mahu was born in Antwerp. Nothing is known about his training before he became master of the Guild of St. Luke in 1638. In 1633 he married Brigitta Wolfvoet, who was the daughter of the painter and art dealer Victor Wolfvoet I and brother of the painter Victor Wolfvoet II. It is possible that his father-in-law was his master.

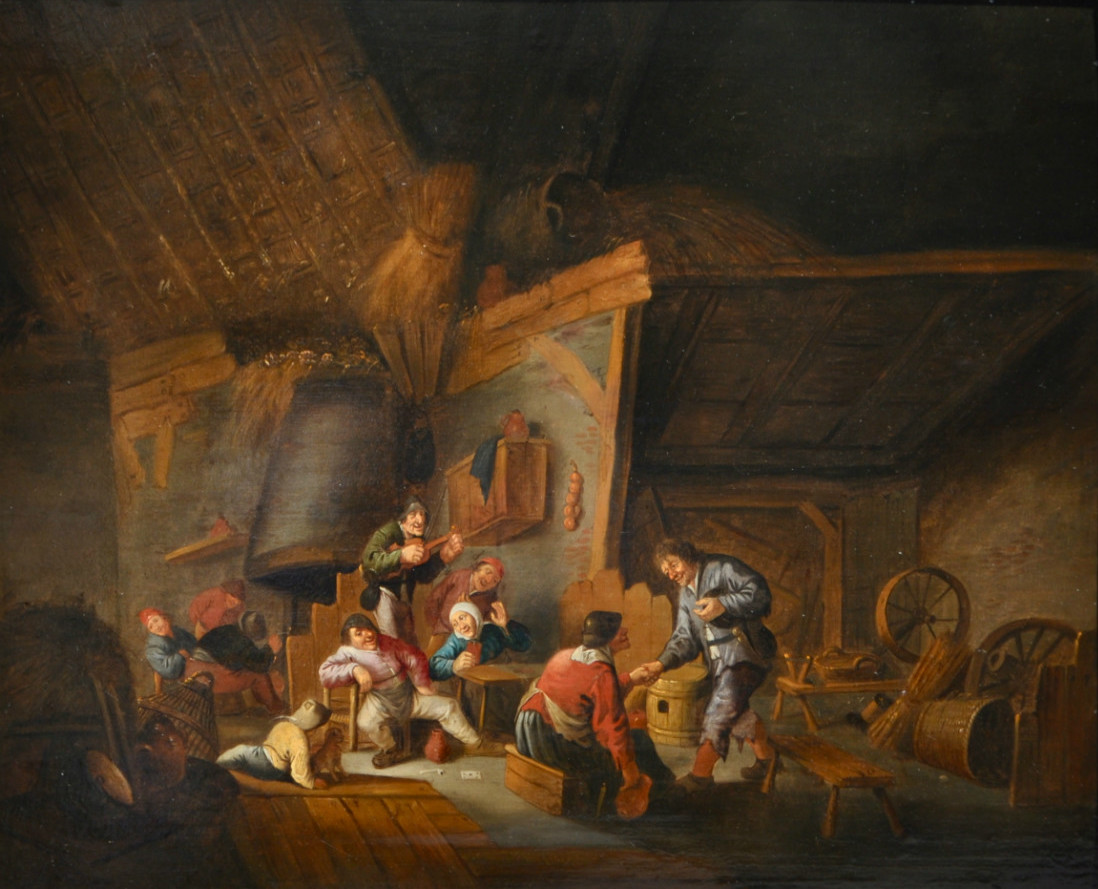
Tavern interior

In addition to his son Victor, he had three pupils of whom Gaspar Peeter Verbruggen the Elder is the best known. His son Victor (c. 1665 – 1700/01) continued painting genre scenes in the style of his father.

Mahu died in Antwerp in 1689,

== Work ==
Mahu was a versatile painted who practiced in various genres including still lifes, genre scenes and seascapes. He was not always an original painter but showed a very high level of craftsmanship in his compositions.

=== Still lifes ===
An important influence on his still lifes were the monochromatic "breakfast pieces" (ontbijtjes) or 'banquet pieces' (banketjes) of the Haarlem school of still life painters such as Pieter Claesz and Willem Claeszoon Heda. He stressed realism in his still lifes. He also painted Flemish style still lifes more in the style of Jan Pauwel Gillemans the Elder.

A good example of his still lifes is the Still life with an orange on a pewter plate, a porcelain pitcher, a glass, bread and a box of tobacco on a table (sold at the De Jonckheer Master Paintings). It shows in its arrangement of the various elements an influence of the Haarlem style. The work captures the spectator's eye with its vibrant contrasts of light and dark (chiaroscuro). The still life conveys the implicit message of vanitas so typical for northern European still lifes of the time. This message is conveyed through the usual symbols of the genre: the cut orange, which evokes the passing of life that is bitter in essence, and meaningless if not combined with a higher spiritual reality, and the burning candle, which inexorably measures time and the limits of our material and sensual aspirations.

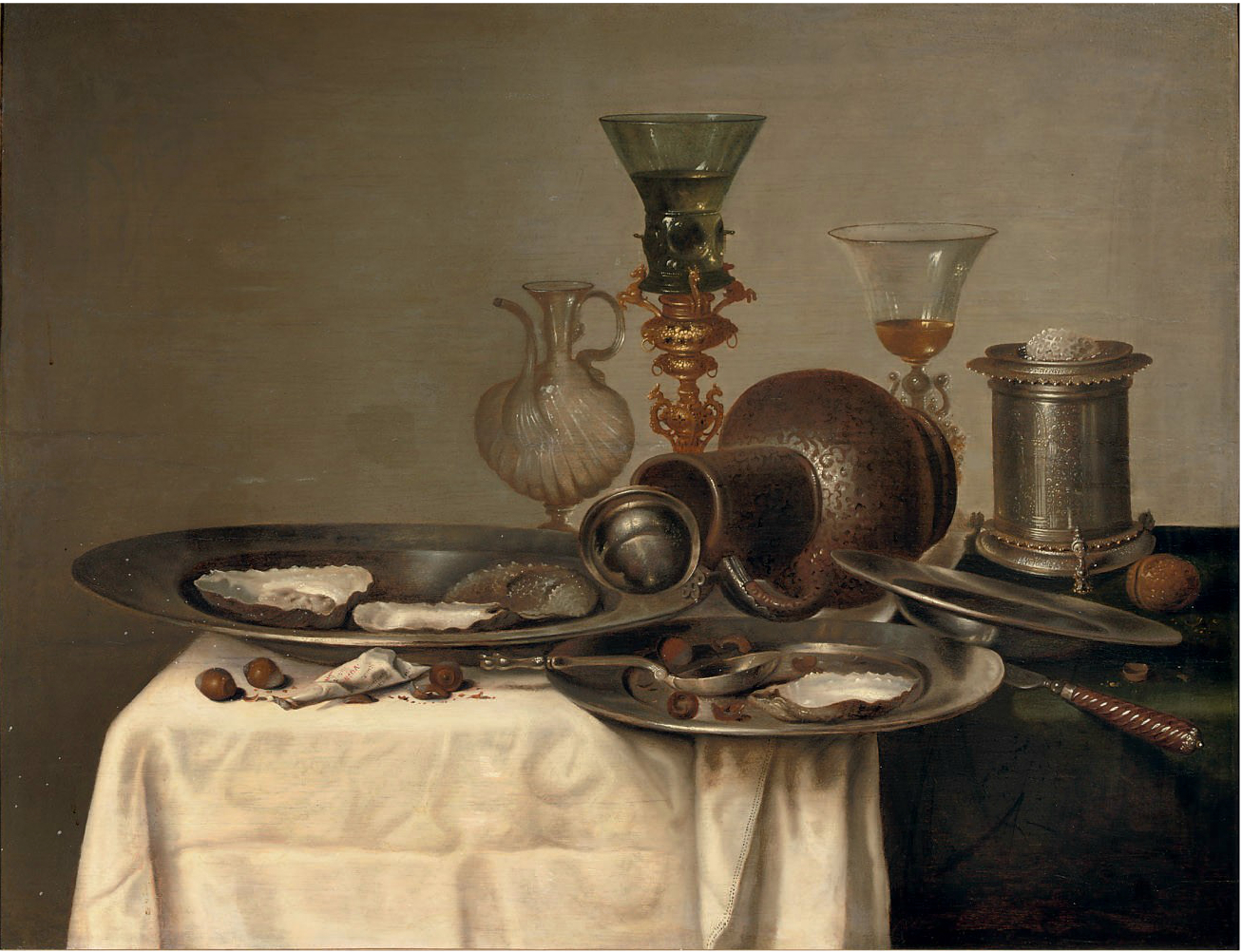
Oysters and hazelnuts on pewter dishes on a partly draped table

=== Genre scenes ===
Cornelis Mahu was a skilled painter of genre scenes depicted in an interior or outside setting. He was inspired by the various subjects developed by David Teniers the Younger, Adriaen van Ostade and Jan Miense Molenaer such as barn interiors, guardroom scenes and tavern interiors. These lively paintings are full of figures with exaggerated and rough features.

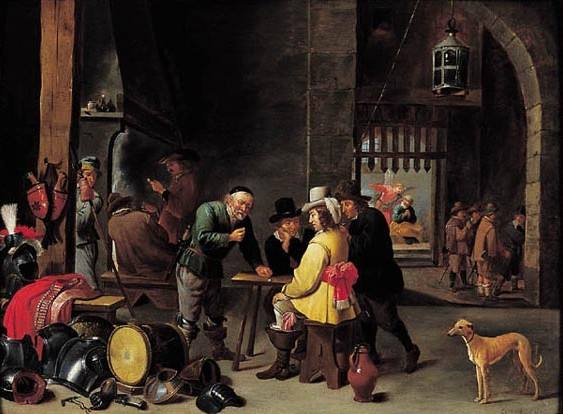
Guardroom with the Release of St. Peter

Cornelis Manu was one of a few Flemish artists who painted 'guardroom scenes'. Guardroom scenes are a type of genre scene that had become popular in the mid-17th century, particularly in the Dutch Republic. In Flanders there were also a few practitioners of the genre including David Teniers the Younger, Abraham Teniers, Anton Goubau, Gillis van Tilborch and Jan Baptist Tijssens the Younger. A guard room scene typically depicts an interior scene with officers and soldiers engaged in merrymaking. Guardroom scenes often included mercenaries and prostitutes dividing booty, harassing captives or indulging in other forms of reprehensible activities.

Mahu painted a Guardroom with the Release of St. Peter (Sold at Agraa Art on 17 October 2004), which is freely inspired by two compositions of David Teniers the Younger in the Wallace Collection and the Staatliche Kunstsammlungen in Dresden. Cornelis Mahu's work depicts soldiers and officers on three different planes engaging in various activities such as gambling, smoking and talking. At the front left there is a pile of weapons and a drum. The armour depicted in the picture was already out of date at the time it was painted since metal armours, breast plates and helmets fell out of use from the 1620s. It is possible that in line with the moralizing intent of the genre, the armour is a reference to the vanitas motif of the transience of power and fame. The composition also includes a religious scene of the 'Release of St. Peter', which is visible through a gate in the background of the painting. This inclusion of a religious scene in a larger composition is reminiscent of the work of 16th century painters in Antwerp such as Pieter Aertsen and Joachim Beuckelaer who placed small religious scenes in the background of lush scenes of markets.

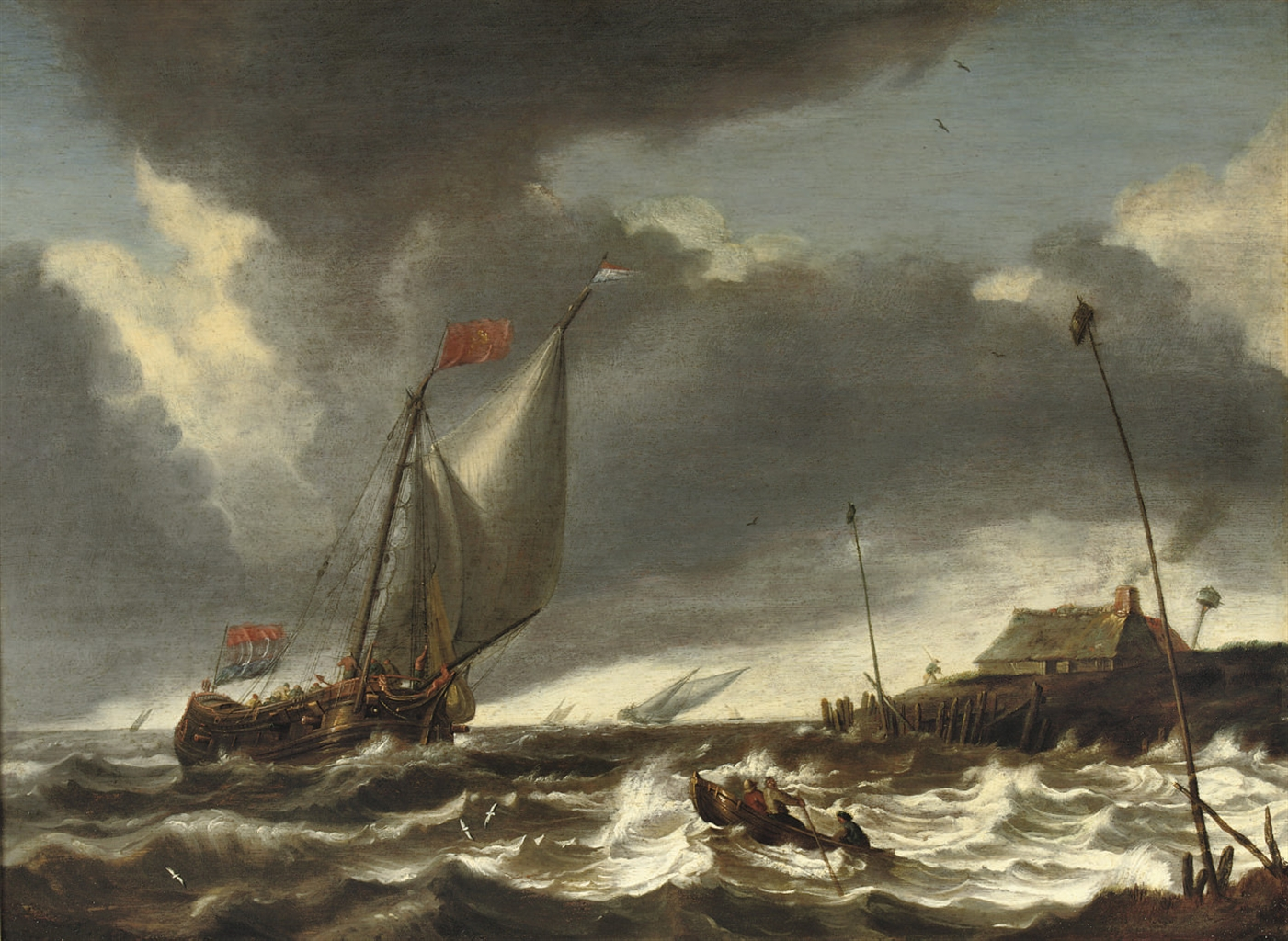
Shipping in stormy waters near a coast

=== Marine paintings ===
Although better known for his still lifes and genre scenes, Mahu produced a number of seascapes that show his originality. The seascapes usually depict ships on a wild sea occasionally with a harbour scene or ships in distress. His palette uses a mixture of greens and browns. Mahu's marine scenes with their heavy clouds and raging seas are similar to those of Bonaventura Peeters, the leading representative of the "monochrome" movement in marine painting. Other marine paintings show a similarity with those of the painter Jan Porcellis.
