= Adriaen Verdoel =

Dutch painter

Adriaen Verdoel I (c.1620–1675) was a Dutch Golden Age painter.

== Biography ==
Verdoel was born and died in Vlissingen. According to Houbraken he was a pupil of Rembrandt, though some claimed he was a pupil of Leonaert Bramer and Gaspar de Witte. He was respected for his historical allegories, and was also a good poet, who won a prize at his local Chamber of Rhetoric in Vlissingen in 1675.

According to the RKD he is registered as a pupil of Leonaert Bramer and Rembrandt, and was in Haarlem in 1649. He became the teacher of Jan de Groot (1650-1726).
