= Peter de Witte III =

Flemish Baroque painter (1617–1667)

Peter de Witte (1617, Antwerp, to 1667, Antwerp), was a Flemish Baroque painter.

== Biography ==
According to the Dutch biographer Arnold Houbraken, the painter whose name was spelled Peter de Wit was worthy of indexing in Houbraken's De groote schouburgh der Nederlantsche konstschilders en schilderessen (The Great Theatre of Dutch Painters) (1718), with a snippet of poetry about deWit by Cornelis de Bie that mentioned de Wit's talents as a landscape painter.

De Witte was the illegitimate son of Pieter de Witte II and the brother of Gaspar de Witte and Jan Baptist. After learning to paint landscapes from his father, he travelled to Italy, and on his return he became a member of the Antwerp Guild of St. Luke in 1646. His pupil was Philips Bonnecroy. No works have been attributed to him specifically, though de Bie's poem mentions various birds, and a bird illustration decorates the page of the book with the poem on it.
