= Jan Baptist Tijssens the Younger =

Flemish painter

Jan Baptist Tijssens the Younger (1660–1723) was a Flemish painter mainly known for his 'guardroom scenes' and still lifes. He was also active as an art dealer.

== Life ==
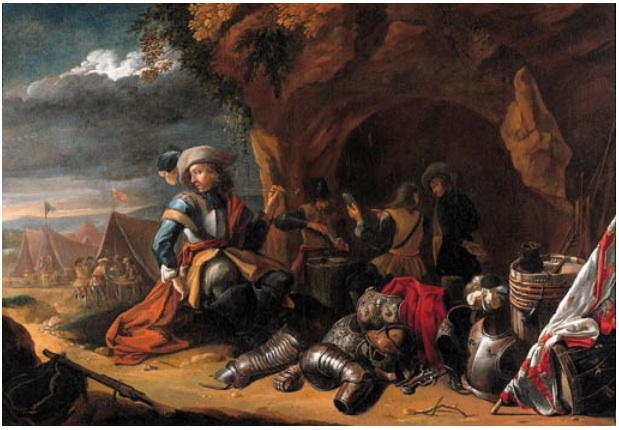
An officer smoking a pipe by a grotto

Jan Baptist Tijssens the Younger was baptized on 21 September 1660 in Antwerp as the third son of Augustijn Tijssens the Younger (1623–1675) and Maria Laureyssens, a niece of Jacob Jordaens. His father was a landscape artist and painter. His grandfathers Augustijn Tijssens the Elder and Peter Laureyssens were art dealers. His uncle Jan Baptist Tijssens the Elder was a landscape and religious painter. Jan Baptist Tijssens the Younger and Jan Baptist Tijssens the Elder are often confused with each other. His younger brother Jacobus or Jacomo became a portrait and landscape painter.

He was a pupil of his father and Anton Goubau, a leading genre and history painter who had studied in Italy. He became a master in the Guild of Saint Luke in 1689/90 and was active in Antwerp from 1688 to 1691. In 1691 he became co-dean of the Guild but bought himself free from his Guild obligations with a picture. He travelled to Italy. He was recorded in Düsseldorf where he worked for a while as an art dealer for the Elector. He was in Rotterdam in 1695 and is also recorded in Breda and in England.

As an art dealer he is known to have traded two Ribera's and Rubens works with Suzanna Forchondt, daughter of Guillam Forchondt and Mary Lemmens. The documents showed a wax seal on the back with the initials P and L. The letters refer to the name of his grandfather Peter Laureyssens. Jann Baptist had inherited this mark from his grandfather.

Tijssens died in his birthplace Antwerp on 4 October 1723.

== Work ==
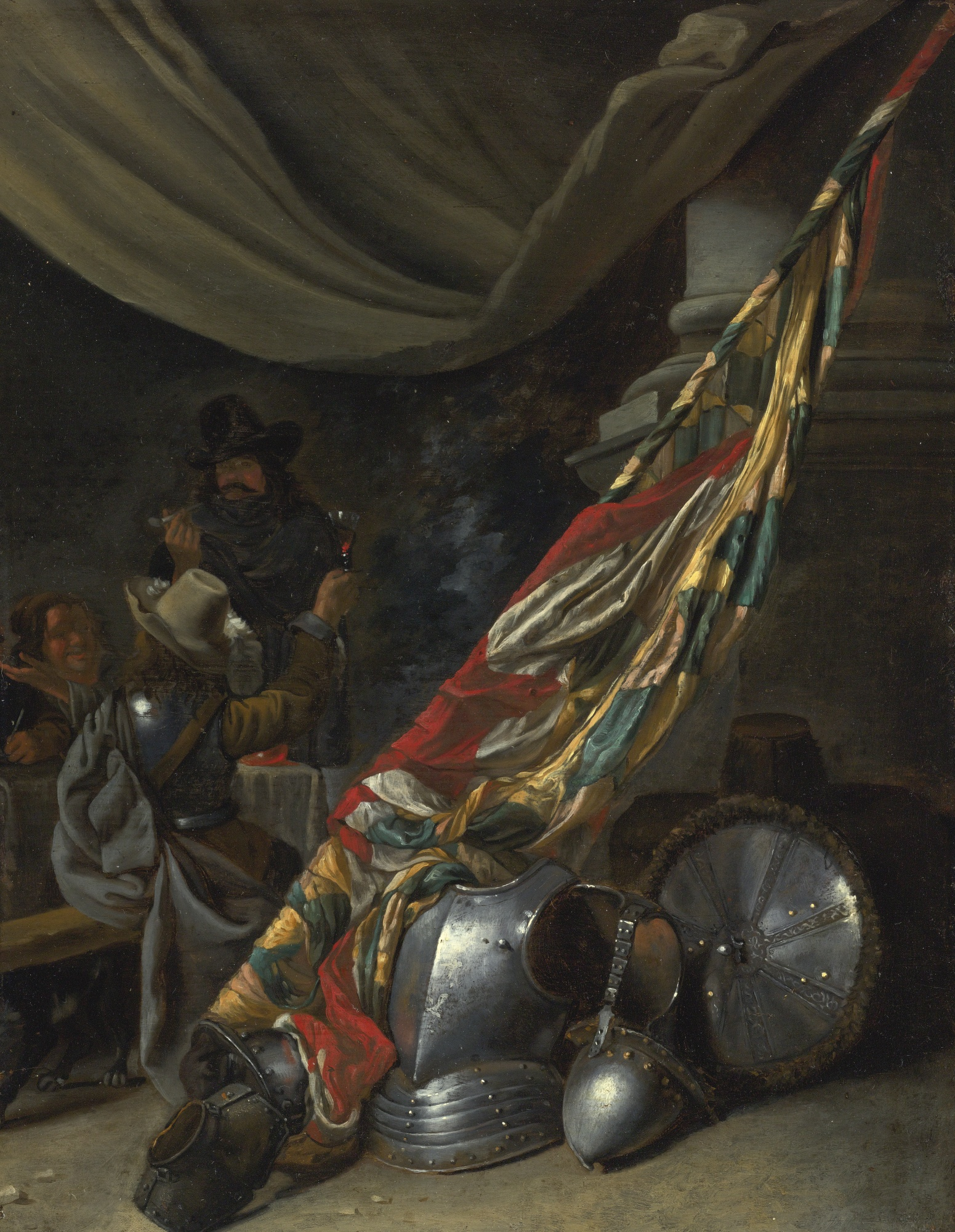
Guardroom interior with armour and a standard behind

He is mainly known for his genre scenes and still lifes but also painted mythological and Christian religious scenes. His still lifes are mainly still lifes of armour in addition to a few hunting pieces.

He was specialized in 'guardroom scenes', a type of genre scene that had become popular in the mid-17th century, particularly in the Dutch Republic. In Flanders there were also a few practitioners of the genre including David Teniers the Younger, Abraham Teniers, Tijssens' master Anton Goubau, Cornelis Mahu and Gillis van Tilborch. A guard room scene typically depicts an interior scene with officers and soldiers engaged in merrymaking. Guardroom scenes often included mercenaries and prostitutes dividing booty, harassing captives or indulging in other forms of reprehensible activities. Tilborch painted a Guardroom Interior with Armour and a Standard Behind (sold at Sotheby's on 10 July 2004 in London, lot 172), which depicts two soldiers and a woman drinking and smoking in a room. The soldiers are almost completely hidden behind a pile of weapons and a war standard. In its general arrangement and specific details such as the figures and the armour on the floor the painting is based on the signed composition of Tijssens' master Anton Goubau in the National Gallery in Prague. The Goubau painting continues to the left into a horizontal composition. It is likely that Tijssens' painting was cut down as on the extreme left margin the nose, moustache and chin of the figure next to the woman are visible. The original painting may therefore have been similar in composition to that of Goubau. The armour depicted in the picture was already out of date at the time it was painted since metal armours, breast plates and helmets fell out of use from the 1620s. It is possible that in line with the moralizing intent of the genre, the armour is a reference to the vanitas motif of the transience of power and fame.
