= Convent of las Comendadoras de Santiago (Madrid) =

- Convento de las Comendadoras de Santiago (Spanish)
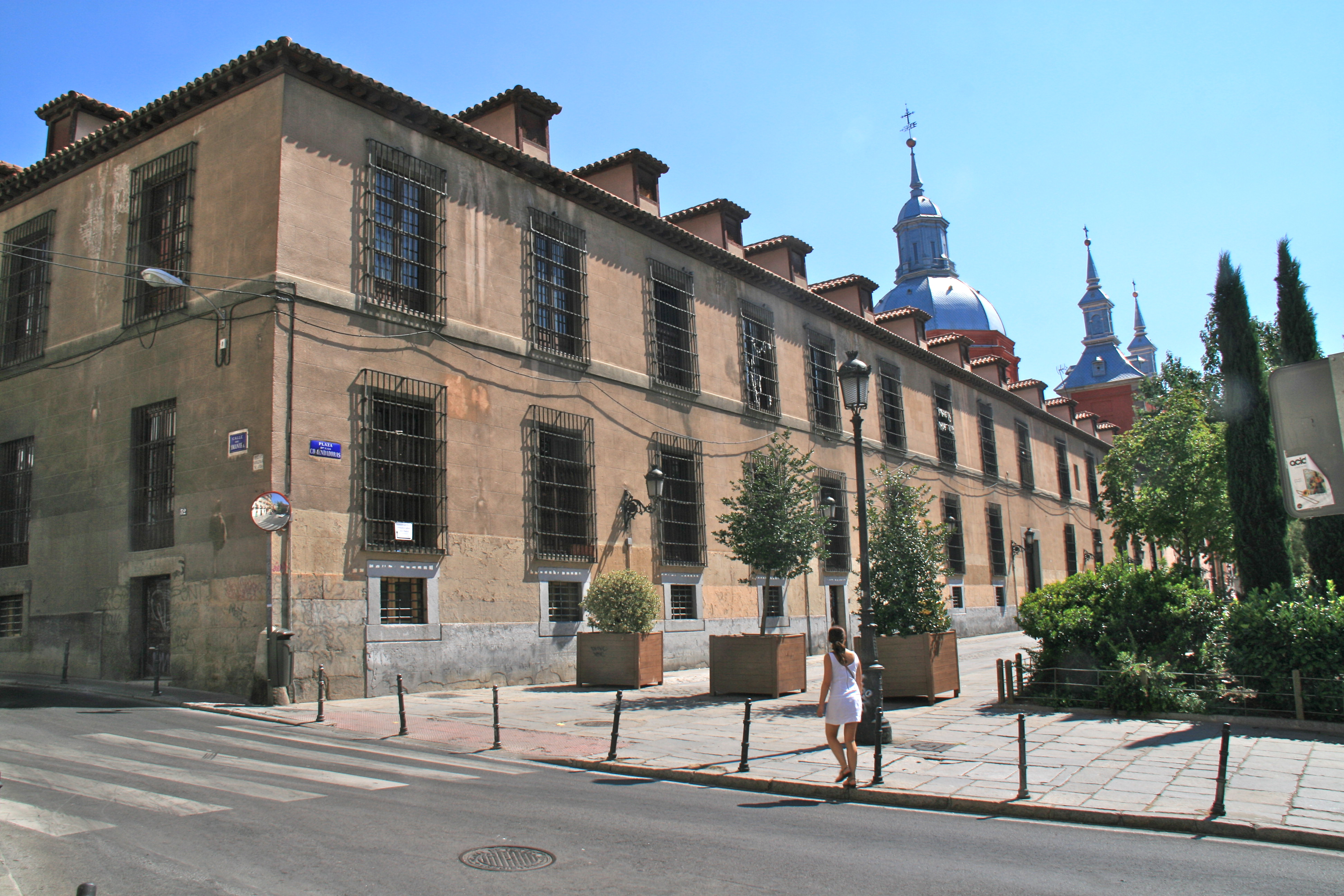

- Location within Spain
- 40.42737°N 3.708868°W
- Location: Madrid, Spain

Spanish Cultural Heritage
- Official name: Convento de las Comendadoras de Santiago
- Type: Non-movable
- Criteria: Monument
- Designated: 1970
- Reference no.: RI-51-0003853

The Convent of las Comendadoras de Santiago (Spanish: Convento de las Comendadoras de Santiago) is a convent located in Madrid, Spain. It was declared Bien de Interés Cultural in 1970.

The convent was transformed into a male prison for Republican prisoners during the Civil War, only returning to its original function as a convent in 1941.

The convent reopened in autumn of 2024 after two decades of restoration.
