= Abraham Teniers =

Flemish painter and engraver (1629–1670)

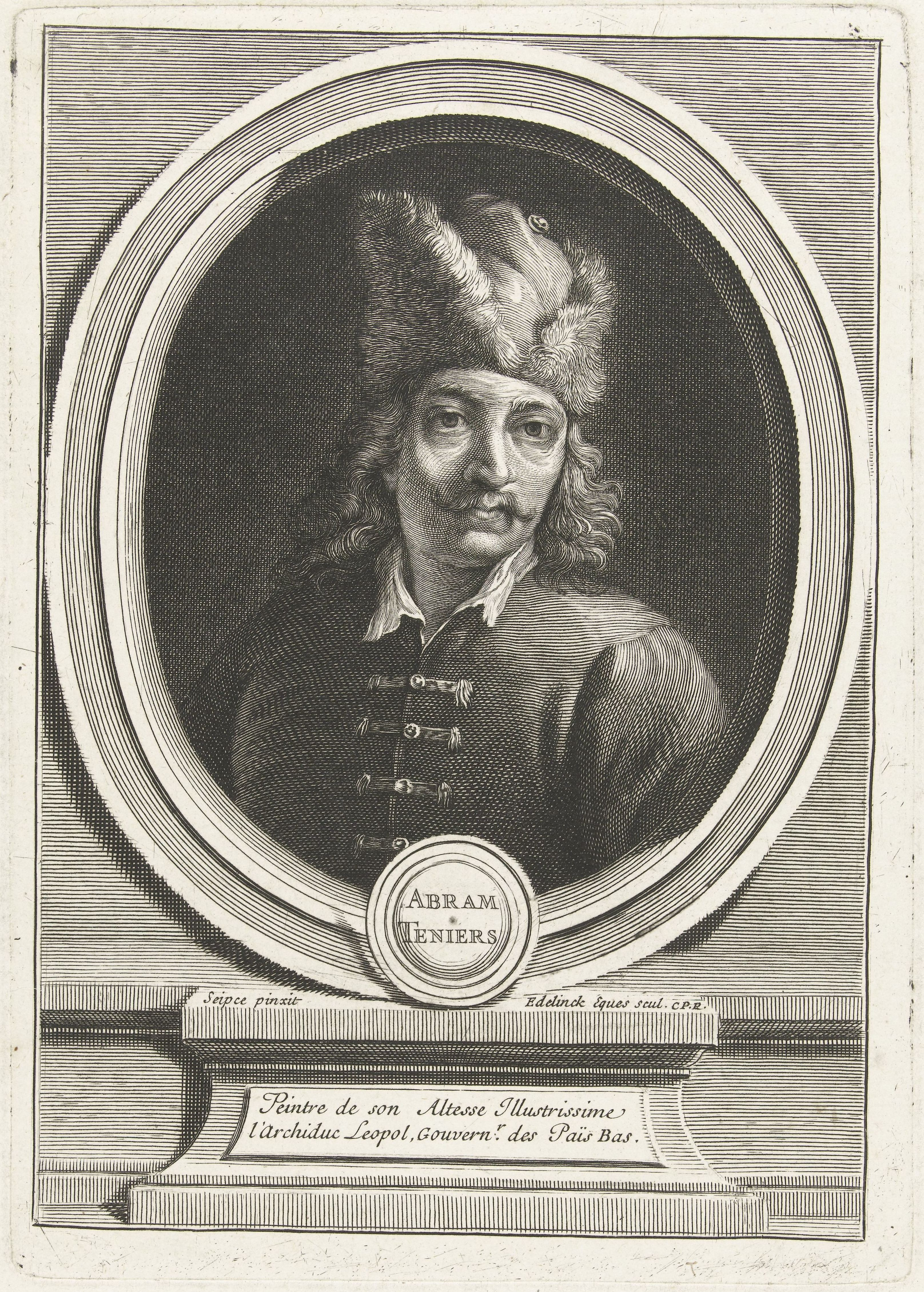
Portrait of Abraham Teniers by Gérard Edelinck

Abraham Teniers (1 March 1629 – 26 September 1670) was a Flemish painter and engraver who specialized in genre paintings of villages, inns and monkey scenes. He was a member of artist family Teniers which came to prominence in the 17th century. He was also active as a publisher.

== Life ==
Abraham Teniers was born in Antwerp where he was baptized on 1 March 1629. He was the son of the prominent genre painter David Teniers the Elder and Dymphna Cornelisse de Wilde (also called 'Dymphna Hendrikx'). Three of his brothers were also painters: David the Younger (1610–90) who became the most successful of the Teniers painting dynasty, Juliaan III (1616–79) and Theodoor (1619–97).

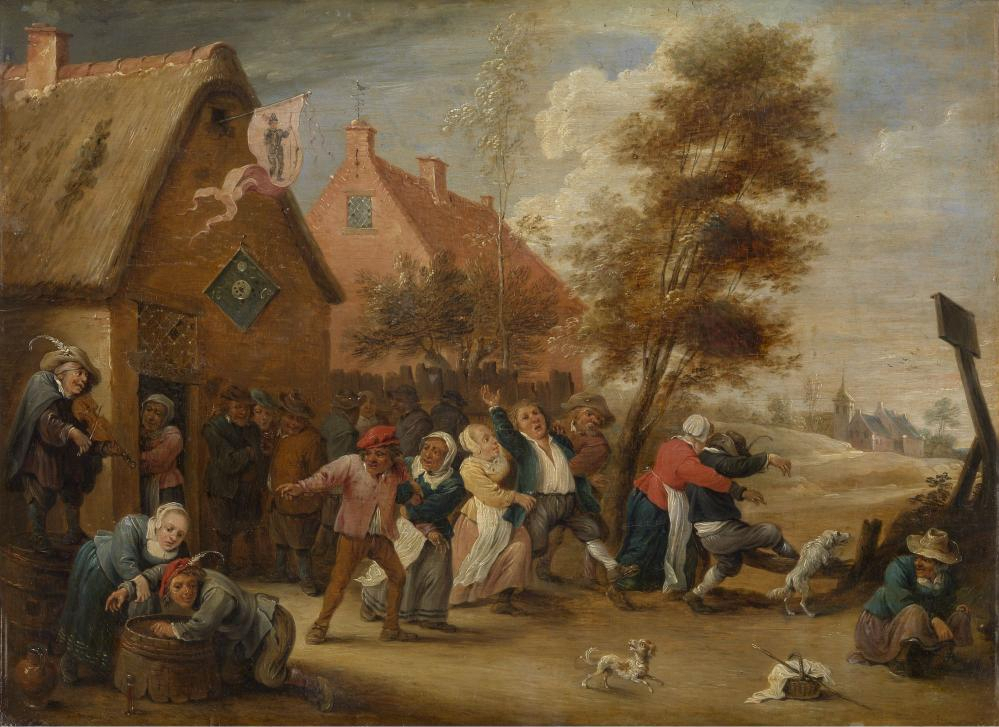
Rural feast

Abraham Teniers likely trained with his father and older brother David. He was admitted as a 'wijnmeester' (i.e. son of a master) in the Antwerp Guild of Saint Luke in 1646.

Abraham married Isabelle de Roore on 16 July 1644. He was a captain of the local schutterij (civil militia) of Antwerp. He was active in the local chamber of rhetoric called the 'Olyftack' ('Olive branch') where he was received as a captain in 1660. In the Guild year 1661-62 Franciscus Bock was registered as his pupil.

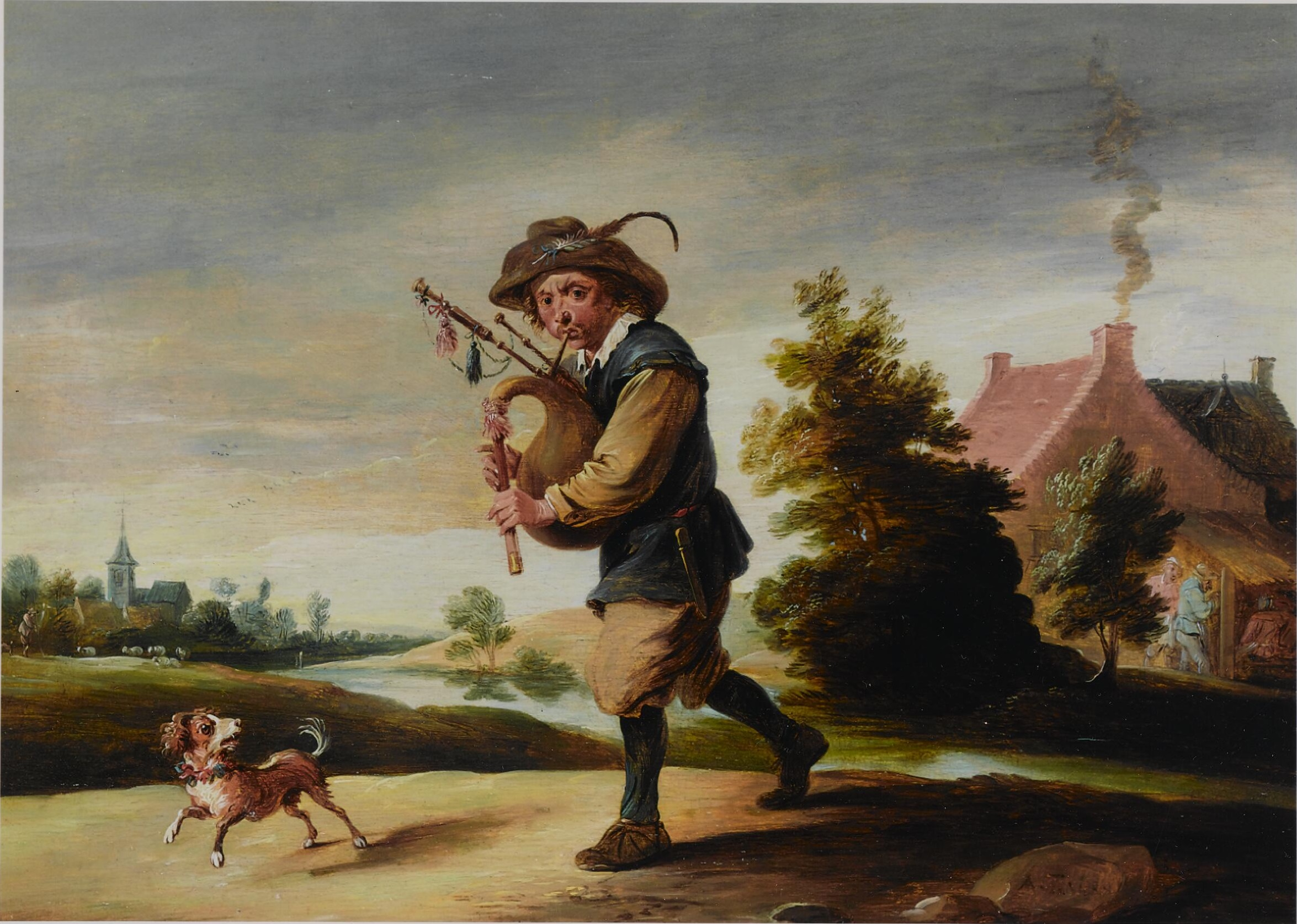
A peasant playing a bagpipe in a landscape

Like his brother David before him, Abraham found appreciation at the court in Brussels and the art-loving Archduke Leopold Wilhelm of Austria – then the governor of the Southern Netherlands and a resident of Brussels – appointed him as court painter.

Abraham died in Antwerp.

== Work ==
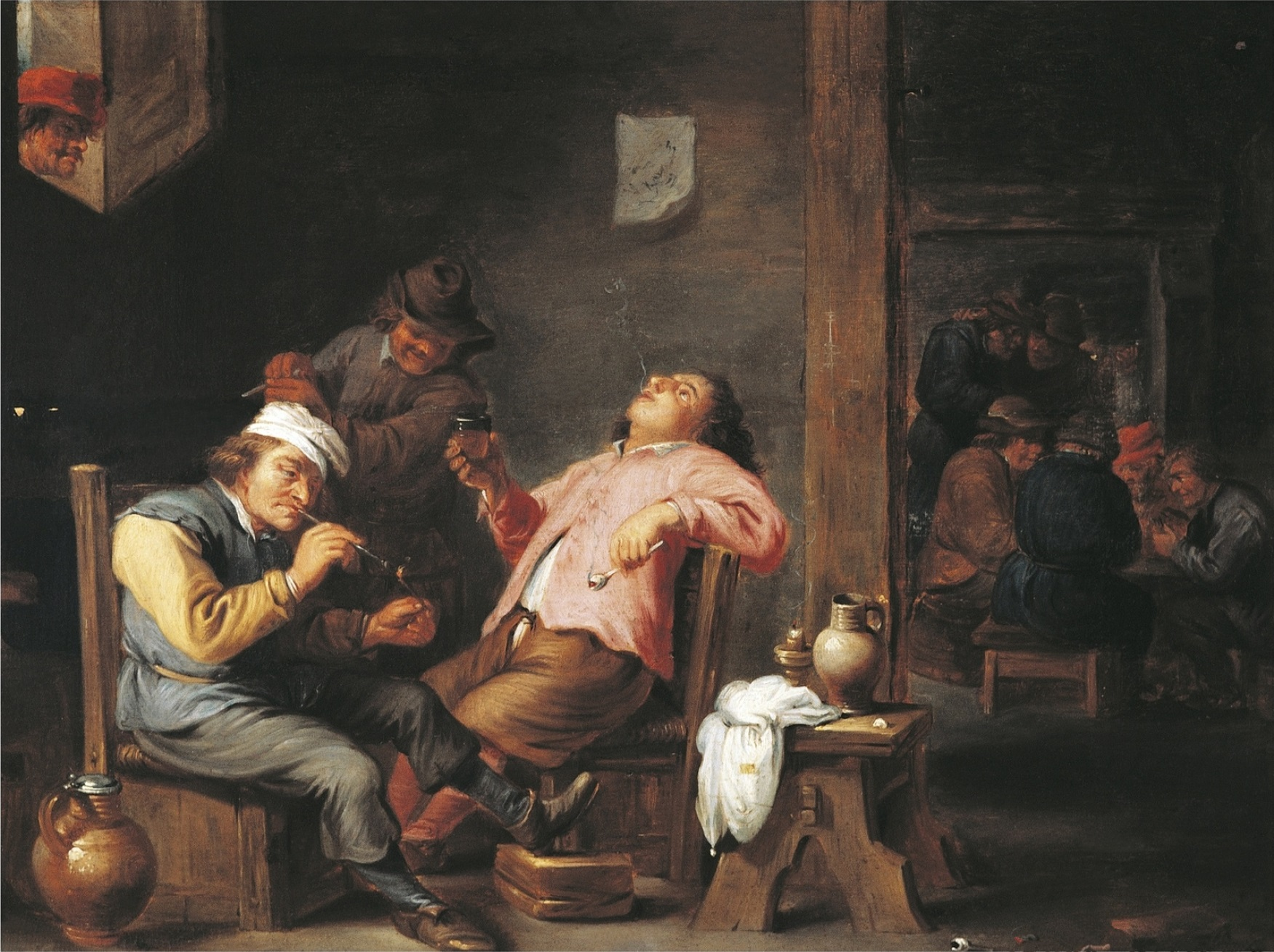
Drinker and smokers in a tavern

=== General ===
Abraham Teniers is mainly known for his genre scenes which depict themes and are executed in a style not dissimilar to those of his father and brother David who are his presumed teachers. His favorite subjects were villages with peasant dancing or playing music, inns with peasants indulging in drink, food and smoking and monkey scenes.

=== Guardroom Scenes ===
If the attributions by the Prado Museum are correct, Abraham painted two Guardroom Scenes now held in the collection of the Prado Museum. A guardroom scene is a type of genre scene that became popular in the mid-17th century, particularly in the Dutch Republic. In Flanders there were also a few practitioners of the genre including David Teniers the Younger, Anton Goubau, Cornelis Mahu and Jan Baptist Tijssens the Younger.

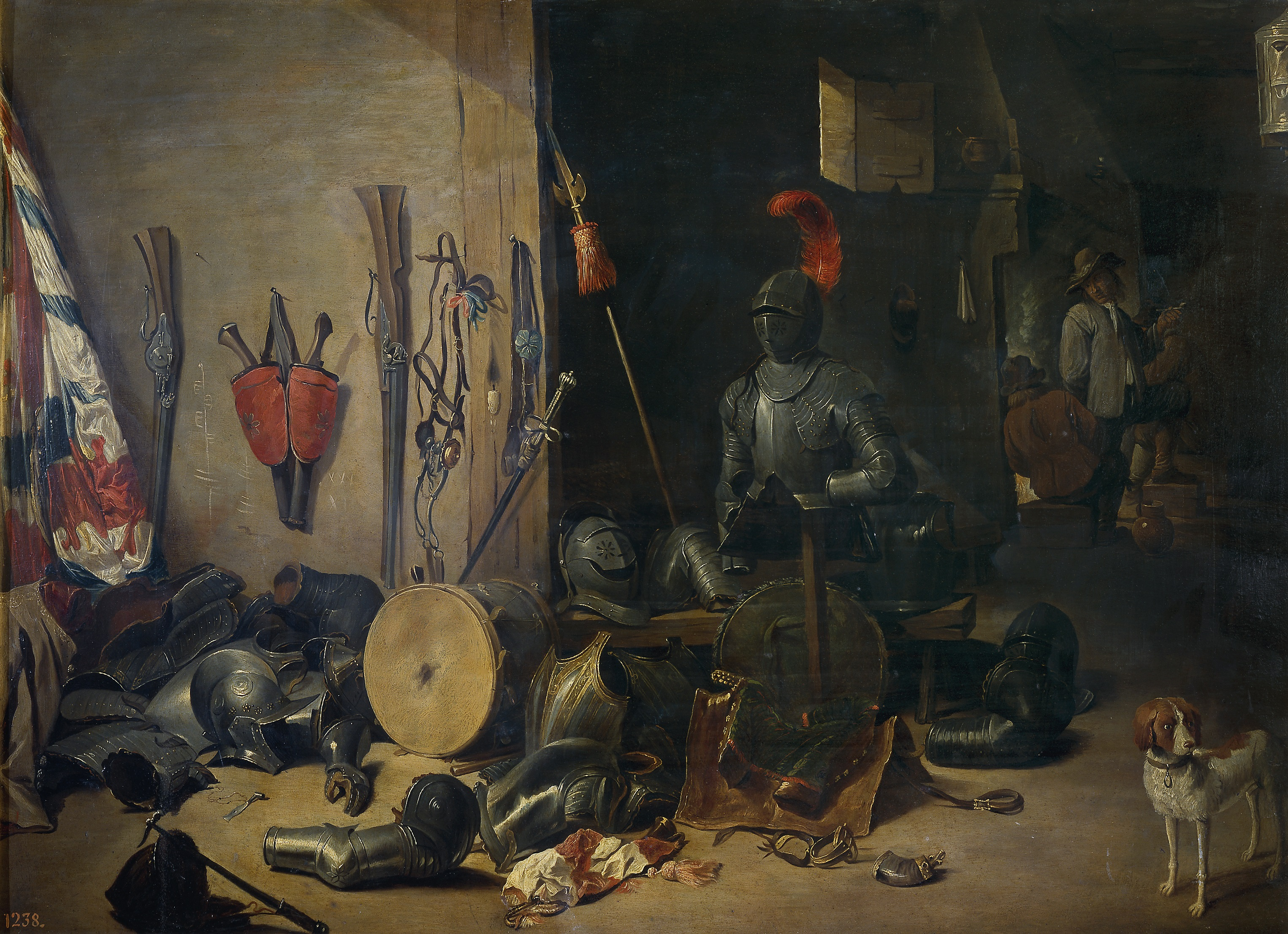
Guardroom scene

A guardroom scene typically depicts an interior scene with officers and soldiers engaged in merrymaking. Guardroom scenes often included mercenaries and prostitutes dividing booty, harassing captives or indulging in other forms of reprehensible activities. The first Guardroom Scene attributed to Abraham Teniers depicts a guardroom with a black servant and a pile of weapons, a saddle and a war standard in the foreground and some soldiers gathering around a fire in the background.

In the second Guardroom Scene attributed to Abraham Teniers the guardroom is dominated by the jumble of disjointed metal armours, breast plates, a drum, weaponry and helmets in the foreground while the peasant soldiers smoking a pipe or drinking in front of a fireplace are kept in the shadows in the background of the picture. The armour depicted in the two pictures was already out of date at the time it was painted since metal armours, breast plates and helmets fell out of use from the 1620s. It is possible that in line with the moralizing intent of the genre, the armour is a reference to the vanitas motif of the transience of power and fame.

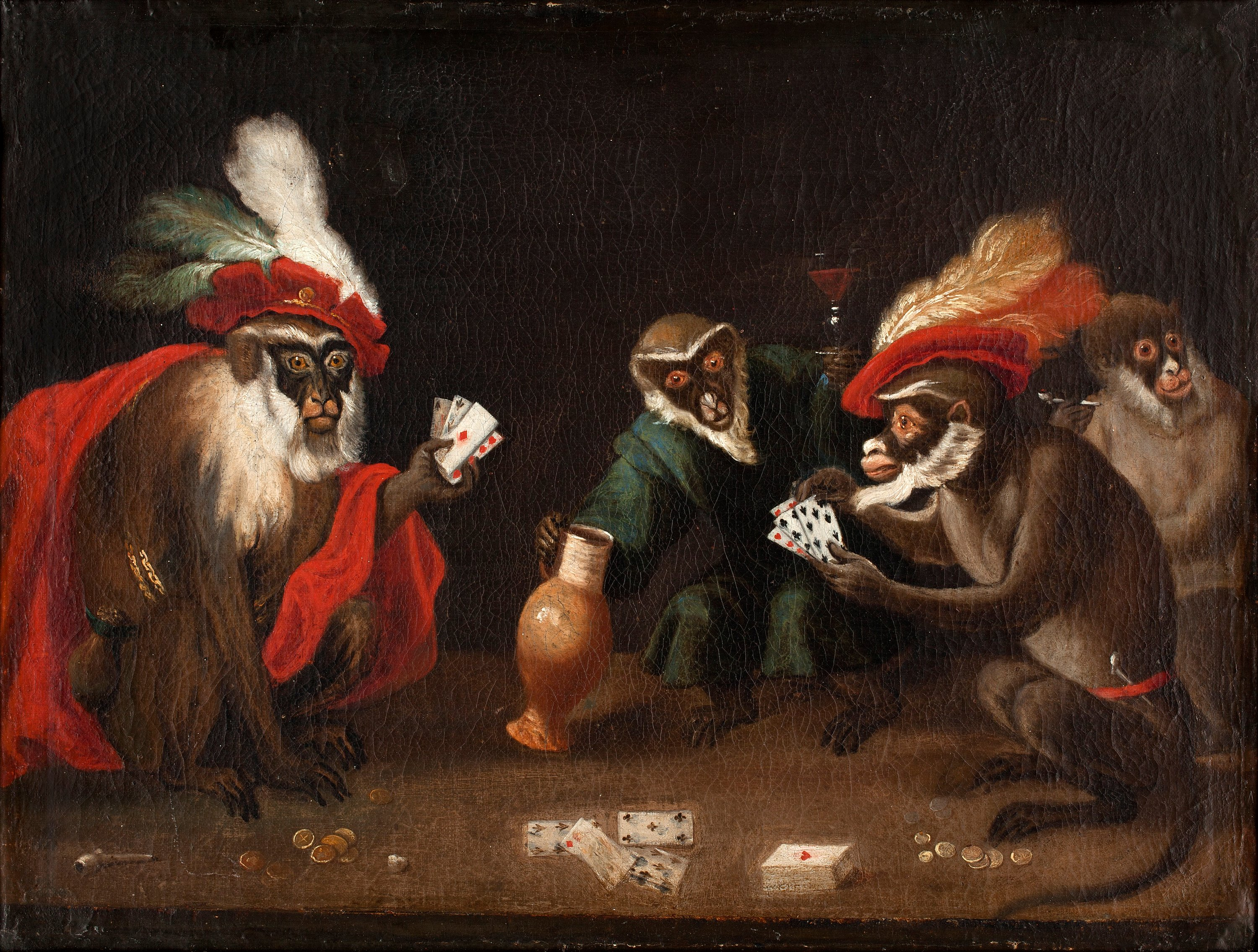
Monkeys playing cards

Abraham Teniers combined the genres of singerie and guardroom scene in the composition Singerie in a Guardroom now in the Royal Museums of Fine Arts of Belgium.

=== Singeries ===
Abraham Teniers contributed to the spread of the genre of the 'monkey scene', also called 'singerie' (a word, which in French means a 'comical grimace, behaviour or trick'). Comical scenes with monkeys appearing in human attire and a human environment are a pictorial genre that was initiated in Flemish painting in the 16th century and was subsequently further developed in the 17th century. The Flemish engraver Pieter van der Borcht introduced the singerie as an independent theme around 1575 in a series of prints, which are strongly embedded in the artistic tradition of Pieter Bruegel the Elder. These prints were widely disseminated and the theme was then picked up by other Flemish artists in particular by those in Antwerp such as Frans Francken the Younger, Jan Brueghel the Elder and the Younger, Sebastiaen Vrancx and Jan van Kessel the Elder.

David Teniers the Younger became the principal practitioner of the genre and developed it further with his younger brother Abraham. The two brothers were able to cater to the prevailing taste in the art market and were thus instrumental in spreading the genre outside Flanders. Later in the 17th century artists like Nicolaes van Verendael, principally known as a painter of flower still lifes started to paint 'monkey scenes' as well.

=== Engravings ===
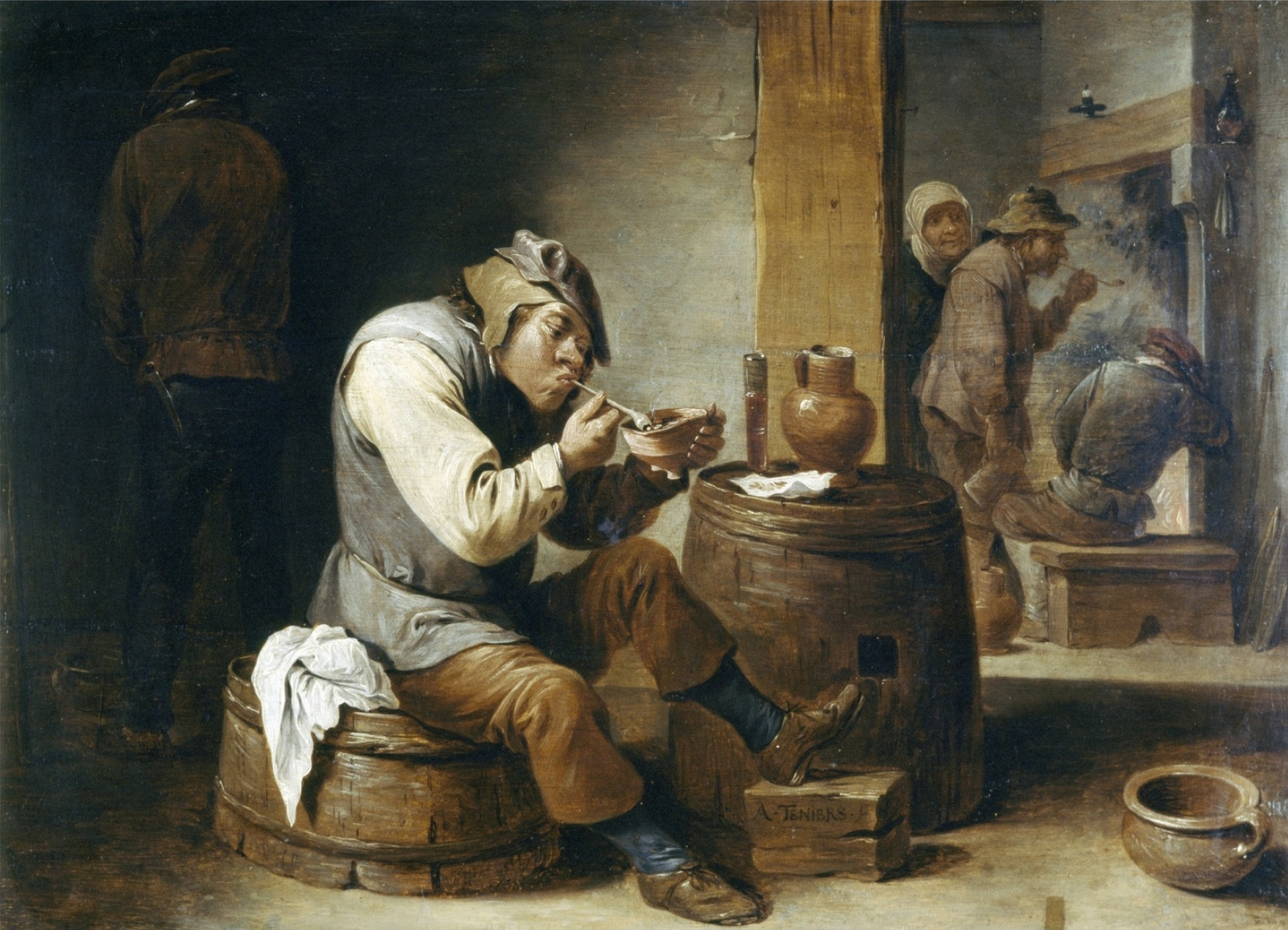
Smokers and drinkers

Abraham Teniers was a skilled engraver and is known for his engravings made principally after works of his brother David. An example is the engraving by Abraham of the Village Fair after a design by David.

=== Publishing ===
Abraham Teniers was further active as a publisher. He was responsible for the publication of the Theatrum Pictorium ('Theatre of Paintings'), the project initiated by his brother David to make a set of engravings of the entire art collection of Archduke Leopold Wilhelm. As the director of the Archduke's art collection, David had initially conceived this plan but ultimately only a series of 246 plates was produced by several engravers (243 of these represented about half of the Italian paintings then owned by the Archduke). Abraham Teniers published the first edition in 1658 as loose leaves and unnumbered.

Abraham also published prints made by various engravers after the work of his brother David.
