= David Rijckaert =

David Rijckaert or Ryckaert may refer to any of these Flemish painters active in Antwerp in the 17th century:

- David Rijckaert I
- David Rijckaert II (1586–1642), Flemish painter and art dealer
- David Ryckaert III (1612–1661), Flemish painter
