= Pieter Thijs =

Flemish painter (1624–1677)

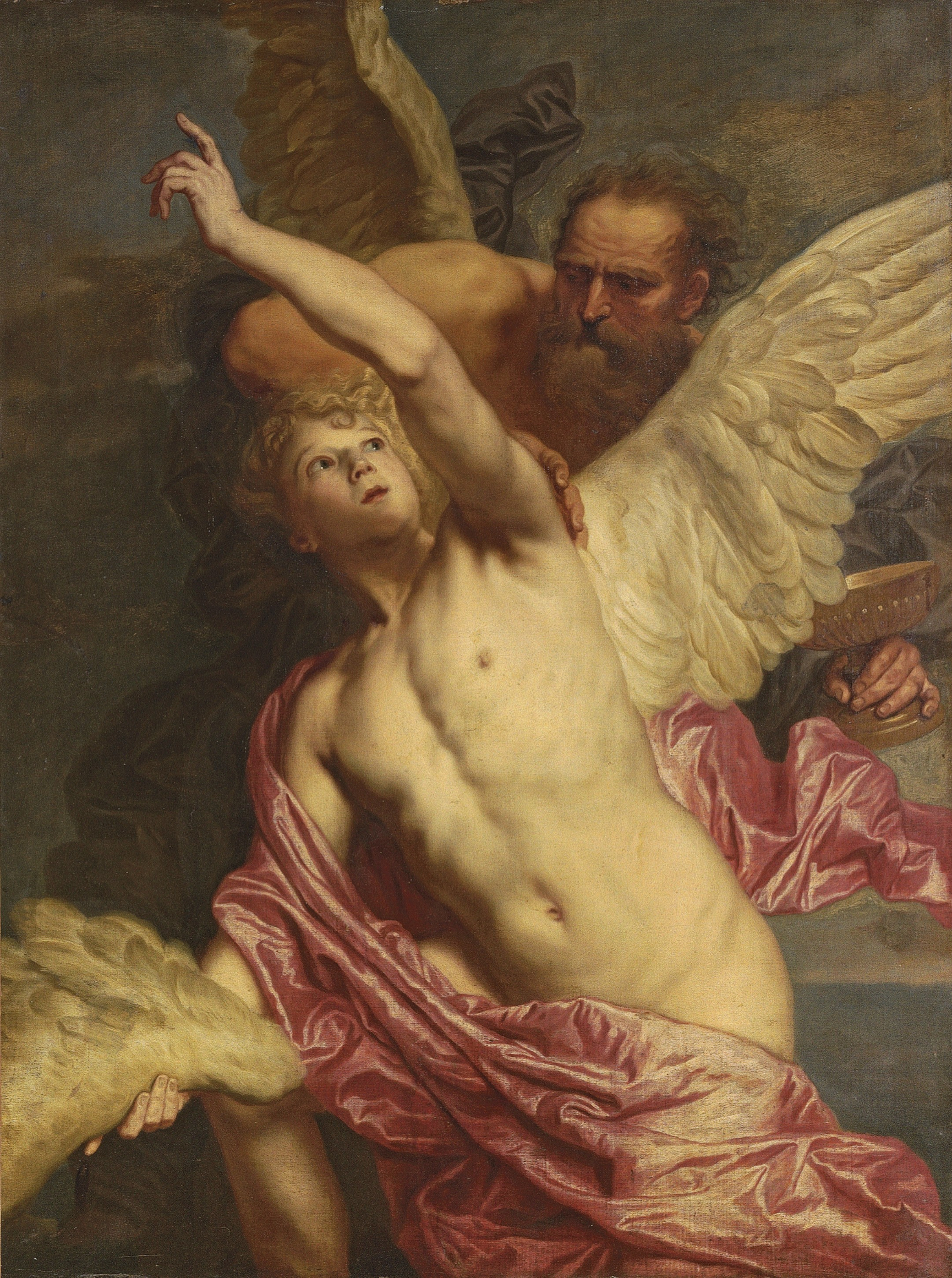
Daedalus fixing wings onto the shoulders of Icarus

Pieter Thijs, Peter Thijs or Pieter Thys (1624 in Antwerp – 1677 in Antwerp) was a Flemish painter of portraits as well as religious and history paintings. He was a very successful artist who worked for the courts in Brussels and The Hague as well as for many religious institutions. His work was close to the courtly and elegant style of Anthony van Dyck and his followers.

== Life ==
Pieter Thijs was born in a modest family as the son of the baker Pieter (Peter) Thijs en Anna Vasseur. Thijs had three masters. He trained with the obscure painter Artus Deurwerdeers as a cabinet painter, in the style practiced in the workshop of Frans Francken the Younger, the father-in-law of Deurwerdeers. It is only after moving to the workshop of Anthony van Dyck that Thijs learned portrait and history painting and started copying the great masters. He is considered to be van Dyck's last pupil.

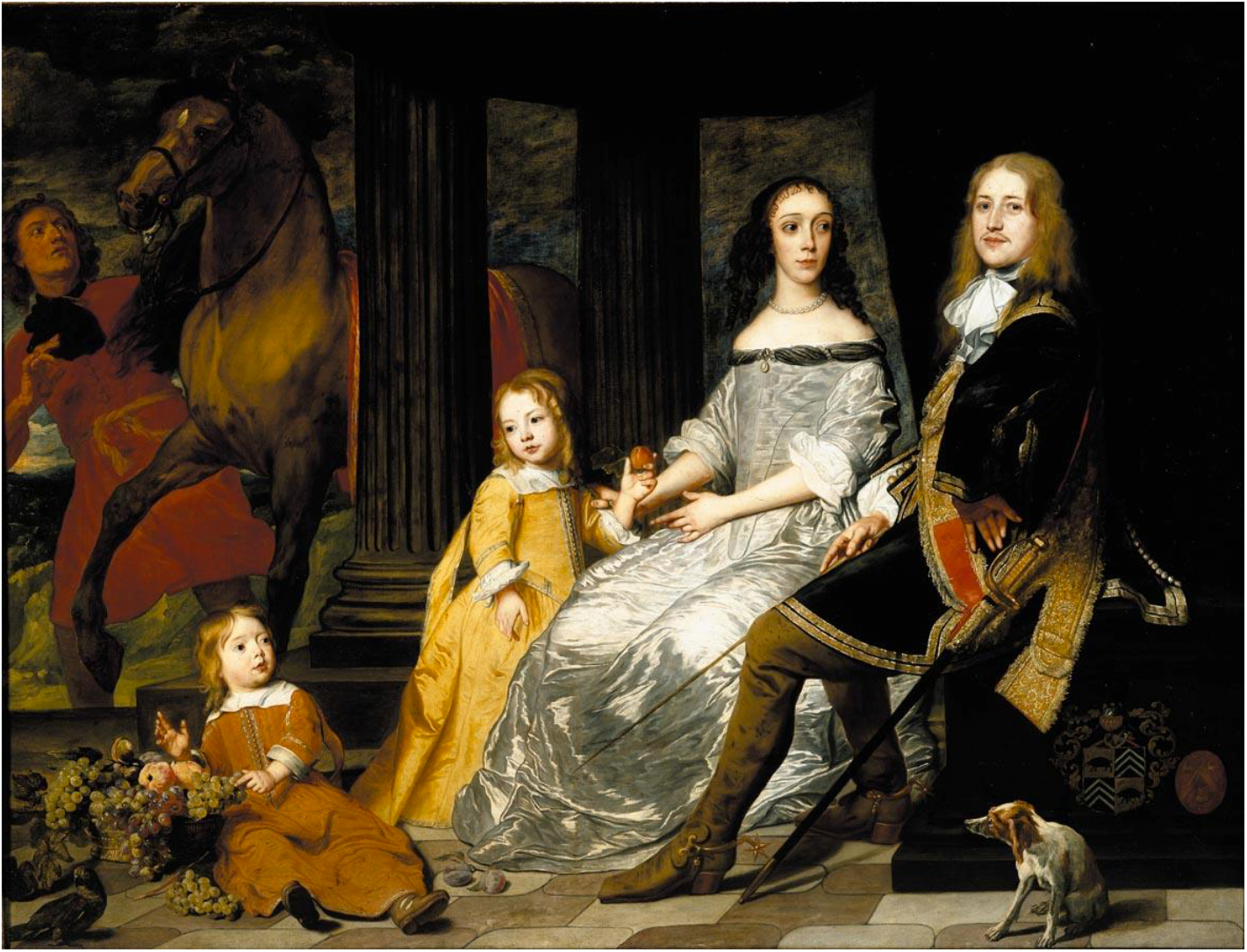
Portrait of the Van de Werve Family

Everything suggests he completed his training with Gonzales Coques, a leading painter of portraits and history paintings who was known by the nickname 'de kleine van Dyck' ('the little van Dyck'). Thijs continued working in Coques' workshop for more than three years after becoming a master of the Antwerp Guild of St. Luke in 1644–45. Thanks to the presence of the collection of George Villiers, 1st Duke of Buckingham, in Antwerp, Thijs was able to study the paintings of the Cinquecento.

After leaving Coques' workshop Thijs started out on a career that was successful despite the prevailing dire economic situation in Antwerp. He maintained a busy workshop that employed about twenty apprentices in the course of his career. In the 1660s he had enough work to keep six assistants busy. He obtained many commissions for altarpieces in churches in the Habsburg Netherlands as well as for portraits, and allegorical and mythological paintings from patrons in both the Habsburg Netherlands and the Dutch Republic. Through the international business connections of his father-in-law who ran a large import-export business in Antwerp with offices in the major ports and cities of Europe, he was able to sell his paintings to an international clientele and get commissions for altarpieces in Vienna and Croatia as well as for the Cologne Cathedral. He was able to secure the patronage of prominent Antwerp figures such as the members of the Roose family, whose head was Pierre Roose, Chief President of the Privy Council of the Habsburg Netherlands. The painter produced more than 20 works for them, including portraits, religious paintings and secular works.

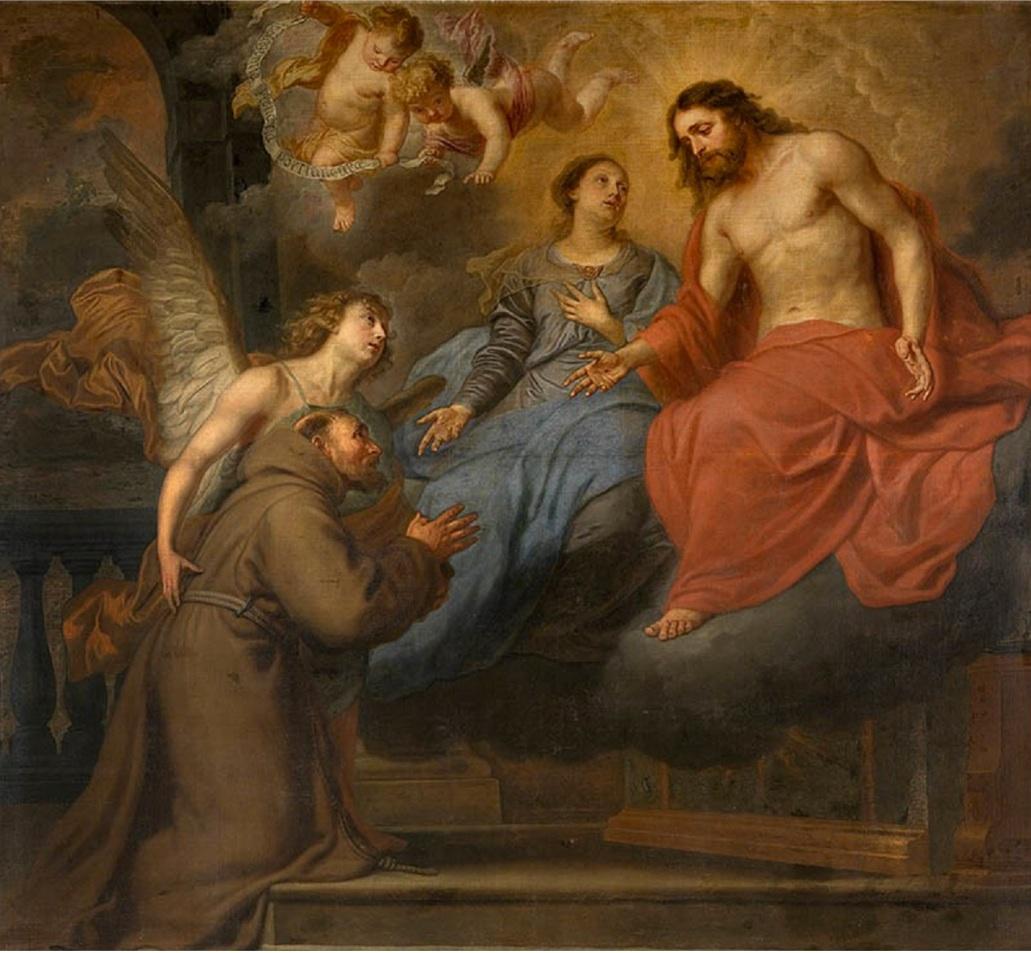
Portiuncula

Thijs enjoyed royal patronage. From 1647 onwards, he became a portrait painter as well as a tapestry designer for Archduke Leopold Wilhelm of Austria, then the Governor of the Southern Netherlands, while at the same time taking on commissions from the rival House of Orange in The Hague. He collaborated on the decorations in Huis Honselaarsdijk, the palace of Frederick Henry, Prince of Orange near The Hague (now lost).

Thijs married Constantia van der Beken on 19 March 1648. The couple had six daughters and four sons. His son Pieter Pauwel Thijs (1652–1679) followed in his footsteps as an artist but died young. After the death of his first wife he married Anna Bruydegom on 2 July 1670.

Thijs played a major role in Antwerp's cultural life. He served as deacon and treasurer of the Antwerp Guild of Saint Luke and was the driving force behind the further development of the Chamber of rhetoric Violieren of the Guild. He was able to persuade the local playwright Willem Ogier to compose several works for the theater.

Thijs trained his son Pieter Pauwel and was the teacher of Jan Fransicus Lauwereyssens.

== Work ==
=== General ===
Pieter Thijs produced allegorical and mythological compositions for the courts of the Southern Netherlands and the Dutch Republic as well as the local churches and monasteries. He was also in demand as a portrait painter by the court and the local bourgeoisie.

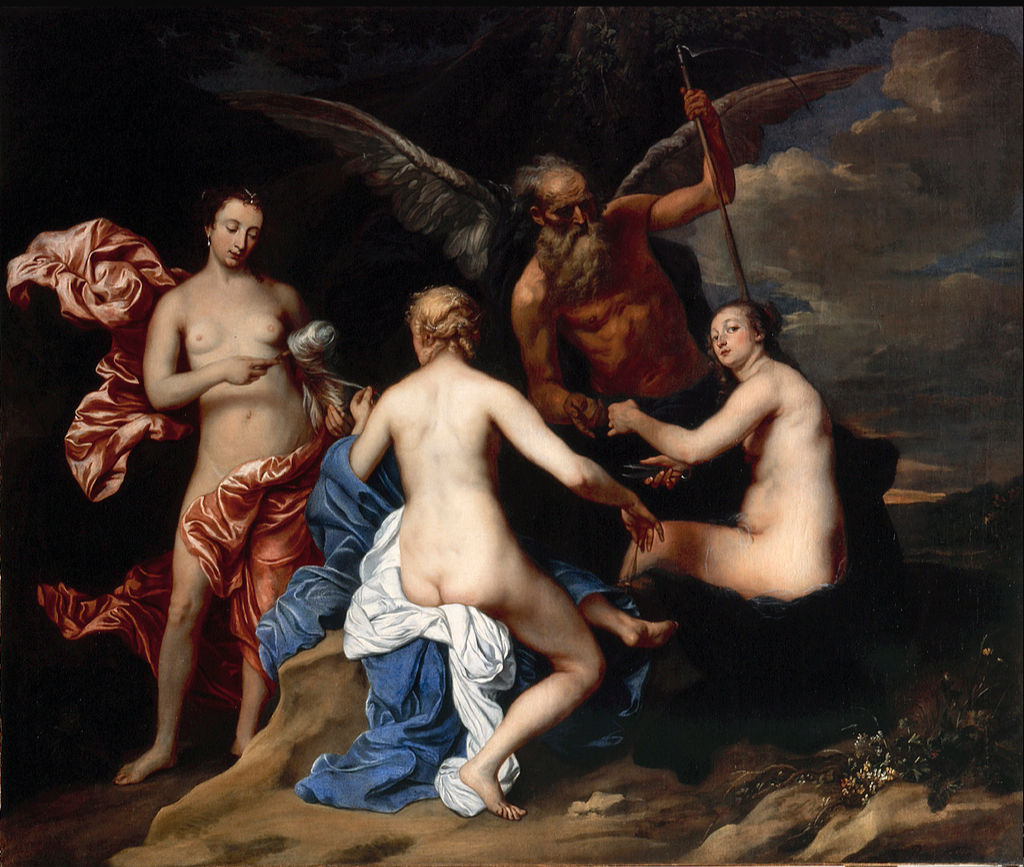
Time and the Three Fates

In the past his reputation suffered because of misattributions of his work. As his style was close to that of van Dyck and the followers of van Dyck, Thijs works have often been attributed to van Dyck and artists working in the van Dyckian idiom such as Thomas Willeboirts Bosschaert, Jan Boeckhorst and Erasmus Quellinus the Younger. With the rediscovery of the artist, works have been re-attributed to Pieter Thijs. As the styles of Thomas Willeboirts Bosschaert and Thijs are very close, there are still disagreements about the attributions of some works to either artist. The main distinguishing features between the styles of the two artists is that Willeboirts Bosschaerts' work uses a looser brushwork and displays a distinctive humanity and sensuality in the figures, especially the female figures. Thijs, on the other hand, applied the paint more tightly and thickly, and his figures express their emotions with more decorum and contained theatricality.

The influence of van Dyck on Thijs' style is due to his direct working relationship with van Dyck. Other possible influences are the works of slightly senior painters such as Thomas Willeboirts Bosschaert and Gonzales Coques who were both early followers of van Dyck as well as Thijs' predecessors at the courts of Brussels and The Hague. The patrons at these courts showed a preference for van Dyck's refined courtly style.

He showed himself to be an eclectic painter who did not strive for originality but adapted and borrowed from the styles of other artists where he felt the commission demanded it.

=== Portraits ===
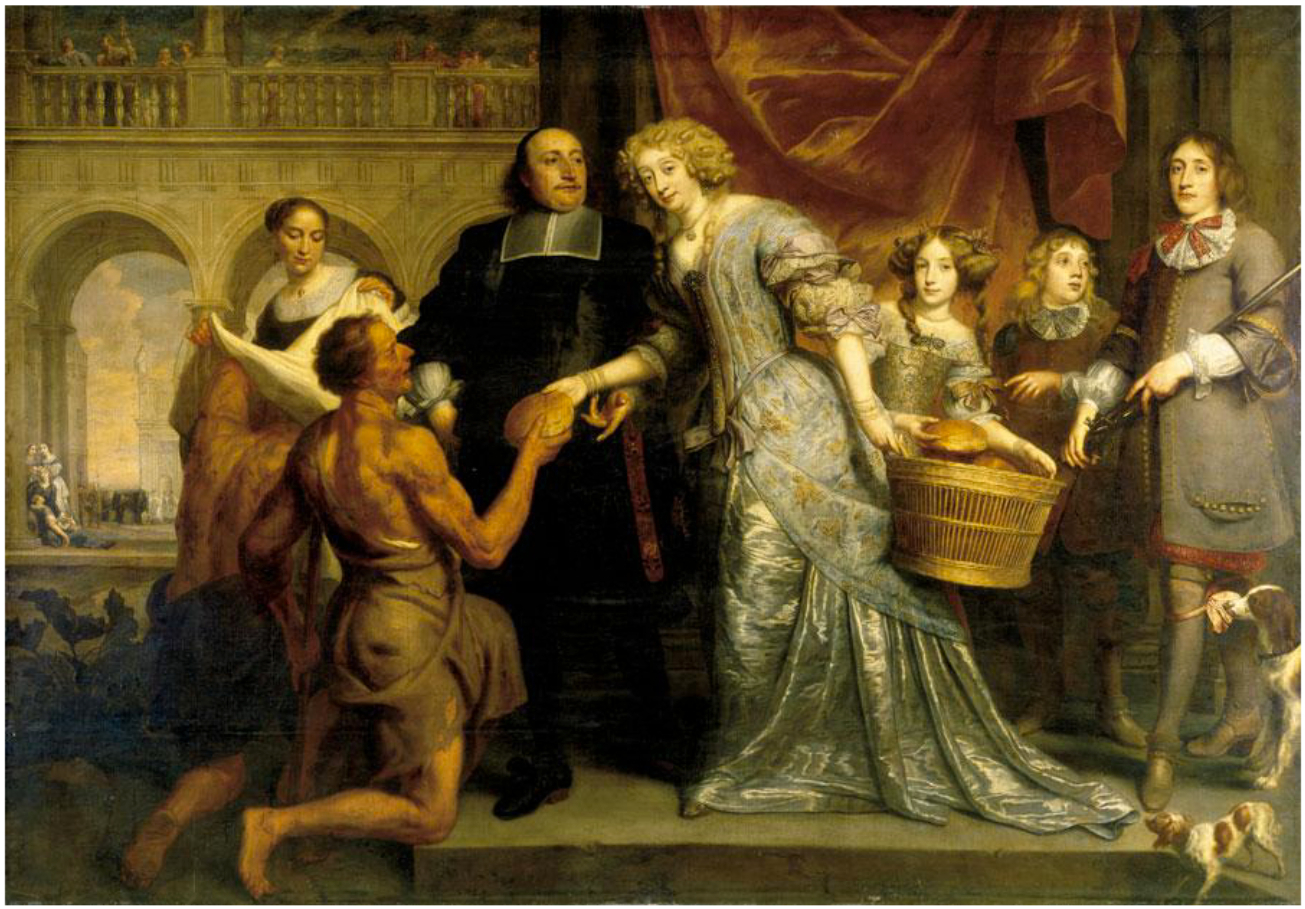
Portrait of an almoner with his wife and children as an allegory of charity

Pieter Thijs was in demand as a portrait painter. He gained in particular a reputation for large family portraits, a genre made popular by his teacher Anthony van Dyck.

His portraits followed the style of van Dyck in the eloquence of the hands and the meticulous execution of the reflections on the shimmering fabric. Though a popular portrait painter, the early Flemish biographer Cornelis de Bie stated that his likenesses were criticized for not being like their subjects.

A representative portrait painting by Thijs is the Portrait of Philips van de Werve and His Wife (c. 1661, Auctioned at Sotheby's on 7 July 2005, London, lot 10). Its composition recalls van Dyck's large family-group portraits painted in his late English period, which Thijs would have seen when he was a pupil of van Dyck. The figures in the group portrait also closely adhere to the van Dyckian type, especially the two children.

=== Religious works ===
His religious works were also influenced by the style of van Dyck. His paintings on the subject of the Descent from the Cross follow the composition and palette of Rubens who had produced some influential paintings on this theme.

Sacrifice of Isaac

His history paintings also show the influence of French classicism, which was then coming into fashion. In these works he paid particular attention to prettiness and a polished finishing. He also borrowed from the Italian masters of the Cinquecento, such as Titian and Veronese.

In this mature period from the 1660s onwards, Pieter Thijs usually relied on pyramidal, symmetrical compositions and he painted his female figures draped in tunics tied at the waist and wearing garments with folds in V-form.

=== Collaborations ===
As was common in 17th-century Antwerp, he often collaborated with other artists who were specialist painters. He added the figures to the compositions of various Antwerp animal specialists. Examples are the Huntsman with His Dogs and Game (Cummer Museum of Art and Gardens) in collaboration with Pieter Boel and the Atalanta and Meleager Hunt the Calydonian Boar (John and Mable Ringling Museum of Art) in collaboration with Jan Fyt. Pieter Boel probably also painted the still life and parrot in Thijs' Portrait of Philips van de Werve and His Wife.

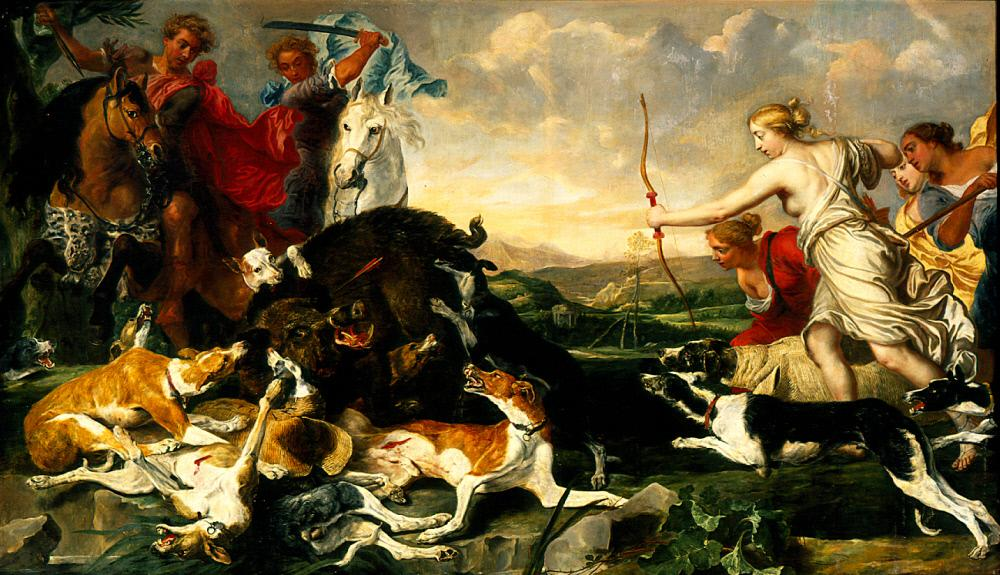
Atalanta and Meleager Hunt the Calydonian Boar

Thijs collaborated with flower painters on so-called 'garland paintings'. Garland paintings are a type of still life invented in Antwerp and whose earliest practitioner was Jan Brueghel the Elder. These paintings typically show a flower garland around a devotional image or portrait. Garland paintings were usually collaborations between a still life and a figure painter. An example is the composition Leopold of Austria in flower garland (Auctioned at Sotheby's, London on 5 December 2006, lot nr 412) in which the portrait of Archduke Leopold Wilhelm of Austria was painted by Thijs and the flower garland is by an unknown hand.

In the 1650s, Pieter Thijs worked with Thomas Willeboirts Bosschaert, Jan Brueghel the Younger and Adriaen van Utrecht on the cartoons for two series of tapestries for Archduke Leopold Wilhelm, with the titles Day and Night and The Months. The cartoons were painted after designs by Jan van den Hoecke and woven by the Brussels tapestry workshops. Some of the cartoons such as Diana, allegory of the night are in the collection of the Kunsthistorisches Museum.
