= Ryckaert family =

The Flemish Ryckaert or Rijckaert family of Antwerp produced several painters during the late sixteenth and the seventeenth centuries.

- David Ryckaert I (1560–1607). Little is known of his career. Two of his sons by his wife Catherina Rem were professional painters.
- David Ryckaert II (1586–1642); eldest son of David I. He was one of the pioneers of still life painting in Flanders.
- Marten Ryckaert (1587–1631); second son of David I. Anthony van Dyck painted portraits of both brothers, David II and Martin.
- David Ryckaert III (1612–1661); son of David II, grandson of David I, nephew of Martin. He was a prominent genre painter.
