= Marten Ryckaert =

Flemish painter

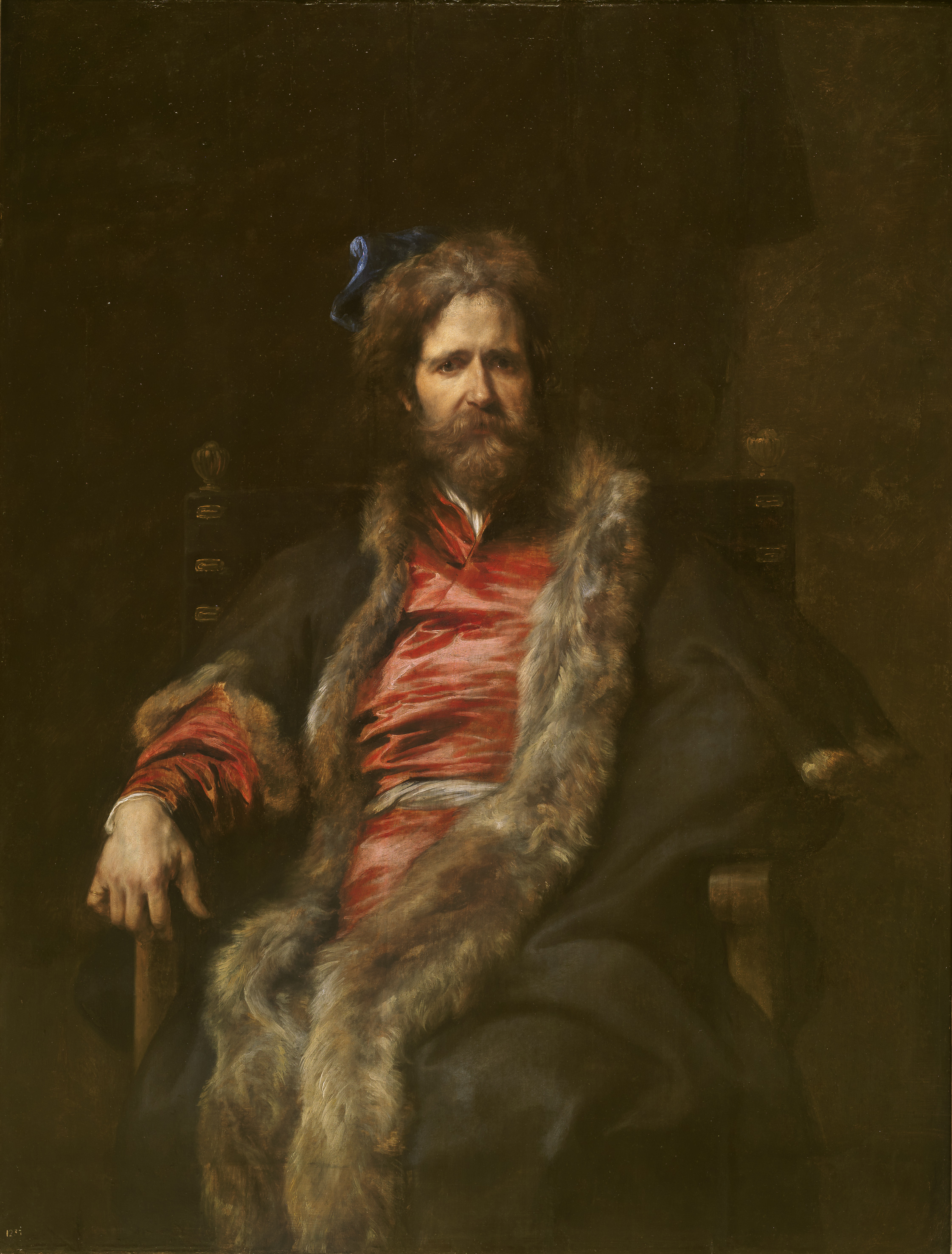
Marten Ryckaert by Anthony van Dyck

Marten Ryckaert or Maerten Ryckaert (baptised 8 December 1587, Antwerp – 11 October 1631), was a Flemish landscape painter. He was known for his small, usually imaginary landscapes in an Italianate style.

== Life ==
Marten Ryckaert was a member of the Ryckaert (or Rijckaert) family of artists. He was born in Antwerp in 1587 as the second child of David Rijckaert the Elder and Catharina Rem. David the Elder was a brewer and a painter of wooden statues who had become a master of the Antwerp Guild of Saint Luke in 1585. He is also mentioned as a dealer in paintings. Marten had 7 siblings of whom his older brother David the Younger (born in 1586) became a prominent still life painter. He was the uncle of David Ryckaert III, a genre painter. As the result of a birth defect or because of an accident, he had only one arm.

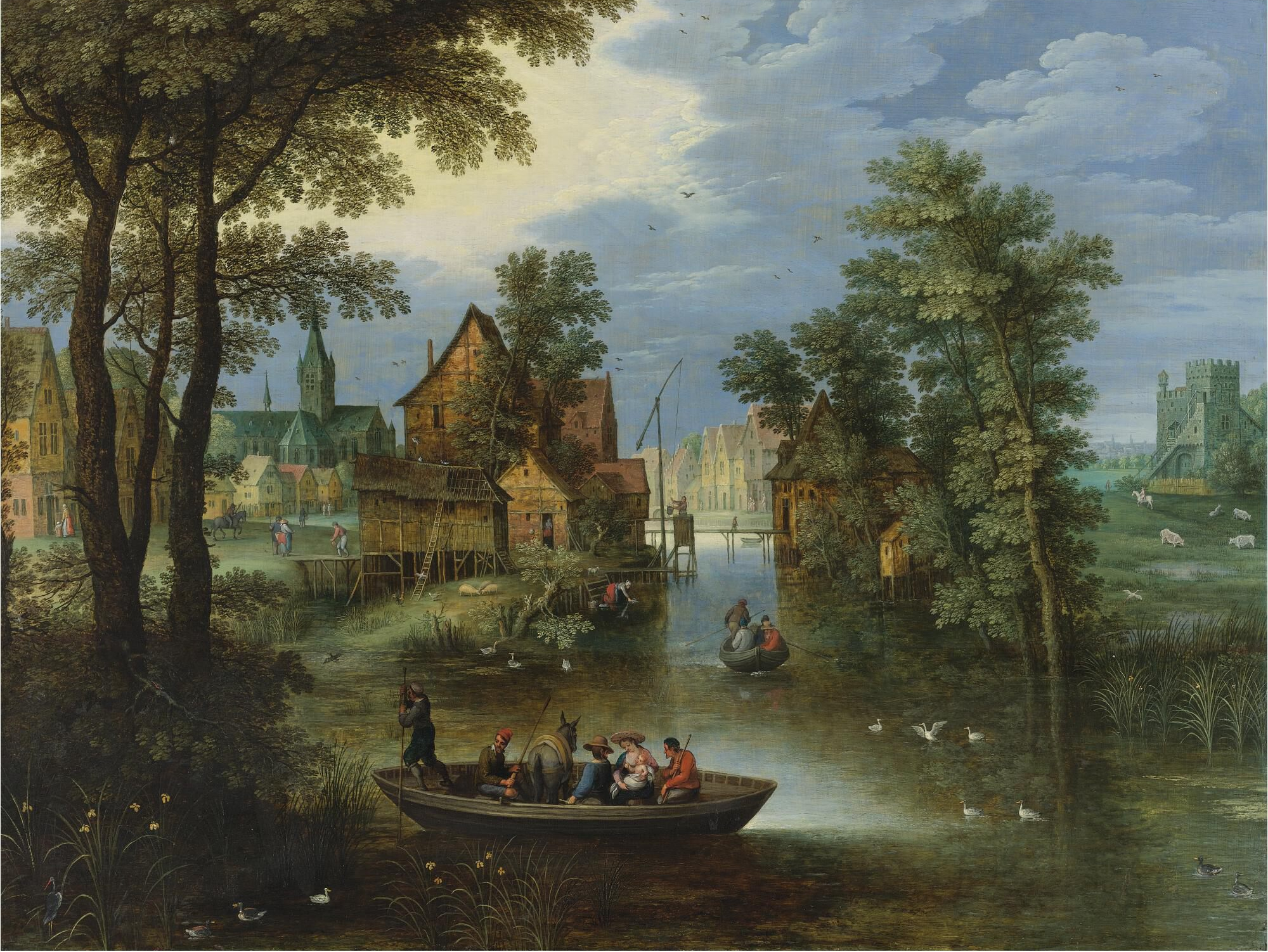
River landscape with the Flight into Egypt

Marten probably first studied with his father and was later a pupil of Tobias Verhaecht (or Verhaeght). Verhaecht was also Peter Paul Rubens's teacher for a brief period. Marten became a member of the Antwerp Guild of St. Luke in 1607.

It is believed he traveled to Italy between 1607 and 1610 although no documentary evidence of this trip has been found. It is believed that during his stay in Italy he practised plein air sketching. Marten rejoined the Antwerp Guild of St. Luke in 1611 and was registered as the "painter with one arm". He spent the remainder of his professional career in his native city. He was active in the local chamber of rhetoric De Violieren. He never married and collected many paintings by his contemporaries in his house in the Meyerstraat in Antwerp.

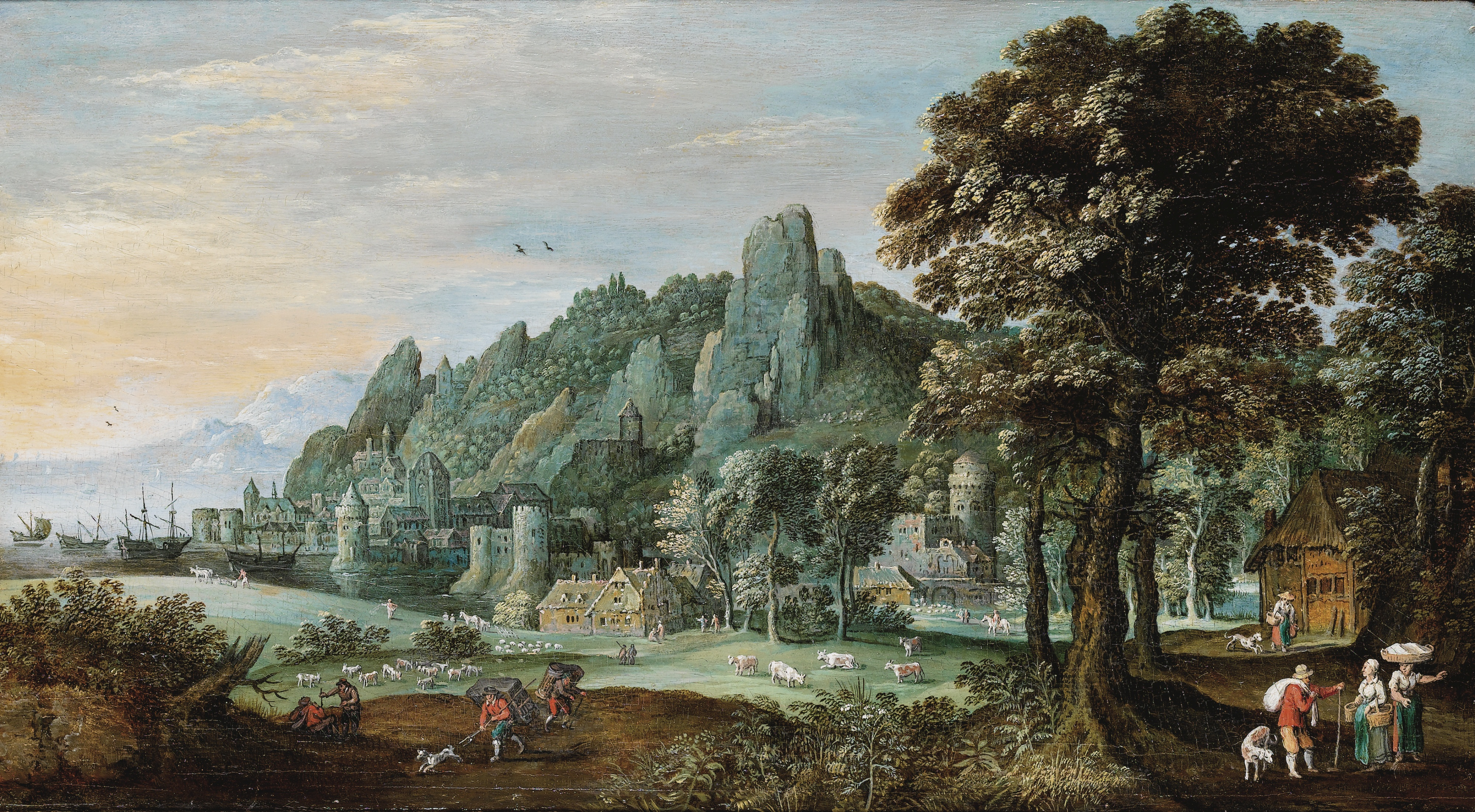
Landscape in the Rhine valley

He was reportedly a close friend of Anthony van Dyck, who painted his portrait showing Ryckaert dressed up as a king around 1630. This portrait was in the possession of Marten Ryckaert when he died and is today in the Prado in Madrid. The portrait was engraved by Jacob Neefs and then included in van Dyck's book project entitled "Iconography" which contained portraits of famous people of that time.

Ryckaert fell ill in early 1631 and is buried in Antwerp on 11 October. He left his entire fortune to his sister Maria and his brother Pauwel (or Pauwels).

== Work ==
His sparse surviving works mainly depict imaginary landscapes with forests, often with waterfalls, rocks, ruins, architecture and small human figures. Marten Ryckaert's work shows similarities with that of the Antwerp painter Joos de Momper and also to that of Paul Bril and Jan Brueghel

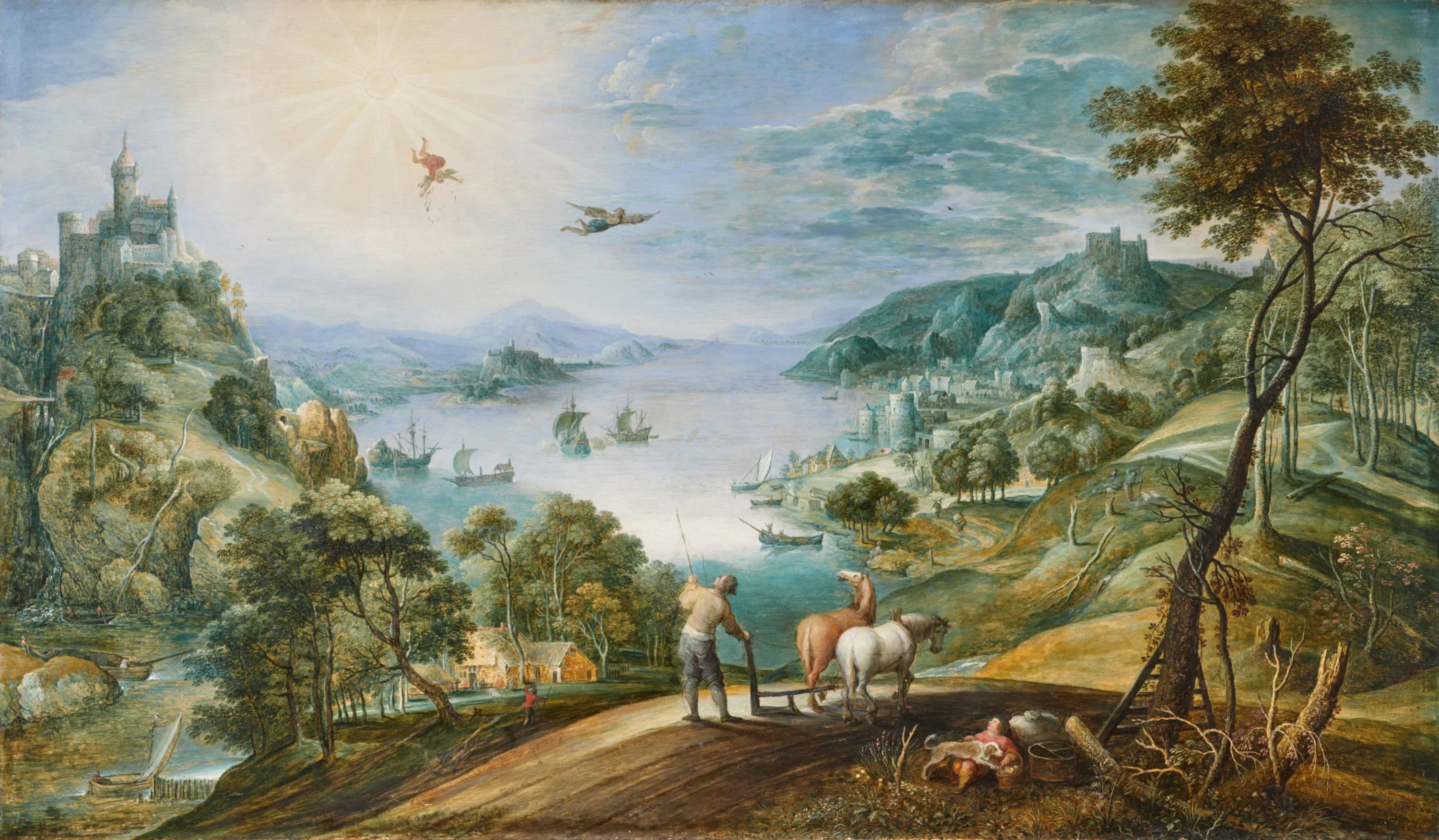
Landscape with a farmer plowing and the fall of Icarus

It is difficult to assess the stylistic development of his work. The landscapes are in an Italianate style and thus resemble those of the Rome-based Flemish landscape painter Paul Bril. This is particularly true for works from the period following his return from his presumed trip to Italy as Paul Bril's prints of Roman-style landscapes were widely disseminated in Antwerp at this time. The placement, style and grouping of the figures in the landscapes are indebted to Jan Brueghel the Elder. This is most obvious in works such as the Landscape with the Flight into Egypt (in a private collection) that is based on a lost original by Brueghel, although Ryckaert did not slavishly copy Brueghel's invention. The colour treatment resembles that of Joos de Momper.

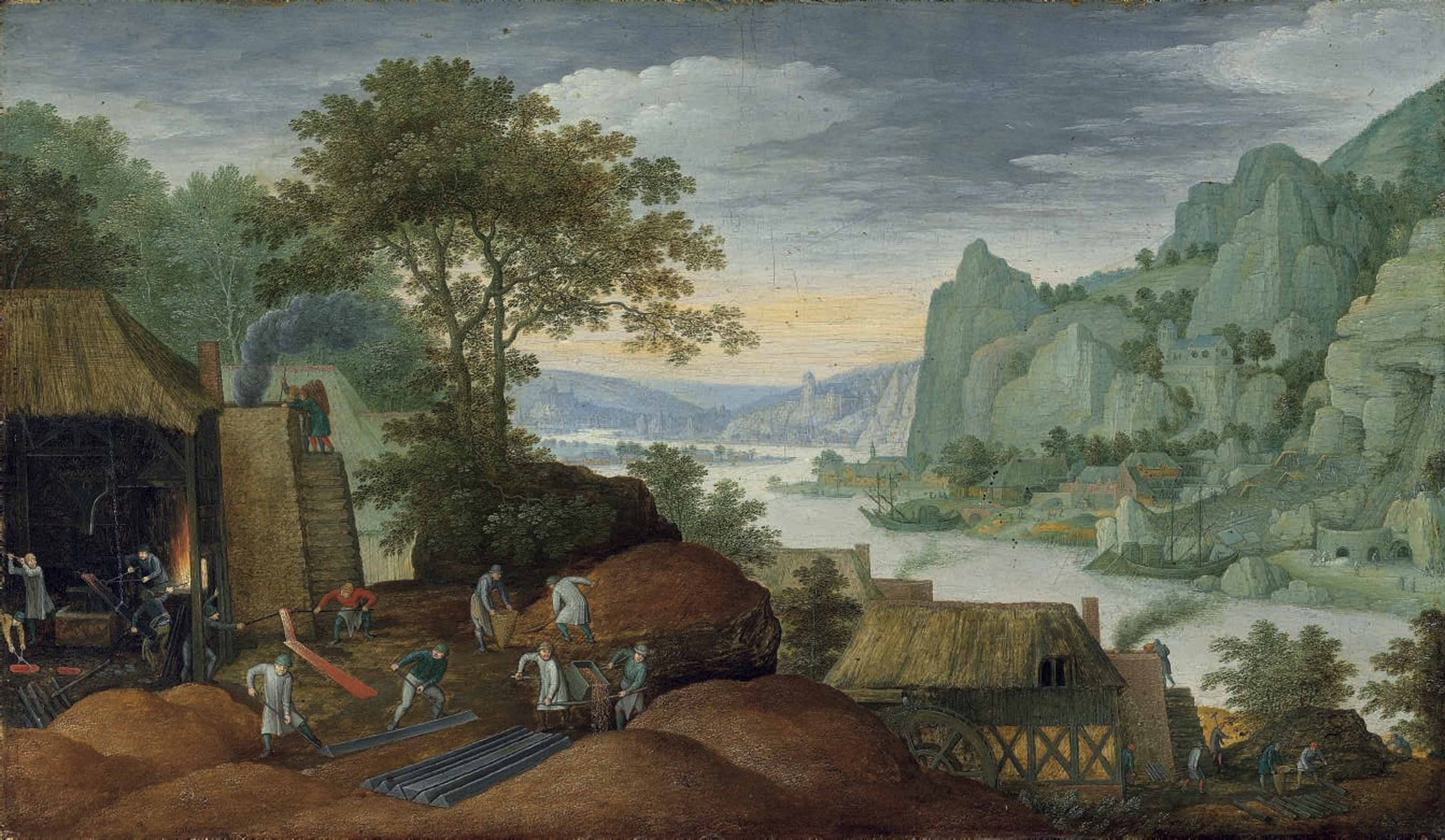
A rocky landscape with figures by an iron foundry

His style of painting became gradually obsolete during his own lifetime and was replaced by the Baroque style, which was characterized by a greater realism, greater scale, warmer colours and transparent light.

His composition A rocky landscape with figures by an iron foundry has long been regarded as one of the oldest paintings of a blast furnace and refinery in Europe.
