= Gonzales Coques =

Flemish painter (c. 1616–1684)

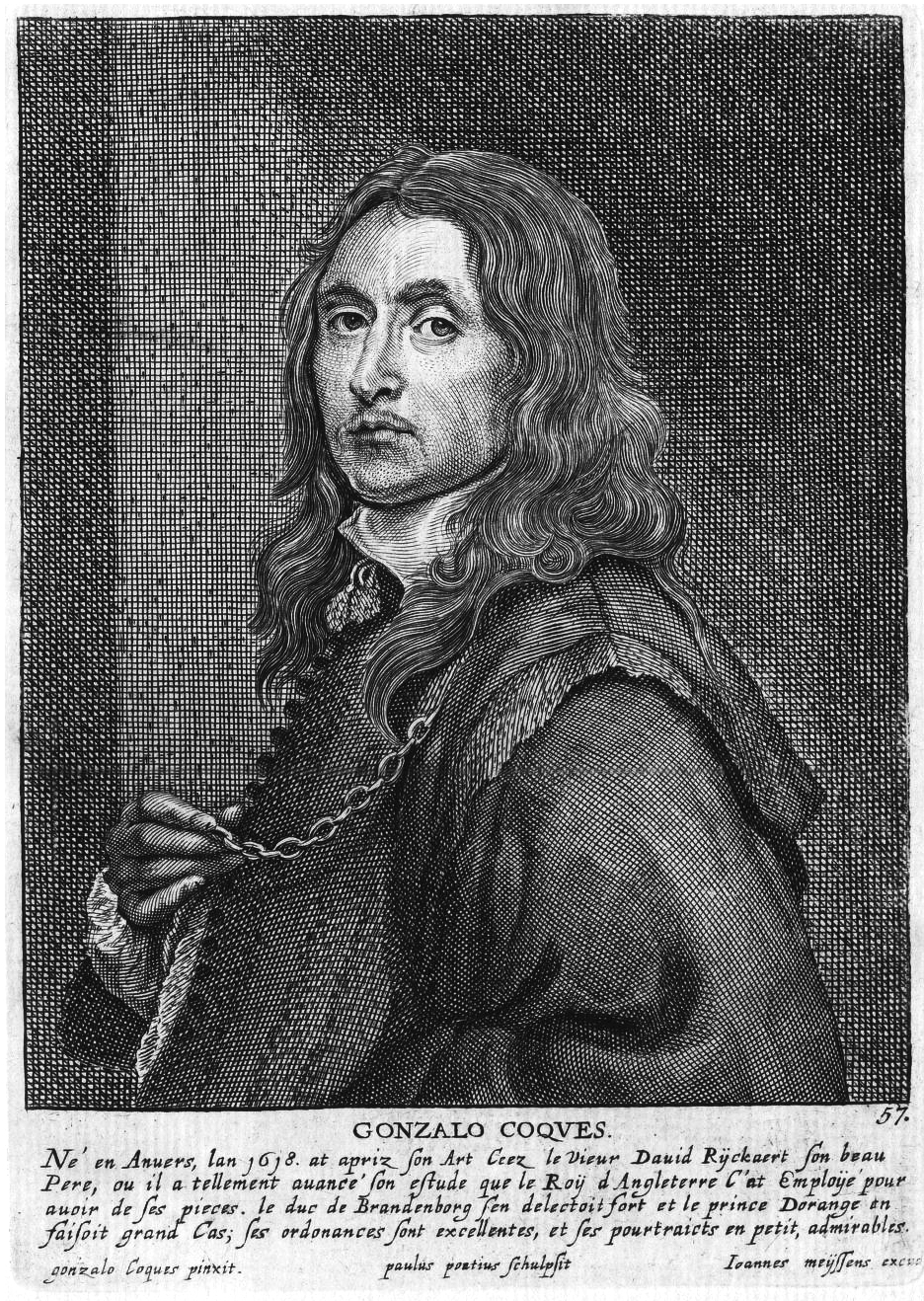
Portrait of Coques engraved by Paulus Pontius after a self-portrait

Gonzales Coques (between 1614 and 1618 – 18 April 1684) was a Flemish painter of portraits and history paintings. Because of his artistic proximity to and emulation with Anthony van Dyck he received the nickname de kleine van Dyck (the little van Dyck). Coques was also active as an art dealer.

== Life ==
Coques was born in Antwerp as the son of Pieter Willemsen Cock and Anne Beys. His exact date of birth is not known. Estimates range between c. 8 December 1614, the date on which a Gonzala Coques was baptized in the Antwerp Church of St. George (possibly an elder sister although female 'a' endings of first names of boys did occur in 17th century Antwerp) and 1618, the date under the engraved portrait in biographer Cornelis de Bie's book Het Gulden Cabinet of 1661. The later date is less likely since Coques commenced his apprenticeship in 1626 which would be a more likely date for a 12-year-old than an 8-year-old.

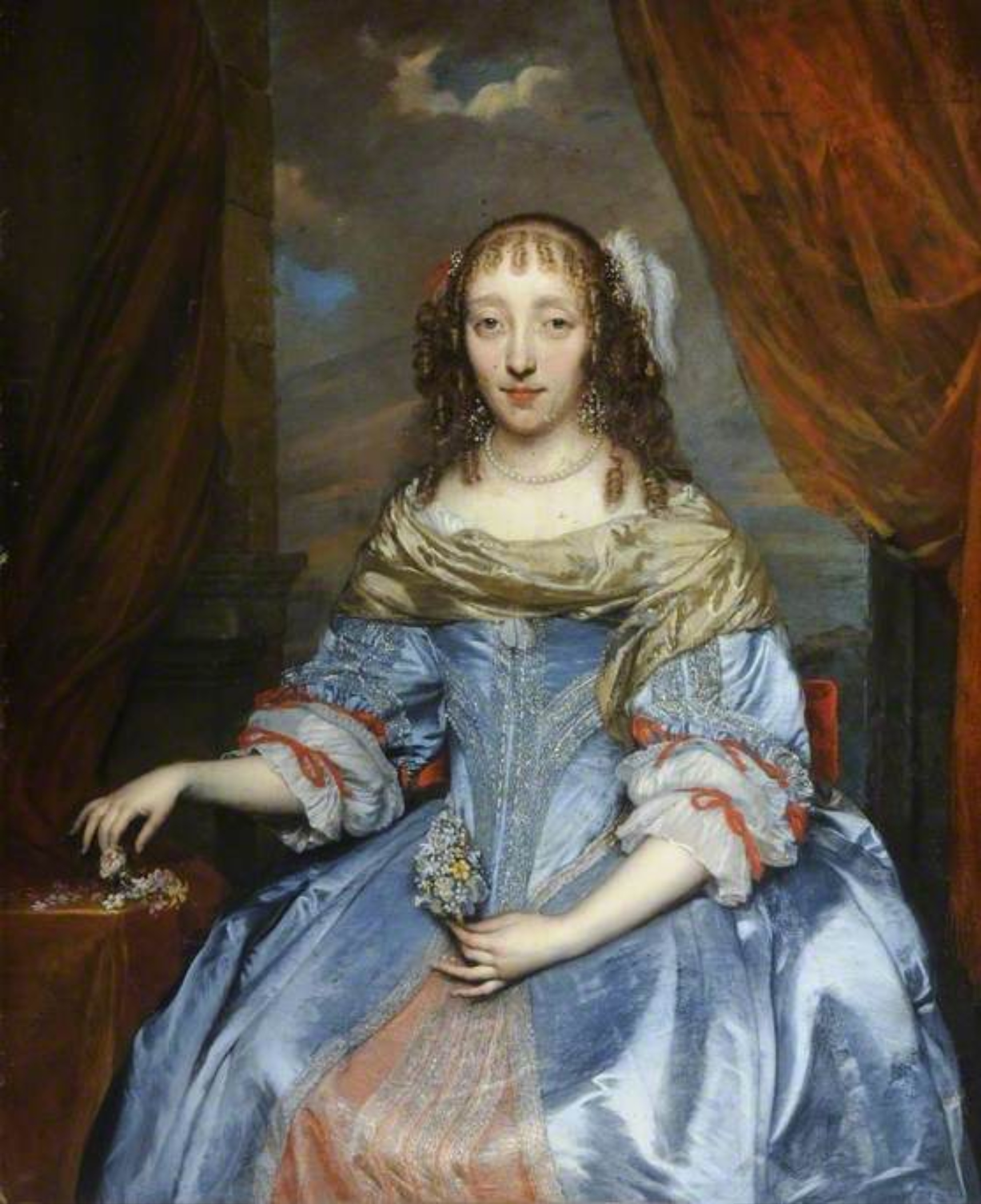
Lady in a Blue Satin Dress

Gonzales Coques was first registered in 1626–1627 at the Antwerp Guild of Saint Luke as a pupil of Pieter Brueghel the Younger or his son Pieter Brueghel III. David Rijckaert (it is not clear whether David Ryckaert I or his son David Rijckaert II is meant) is named as his teacher under a portrait engraved by Paulus Pontius after a self-portrait by Coques, which was included in Joannes Meyssens' publication Images de divers hommes d'esprit sublime of 1649 and later re-used in Cornelis de Bie's book Het Gulden Cabinet of 1661. Coques became a master in the Guild of Saint Luke in the Guild year 1640–1641. He married on 11 August 1643 with Catharina Ryckaert (died on 2 July 1674) who was the daughter of David Rijckaert II, his presumed master. The prominent Antwerp painter David Ryckaert III was therefore his brother-in-law. Their daughter Catharina Gonzaline was (already) born on 5 January 1644. A second daughter was born from this marriage.

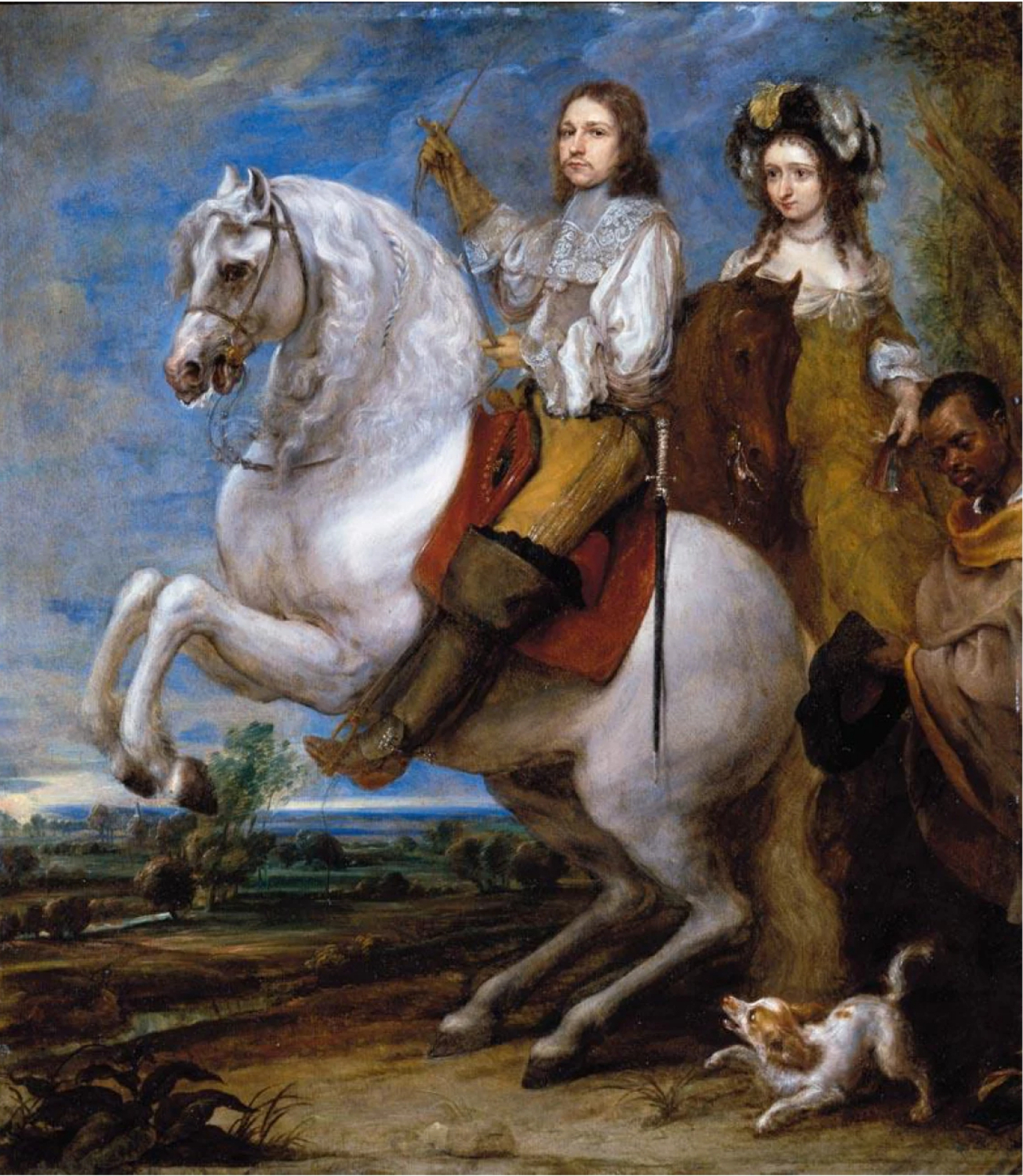
Equestrian portrait of a couple

It is inferred from stylistic analysis that Coques likely worked for van Dyck. The first period of collaboration probably took place between 1629 and 1632, i.e. after van Dyck's return to Flanders and his departure for England. The second period was during the years 1634-1635 when van Dyck was back in Antwerp. Coques' intimate knowledge of some of van Dyck's later English compositions points to a possible stay of Coques in England during van Dyck's final residence in England. This would also explain why Joannes Meyssens' engraved portrait mentions that Coques had worked for Charles I of England. He also worked for Charles I's two sons, Henry Stuart, Duke of Gloucester and Charles II during their exile in Bruges in the years 1656–1657.

Such overseas travel would also offer an explanation for the long lapse between the time on which Coques commenced his apprenticeship (1620) and the date on which he became a master in the Guild (1640).

Coques was a member of two rhetorician guilds in Antwerp. He served twice as the deacon of the Guild of Saint Luke. In 1671 he became court painter to Juan Dominico de Zúñiga y Fonseca, the governor of the Southern Netherlands who resided in Brussels.

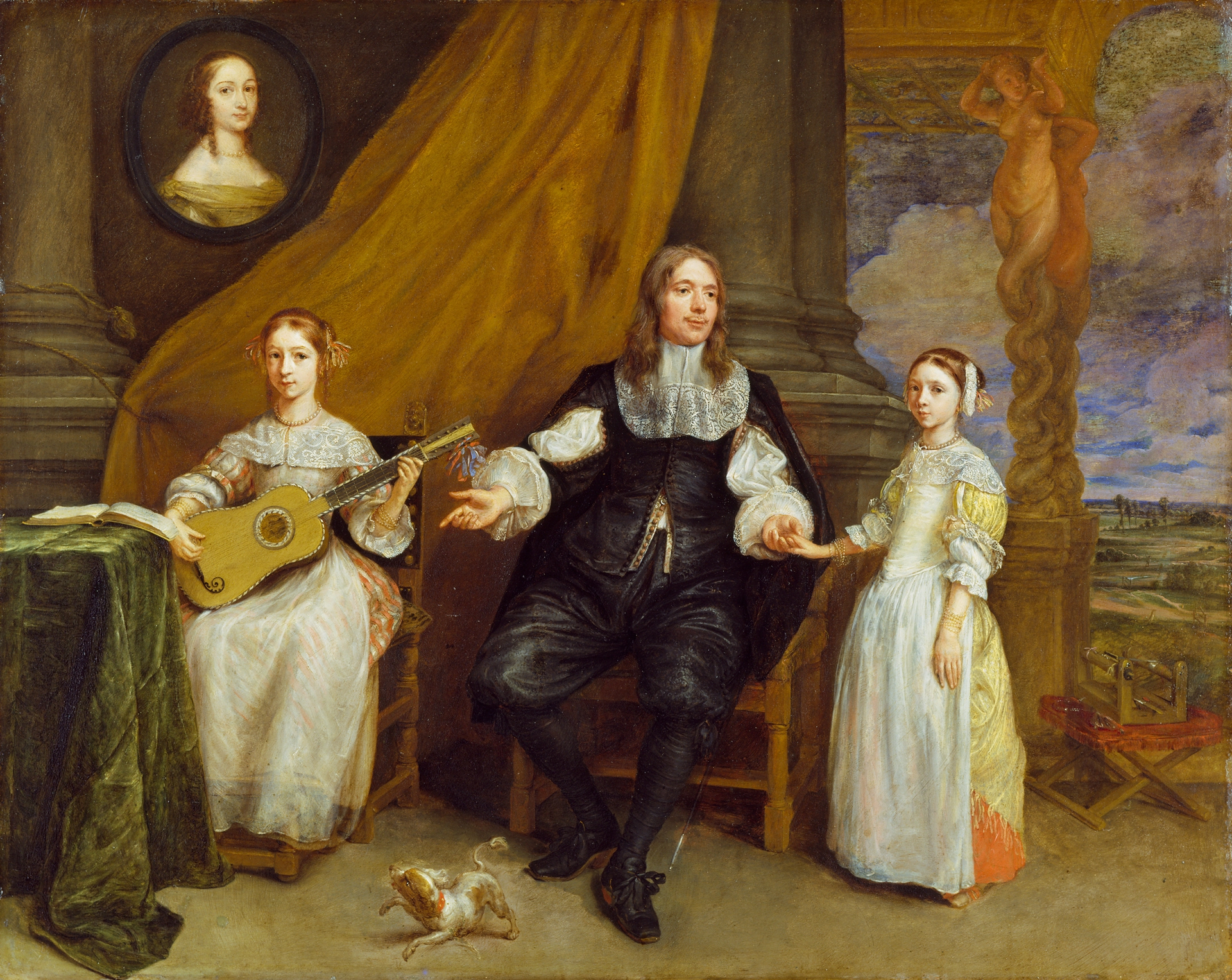
A gentleman with his two daughters

After the death of his first wife, Coques married Catharina Rysheuvels on 21 March 1675 (she died on 25 November 1684. The couple had no children.

Coques worked for Antwerp's wealthy bourgeoisie as well as for aristocratic patrons such as governor Juan Dominico de Zuniga y Fonseca, John of Austria the Younger, Frederick William, Elector of Brandenburg and Frederick Henry, Prince of Orange. Coques enjoyed the patronage of the Dutch court in The Hague possibly because his paintings in the style of van Dyck and featuring scenes with shepherds and shepherdesses appealed to the courtly tastes of the time.

Very little is known about Coques' workshop practices. The registers of the Guild of Saint Luke record two apprentices: Cornelis van den Bosch (in 1643/44) and Lenardus-Franciscus Verdussen (in 1665/66), artists about whom nothing else is known.

He died in Antwerp on 18 April 1684 and was buried on the same day.

== Work ==
=== General ===
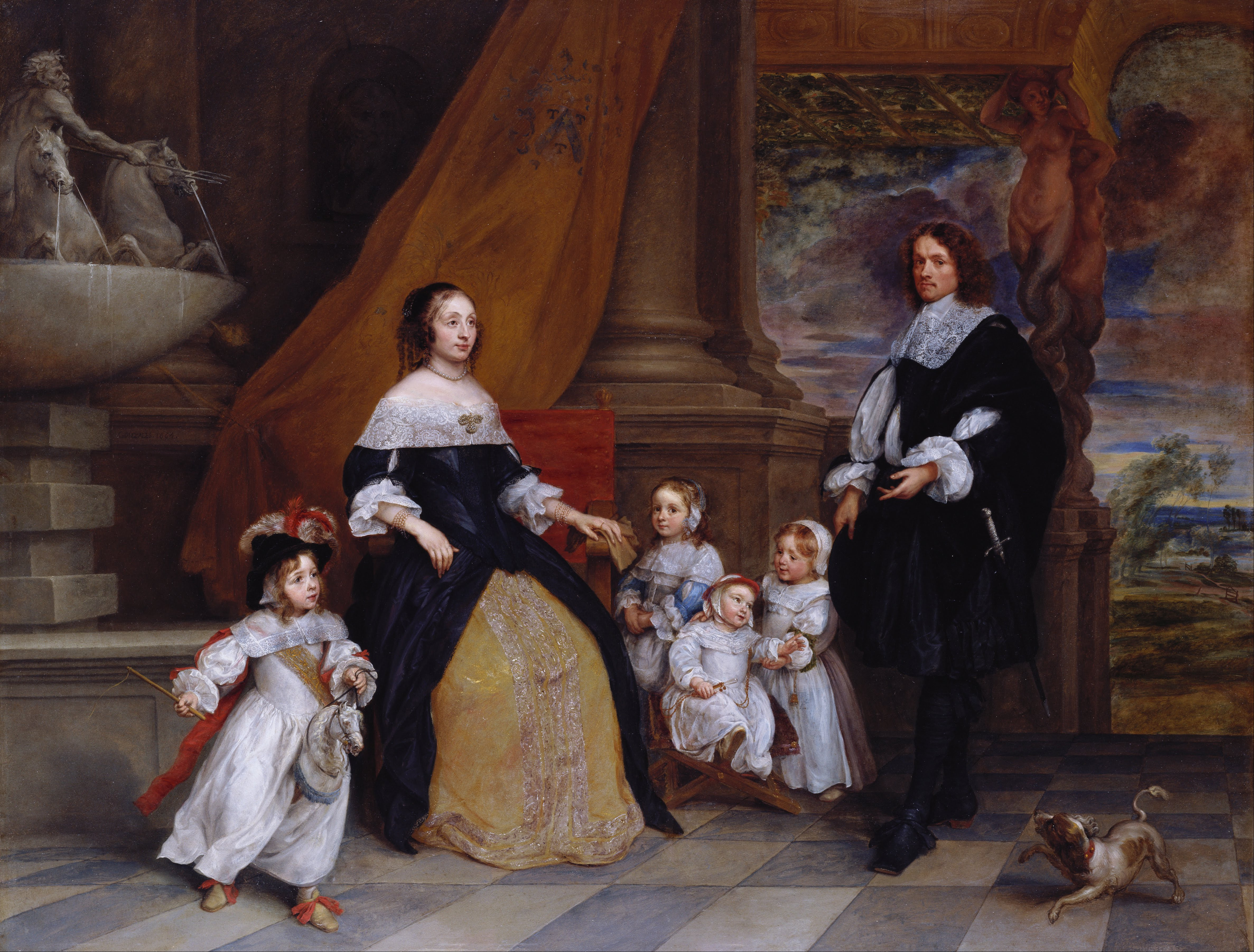
Family of Jan-Baptista Anthoine

Gonzales Coques is primarily known as a painter of individual and family portraits, which he typically executed on a smaller scale than was common at the time. Although these small cabinet paintings have been referred to as conversation pieces, a type of elegant, informal group portrait that he is credited with inventing, recent scholarship has emphasised that his group portraits should be seen as narrative portraits rather than genre portraits, conversation pieces or merry companies.

Despite his preference for smaller-scale cabinet paintings, Coques is reported to have made large-format portraits and history paintings (in collaboration with other painters) for the court at The Hague, the current whereabouts of which are not known. Finally, Coques collaborated in and organized the execution of so-called 'pictures of galleries'.

=== Portraits ===
Coques is mainly known for his portraits, and in particular, his group portraits. His work shows the influence of the great Antwerp masters such as Rubens. However, the most important influence on his work was van Dyck. Some of Coques' works can in fact be regarded as the transposition of van Dyck compositions to smaller scale cabinet pieces. It can be said that he provided to well-off bourgeoisie what van Dyck was providing to his aristocratic patron. In that role he replaced from the 1640s the other leading 17th century portrait painter to the bourgeoisie in Antwerp, Cornelis de Vos, who concentrated from that time onwards more on his history paintings.

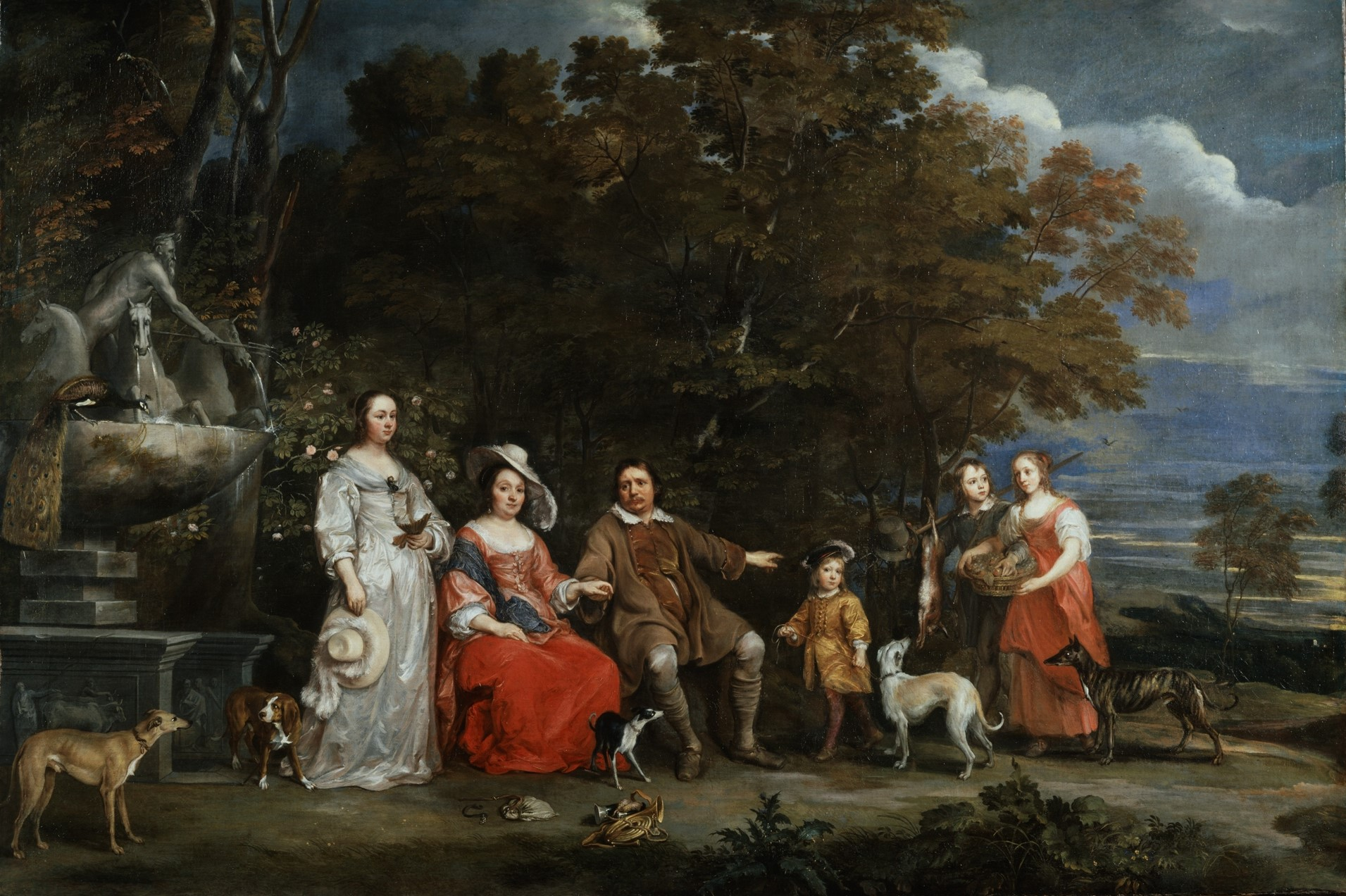
A family group in a landscape

He is credited with introducing a new kind of portrait genre in Flanders: small-scale group portraits in which the subjects are depicted going about their everyday activities in their houses or gardens. These portraits were narrative in nature rather than genre pieces. From his early tentative compositions he developed later the ability to put together well-organized and complex scenes. The portraits had their roots in aristocratic portraiture and aimed to stress the status and privilege of the sitters. To this end the sitters were depicted in scenes that emphasized the spiritual and material achievements of the sitters such as musical performances, outdoor meals, quiet strolls and hunting scenes. He integrated Venetian motifs such as classical architecture and drapery in the compositions, as had been pioneered by van Dyck.

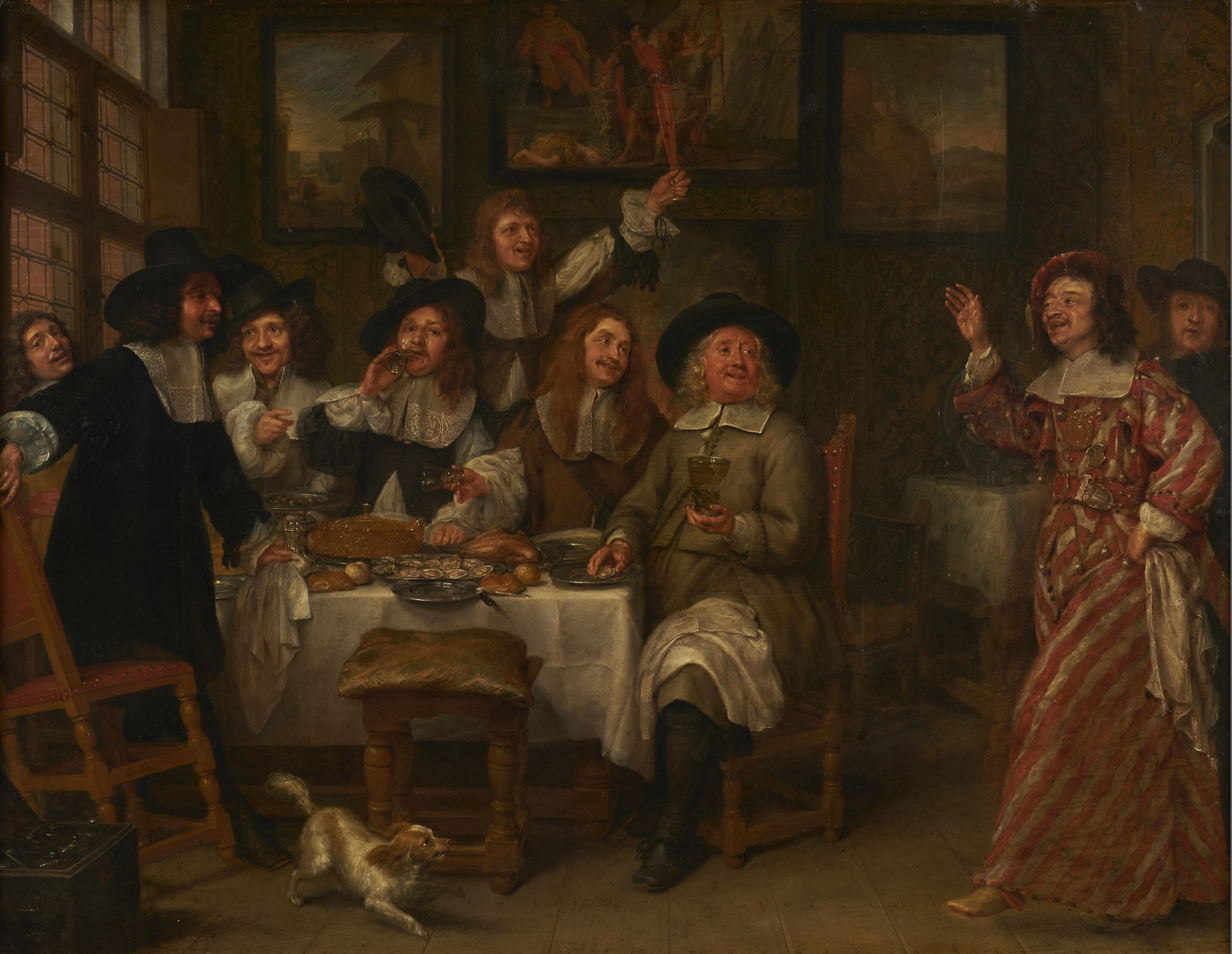
Dinner of artists

His family portraits are never stereotypes although his clients may have been able to choose from models. This explains that identical poses appear in a series of diverse pictures. Still each background is different. A good example of a family portrait is the composition A family group in a landscape (Wallace Collection). It shows the father of the family decorously holding his wife's hand while pointing with his other hand to his sons returning from the hunt. The image conveys the privileged position of the family members since hunting had been until shortly before the date of the painting the exclusive privilege of the nobility. A daughter accompanies the boys. The basket of fruit she carries may be a representation of the hope for a fruitful marriage. The well-tended garden is decorated with statuary and fountains and is a testimony to the sitters' status and wealth. The family hierarchy is clearly staged, but the setting remains informal because of the presence of children and pets. The background in this painting may have been painted by another hand.

=== Allegorical portraits ===
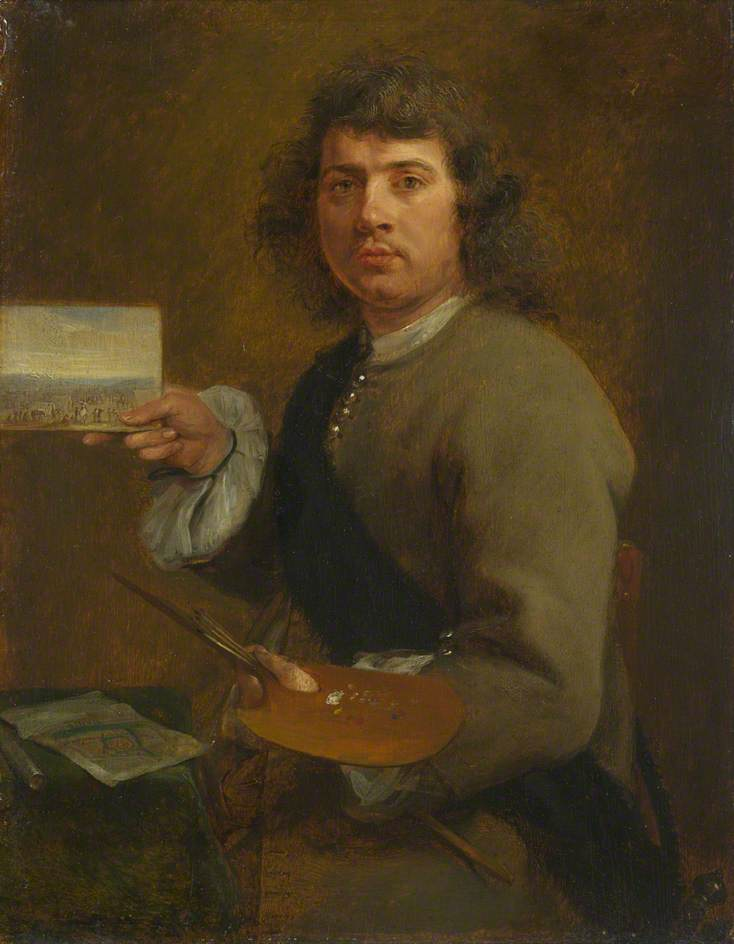
Sight (Portrait of Robert van den Hoecke)

Coques painted a few series of allegorical portraits depicting the five senses. The sitters for the portraits were fellow Antwerp artists. The set in the Royal Museum of Fine Arts Antwerp has the following portraits: Sight (Artus Quellinus the Elder), Hearing (Jan Philip van Thielen), Smell (Lucas Faydherbe), Touch (Pieter Meert) and Taste (possibly a self-portrait). Coques produced various series on the same subject. There are complete sets in the Brukenthal National Museum in Sibiu, Romania and the National Gallery in London.

Each of the sitters is depicted engaging in an action which represents the particular sense after which the picture is named. For instance, in the portrait depicting 'Sight' (National Gallery London) the painter Robert van den Hoecke is shown with a palette and brushes in one hand while he holds a completed landscape painting in the other hand. Robert van den Hoecke was a painter who also served as the 'Contrôleur des fortifications' in Flanders and the plan, baldric (belt hung over the shoulder) and sword refer to this office.

=== Gallery paintings ===
Gonzales Coques worked also in the genre of the 'gallery paintings'. The 'gallery paintings' genre is native to Antwerp where Frans Francken the Younger and Jan Brueghel the Elder were the first artists to create paintings of art and curiosity collections in the 1620s. Gallery paintings depict large rooms in which many paintings and other precious items are displayed in elegant surroundings.

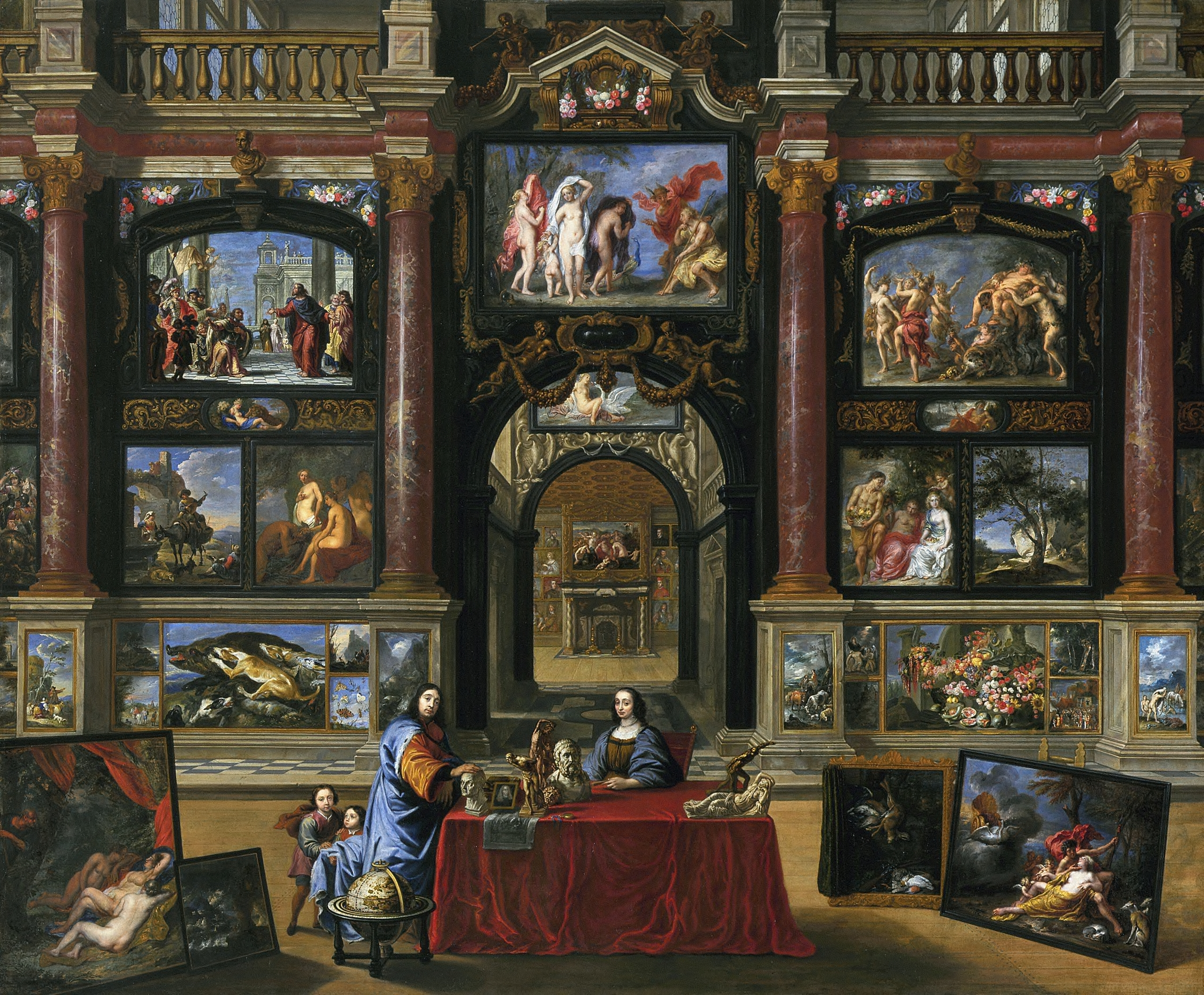
Interior with figures in a picture gallery

The earliest works in this genre depicted art objects together with other items such as scientific instruments or peculiar natural specimens. The genre became immediately quite popular and was followed by other artists such as Jan Brueghel the Younger, Cornelis de Baellieur, Hans Jordaens, David Teniers the Younger, Gillis van Tilborch, Wilhelm Schubert van Ehrenberg and Hieronymus Janssens. The art galleries depicted were either real galleries or imaginary galleries, sometimes with allegorical figures. Coques played a major role in the genre in the second half of the 17th century and is known to have supervised the execution of this type of composition which usually involved the collaboration of multiple artists.

An example of van Coques' work in this genre is the Interior with Figures in a Picture Gallery (Mauritshuis, The Hague). This was likely a collaboration with Dirck van Delen who painted the architectural setting. It was believed earlier that it was Wilhelm Schubert van Ehrenberg who painted the architectural setting. The composition depicts a large gallery with many pictures on the walls and standing on the floor. A man and woman are sitting at a table on which are placed various sculptures and two children stand next to them. Possibly the picture depicts the Antwerp collector Antoon van Leyden (1626–1686), his wife Marie-An van Eywerven and their two daughters. The couple appear in the process of appreciating and discussing some of the artworks in the gallery. This gallery painting represents a later development in the genre initiated by David Teniers the Younger, which excludes non-art objects from the gallery. The figures in the gallery painting are portrayed as forming part of an elite who possess privileged knowledge of art. The genre of gallery paintings had by that time become a medium to accentuate the notion that the powers of discernment associated with connoisseurship are socially superior to or more desirable than other forms of knowing. The pictures depicted in the room appear to represent works of leading Antwerp painters. The presence of children in this type of composition has been explained by the popularity in the Netherlands during the 1660s and 70s of genre scenes showing domestic interiors and 'ordinary' people.

=== Collaborations ===
Coques regularly collaborated with specialist artists. Collaborations are recorded or attributed with Frans Francken the Younger, landscape painters Frans Wouters, Gaspar de Witte and Jacques d'Arthois, marine painters such as Jan Peeters I and architecture painters such as Pieter Neefs the Elder and the Younger) and Dirck van Delen.

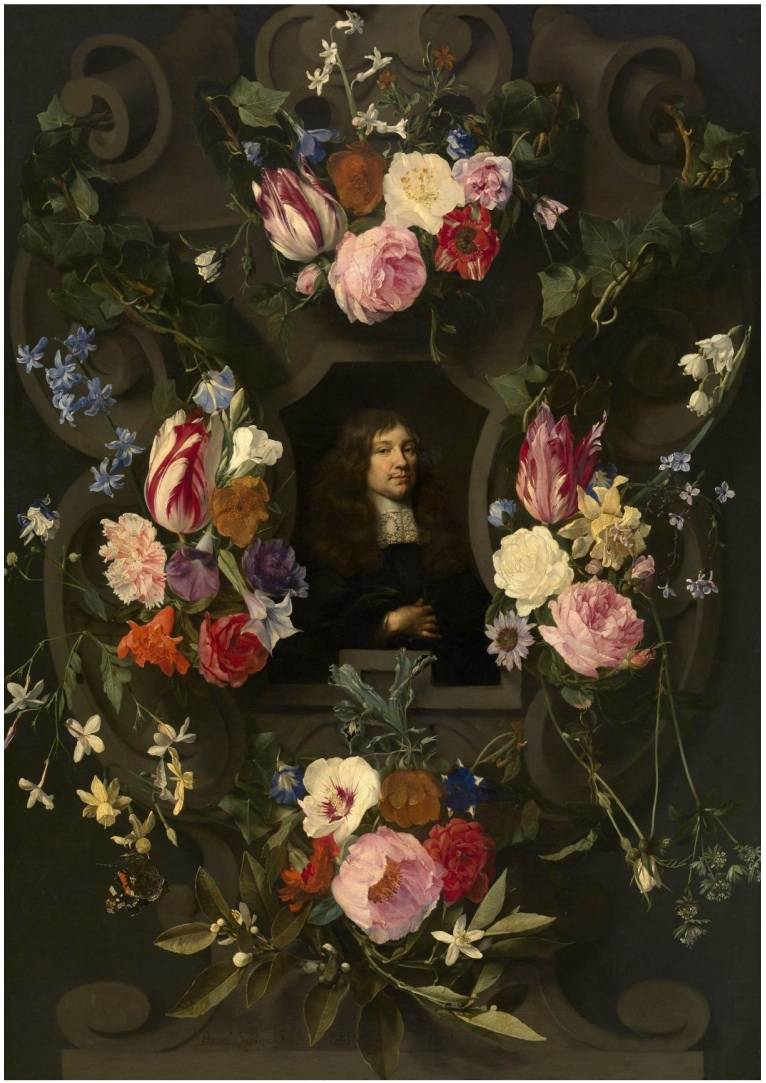
Portrait of a man in a garland, with Daniël Seghers

When in 1649 Coques was commissioned with the decoration of the Oranjezaal in the Huis ten Bosch, the country house in The Hague of the stadholder's widow, Amalia von Solms, he organized for his fellow townsmen such as Pieter Thijs, Justus Danneels and Pieter de Witte II to execute the commission.

Coques occasionally worked on garland paintings in which he painted the staffage and the flower or fruit garland was painted by other artists. Garland paintings typically show a flower or fruit garland around a devotional image, portrait or other religious symbol (such as the host). Garland paintings were developed in Antwerp in the early 17th century as a special type of still life by the artists Jan Brueghel the Elder and Hendrick van Balen at the request of the Italian cardinal Federico Borromeo. Other artists involved in the early development of the genre included Andries Daniels, Peter Paul Rubens and Daniel Seghers. The genre was initially connected to the visual imagery of the Counter-Reformation movement. It was further inspired by the cult of veneration and devotion to Mary prevalent at the Habsburg court (then the rulers over the Southern Netherlands) and in Antwerp generally.

Coques is believed to have collaborated with specialist still life painters Gerard Seghers, Jan Brueghel the Younger and Catarina Ykens (I) on garland paintings.
