= Van de Werve =

(Van) de(r) Werve is a Flemish surname. It may refer to:

- Noble House of van de Werve, dating back to the 13th century
- Guido van der Werve (born 1977), Dutch filmmaker and visual artist
- Claus de Werve (c. 1380 – 1439), Dutch sculptor
