= David Ryckaert III =

Flemish painter (1612–1661)

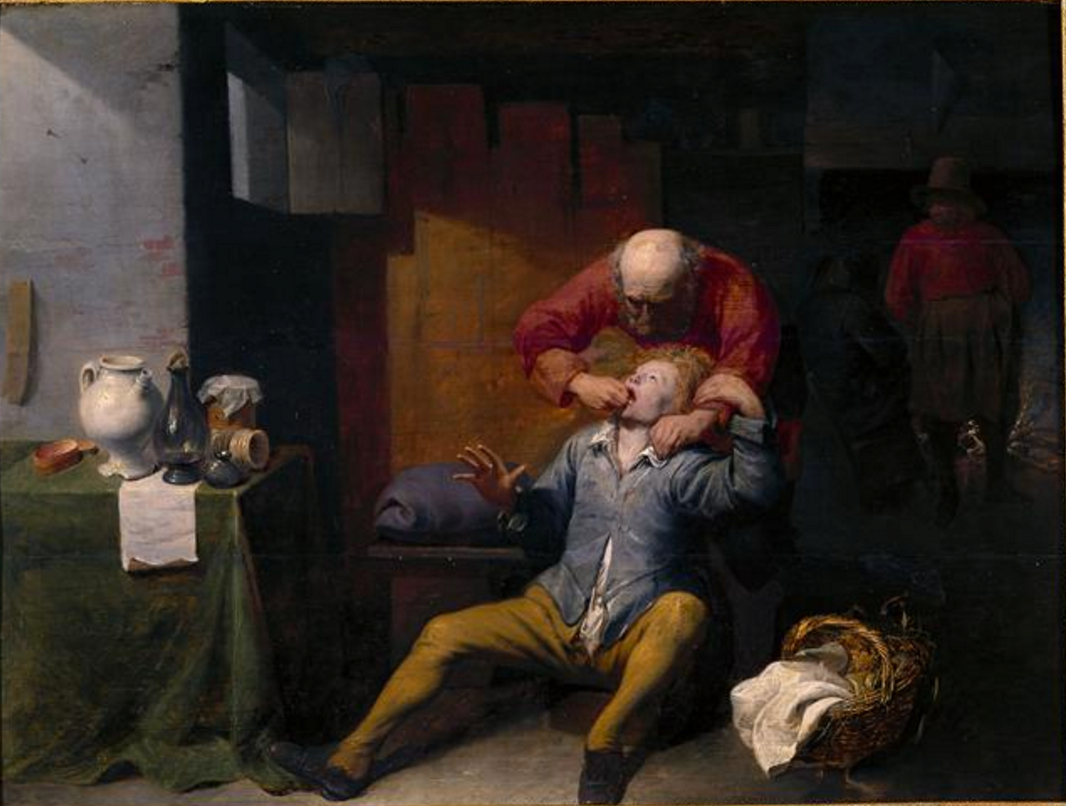
The toothpuller

David Ryckaert III, David Rijckaert III or David Rijckaert the Younger (2 December 1612, Antwerp – 11 November 1661, Antwerp) was a Flemish painter known for his contribution to genre painting, in particular through his scenes of merry companies and peasants. He also painted hell scenes and images of alchemists. He enjoyed the patronage of prominent patrons and was a painter to the court of the governor of the Southern Netherlands.

== Life ==
David Ryckaert III was born in Antwerp on 2 December 1612 and was baptized in the St. James' Church on the same date. He was the second of three children of David Rijckaert II and Katelijne de Meere (or Catharina de Merre). As the only son, he was named after his father. A member of the Ryckaert (or Rijckaert) family of artists, he was the grandson of David Rijckaert I and the nephew of Marten Ryckaert. He had an uncle called Pauwels who was also a painter, but of whom no known works exist.

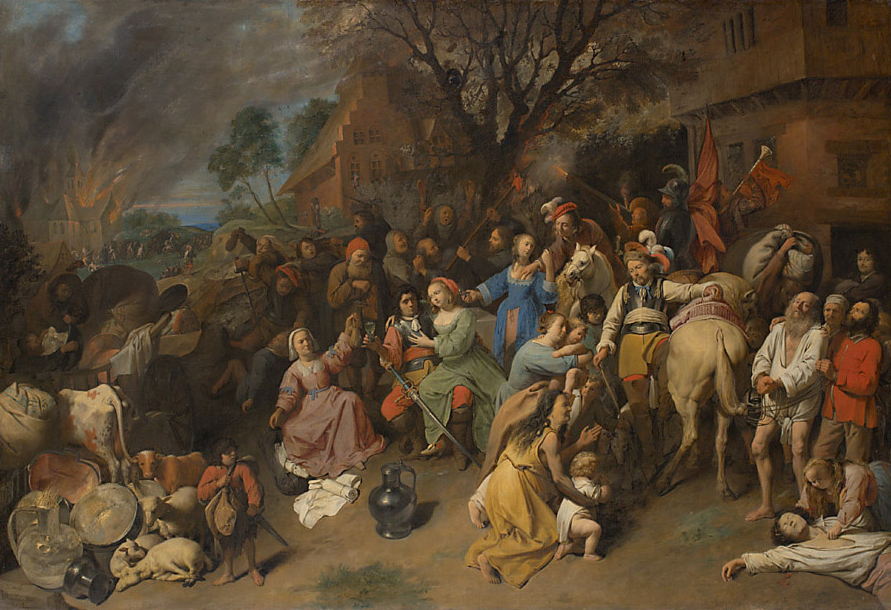
Looting of a village

His father was a painter and art dealer. It was earlier believed that his father was a painter of landscapes and genre scenes. This view changed when in 1995 Christie's auctioned a painting referred to as Still life with shells with a nautilus, vases, glasses and Chinese porcelain, which was signed and dated 'DAVIDT.RYCKAERTS. / .1616.' The art historian Fred Meijer was able to attribute this work to David Rijckaert II. This led to the attribution to David Rijckaert II of more still life works. David Ryckaert III was a pupil of his father. He became master of the Guild of Saint Luke in Antwerp in 1636-37 and was registered as a 'wijnmeester', i.e. the son of a master. He held the position of dean of the Guild in 1652–53.

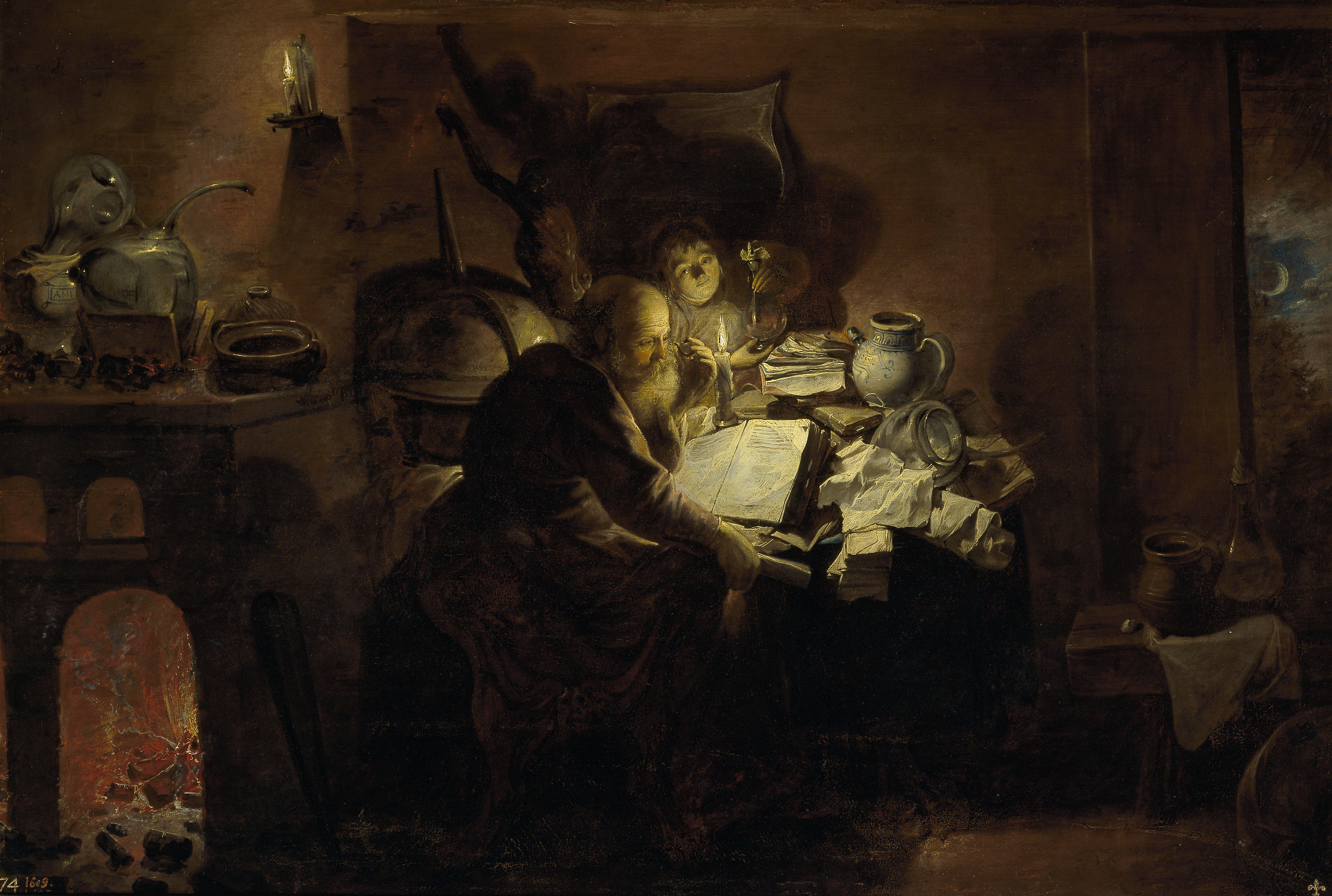
The alchemist

He was one of the many Antwerp artists who were invited to work on the decorations for the Joyous Entry into Antwerp of the new governor of the Habsburg Netherlands Cardinal-Infante Ferdinand in 1635. Rubens was in overall charge of this project. Ryckaert was tasked to paint together with Antwerp painter Jan van Eyck the final triumphal arch for the event. The painting was an allegorical representation of the glorification of Cardinal-Infante Ferdinand.

He was the teacher of Hans la Croys, Jacob Lafosse II and Erasmus de Bie. His sister Margaret married his father's pupil Gonzales Coques who became a successful painter.

David Ryckaert III worked his entire career in Antwerp. He married on 31 August 1647 with Jacoba Palmans with whom he had eight children.

His work was very well received and one of his patrons was Archduke Leopold Wilhelm of Austria, the Governor of the Southern Netherlands from 1647 until 1656.

== Work ==
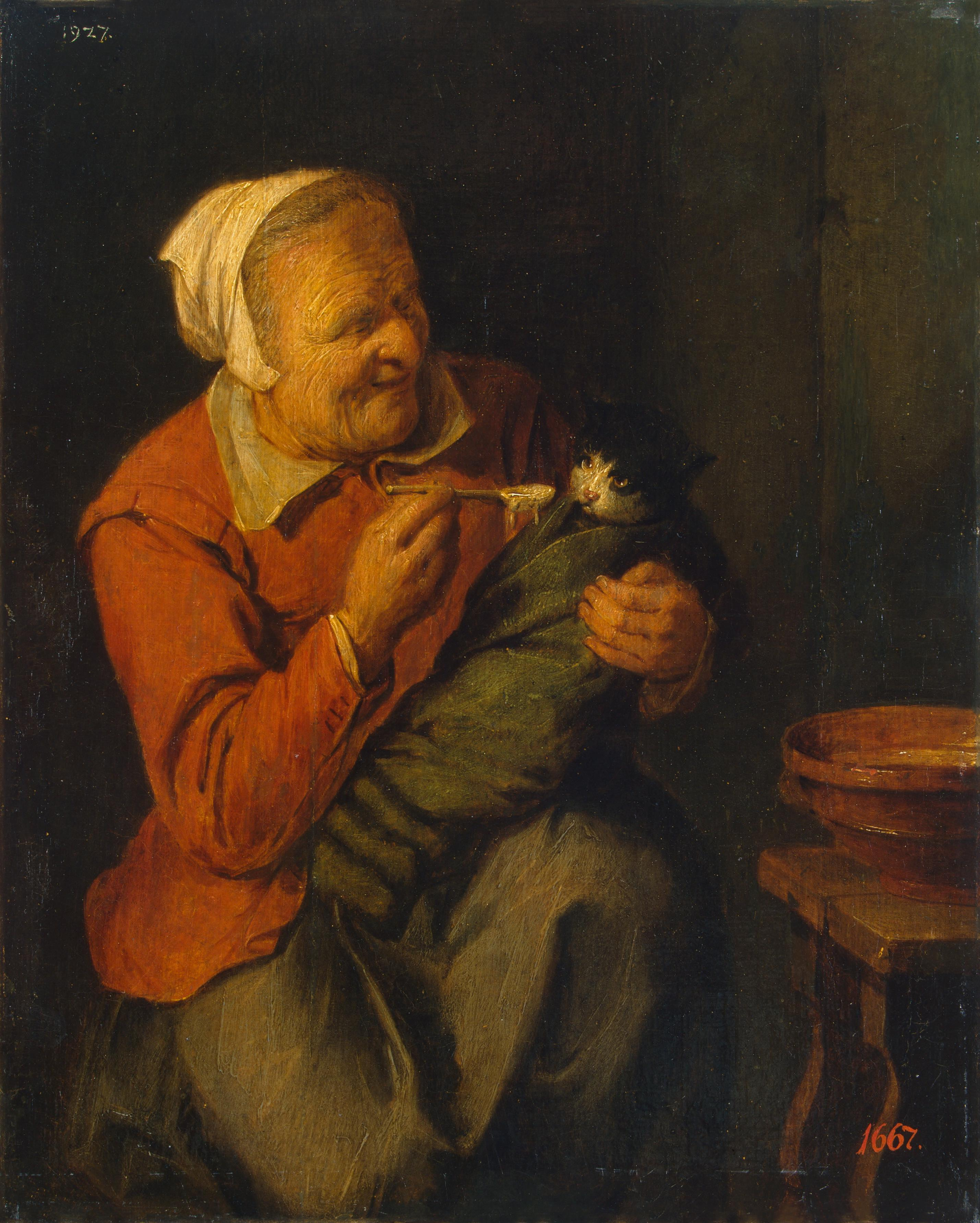
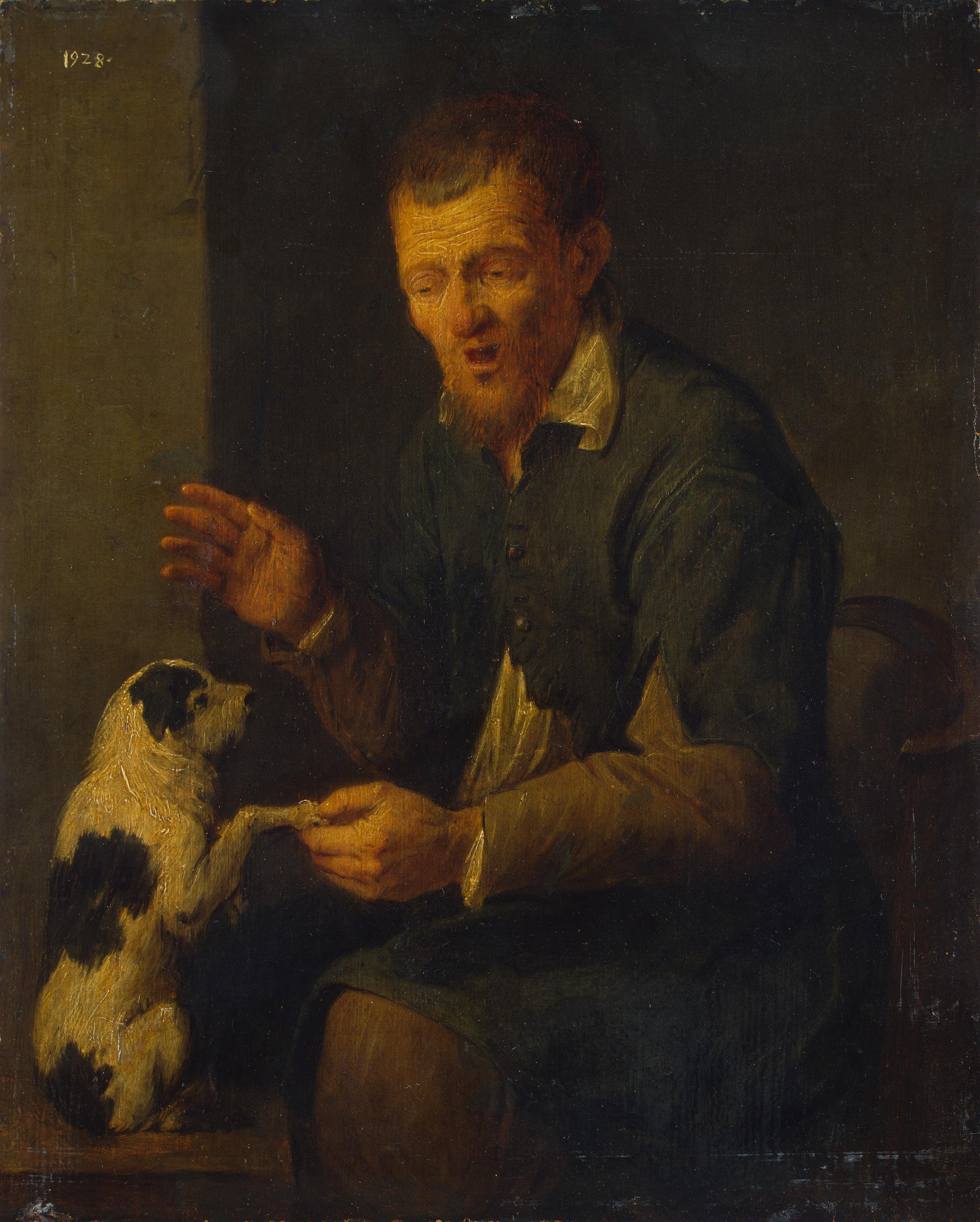
Allegories of taste and touch

Ryckaert began his career as a landscape painter. He changed his specialization early on to genre paintings. These show the influence of the leading Flemish genre painters Adriaen Brouwer, David Teniers the Elder, and in particular David Teniers the Younger. His work often depicts interiors with professionals, such as alchemists, quacks, cobblers or painters or inns with peasants. He also painted children at play, celebrations with music and imaginary scenes of witches and ghosts. An example of the latter is the Dulle Griet (Mad Griet) in the Kunsthistorisches Museum, Vienna, which depicts the folk figure of the Mad Griet, a woman who had defend herself against devils. Many of his works are signed and dated making it easy to follow his artistic development from 1637 to 1661.

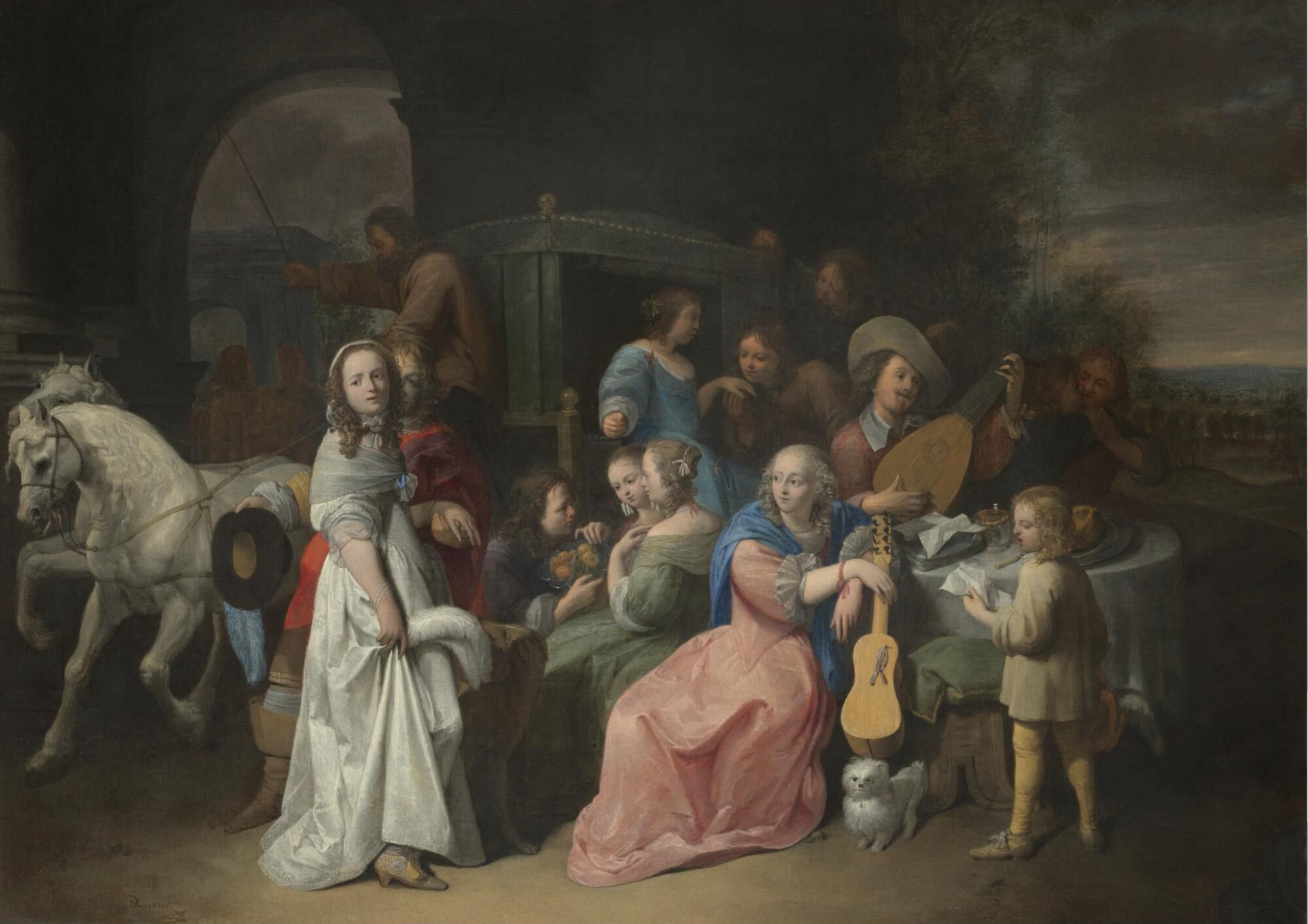
Elegant company with musicians

Ryckaert's early genre paintings show a strong influence of Adriaen Brouwer. An example are the two companion paintings of a Peasant woman with a cat and a Peasant with a Dog in the Hermitage Museum. The compositions reprise in subject matter and composition two paintings of Brouwer. Ryckaert changed details of the compositions and turned them into allegories of taste (the woman is feeding the cat) and touch (the man is holding the paw of the dog). The composition with the dog also includes the motif of training the dog as the man is clearly giving the dog the command 'sit'.

Between about 1640 and 1650 his genre paintings underwent an important development: rather than portraying coarse peasants he started painting groups composed of worthy people, often engaged in the playing of music. This change in style was possibly a reaction to the 1647 arrival in Brussels of the Archduke Leopold Wilhelm of Austria, the governor of the Southern Netherlands. Leopold Wilhelm was no fan of Ryckaert's early coarse tavern and barn interiors, as he preferred more refined scenes. The shift in style was ultimately a success as four paintings by Ryckaert are mentioned in the Archduke's inventory of 1659. At the same time he borrowed new themes from other artists. For instance, in Alchemist in his laboratory (1648, Royal Museums of Fine Arts of Belgium, Brussels) he borrowed a subject that often appeared in the work of Teniers the Younger. Through the influence of Teniers, Ryckaert changed his style by putting a greater emphasis on distinct colors and decorative qualities. Additionally, he adopted the chiaroscuro method. This is particularly noticeable in his paintings of alchemists. Around 1650 Ryckaert began to paint religious and mythological subjects.

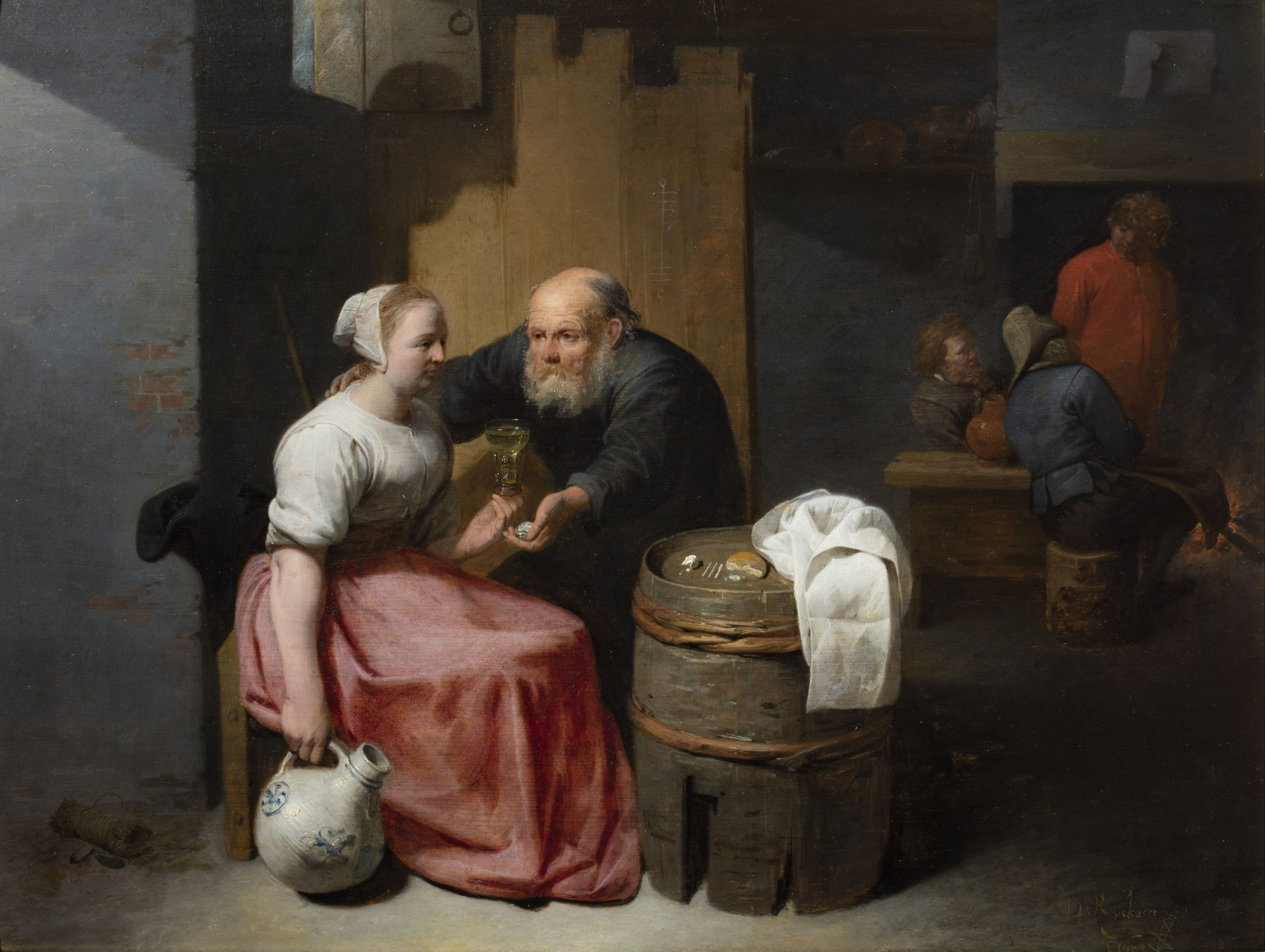
The proposition

The final stage in the stylistic development of Ryckaert is illustrated by his painting In the inn (Osterriethhuis, Antwerp) in which Ryckaert adapted Teniers' anecdotal way of painting to a scene of an idyllic and sentimental character.
