= David Rijckaert II =

Flemish painter

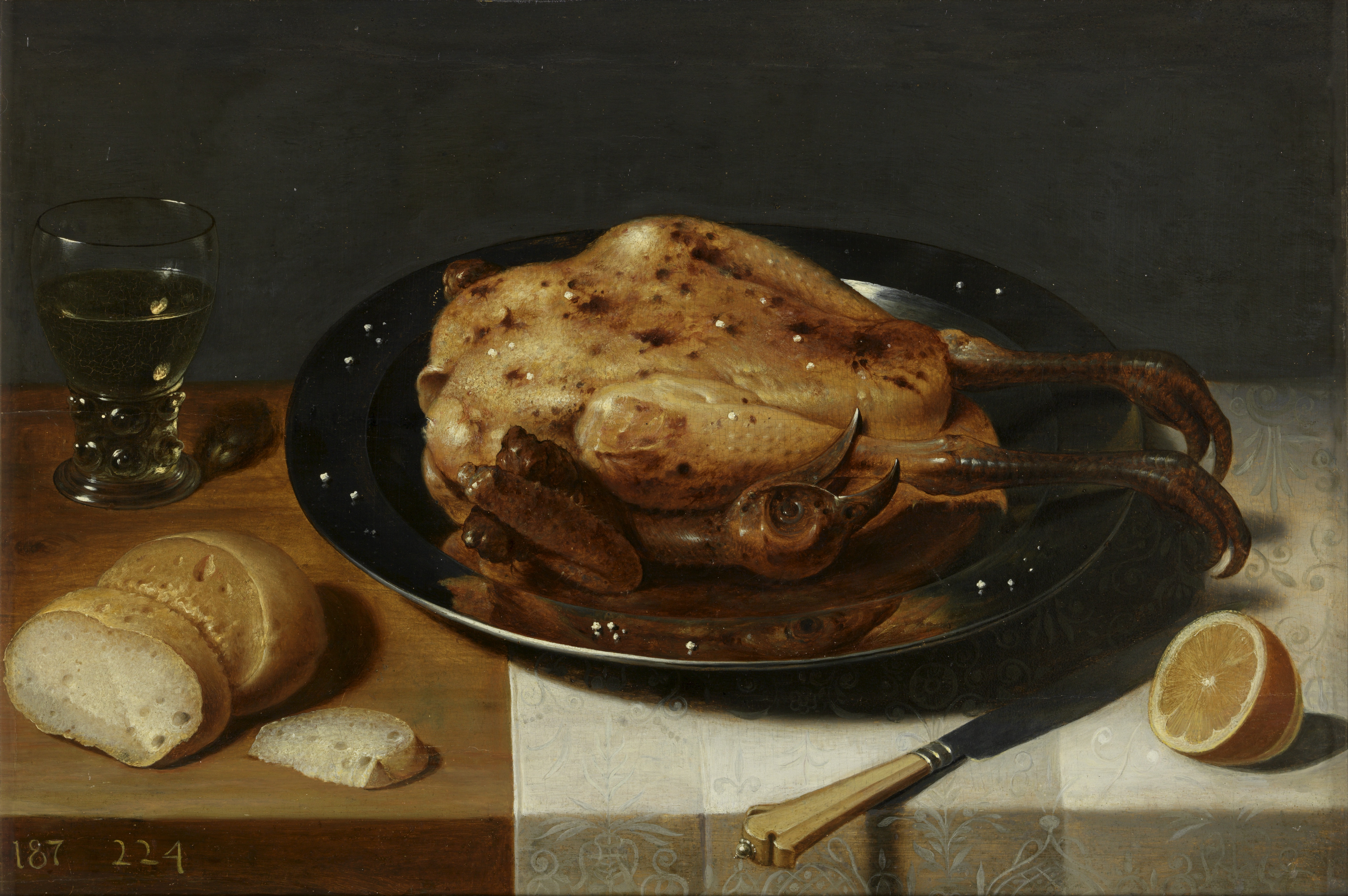
Still life with a lemon and capon

David Rijckaert II (1586 in Antwerp – 1642 in Antwerp) was a Flemish painter and art dealer active in Antwerp. He contributed to the early development of still lifes as an independent genre through his delicate rendering of banquets and sumptuous tabletop still lifes.

== Life ==
David Rijckaert II was born in Antwerp in 1586 as the oldest child of David Rijckaert the Elder and Catharina Rem. As the family was Protestant, young David was not baptized in a Catholic church. After the restrictions on Protestants became tighter, his parents reconverted to Catholicism and had David baptized in the Antwerp Cathedral following Catholic rites on 9 August 1589. This was a few days before they married each other for a second time in a Catholic church. David the Elder was a brewer and a painter of wooden statues who had become a master of the Antwerp Guild of Saint Luke in 1585. He is also mentioned as a dealer in paintings. David Rijckaert II had 7 younger siblings of whom Marten (born in 1587) became a prominent landscape painter.

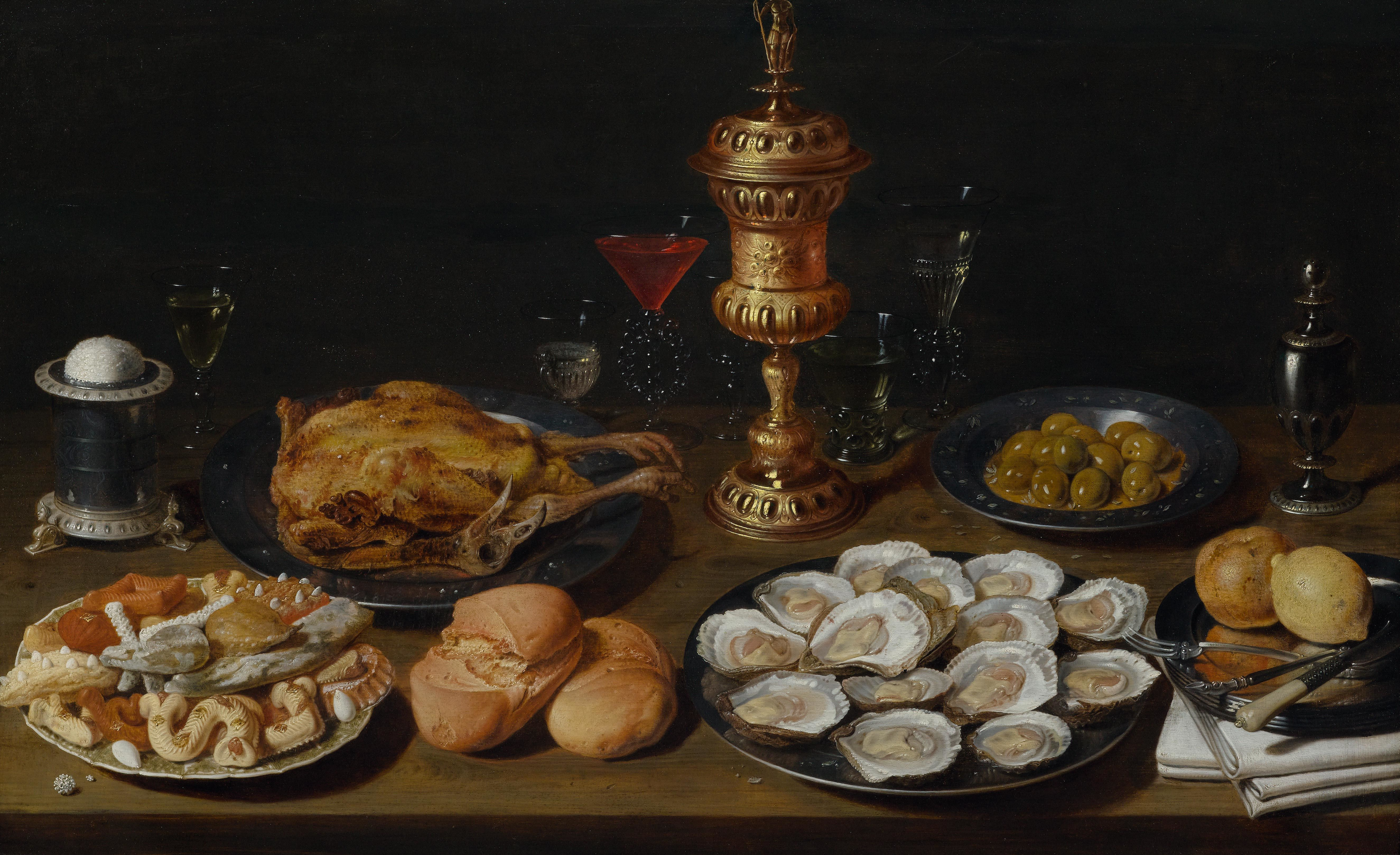
Still life with a capon, oysters, bread, pastries, glasses and a goblet

David trained with his father and became a master painter of the Antwerp Guild of Saint Luke in the guild year 1607–1608. David Rijckaert II spent his entire career in Antwerp. He married Catharina de Merre on 19 July 1608. The couple had at least two children: Catharina in 1610 and David III in 1612. Some records note a second daughter Martina born in 1616.

David Rijckaert II appears not to have achieved great success as a painter. He likely worked as an art dealer to supplement his income. He never had sufficient resources to buy a property. Nevertheless, he must have enjoyed a good reputation among fellow artists as the young Peter Paul Rubens collaborated with him on the Sleeping Silenus (circa 1611, Academy of Fine Arts Vienna). Ryckaert was tasked with adding the glasses, metalwork and porcelain to the composition of Rubens. A third artist painted in the grapes.

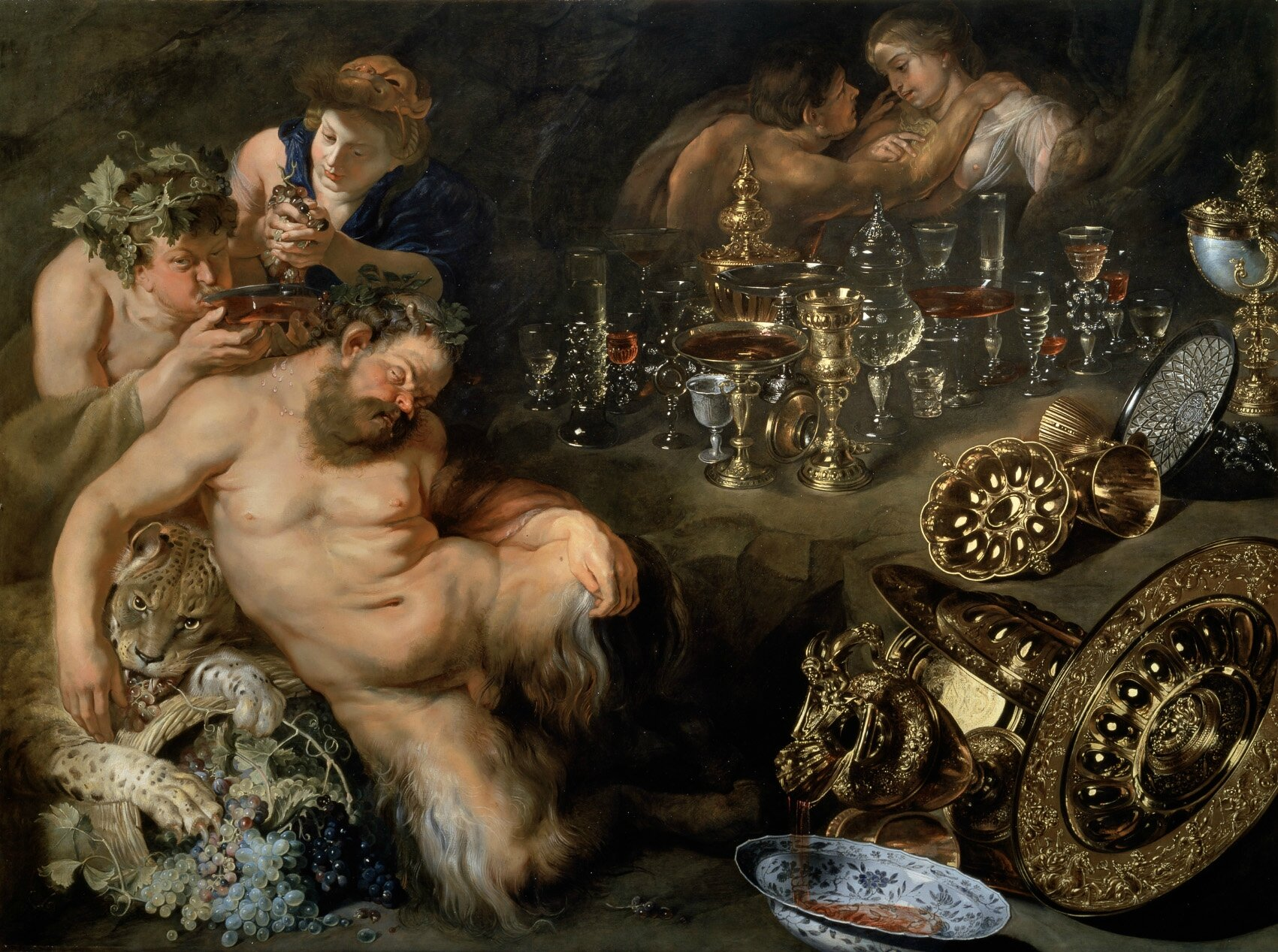
Sleeping Silenus

He died in 1642 in Antwerp where he was buried on 3 October of that year. After he was buried on 3 October 1642 his small estate was confiscated.

David Rijckaert II was the teacher of his son David III, who became a prominent genre painter. Even though not registered as such at the Guild, Gonzales Coques was also his pupil and became a leading Antwerp portrait painter. He married his daughter Catharina. In addition, Carel Ruwaert was registered as his pupil in the guild year 1609–1610, Jan Speeck in 1611 and Fransiskus de Fonteyn in the guild year 1628–1629.

== Work ==
David Rijckaert II was earlier believed to have been a painter of landscapes as well as genre scenes. The current view is that he did not paint landscapes as the attribution of landscapes to him was the result of a mix-up with his brother Marten, a prominent landscape painter. The genre scenes formerly attributed to him are now held to be by the hand of his son David III.

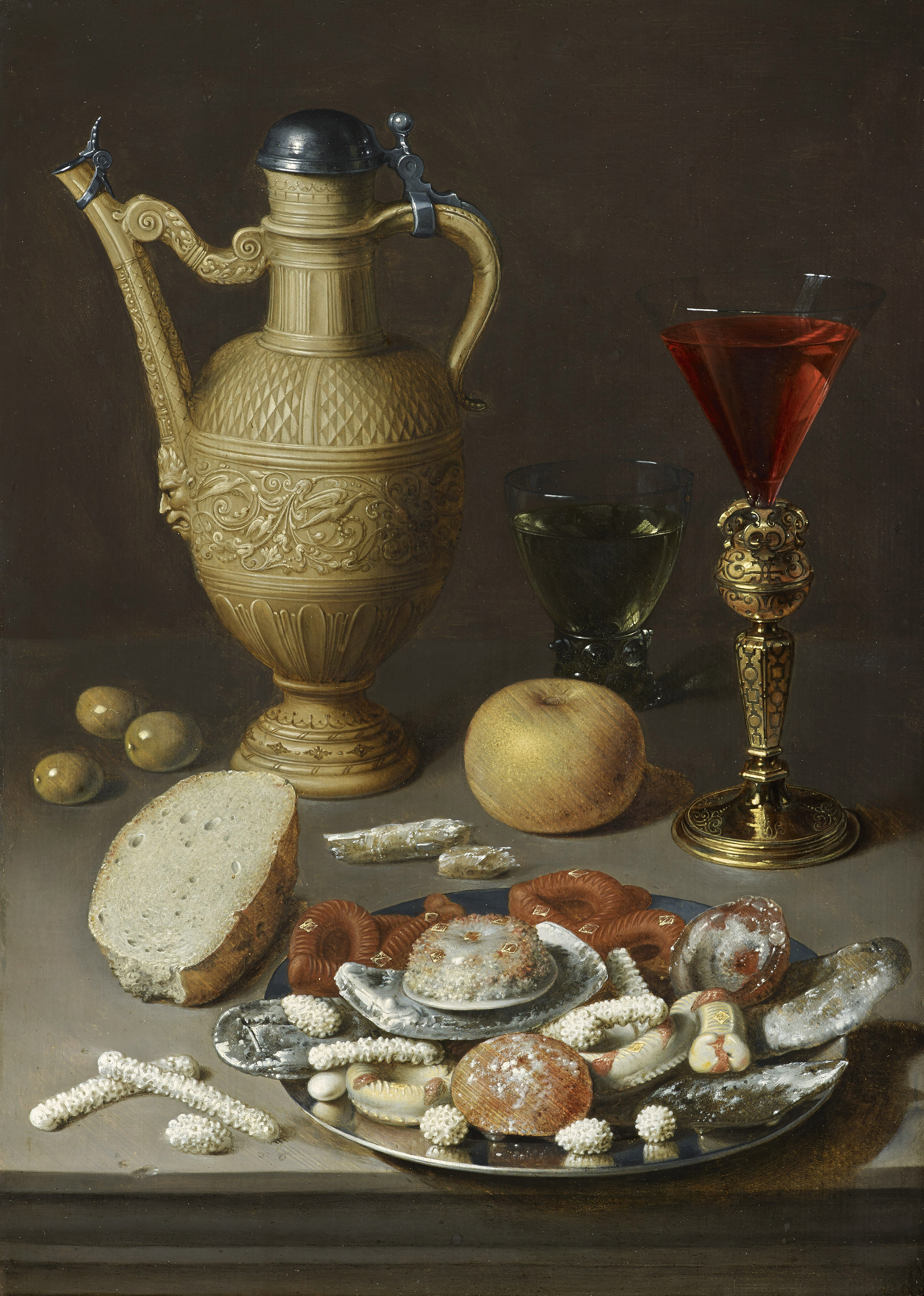
A stoneware ewer, a Berkemeyer, a conical glass in a goblet holder and confectionery on a silver platter

It was only in 1995 when Christie's offered the Still life with shells with a nautilus, vases, glasses and Chinese porcelain, which was signed and dated 'DAVIDT.RYCKAERTS. / .1616.' for sale that the art historian Fred Meijer identified the artist of the piece as David Rijckaert II. This led to the conclusion that David Rijckaert II was in fact a specialist still life painter rather than a landscape or genre painter. David Rijckaert II remains to date a relatively mysterious and obscure artist since art historians are still in the process of putting together his œuvre from a few signed works. New attributions still occur such as in 2009 when the Still life with a lemon and capon in the Rijksmuseum Twenthe was attributed to Ryckaert. There are currently only about 15 still lifes attributed to David Rijckaert II. As his style is close to that of the leading Antwerp still life painters Osias Beert and Jacob Foppens van Es, some of his works were previously attributed to these two artists. This is for instance the case with the Still life with lobster at the Royal Museums of Fine Arts of Belgium, formerly attributed to Osias Beert and the Still life with oysters, fruit, biscuits and ornamental tableware in the Museum of Fine Arts, Ghent, formerly attributed to Osias Beert and Jacob Foppens van Es.

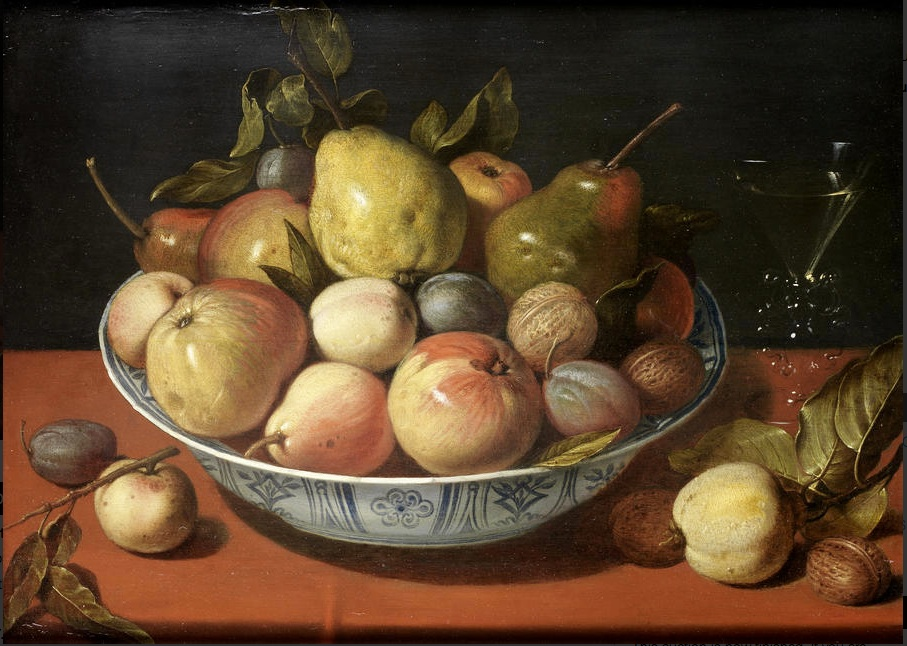
Apples, pears, plums and other fruit with walnuts in a wan-li bowl

The known works of David Rijckaert II fall into two categories: sumptuous still lifes of porcelain, expensive glassware, silverware, pewter dishes, etc. and so-called ‘banketjes’, i.e. banquet or breakfast pieces depicting food on a tabletop. His works follow the stylistic characteristics of the earliest still life painters Osias Beert (c. 1580–late 1624), Georg Flegel (1566–1638) and Clara Peeters (1589?–1657) in their chromatic palette, sharply illuminated foreground and meticulous, realistic rendering of the objects depicted. They also resemble to a lesser extent the work of his contemporary, the Antwerp still life artist Jacob van Hulsdonck. The market for his small cabinet pictures would have been educated collectors of Antwerp who were familiar with their symbolism and religious references.

Ryckaert's compositions are painstakingly constructed with meticulous attention to detail. The objects and forms are arranged in separation from each other on the inclined surface of a table. By juxtaposing food, dishes and precious objects within various planes in space, David Rijckaert II was able to increase their legibility. The frontal and distributive presentation is still archaic while his attention for detail and strong realism show his adherence to the Flemish tradition. Characteristic for his style are the dark abstract backgrounds and the bright, enamel-like colours.
