= David Teniers the Younger =

Flemish Baroque painter (1610–1690)

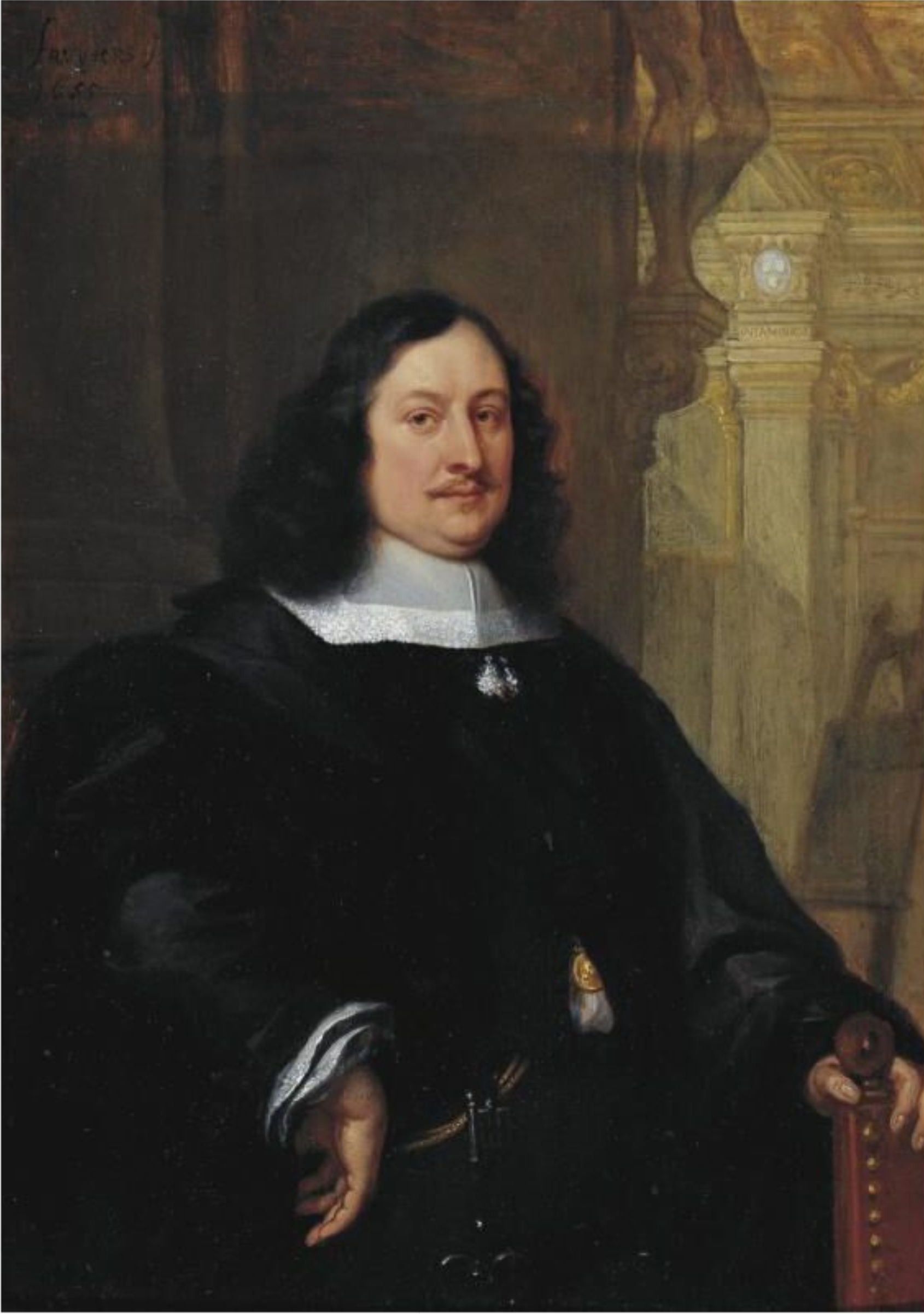
- Portrait of David Teniers by Philip Fruytiers, 1655
- Born: 1610; Antwerp, Brabant, Spanish Netherlands
- Died: 25 April 1690 (aged 79–80); Brussels, Brabant, Spanish Netherlands
- Other name: David Teniers II
- Occupations: Painter, printmaker, draughtsman, miniaturist painter, staffage painter, copyist, art curator
- Spouses: Anna Brueghel (m. 1637–1656); Isabella de Fren (m. 1656)
- Children: 11, including David III
- Father: David Teniers the Elder
- Family: Abraham Teniers (brother)

Signature
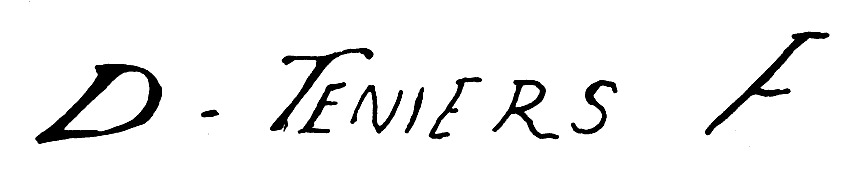

David Teniers the Younger or David Teniers II (bapt. 15 December 1610 – 25 April 1690) was a Flemish Baroque painter, printmaker, and artist. He was an extremely versatile artist known for his prolific output. He was an innovator in a wide range of genres such as history painting, genre painting, landscape painting, portrait and still life. He is now best remembered as the leading Flemish genre painter of his day. Teniers is particularly known for developing the peasant genre, the tavern scene, pictures of collections and scenes with alchemists and physicians.

He was court painter and the curator of the collection of Archduke Leopold Wilhelm, the art-loving Governor General of the Habsburg Netherlands. He created a printed catalogue of the collections of the Archduke. He was the founder of the Antwerp Academy, where young artists were trained to draw and sculpt in the hope of reviving Flemish art after its decline following the death of the leading Flemish artists Peter Paul Rubens and Anthony van Dyck in the early 1640s. He influenced the next generation of Northern genre painters as well as French Rococo painters such as Antoine Watteau.

== Life ==
=== Initial career in Antwerp ===
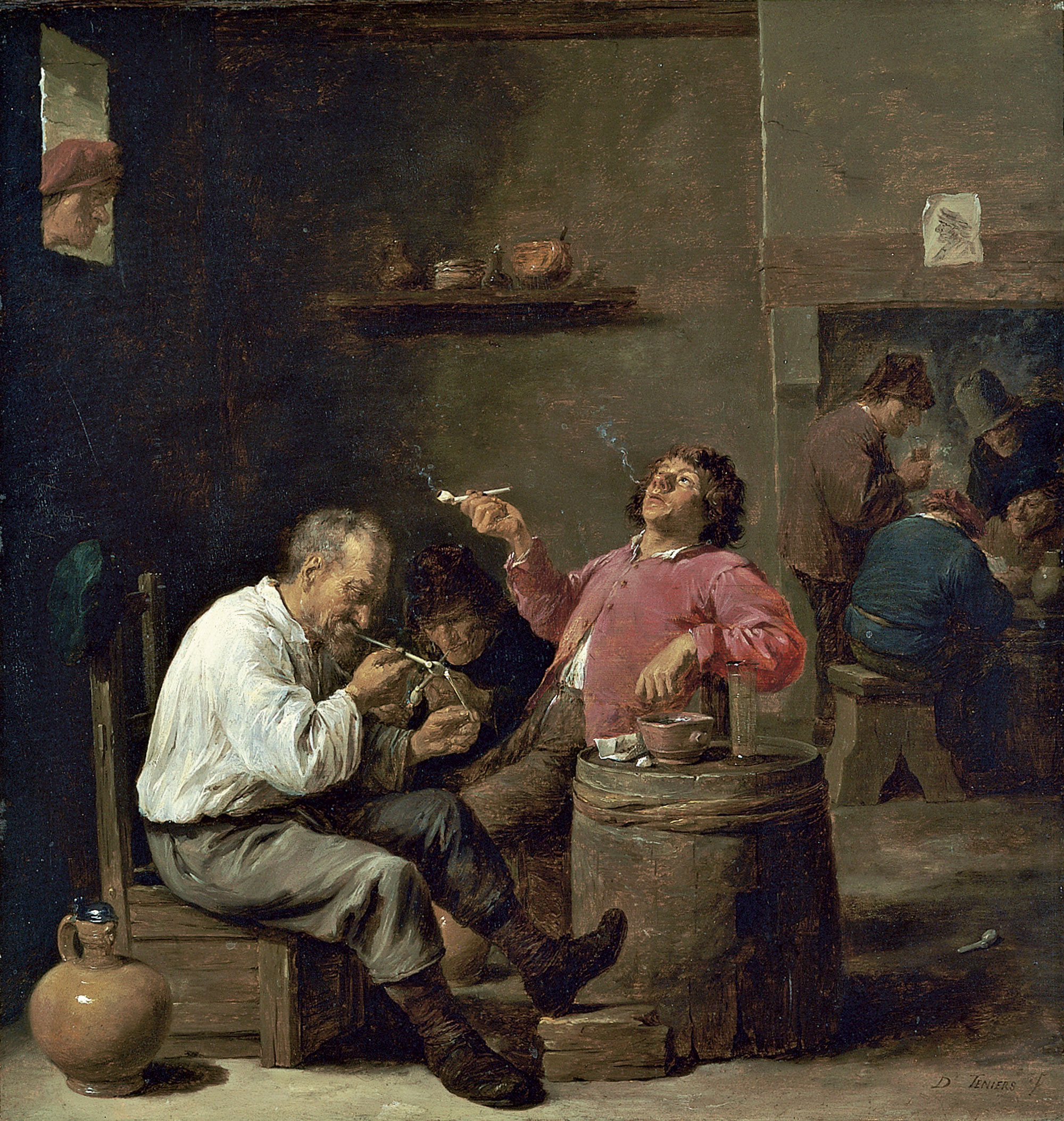
Smokers in an interior, c. 1637, oil on panel

David Teniers the Younger was born in Antwerp as the son of David Teniers the Elder and Dymphna de Wilde. His father was a painter of altarpieces and small-scale cabinet paintings. David was baptised at St. James' Church on 15 December 1610. Three of his brothers also became painters: Juliaan III (1616–1679), Theodoor (1619–1697) and Abraham (1629–1670). The work of his two oldest brothers is virtually unknown. The work of his youngest brother Abraham was very close to David's own.

From 1626, David the younger studied under his father. A collaborator of his father early on in his career, the father and son pair created together a series of twelve panels recounting stories from Torquato Tasso's epic Gerusalemme Liberata (Museo del Prado, Madrid). His father was frequently in financial straits and his debts landed him occasionally in jail. David the younger had to make copies of old masters in order to support the family. In 1632–33, he was registered as 'wijnmeester' (i.e. the son of a master) in the Antwerp Guild of Saint Luke.

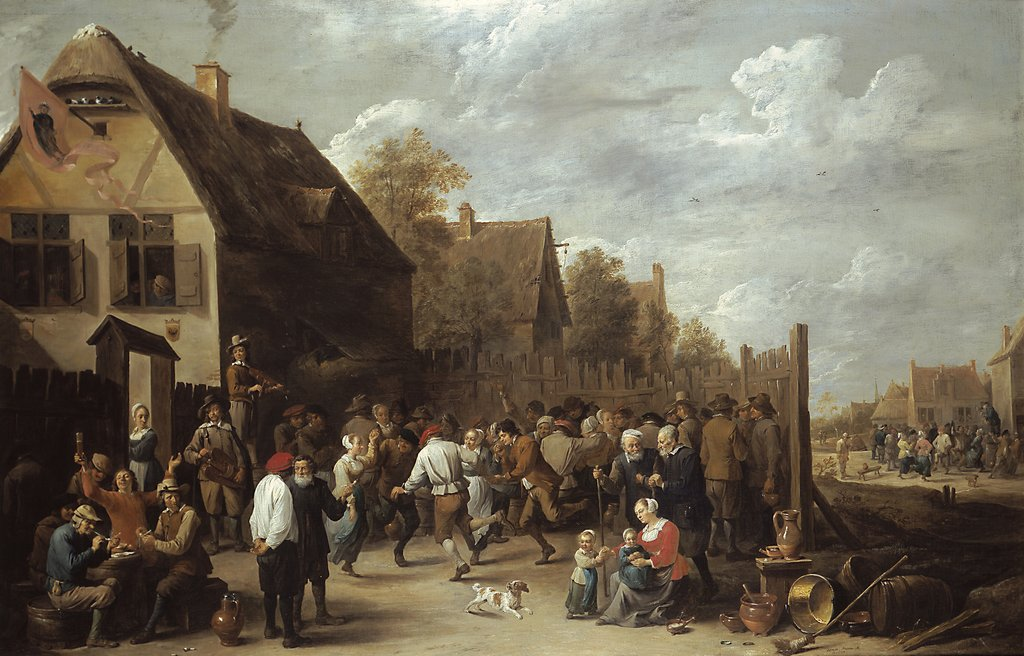
Village festival, 1645, oil on canvas

A David Teniers is recorded in the Antwerp records as having been issued in 1635 a passport to visit Paris. The artist likely also travelled to England as on 29 December 1635 of the same year he signed in Dover a contract with the Antwerp art dealer Chrisostomos van Immerseel, then resident in England. Rubens received in 1636 a commission from King Philip IV of Spain to create a series of mythological paintings to decorate the Torre de la Parada, a hunting lodge of the King near Madrid. The mythological scenes depicted in the series were largely based on the Metamorphoses of Ovid. Rubens realized this important commission with the assistance of a large number of Antwerp painters such as Jacob Jordaens, Cornelis de Vos, Jan Cossiers, Peter Snayers, Thomas Willeboirts Bosschaert, Theodoor van Thulden, Jan Boeckhorst, Peeter Symons, Jacob Peter Gowy and others, who worked after Rubens' modellos. Teniers was also invited to participate in this project and make a picture after Rubens' design. That painting is considered lost.

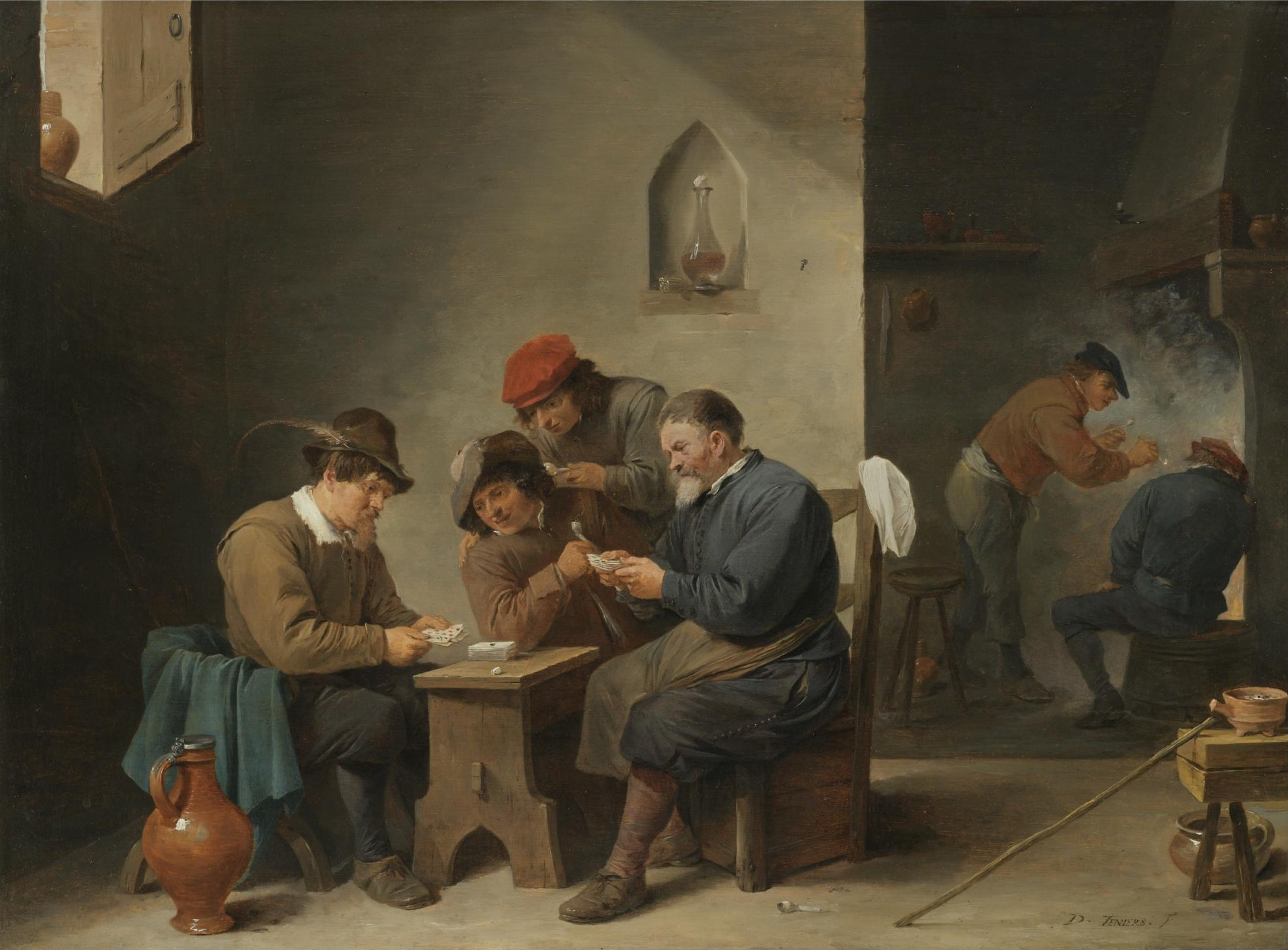
Card players, c. 1644–45, oil on panel

Teniers married into the famous Brueghel artist family when Anna Brueghel, daughter of Jan Brueghel the Elder, became his wife on 22 July 1637. Rubens, who had been the guardian of Anna Brueghel after her father's death, was a witness at the wedding. Through his marriage Teniers was able to cement a close relationship with Rubens who had been a good friend and frequent collaborator with his wife's father. This is borne out by the fact that at the baptism of the first of the couple's seven children David Teniers III, Rubens' second wife, Hélène Fourment, was the godmother. Around this time Teniers started to gain a reputation as an artist and he received many commissions. The Guild of St George (Oude Voetboog Guild), a local militia in Antwerp, commissioned a group portrait in 1643 (Hermitage Museum). Teniers was a dean of the Antwerp Guild of Saint Luke in 1644–1645. When Archduke Leopold Wilhelm of Austria became the Governor General of the Spanish Netherlands in 1647, the Archduke soon became an important patron of Teniers. The success went to the artist's head. He claimed that his grandfather Julian Taisnier, who had moved from Ath (now located in the Walloon province of Hainaut) to Antwerp in the 16th century had been from a family that had been entitled to bear a coat of arms. Teniers started to use this coat of arms consisting of a crouching bear on a field of gold encircled by three green acorns. His brother-in-law Jan Baptist Borrekens reported him and Teniers was prohibited from using the coat of arms.

=== Court painter in Brussels ===
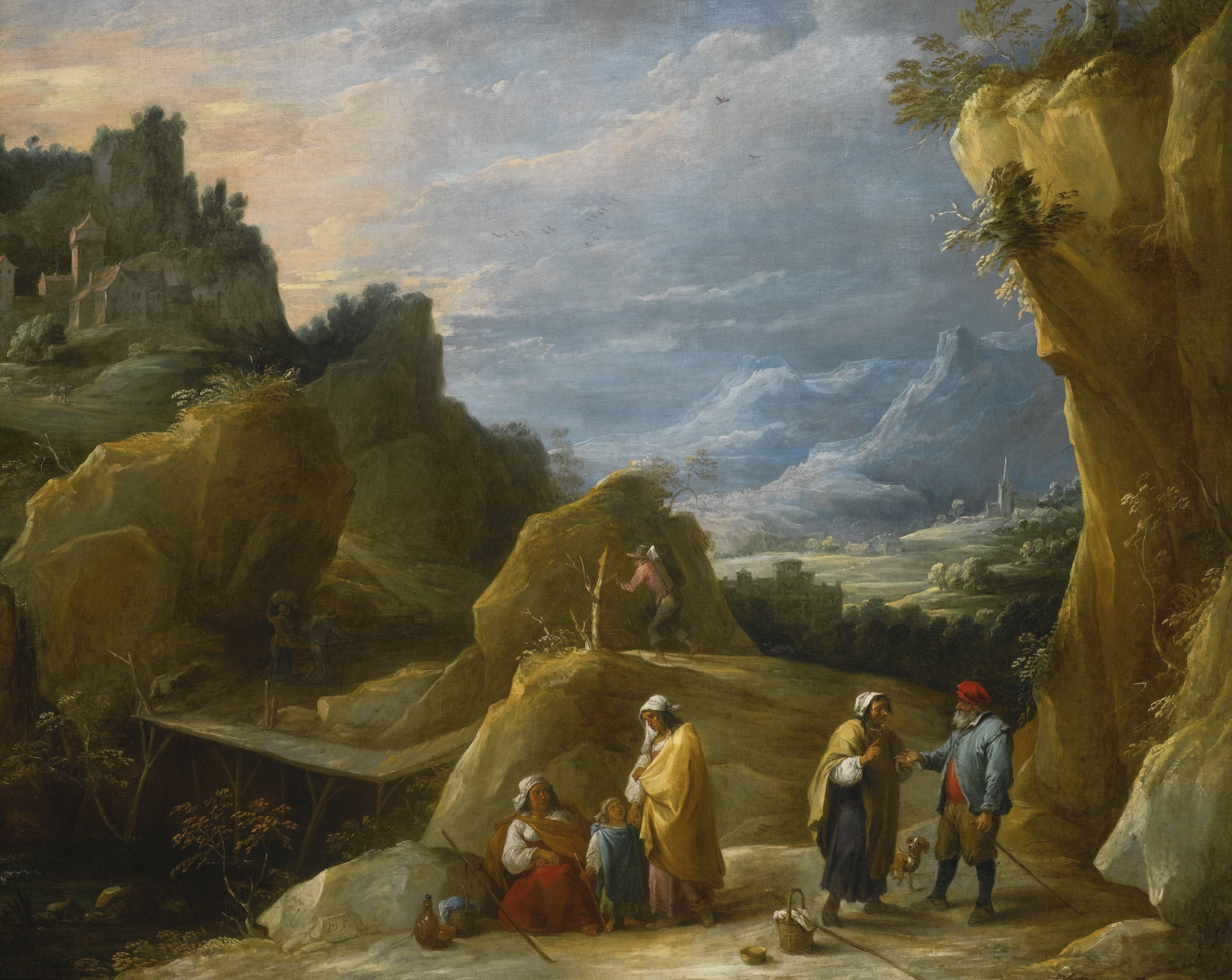
Mountain landscape with a gypsy fortune teller, after 1644, oil on canvas

Around 1650, Teniers moved to Brussels to formally enter into the service of the Archduke as a "pintor de cámara" (court painter). The Archduke asked him to be the keeper of the art gallery he had set up in his palace in Brussels. In that position he succeeded the Antwerp painter Jan van den Hoecke who had earlier worked in Vienna for the Archduke. One of Teniers's key tasks in this position was to look after and enlarge the archducal collection. Teniers put together a collection for the art gallery which included his own work and that of other artists, which he selected. He was involved in the purchase of a large number of Italian, and especially Venetian, masterpieces from the confiscated collections of Charles I of England and his Jacobite supporters. One of his most important successes was the acquisition of the major part (about 400 paintings) of the collection owned by James Hamilton, 1st Duke of Hamilton, who had been a close associate and favorite of the English King and was, like the King, executed in 1649. The Conde de Fuensaldaña, then acting as Leopold Wilhelm's lieutenant in the Southern Netherlands, also sent Teniers to England in 1651 to purchase paintings at the Pembroke and presumably other sales. The collection of the Archduke grew to incorporate about 1,300 works, mainly of leading Italian artists such as Raphael, Giorgione, Veronese and Titian (15 works by this artist alone) as well as of famous Northern artists such as Hans Holbein the Younger, Pieter Bruegel the Elder and Jan van Eyck. The collection became the foundation and nucleus of the collection of the Kunsthistorisches Museum in Vienna.

The Archduke also promoted Teniers's art by giving his compositions to other European rulers as presents. As a result, many of these rulers also became patrons of the artist. The bishop of Ghent Anthonius Triest, the Stadtholder Prince Frederik Hendrik of Orange, Christina, Queen of Sweden, William II, Prince of Orange and Philip IV of Spain were among his patrons. Only King Louis XIV of France does not seem to have liked Teniers's work. According to a story, when presented with a peasant scene by Teniers the French king asked for the 'magots' (baboons) to be removed from his sight as soon as possible.

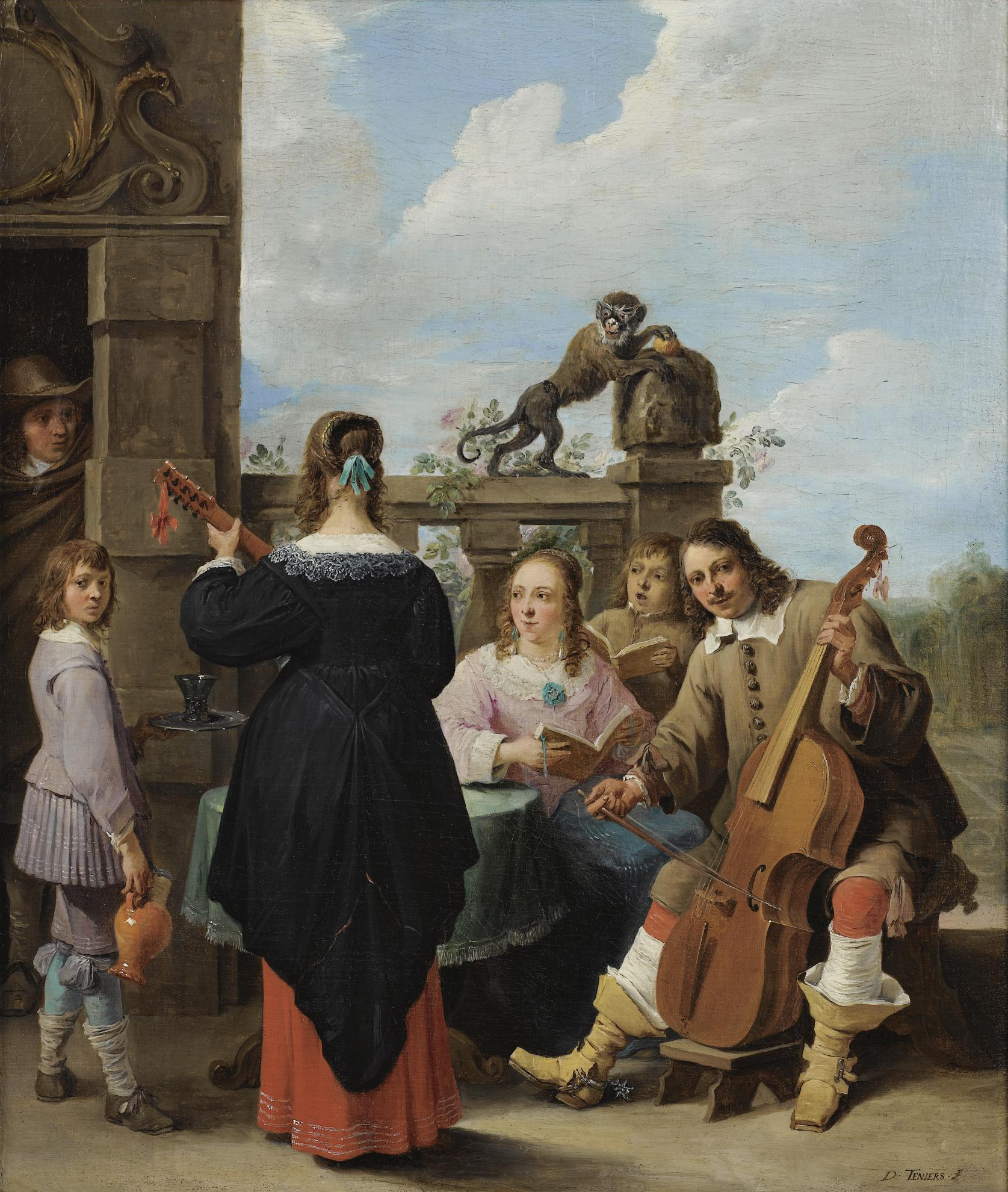
A family concert on the terrace of a country house: a self-portrait of the artist with his family, c. 1640–49, oil on canvas

Teniers bought a house close to the Brussels court and was promoted in 1655 to 'camerdiender' or 'ayuda de cámara' (chamberlain) by the Archduke. It was most unusual for a painter to serve as chamberlain at the Spanish court. In fact, there was only one other case, which dates from the same time: that of Diego Velázquez, whose aim was also to be elevated to the nobility. Not long after the Archduke resigned from his position as Governor General of the Spanish Netherlands and returned to Vienna with his large art collection. A Flemish priest, who was also a gifted still life painter, Jan Anton van der Baren, moved with Leopold Wilhelm from Brussels to Vienna where he was the successor of Teniers as the director of the archducal gallery in Vienna. The new Governor General of the Spanish Netherlands, Don Juan of Austria continued the support for the artist that he had enjoyed from his predecessor the Archduke Leopold Wilhelm. The early Flemish biographer Cornelis de Bie reports in his Het Gulden Cabinet published in 1662 that Don Juan was an amateur artist who regularly asked Teniers to give him instructions in art. Don Juan was so taken by Teniers that he even drew a portrait of Teniers son.

Teniers's wife died on 11 May 1656. On 21 October of the same year, the artist remarried. His second wife was Isabella de Fren, the 32-year-old daughter of Andries de Fren, secretary of the Council of Brabant. It has been suggested that Teniers's main motive for marrying the 'spinster' was her rather elevated position in society. His second wife also brought him a large dowry. The couple had four children, two sons and two daughters. His second wife's attitude to Teniers's children from his first marriage would later divide the family in legal battles. Teniers petitioned the king of Spain to be admitted to the aristocracy but gave up when the condition imposed was that he should give up painting for money.

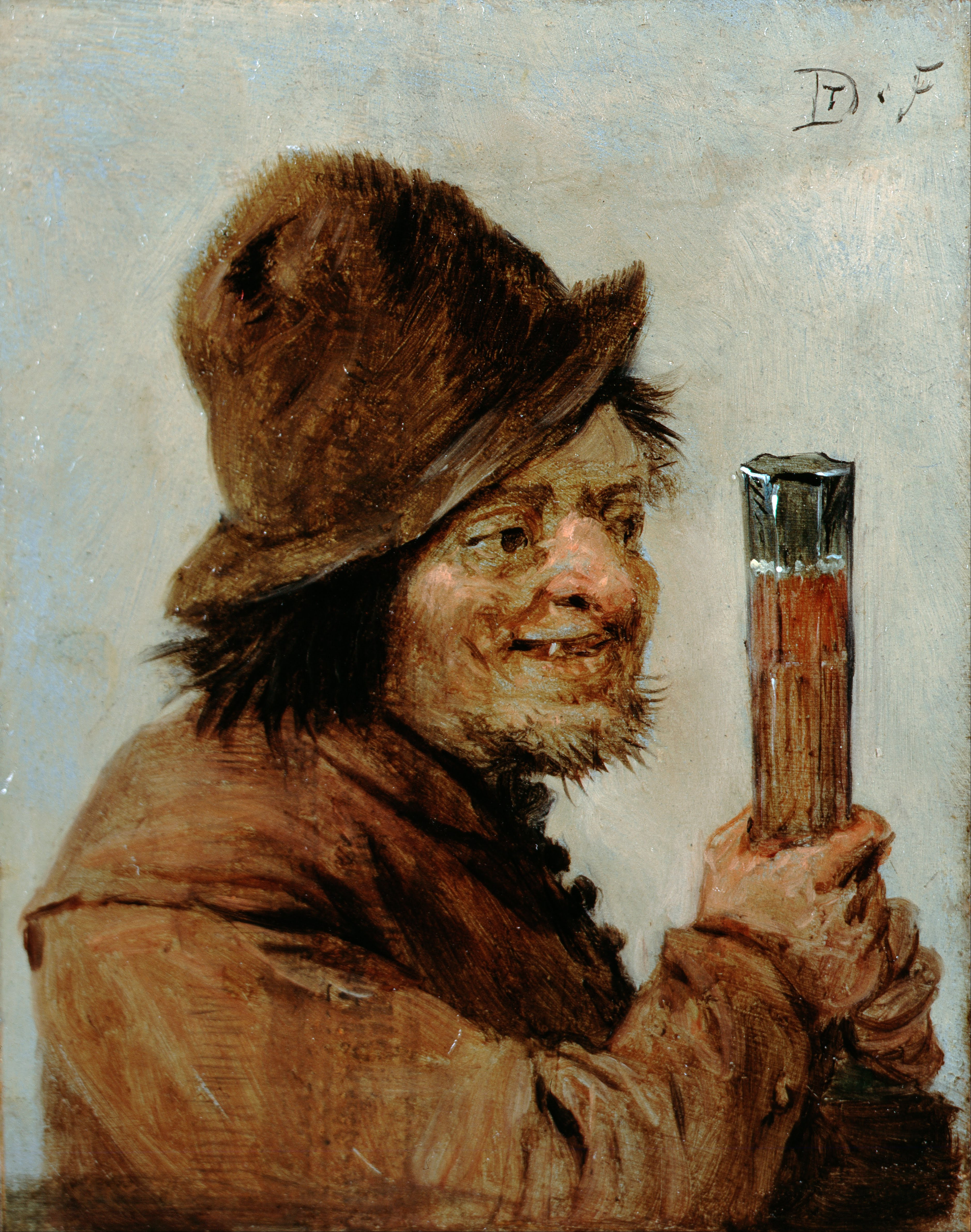
A peasant holding a glass, 1640s, oil on copper

In 1660, Teniers's Theatrum Pictorium was published in Brussels. When Don Juan of Austria ended his term as Governor General of the Spanish Netherlands in January 1659, Teniers appears to have withdrawn from active court duty. He purchased from the husband of Hélène Fourment, the widow of Rubens, a country estate called the 'Drij Toren' ('Three towers') located in Perk, in the environs of Brussels and Vilvoorde. Teniers did not cut his links with Antwerp while living and working in Brussels. Teniers maintained close contacts with artists as well as the influential art dealers in Antwerp. In particular; the firm of Matthijs Musson was instrumental in building Teniers's international reputation.

At the behest of his Antwerp colleagues of the Guild of Saint Luke, Teniers became the driving force behind the foundation of the academy in Antwerp, only the second of such type of institution in Europe after the one in Paris. The artist used his connections and sent his son David to Madrid to assist in the negotiation to successfully obtain the required licence from the Spanish king. This involved Teniers's son presenting a very expensive golden watch to one of the courtiers who could influence the Spanish king's decision on the matter. As soon as he received the royal charter creating the Antwerp Royal Academy of Fine Arts, Teniers travelled with it from Brussels to Antwerp and celebrated the accomplishment with a big banquet in the Schilderskamer of the Guild of St. Luke. When in 1674 the existence of the academy was threatened, he again used his influence at the Spanish court to save the institution.

As a court painter, Teniers was not required to become member of a local guild. Nevertheless, he became a member of the Brussels Guild of Saint Luke in 1675. In his later years, Teniers was also active as an art dealer and he organised art auctions. This brought him into conflict with his fellow artists who started proceedings to prohibit him from holding an auction in 1683. Teniers argued that he needed the proceeds of the auction because his children were suing him for their mother's part of her estate. The matter was finally settled between the parties themselves. In his final years, he lost his second wife and was involved in further lawsuits over her estate with the two surviving children of his second wife. There is evidence that in these years he suffered a decline in his prosperity and that his output was diminished.

On 25 April 1690, David Teniers died in Brussels.

His pupils included his son David, Ferdinand Apshoven the Younger, Thomas van Apshoven, Jan de Froey, Aert Maes, Abraham Teniers, and Aert van Waes. Gillis van Tilborgh is also presumed to have studied under Teniers.

== Work ==
=== Subjects ===
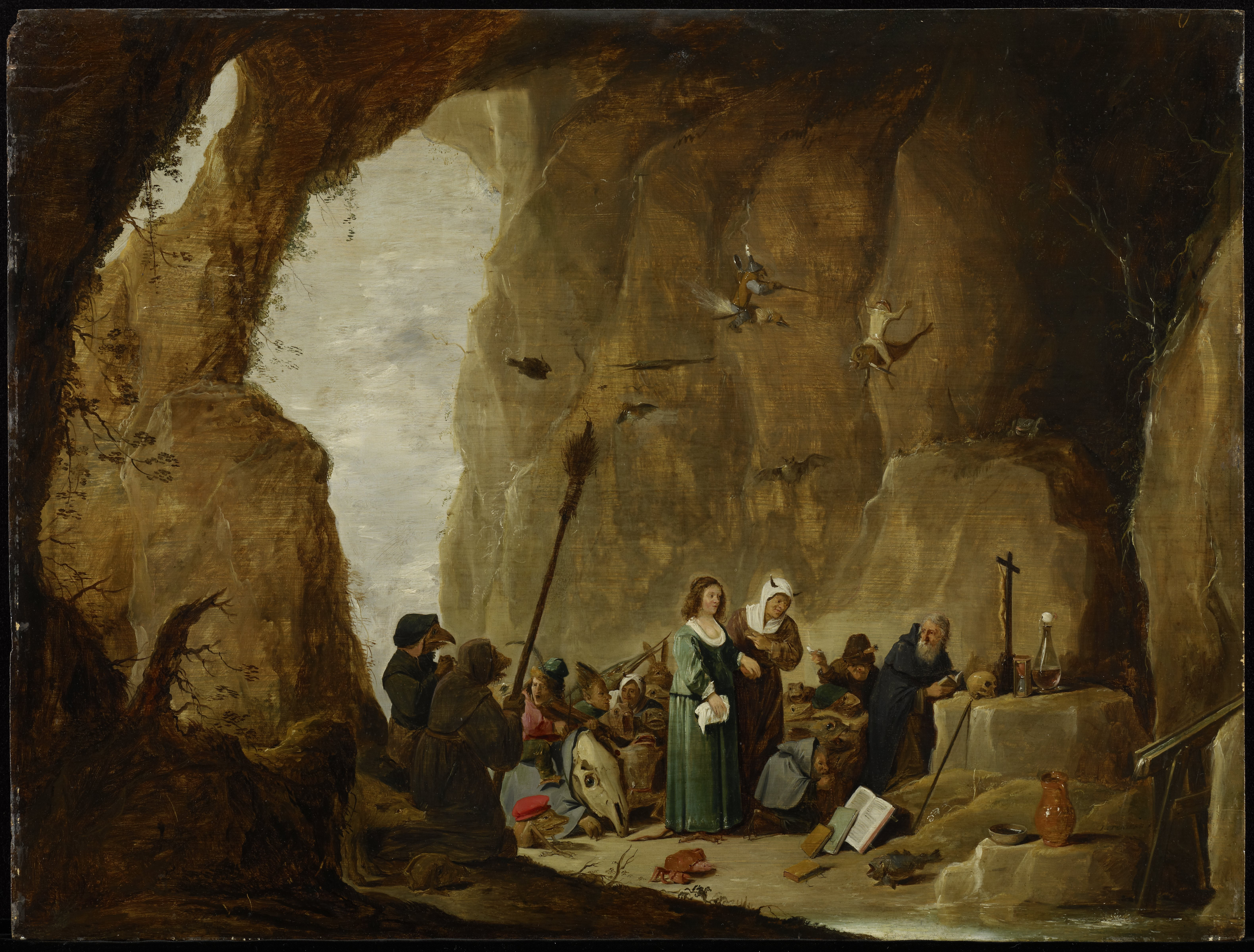
The Temptation of St. Anthony, oil on panel

Teniers was known as a hard worker who was extremely prolific. About two thousand paintings are thought to have been painted by the artist. He was extremely versatile and tried his hand at all the genres then practised in Flanders including history, genre, landscape, portrait and still life.

Teniers is particularly known for developing the peasant genre, the tavern scene and scenes with alchemists and physicians. He also painted many religious scenes among which stand out his many compositions treating the subjects of the Temptation of St Anthony and hermit saints in grottoes or deserts.

=== Evolution ===
Teniers's early works show the influence of Adam Elsheimer. This influence was transmitted to him through his father, who had studied under Elsheimer in Rome and is regarded as a follower of Elsheimer. Elsheimer was mainly known for his small cabinet paintings characterised by their innovative treatment of landscape and light effects.

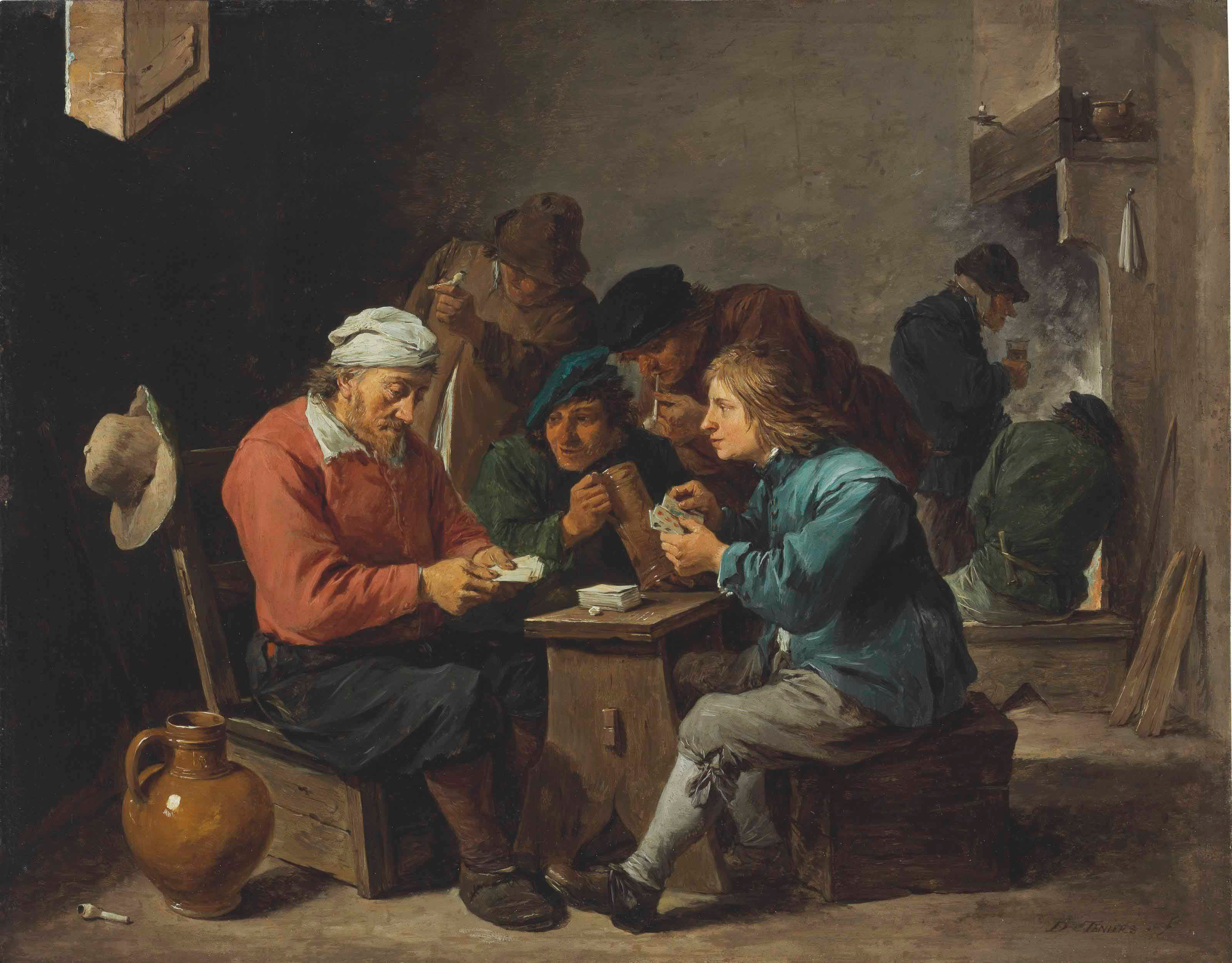
Peasants playing cards in an interior, between 1630 and 1645, oil on copper

Another major influence on David Teniers the Younger's early work was the work of the Flemish painter Adriaen Brouwer. Adriaen Brouwer was working in Antwerp from the mid-1620s to the mid-1630s after an extended residence in Haarlem. He was an important innovator of genre painting through his vivid depictions of peasants, soldiers and other 'lower class' individuals, whom he showed engaged in drinking, smoking, card or dice playing, fighting, music making etc. usually in taverns or rustic settings. Brouwer also contributed to the development of the genre of tronies, i.e. head or facial studies, which investigate varieties of expression. Teniers's early work up to the end of the thirties was very close to that of Brouwer in terms of subject matter, technique, color and composition. He took from Brouwer the gross types, placed in the characteristic smoky, dimly lit taverns. He also treated these subjects with the same monochrome tonality as Brouwer.

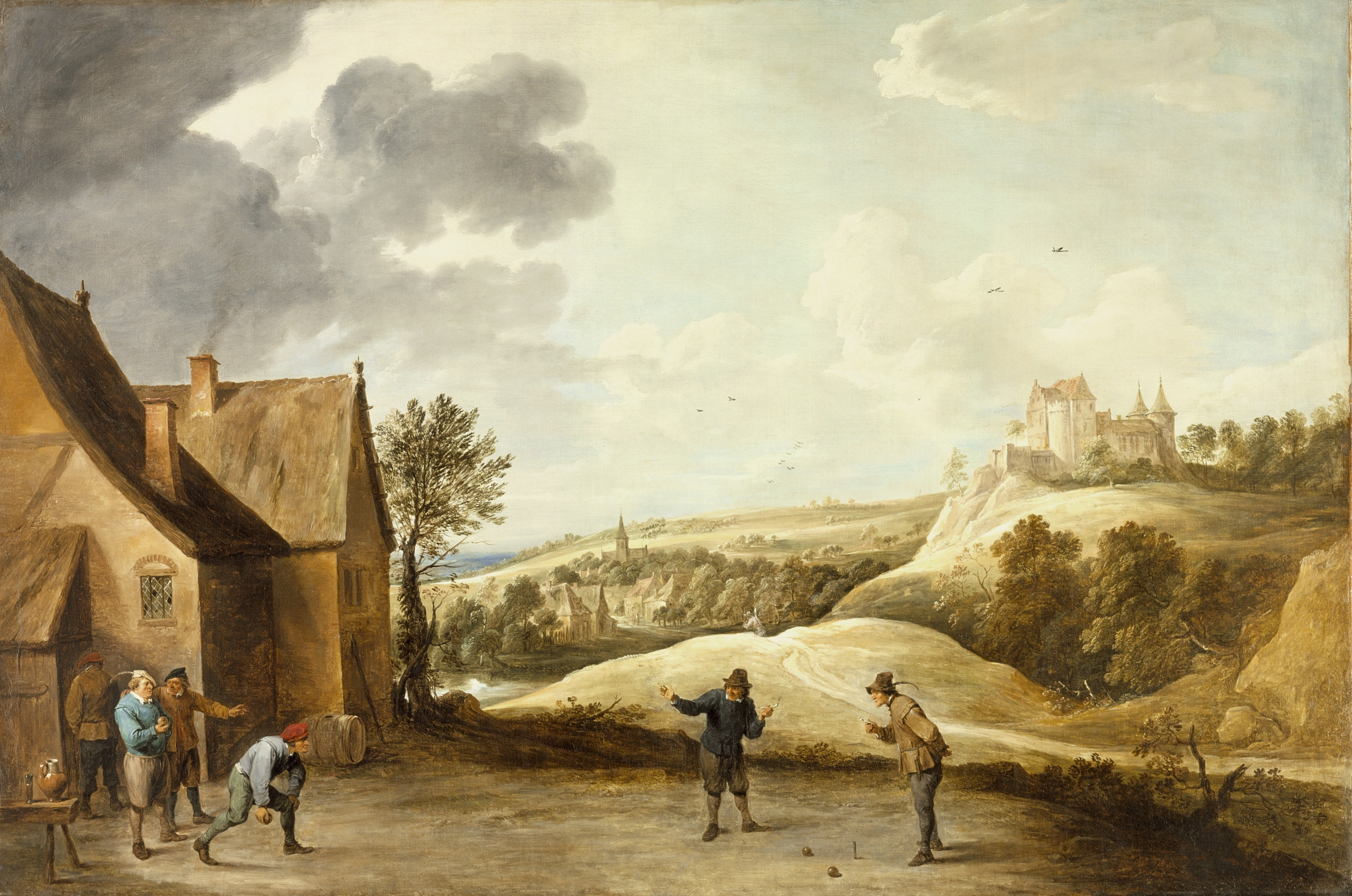
Landscape with peasants playing bowls outside an inn, c. 1660, oil on canvas

The personal style of Teniers was visible from the outset. An important distinction was that unlike Brouwer who placed these genre scenes mainly indoors, Teniers gradually moved his scenes into the open air and started to give the landscape a major place in his work from the 1640s. This was a common development in Flemish painting at the time. The smoky and monochrome tonality of the interiors from the 1630s was replaced by a luminous, silvery atmosphere, in which the peasants sit at their ease, conversing or playing cards. These paintings show a radical move towards a more positive attitude towards country life and the peasantry than was reflected in his earlier satirical pieces influenced by Brouwer.

Teniers's later works such as his Flemish kermesse (1652, Royal Museums of Fine Arts of Belgium, Brussels) breathe an idyllic Arcadian spirit. The peasant characters have lost their ungainly appearance and people from the higher social classes are now mixed in with the common people. The artist's new status as court painter of Archduke Leopold Wilhelm from 1651 may have contributed to this 'gentrification' of his work. This type of rural scene became very popular. In many of Teniers's late paintings, the excitement of his earlier peasant feasts is gradually replaced by tranquil scenes populated with only a few human figures. In this later period Teniers also adopted a more painterly and looser style.

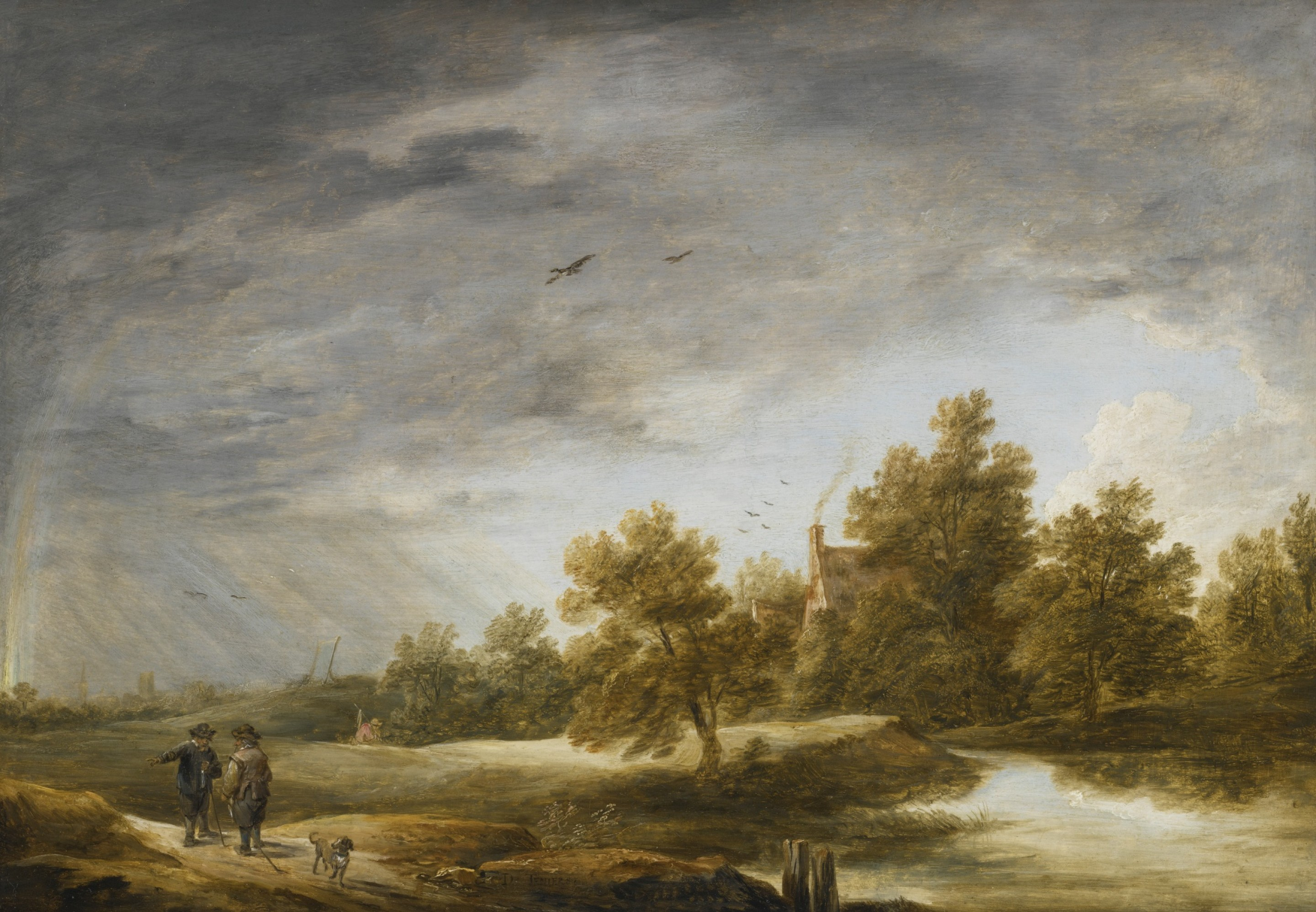
River landscape with rainbow, after 1644, oil on canvas

Teniers's scenes with peasants were so well known that compositions with this subject came to be called 'tenierkens' ('small teniers') and tapestries with peasant scenes were referred to as 'Teniers tapestries'. Teniers did not design any Teniers tapestries himself. Only a few of these tapestries can be directly linked to works by Teniers. Teniers tapestries were particularly popular from the last third of the 17th century and well into the 18th century. The Teniers tapestries were woven by many Brussels weavers and also in other centers such as Lille, Oudenaarde, Beauvais and Madrid.

=== Country and pastoral landscapes ===
In the early 1640s Teniers began to paint more landscape paintings and in these he developed his own pictorial language. He started to focus on the Flemish countryside as a subject in itself rather than solely as a backdrop to his outdoor peasant scenes. In his landscapes he paid particular attention to the variegated light of the Flemish countryside in different weather conditions. In his River landscape with rainbow he included thin, dark clouds, with streaking sun rays piercing through rain and a rainbow in the left background. Along with Rubens, Teniers was among the first Flemish 17th-century artists to include rainbows in his compositions, not for their religious or allegorical meaning, but rather as another means by which to showcase his careful study of nature. Other examples of this include other works from the mid-1640s such as The Reaping (Hermitage Museum). Teniers depicted real as well as imaginary landscapes. Although he did not intend these works to be topographically accurate, he spent a lot of time sketching in the countryside. This explains why certain motifs recur in his landscape oeuvre.

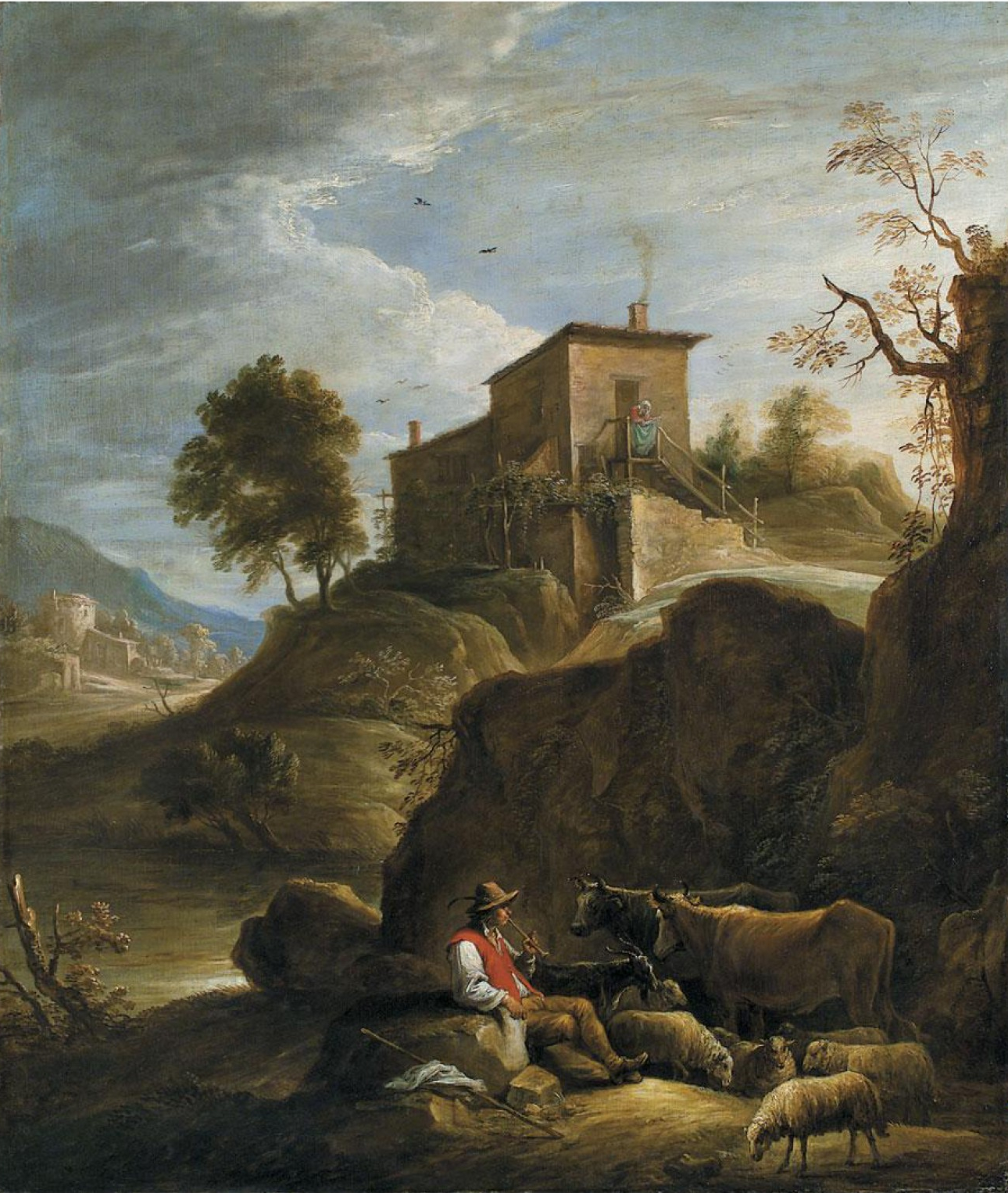
A pastoral landscape with a herdsman playing a pipe near a waterfall, 1660s, oil on canvas

In the 1660s Teniers started to paint pastoral scenes. It is likely that the increased prominence of rural life and nature in his work of that period was connected to his 1662 purchase of Drij Toren, a country house in Perk in which he maintained a studio. In contrast to the sophisticated compositions he painted as a court painter, the landscapes he painted at Perk stand out by their simplicity. They expressed an Arcadian view of life in the countryside and eulogized the advantages of a peaceful existence on the land. He presented the rural life as happy and carefree. The landscapes themselves were a combination of fantasy and reality. The Arcadian spirit was conveyed through stock motifs such as cattle and sheep, bridges and classical ruins on a hill as well as through the general tonality and style of these works.

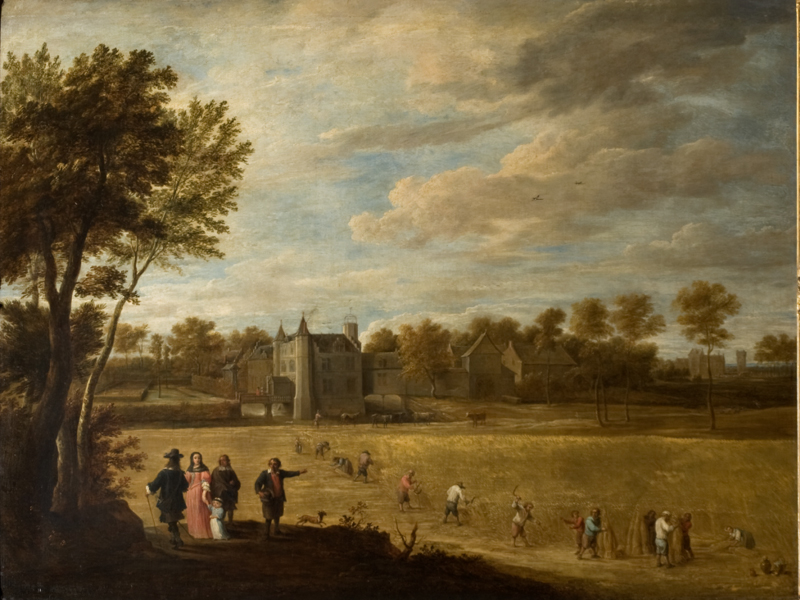
View of Drij Toren at Perk, with David Teniers' family, 1660s, oil on canvas

Teniers's interest in pastoral paintings has been linked to his ambition to be elevated to the nobility. Agriculture and animal husbandry were regarded as proper occupations of the nobility. An estate in the countryside was therefore a necessary part of the status of nobles of that time. Teniers had himself acquired the country estate Drij Toren in Perk near Rubens' country estate Het Steen. Teniers painted his own country estate several times. In the View of Drij Toren at Perk, with David Teniers' family (c. 1660, Boughton House) Teniers placed his estate in the center of the composition and included a portrait of his family, servants and tenant farmers at the harvest. He paid homage to Rubens by including Rubens' nearby estate called Het Steen in the far distance. He depicted himself in the picture as a country gentleman, who through his graceful bearing and costly clothing sets himself apart from the servants and toiling peasants in the picture. Teniers also made many paintings of other châteaux and estates. Only a few of the châteaux and estates he represented in these paintings are known. It is believed that they are imaginary creations intended to present a generic view of what a country estate should look like: large, stately and dominating the countryside around it. These paintings often include depictions of the tenant farmers who pay deference to their masters. They thus give expression to the prevalent worldview of the ruling class of his day, of which Teniers aspired to be a part, which was that the good and humble peasant would always show reverence to his noble lord.

=== Gallery paintings ===
Teniers painted 10 paintings representing the collection of the Archduke Leopold Wilhelm in Brussels. Of these only three are dated. Nine are painted on canvas and one on copper. The paintings are believed to depict a fictitious space rather than the actual location of the Archduke's collection in his Brussels palace. The paintings shown in them, however, are known to have formed part of the archducal collection.

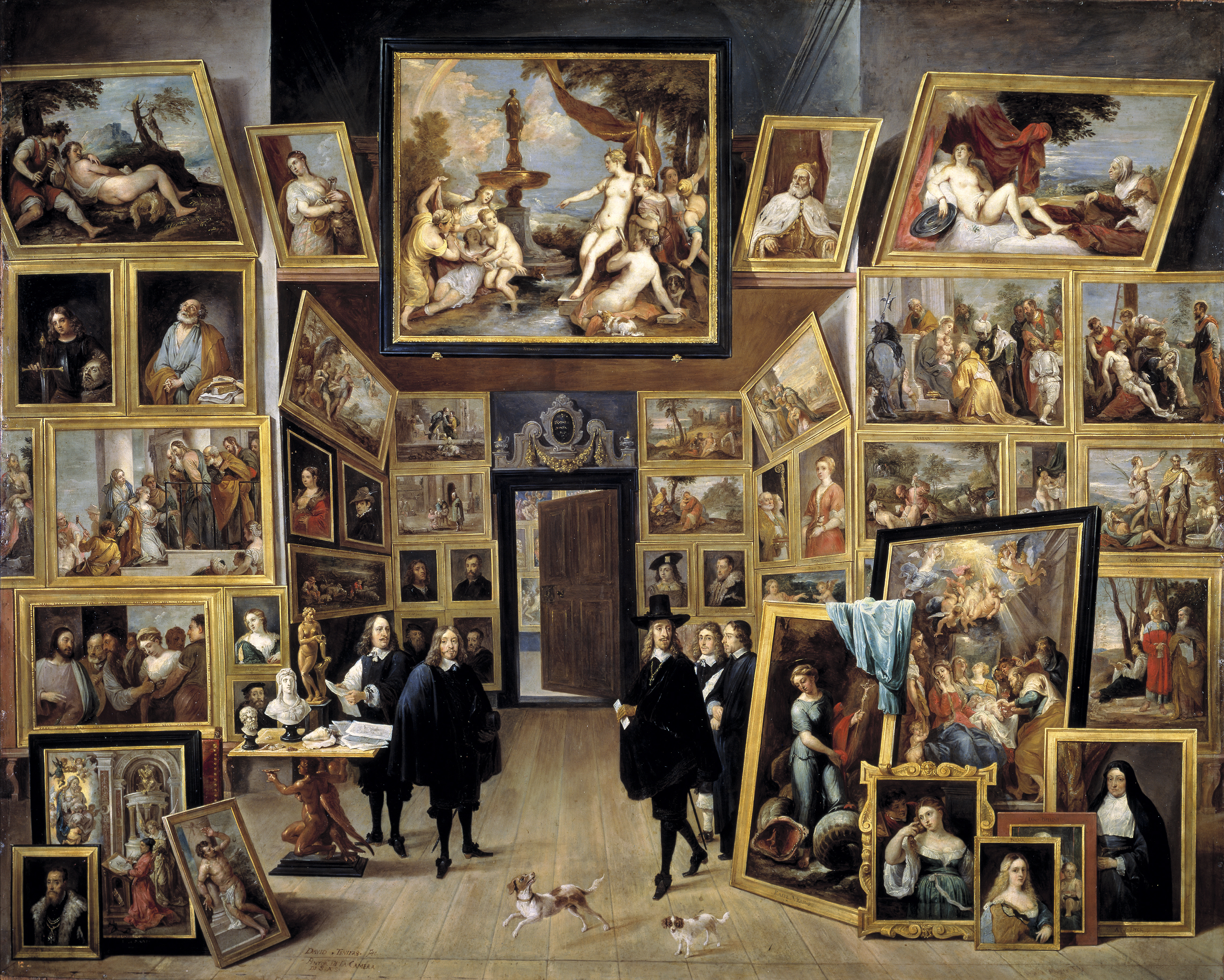
The Archduke Leopold Wilhelm in his Painting Gallery in Brussels, c. 1647–1651, oil on copper

Teniers's paintings of the Archduke's collection fall into a genre referred to as 'gallery paintings' or 'pictures of collections'. Gallery paintings typically depict large rooms in which many paintings and other precious items are displayed in elegant surroundings. Antwerp artists Jan Brueghel the Elder and Frans Francken the Younger were the first to create paintings of art and curiosity collections in the 1620s. The genre was further developed by Hieronymus Francken the Younger, Willem van Haecht and Hendrik Staben. The genre became immediately popular in Antwerp where many artists practised it in Teniers's time: they included artists such as Jan Brueghel the Younger, Cornelis de Baellieur, Hans Jordaens, Gonzales Coques, Jan van Kessel the Elder and Hieronymus Janssens. Later practitioners included Teniers's presumed pupil Gillis van Tilborgh as well as Wilhelm Schubert van Ehrenberg, Jacob de Formentrou and Balthasar van den Bossche.

Teniers played an important role in the development of the genre of gallery paintings and his mid-17th-century gallery paintings of the collection of Archduke Leopold Wilhelm are among the most famous examples of the genre. The earliest works in this genre depicted art objects together with other items such as scientific instruments or peculiar natural specimens. These paintings expressed the Early Modern culture of curiosity, in which art works and scientific instruments were mixed together in so-called cabinets of curiosities. The persons populating the galleries in these early works are 'virtuosi' who appear as keen to discuss scientific instruments as to admire an artwork. Teniers transformed the genre in the mid 17th century by moving away from the depiction of cabinets of curiosities to depicting art galleries, and in particular the collection of Archduke Leopold Wilhelm. In the final, 'late' phase of the genre from c. 1660 to 1690, artists such as Teniers's pupil Gillis van Tilborgh went further in removing non-art objects from the gallery and introduced figures in the gallery setting who claimed elite status by virtue of their knowledge of (and, as in some cases artists are present, ability to produce) art.

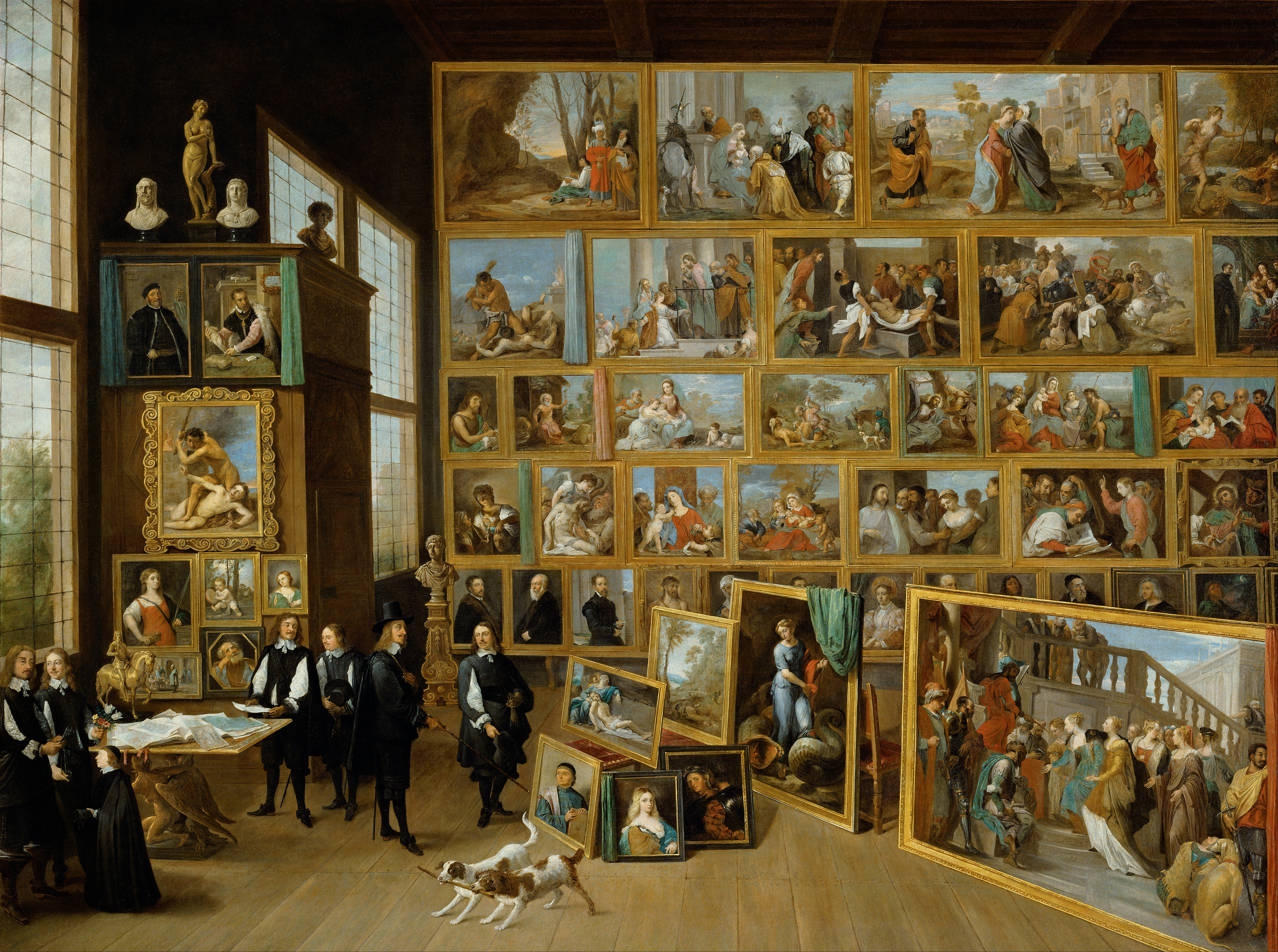
Archduke Leopold Wilhelm in his gallery in Brussels, 1650–52, oil on canvas

Teniers first depicted Archduke Leopold Wilhelm with his collection in two pictures dated 1651 (one in Petworth House and the other in the Royal Museums of Fine Arts of Belgium). The only other dated gallery painting by Teniers is dated 1653. The fact that the other gallery paintings of Teniers are not dated has made it difficult to establish a chronology and evolution of his work in this genre. Two of the ten known gallery paintings with Archduke Leopold Wilhelm have similar compositions and include the same paintings: the large, undated canvas in the Kunsthistorisches Museum likely followed the equally large painting dated 1651 in Petworth House. The others are all independently composed and display different works or when the same works are included they are hung in a different order. Although Teniers's gallery paintings depict pictures known to have been part of the Archduke's collection, the precise arrangements in which he depicted those pictures is believed to be fictional. Teniers strove in these paintings to arrive at a visual survey of the collection. Some of the paintings show the Archduke visiting the collection accompanied by courtiers and other art collectors. Teniers included in some a portrait of himself apparently in the act of providing his patron some explanation on a particular work of art in the collection. In the Archduke Leopold Willem in his gallery at Brussels (c. 1650, Kunsthistorisches Museum) Teniers included a portrait of Jan Anton van der Baren (the third man from the right) who later followed the Archduke upon his return to Vienna where he took over Teniers's role as director and cataloger of the Archduke's collection.

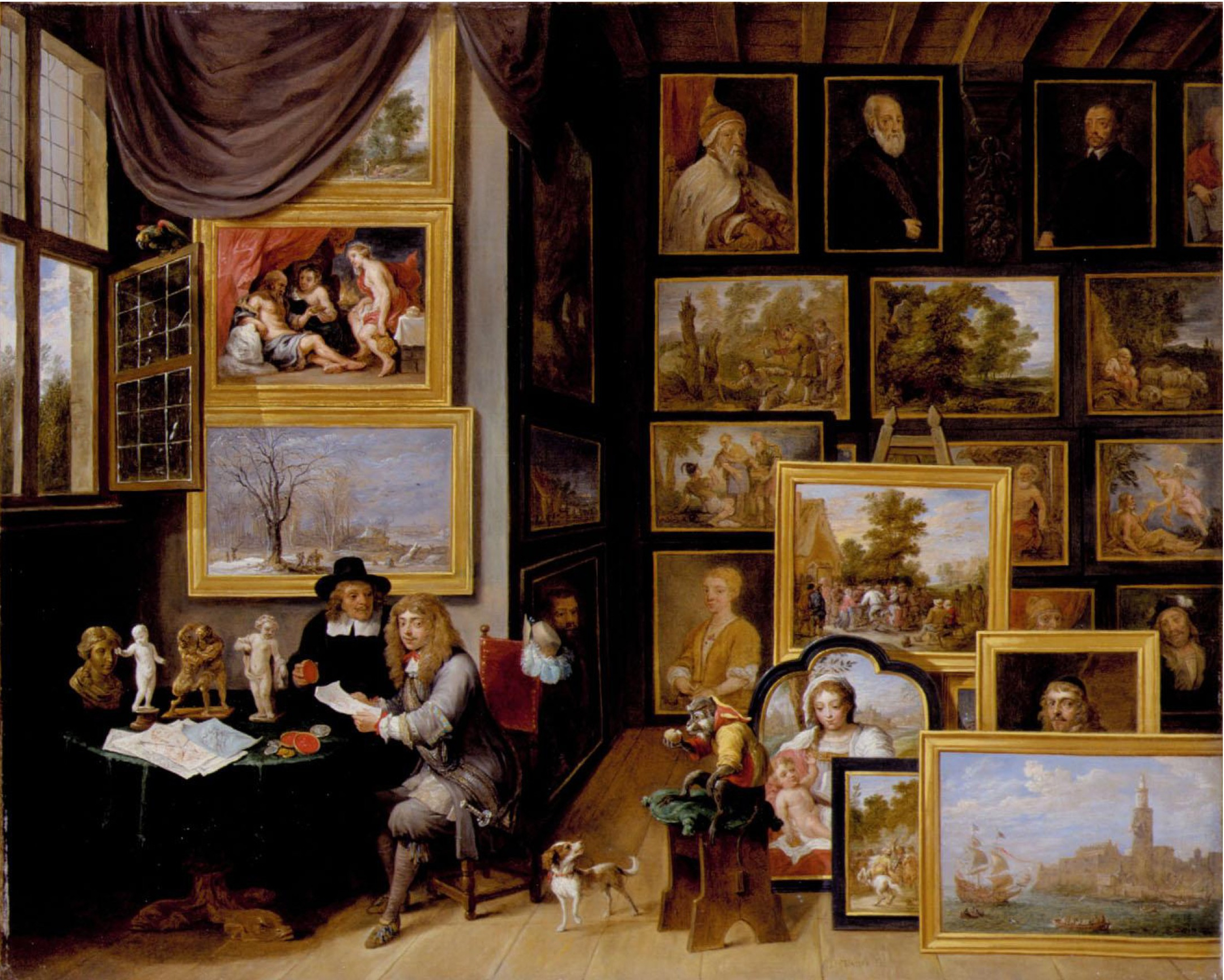
A picture gallery with two men examining a seal and a red chalk drawing, and a monkey present, oil on panel

It is likely that these gallery paintings of the Archduke's collection were painted to memorialize and eulogize it and anyone associated with it. The gallery painting with Archduke Leopold Wilhelm in Peftord House was made on copper. This was unusual for a picture of such a large size and was presumably done so that the Archduke could send it as a present to Philip IV of Spain. By sending this work to Philip IV, the Archduke may have intended to pay homage to his uncle as a prominent connoisseur of Italian painting known for his large collection at the Royal Alcazar of Madrid. His secondary intention may have been to demonstrate to the King that his collection in Brussels could emulate the King's collection in Madrid. As in the 17th century the power of a prince was no longer judged solely based on his military success, but even more so on his taste in, and appreciation of, art, the Archduke thus wanted to show that he could hold his own against the King.

Teniers also painted a few gallery paintings showing artists at work or cognoscenti inspecting a collection. An example is A picture gallery with two men examining a seal and a red chalk drawing, and a monkey present (At Sotheby's New York, 24 January 2002, lot 169). These gallery paintings are heavy with symbolism and allegory and are a reflection of the intellectual preoccupations of the age, including the cultivation of personal virtue and the importance of connoisseurship. They accentuate the notion that the powers of discernment associated with connoisseurship are socially superior to or more desirable than other forms of knowing. Teniers also created an allegorical or satirical interpretation of a gallery painting in the drawing Monkeys' Masquerade: The Painter’s Studio, an Artist Seated (British Museum). The drawing is clearly a pun on the popular 'art as the ape of nature' present in many pictures of collections through the inclusion of a monkey among the art lovers.

=== Theatrum pictorium ===
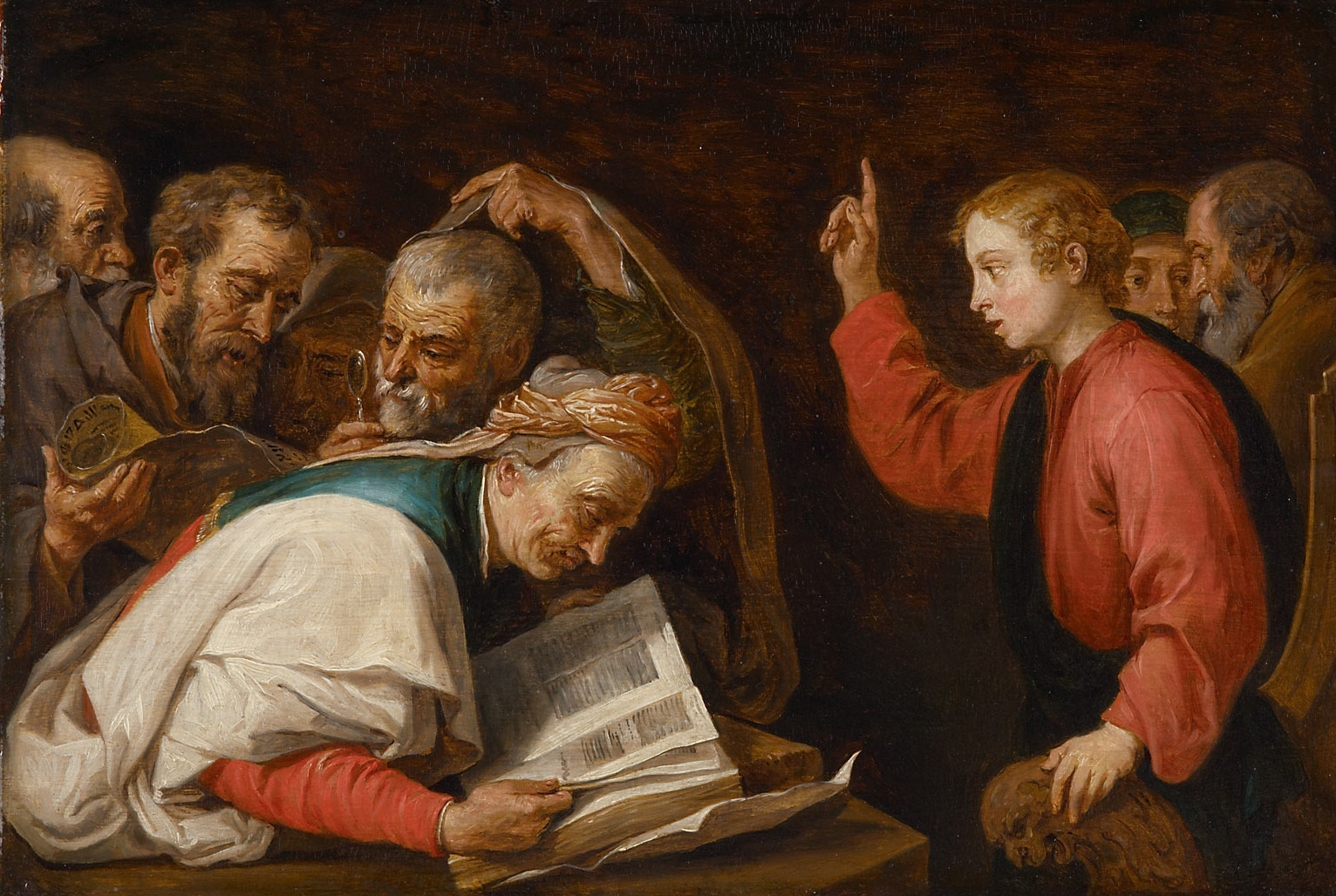
Jesus among the Doctors, modello by Teniers after Ribera c. 1651–1656, oil on panel

During his tenure as keeper of Archduke Leopold Wilhelm's collection, Teniers undertook the preparation and publication of the first ever illustrated catalog of old master paintings. His brother Abraham Teniers was involved in organizing the publication of the work. The first official publication of the work in bound book format was published by Hendrick Aertssens in Brussels in 1660 (although the title page states the date as 1658). The title page of the book refers to it as 'Hoc Amphiteatrum Picturarum' ('This amphitheatre of pictures'). The publication is now often referred to as Theatrum pictorium ('Theatre of Paintings'). The cover of the Theatrum pictorium contained a bust portrait of the Archduke with a dedication to the Archduke as well as introductions in Latin, French, Spanish and Dutch. The title page clarifies that Teniers funded the publication project out of his own pocket. The Theatrum pictorium was published in four languages (Latin, French, Dutch, and Spanish) and further editions appeared in 1673 and 1688 and in the 18th century. The last edition was published in 1755.

The publication comprised 246 engravings of important Italian paintings in the art collection of Archduke Leopold Wilhelm. While the project was initially planned to include the entire collection of the Archduke, the Archduke returned to Vienna before the project was completed. As a result, ultimately only a series of 246 plates was produced, of which 243 depicted about half of the Italian paintings then owned by the Archduke).

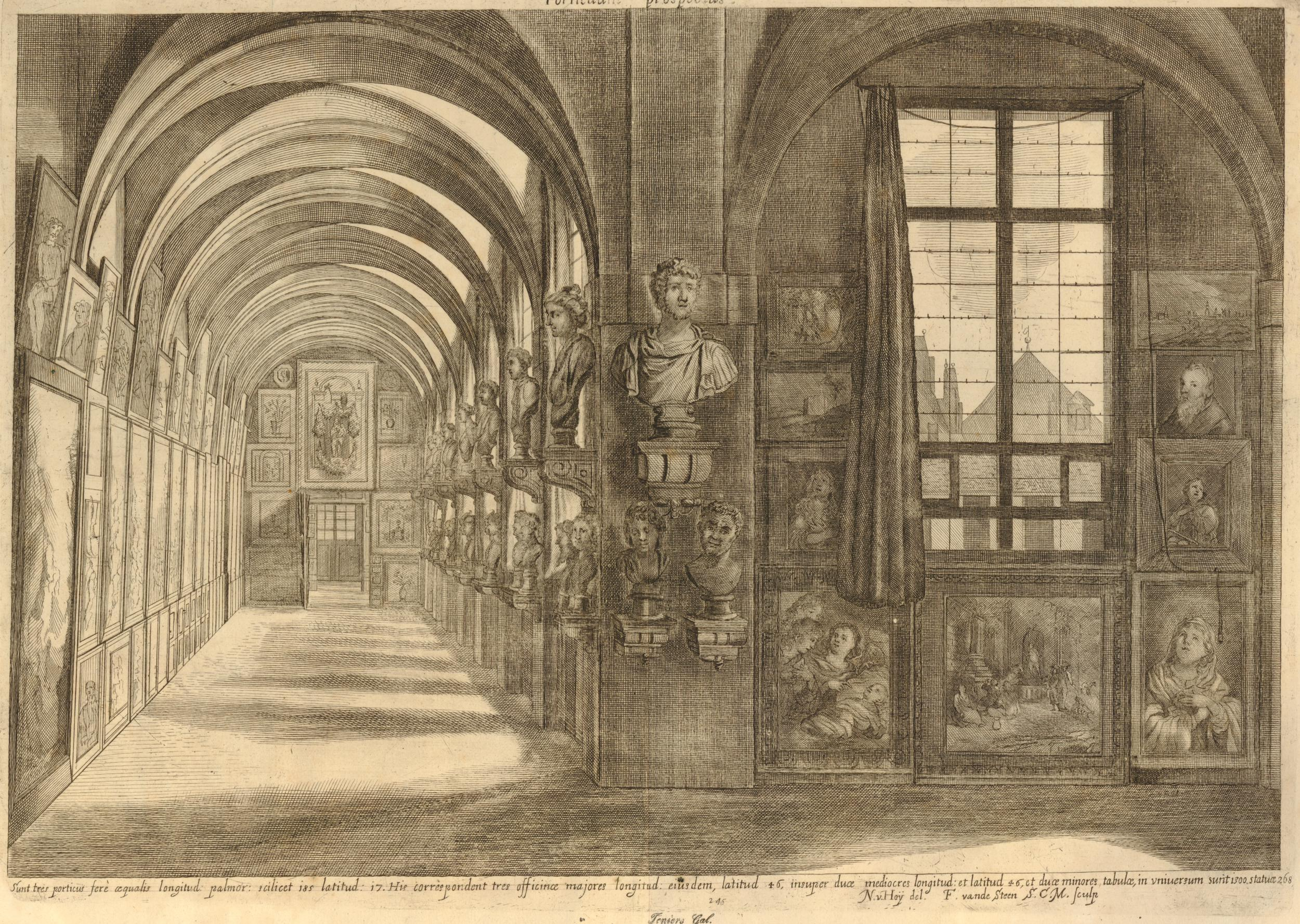
View into the picture gallery of the Archduke Leopold in Brussels, by Nikolaus van Hoy from Theatrum Pictorium, 1656–1660

In the preparation of this project, Teniers first painted reduced modelli after the original works on panels of roughly 17 by 25 in dimensions. These were then engraved on the same scale by a pool of 12 engravers. Teniers used full colour in the modelli, rather than grisaille. This could mean that he intended these reproductions to function as independent records of some of these Italian paintings in the Archduke's collection. From the many modelli, which have been preserved, it is obvious that Teniers's copies constitute a true record of the originals even while he left out details and painted them in his typical fluid and transparent manner. The engraving of the catalog by engravers who worked after the modelli, not the originals, was started by 1656. In the 17th century there existed no efficient method for inverting images. As a result, most of the prints in the catalog are reverse images of the originals. Each print gives the name of the author of the original work on the left hand side (indicated by the letter 'p' for 'pinxit', Latin for 'painted by') and the engraver of the print on the right hand side (indicated by the letter 's' for 'sculpsit', Latin for 'engraved by'). Some editions also indicated the original dimensions of the paintings.

Teniers's modelli and the Theatrum pictorium serve as a record for some important paintings the whereabouts of which are currently unknown. For instance, the modelli in the Metropolitan Museum of Art of the Old Age in Search of Youth attributed by Teniers to Correggio and the Adam and Eve after Padovanino are the most important records of these lost paintings.

The Theatrum Pictorium had an important impact on the manner in which collections were organised, appreciated and published and continued to be used as a reference book during the 18th century.

=== Singeries ===
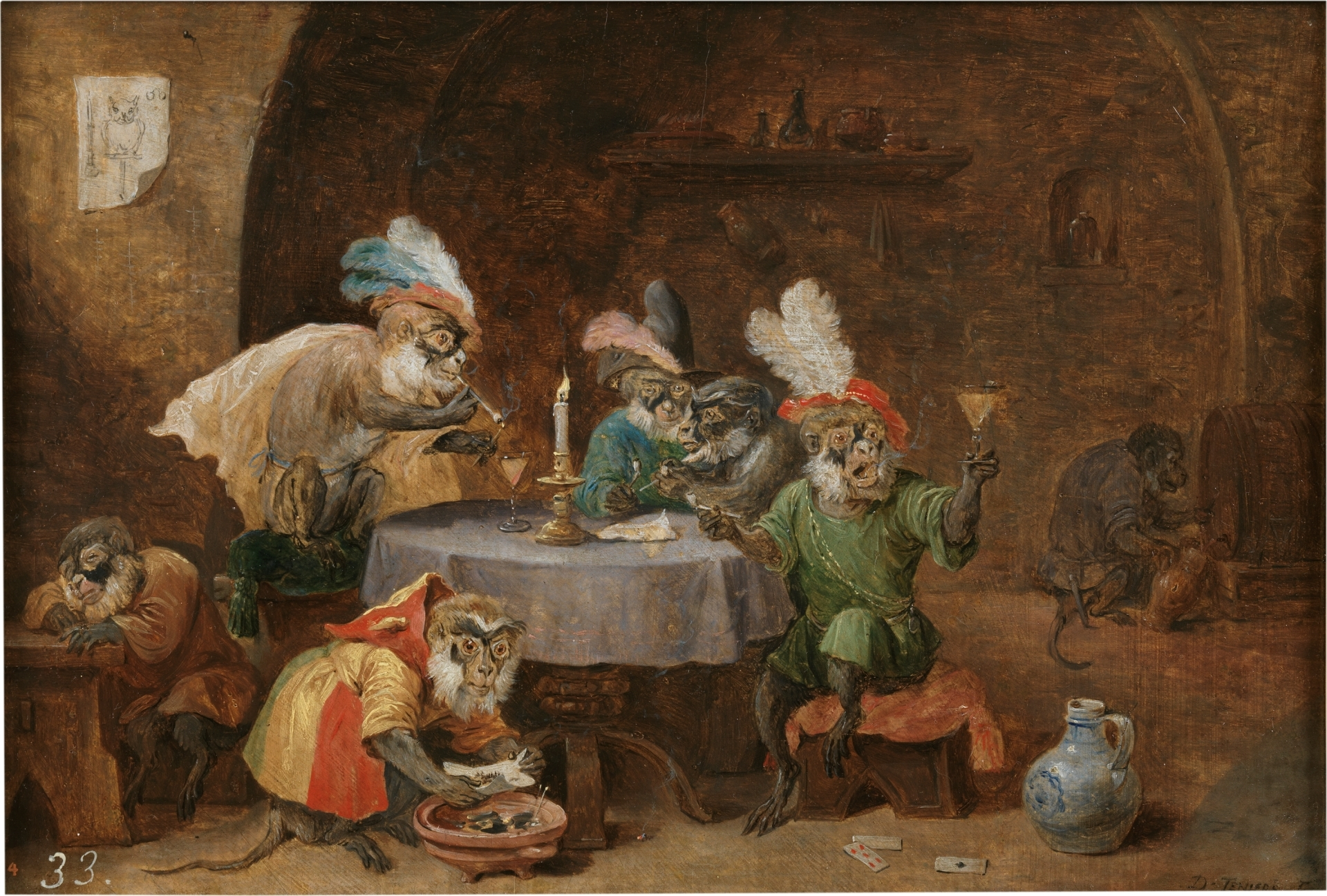
Smoking and drinking monkeys, c. 1660, oil on panel

Teniers contributed to the spread of the genre of the 'monkey scene', also called 'singerie' (which in French means a 'comical grimace, behaviour or trick' and is derived from 'singe', the French word for monkey). Comical scenes with monkeys appearing in human attire and a human environment are a pictorial genre that was initiated in Flemish painting in the 16th century and was subsequently further developed in the 17th century. Monkeys were regarded as shameless and impish creatures and excellent imitators of human behaviour. These depictions of monkeys enacting various human roles were a playful metaphor for all the folly in the world. In 16th century visual and literary sources, the image of the monkey was typically used to symbolise the unreasonable and foolish aspect of human nature. It is this quality that Teniers refers to in his Allegory of Vanitas (1633, private collection) in which he included a chained monkey in fool's clothes who is looking through a telescope from the wrong end. In addition, monkeys were associated with the Antichrist and the Devil and regarded as the opposite of god. In Dürer's print Madonna with a monkey the Virgin, who represents holiness, is contrasted with the monkey chained at her feet who symbolizes evil.

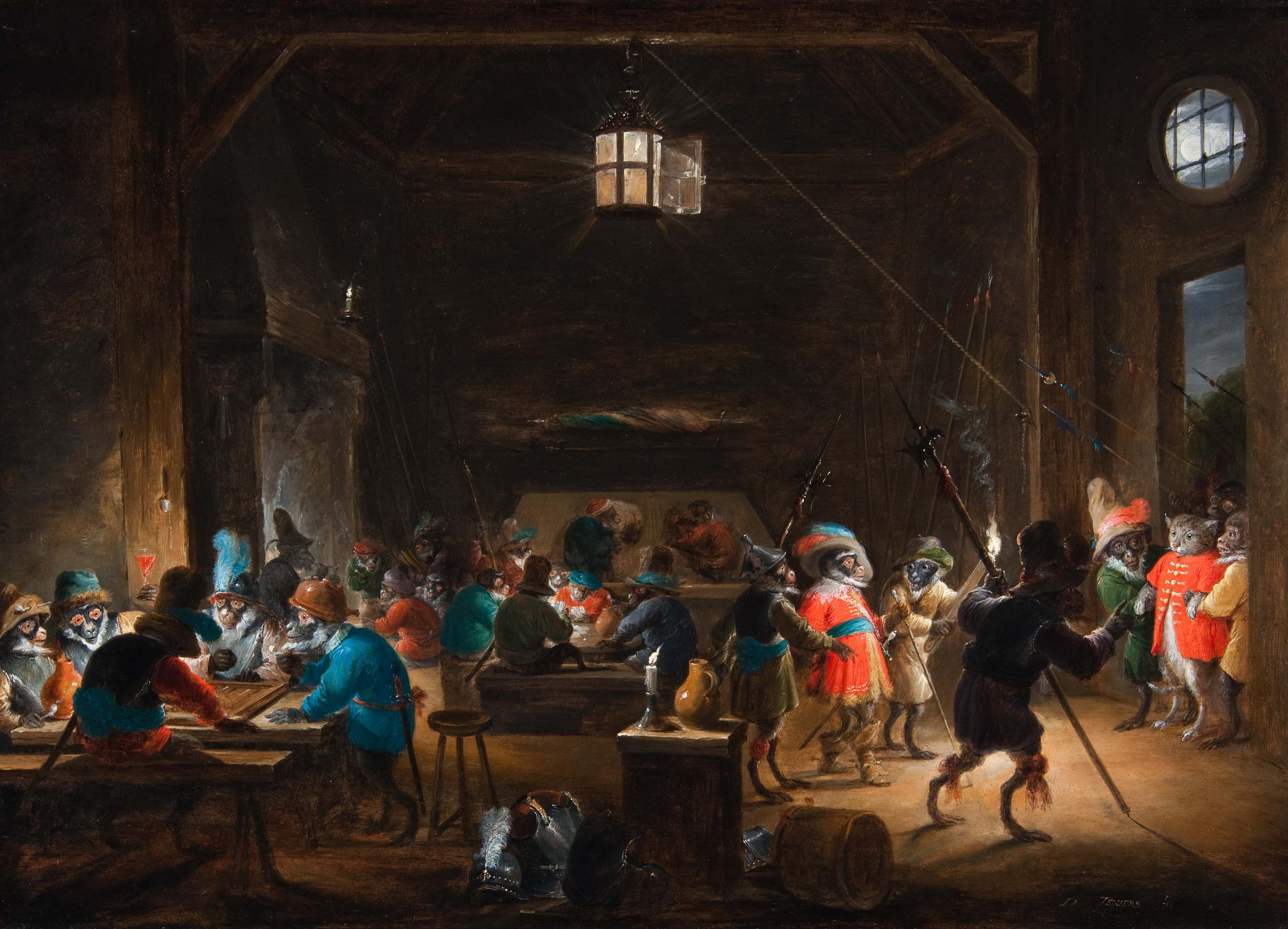
Guardroom with monkeys, c. 1633, oil on panel

The Flemish engraver Pieter van der Borcht the Elder introduced the singerie as an independent theme around 1575 in a series of prints, which were strongly embedded in the artistic tradition of Pieter Bruegel the Elder. These prints were widely disseminated and the theme was then picked up by other Flemish artists. The first one to do so was the Antwerp artist Frans Francken the Younger, who was quickly followed by Jan Brueghel the Elder, the Younger and Sebastiaen Vrancx. David Teniers the Younger, following in the footsteps of his father-in-law Jan Brueghel the Elder, became the principal practitioner of the genre and developed it further with his younger brother Abraham Teniers. The two brothers were able to cater to the prevailing taste in the art market and were thus instrumental in spreading the genre outside Flanders. Later in the 17th century Nicolaes van Verendael started to paint these 'monkey scenes' as well.

Teniers painted singeries in two distinctive periods. During the first period in the early 1630s he was still working in Antwerp. He returned to the subject in the 1660s when he was working in Brussels as the court painter of Archduke Leopold Wilhelm. In the early period Teniers's singeries typically depicted monkeys as soldiers. From this period dates his Festival of monkeys (1633, private collection). Monkey soldiers are shown enjoying themselves in front of a tent set up on what is likely a town square with a landscape in the distance. Food and wine are in abundant supply. On the tent is pinned an image of an owl with spectacles. The owl recalls the Flemish proverb 'wat baten kaars en bril als de uil niet zien en lezen wil' ('what good are candle and spectacles if the owl does not want to see and read'). The Festival of monkeys can be regarded as a criticism of the role of 'fools in high places'. Teniers evidently identified close with the singerie genre in this early period of his career as two monkey scenes – the Guardroom with monkeys and the Festival of monkeys – are reproduced in his self-portrait of 1635, known as The Artist in his studio (private collection, a workshop copy was sold at Sotheby's New York sale of 27 May 2004 as lot 16). The artist is shown sitting in front of an easel holding his brush and palette. In an exceptions combination of the genre of artist studio and gallery painting, some young connoisseurs are visiting the artist's studio and are examining some of his works.

=== Guardroom scenes ===
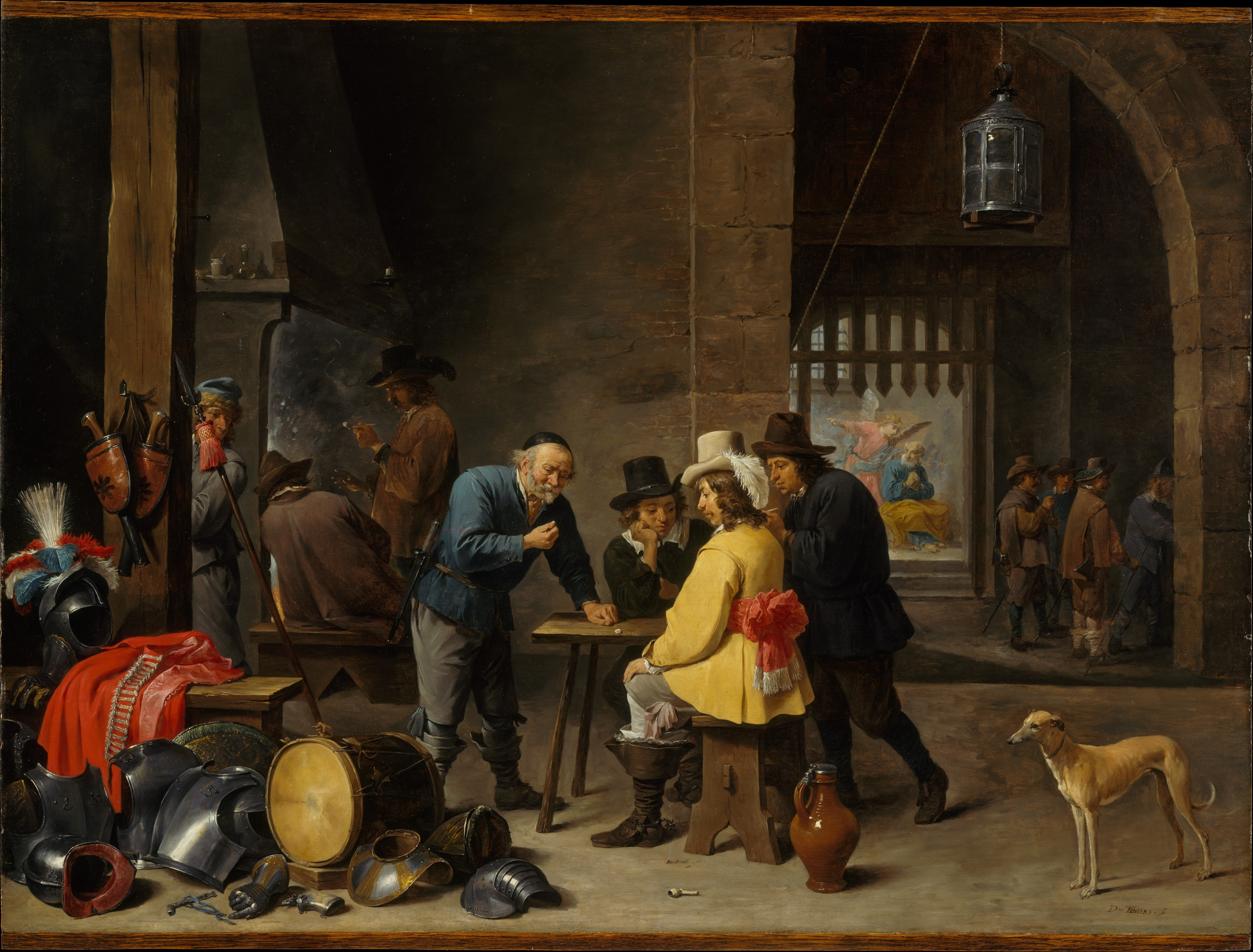
Guardroom with the Deliverance of Saint Peter, c. 1645, oil on panel

Teniers painted several guardroom scenes or corps de garde such as The Sentinel (1642). A guardroom scene is a type of genre scene that became popular in the mid-17th century, particularly in the Dutch Republic. In Flanders Teniers was one of the principal practitioners of the genre together with his brother Abraham, Anton Goubau, Cornelis Mahu and Jan Baptist Tijssens the Younger.

A guardroom scene typically depicts an interior scene with officers and soldiers engaged in merrymaking. Guardroom scenes often included mercenaries and prostitutes dividing booty, harassing captives or indulging in other forms of reprehensible activities. Many of Tenier's guardroom interiors date to the mid-1640s and are painted on copper. The subject of the guardroom and its contents such as armor, colorful flags and banners, saddles, drums, pistols allowed Teniers to showcase his brilliance as a still life painter. Teniers also used the subject to demonstrate his ability to use light to achieve a perfect representation of the quality of painted objects.

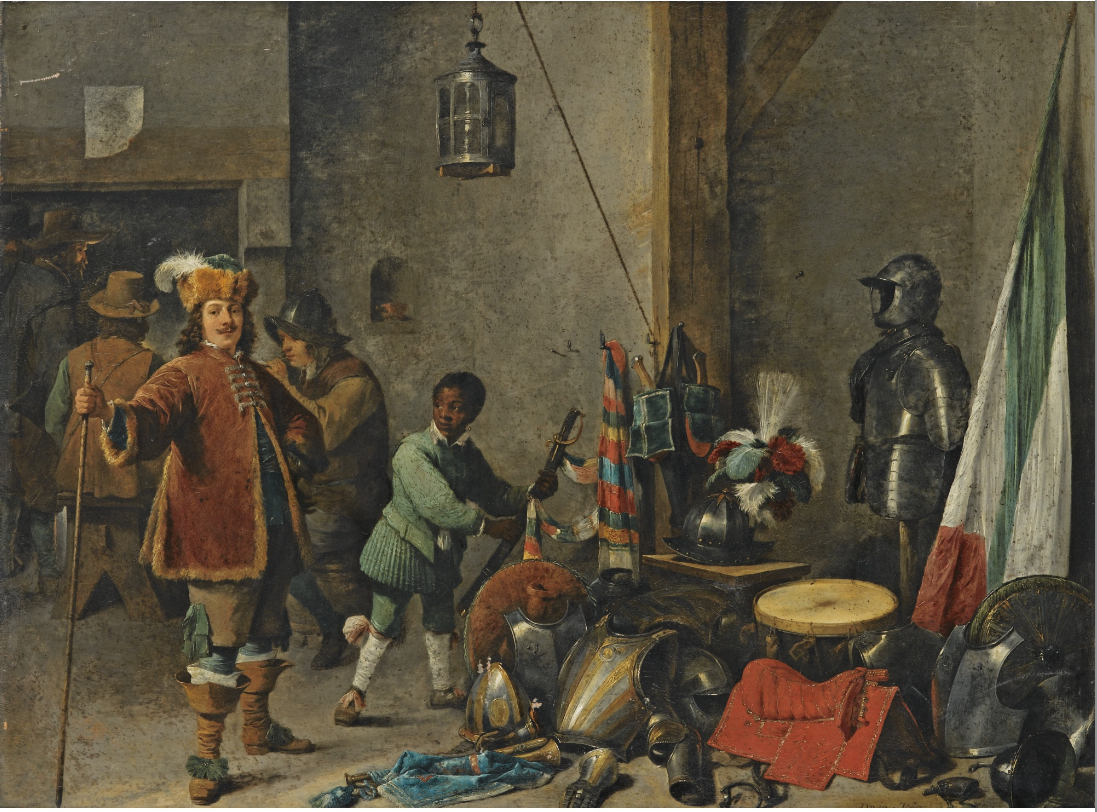
A guardroom with a self-portrait of the artist, 1640s, oil on copper

The armour depicted in the guardroom pictures was already out of date at the time it was painted since metal armours, breast plates and helmets fell out of use from the 1620s. It is possible that in line with the moralizing intent of the genre, the armour is a reference to the vanitas motif of the transience of power and fame.

In one of his guardroom interiors referred to as A guardroom with a self-portrait of the artist (At Sotheby's London sale of 7 July 2010, lot 12) Teniers included his own portrait at about 36 years of age. The artist has dossed himself out as an officer wearing an exotic fur-trimmed coat and a fur hat with plume. This self-portrait within this picture may have been intended as a tronie, which often depicted a stock character in an exotic costume. Teniers combined the genres of singerie and guardroom scene in the composition Guardroom with monkeys (Private collection). At a first glance, the Guardroom with Monkeys is no different from other guardroom scenes. It is clear from the round moon above the door that the scene is set late at night. The off-duty monkeys have removed their armor, stowed their pikes and rolled up their company flag and placed it against the far wall. Like their human counterparts, the monkey soldiers are loitering about, some of them are drinking and smoking, others are playing games. At the door a cat wearing respectable civilian clothes is led into the room by two monkeys who restrain it. The contrast between the properly dressed cat and the bizarre outfit of the monkey soldiers, one of which is wearing a funnel on his head while another has an upturned pot on his head, raises doubt as to the legitimacy of the monkeys' authority. As was customary in singeries, the dress and behaviour of the monkeys highlight the foolishness of human undertakings. Teniers may also have intended to criticize the bloated military in the Southern Netherlands in the 1630s.

=== Physicians and alchemists ===
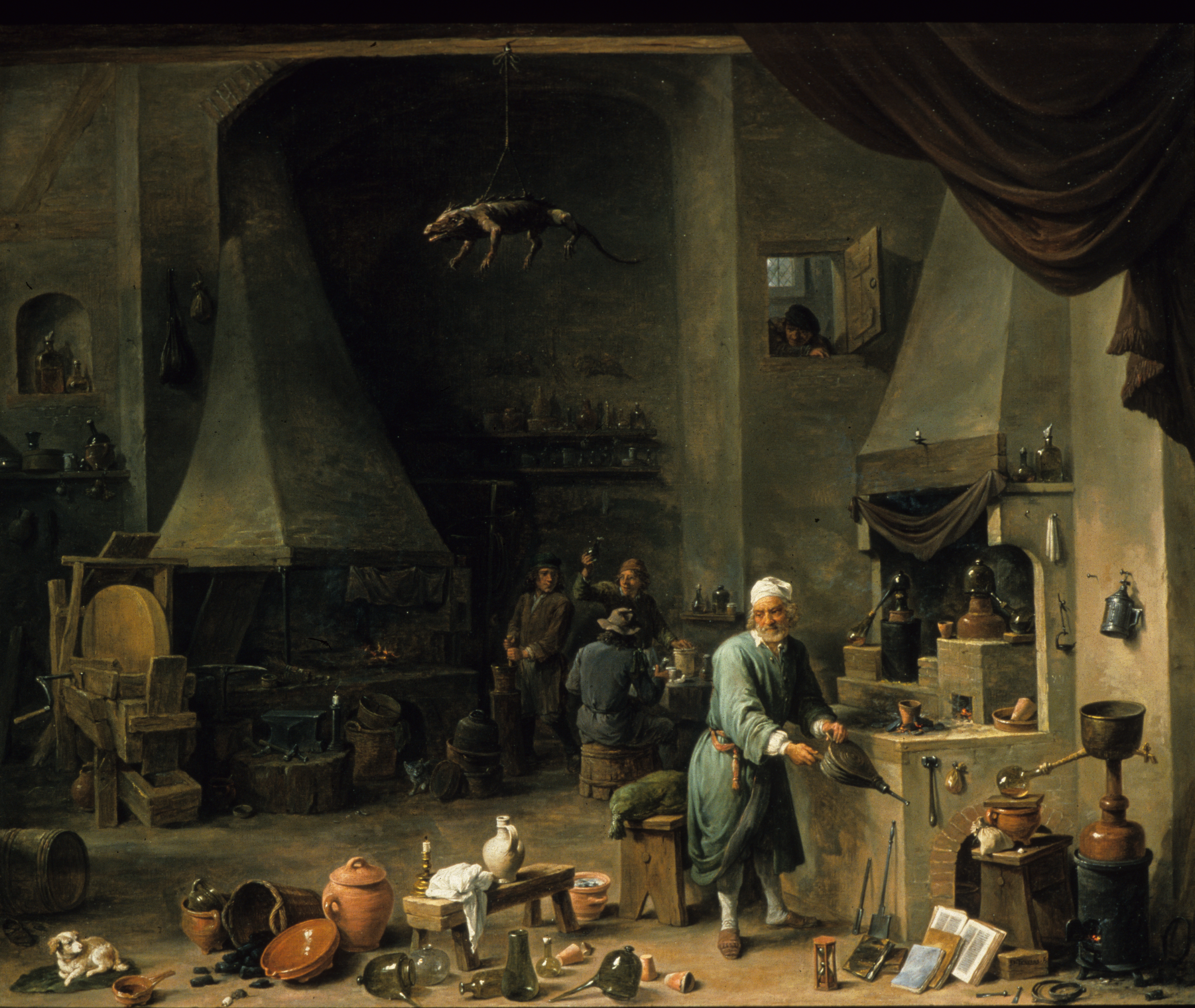
An alchemist in his laboratory, oil on canvas

The theme of physicians and alchemists was popular in 17th century Flemish and Dutch genre painting. Teniers was the principal contributor to this genre and its iconography in Flanders. The view of the public towards practitioners of either craft was ambivalent. Physicians and alchemists were regarded either as quacks or charlatans using deception to seek material gain or as persons seriously committed to the pursuit of knowledge. The ambivalence of this attitude was reflected in the artistic representations of physicians and alchemists. The first approach was to satirise the alchemist and turn him into a symbol of human folly. The artists would stress that the alchemist's research into creating gold from base metals was solely driven by a sinful pursuit of personal gain. Symbolism was used to show that alchemists were wasting precious time and money, and in the process sacrificed the well-being of their families. In his famous drawing of an alchemist dated to 1558 (Kupferstichkabinett Berlin) Pieter Brueghel the Elder depicted the alchemist as recklessly extravagant and wasteful in the use of resources. This drawing set the standard for the imagery of alchemists that was adopted by 17th century artists such as Jan Steen, David Rijckaert III and Adriaen van Ostade. In the 1640s Teniers created the second imagery of the alchemist. Teniers portrayed the alchemist as a learned and humble scientist diligently pursuing his research in his laboratory crowded with instruments. In the laboratory one or two assistants typically assist the alchemist with the performance of an experiment. Teniers's Alchemist (between circa 1640 and circa 1650, Mauritshuis) is an example of one of his alchemist laboratory scenes, which is devoid of the symbols of self-deception and consequent misery that Breughel had associated with alchemy, such as empty purses or tearful families. Teniers's new way of depicting alchemists was followed by contemporary artists such as Thomas Wijck, Frans van Mieris the Elder, Jacob Toorenvliet and Cornelis Bega.

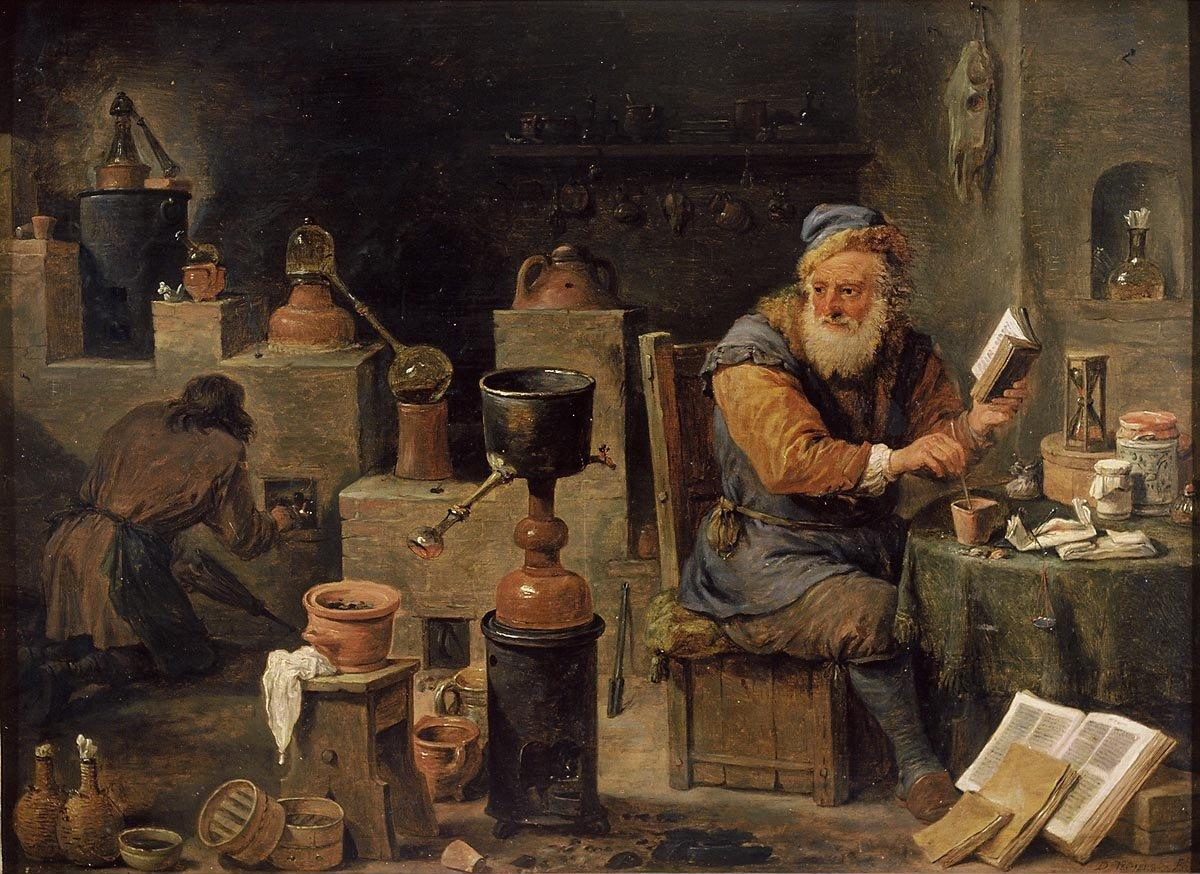
The alchemist, c. 1650, oil on panel

While alchemists were mainly concerned with transmutation of base metals into more noble ones, their endeavors were wider and also involved the use of their techniques to diagnose or cure people (the so-called 'iatrochemistry', which aimed to provide chemical solutions to diseases and medical ailments). There was therefore an overlap with the role of physicians. One of the popular methods of medical diagnosis was the so-called 'uroscopy', the analysis of the urine of a patient. Whereas this was considered a valid diagnostic method in the Middle Ages its validity had come under attack by more modern-minded physicians in the 17th century. The practice of uroscopy and the questions surrounding its use by medical practitioners were the impetus for genre paintings on the theme of the 'piskijker' ('pee examiner'). They typically showed the inspection by a physician or a quack of a flask of urine provided by a young woman. If the inspection revealed the image of a fetus this was proof that the woman was pregnant. It is assumed that the genre was started by Adriaen Brouwer and that a now lost work of Brouwer inspired Teniers and Gerard ter Borch to paint works in this genre.

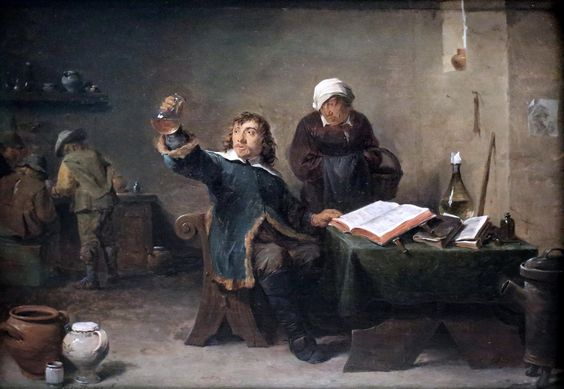
Village doctor examining a urine flask, 1645, oil on panel

An example of Teniers's contribution to the genre is the composition Village doctor looking at a urine sample (1640s, Royal Museums of Fine Arts of Belgium), which shows a man examining a urine flask for the purpose of medical diagnosis while an anxious peasant woman is looking on. Teniers also depicted physicians performing various operations such as foot and back operations.

=== Still lifes ===
Teniers is not generally known as a still life painter. Nevertheless, many of his interiors include elaborate still lifes, some of them painted by specialist still life painters, others painted by Teniers himself. The subject of the guardroom and all its trappings such as armor, colorful flags and banners, saddles, drums and pistols gave Teniers ample opportunity to showcase his capabilities as a still life painter. This can be seen in the Guardroom with the Deliverance of Saint Peter (c. 1645–47, Metropolitan Museum of Art).

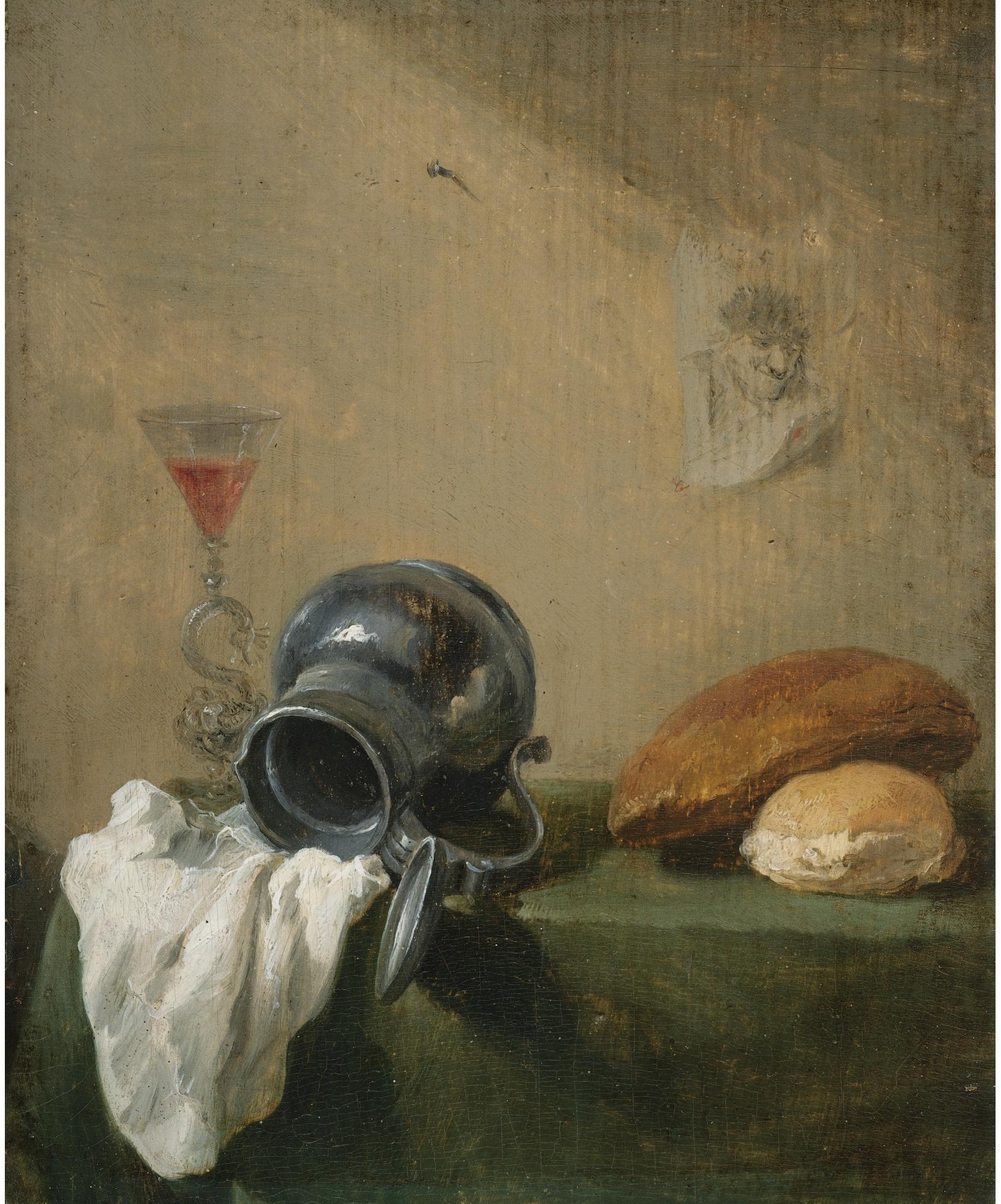
Still-life with overturned jug, 1635, oil on panel

A few independent still life paintings have also been attributed to Teniers. One of the most accomplished ones of these is the Still-life with overturned jug (At Sotheby's on 5 December 2007, lot 5).The work is dated to the mid-1630s on stylistic grounds. This work seems to show the influence of the Dutch monochrome still life painters. In particular, its simplicity and studied informality and the use of subtle muted colours bring to mind the work of contemporary artists from Leiden and Haarlem. However, is not clear whether Teniers was in fact directly influenced by these artists, and if so how. No similar still life paintings are known in Antwerp at this early date. At the time Teniers created this still life painting, the principal influence on him was Adriaen Brouwer, who had returned from Haarlem to Antwerp around 1631–2. To date Brouwer is not known to have been active as a painter of still lifes. While Teniers's early work also reveals his knowledge of Dutch artists in Rotterdam such as Pieter de Bloot and the Saftleven brothers, none of these artists were still life painters. The still life may possibly reflect the influence of the important Dutch still life painter Jan Davidsz. de Heem, who had arrived in Antwerp in 1635, the year this picture was made.

=== Collaborations ===
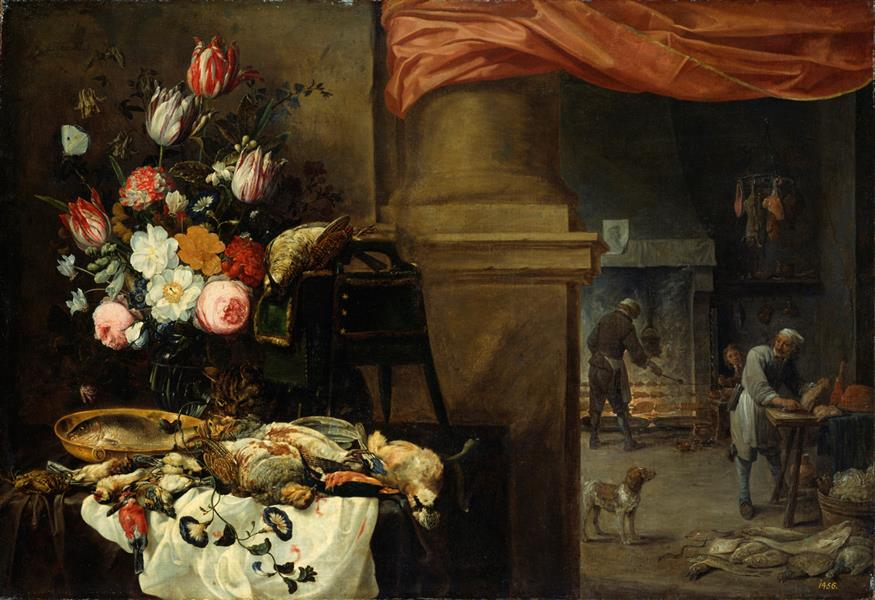
Kitchen still life with a vase of flowers, dead birds, a fish and a cat, with Nicolaes van Verendael and Carstian Luyckx, c. 1670, oil on canvas

Collaboration between artists specialized in distinctive genres was a defining feature of artistic practice in 17th-century Antwerp. Teniers was likewise a frequent collaborator with fellow artists. His collaborators included Lucas van Uden, Jan Davidsz. de Heem, Adriaen van Utrecht, Jacques d'Arthois, his nephew Jan van Kessel the Younger and Gualterus Gysaerts.

An example of such a collaboration is the Kitchen still life with a vase of flowers, dead birds, a fish and a cat, which depicts a kitchen in which two men appear to be roasting meat and fish. The left foreground of the painting is dominated by a bouquet of flowers and a still life of game; which were painted by Antwerp still life specialists Nicolaes van Verendael and Carstian Luyckx.

Teniers collaborated on a series of twenty copper panels commissioned by two members of the Moncada family, a noble Catalan family. The panels illustrate the deeds of Guillermo Ramón Moncada and Antonio Moncada, two brothers from the Moncada House who lived at the end of the 14th and beginning of the 15th century in Sicily. Five prominent Flemish artists collaborated on the panels. Of 12 scenes devoted to Guillermo Ramón Moncada, Willem van Herp painted six, Luigi Primo five and Adam Frans van der Meulen one. Teniers was responsible for all eight panels describing the deeds of Antonio Moncada. He painted them not long after the first part of the series had been finished. Jan van Kessel the Elder, a nephew of Teniers and a still life specialist, realised the decorative borders framing each episode.

=== Garland paintings ===
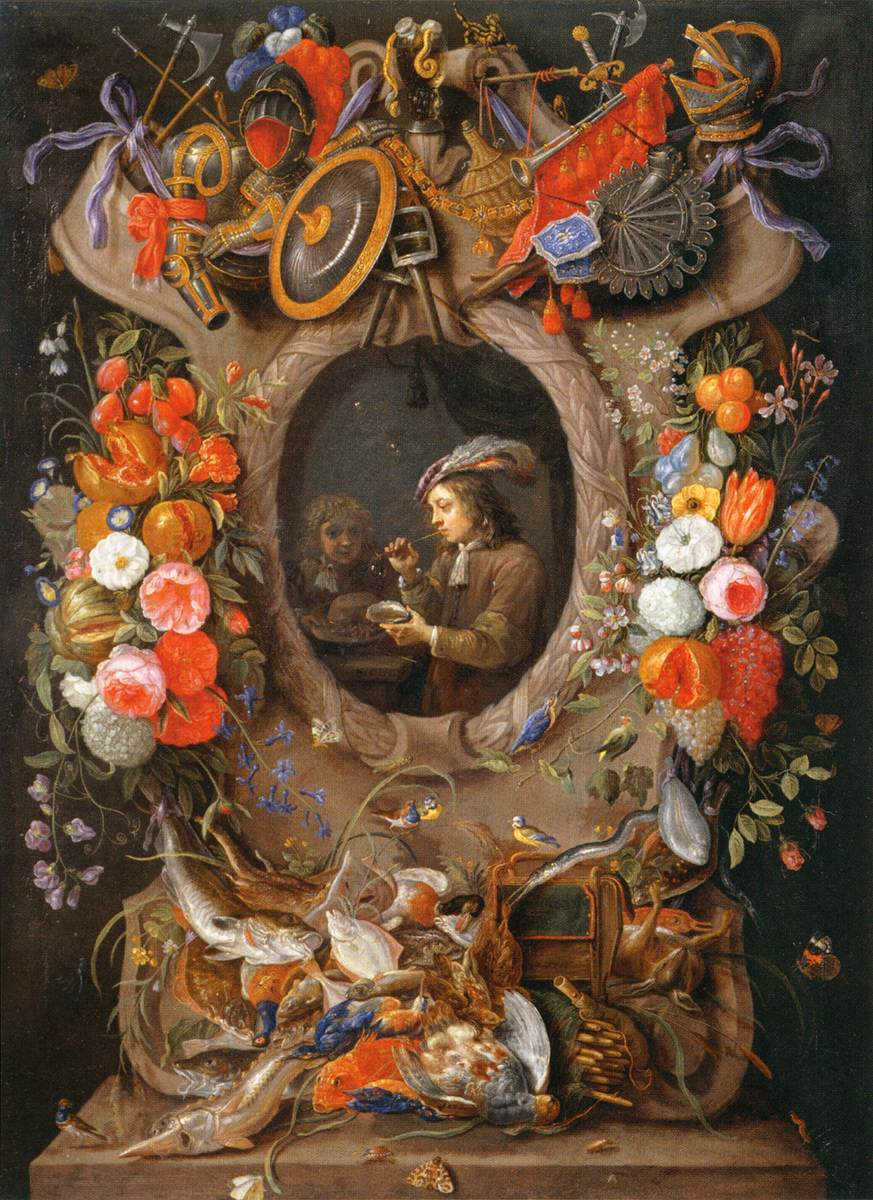
The Soap Bubbles, c. 1660–1670, oil on canvas

Another example of a collaborative painting made by Teniers is the composition The Soap Bubbles (c. 1660–1670, Louvre). In this work Teniers collaborated again with his nephew Jan van Kessel the Elder who painted a decorative garland representing the four elements around a cartouche showing a young man blowing soap bubbles, which was painted by Teniers. The young man blowing bubbles and the elements in the garland surrounding him such as the flowers, the dead fish and the armor and flags are all references to the theme of vanitas, i.e. the transience of life and the worthless nature of all earthly goods and pursuits.

This type of painting belongs to the genre of the 'garland painting', which was invented and developed by Teniers's father-in-law Jan Brueghel the Elder in the first two decades of the 17th century. Garland paintings typically show a flower garland around a devotional image or portrait. Other artists involved in the early development of the genre included Hendrick van Balen, Andries Danielsz., Peter Paul Rubens and Daniel Seghers. The genre was initially connected to the visual imagery of the Counter-Reformation movement. The genre was further inspired by the cult of veneration and devotion to Mary prevalent at the Habsburg court (then the rulers over the Southern Netherlands) and in Antwerp generally. The earliest specimens of the genre often include a devotional image of Mary in the cartouche but in later examples the image in the cartouche could be religious as well as secular as is the case of Teniers's The Soap Bubbles.

In 1676 Teniers collaborated with his nephew or cousin Gualterus Gysaerts, a still life painter, on a series of 19 garland paintings depicting the martyrs of Gorkum. The series was made for the Minorite Church in Mechelen following the beatification of the martyrs on 9 July 1676. Teniers painted the monochrome bust portrait of each martyr in a cartouche while Gysaerts painted the cartouche and the flower garland surrounding it. Of these paintings, eight are known still to exist, one of which, depicting the martyr Hieronymus van Weert, is in the Rijksmuseum. Both Gysaerts and Teniers signed the painting in the Rijksmuseum.

== Influence ==
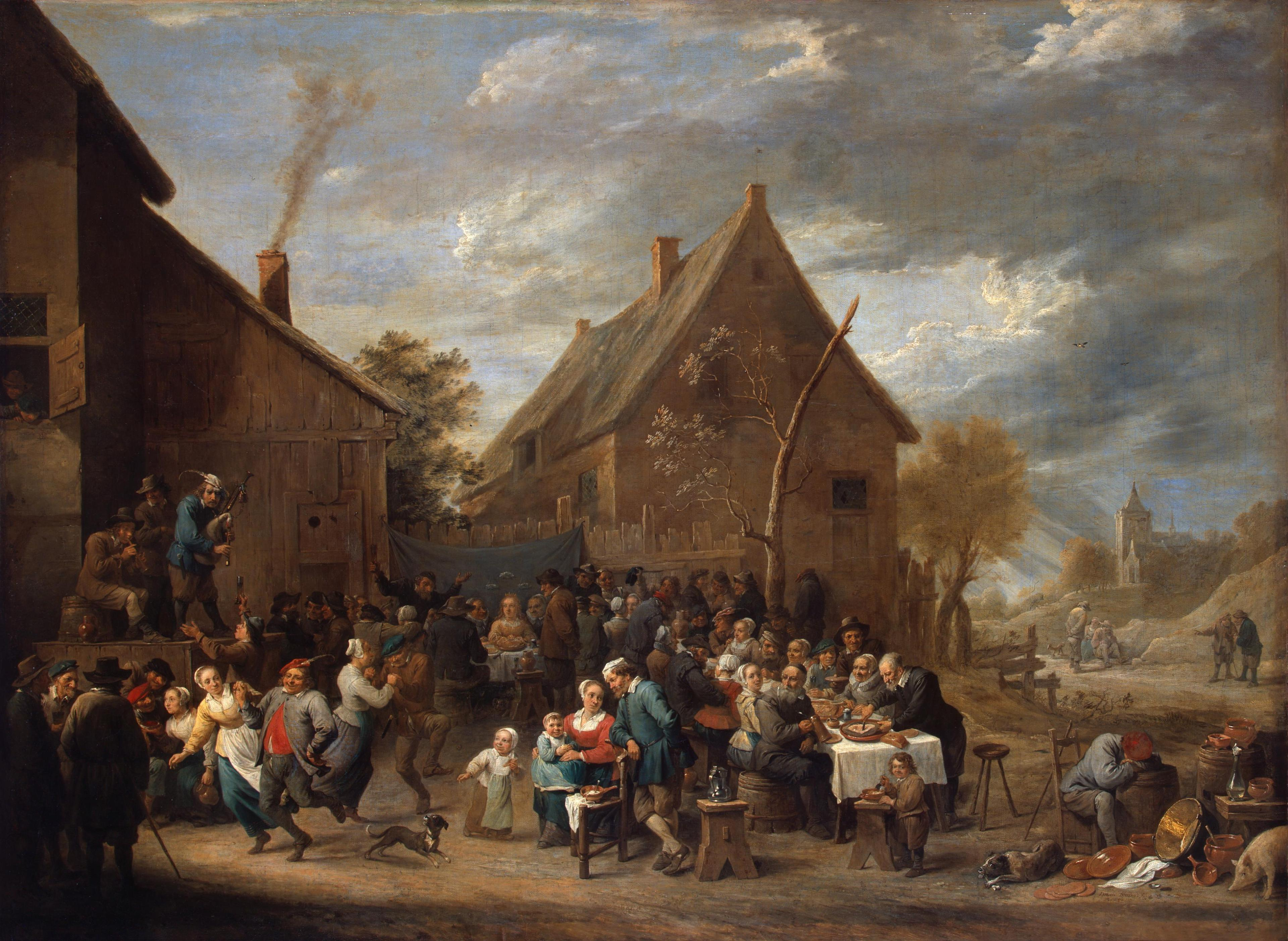
Peasant Wedding, 1650, oil on canvas

Teniers's genre paintings were influential on northern painters of the 17th century. His work was easily accessible to other artists as he was one of the most reproduced artists of his time and prints after his work were produced in large quantities. In Flanders he influenced his pupil Gillis van Tilborgh and David Rijckaert III. In the Dutch Republic Thomas Wijck, Frans van Mieris the Elder, Jacob Toorenvliet and Cornelis Bega were influenced by his scenes of alchemists.

In the 18th century, Parisian collectors eagerly competed to lay their hands on Teniers's works. They knew the artist chiefly for his idealized scenes of rural life, paintings of village feasts, interiors with peasants and guardroom scenes. Teniers's work was very much admired by French painters of that time, particularly Antoine Watteau. Without Teniers's influence it is unlikely that Watteau would have developed his typical style and subjects. In particular the village feasts of Teniers had shown the way for Watteau in the development of his fêtes galantes, which featured figures in ball dress or masquerade costumes disporting themselves amorously in parkland settings. In the 18th century, Watteau was commonly described as the 'French Teniers', thus showing that the comparison between the two artists contributed to Watteau's success. Other French painters of this time who were influenced by Teniers include Jean-Baptiste-Siméon Chardin, Étienne Jeaurat and Jean-Baptiste Greuze. Some art historians see a direct link between Teniers's A cobbler in his workshop and Chardin's Canary based on thematic as well as compositional similarities.

== Ancestry ==
Brueghel family tree

Pieter Bruegel the Elder
Pieter Brueghel the Younger	Jan Brueghel the Elder
Ambrosius Brueghel	Jan Brueghel the Younger	Anna Brueghel x David Teniers the Younger	Paschasia Brueghel	Hieronymous van Kessel the Younger
Jan Pieter Brueghel	Abraham Brueghel	Jan Baptist Brueghel	Jan van Kessel the Elder
