= Gualterus Gysaerts =

Flemish painter (1649 – c. 1677)

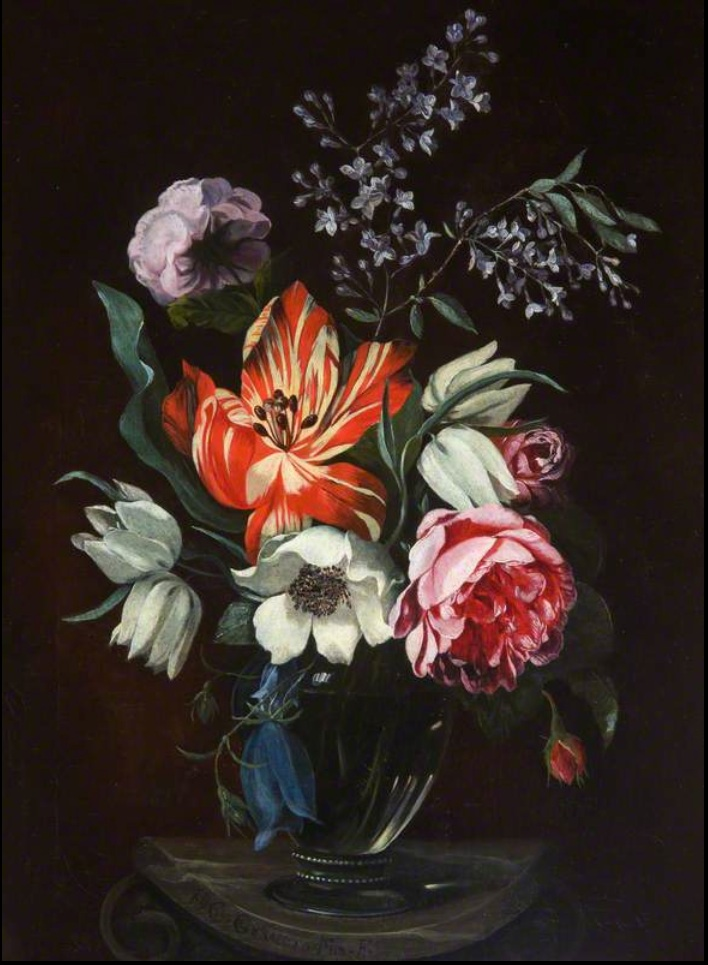
Tulips, roses and other flowers

Wouter Gysaerts or Gualterus Gysaerts (1649 – in or after 1677) was a Flemish still life painter who specialized in flower pieces and garlands.

== Life ==
Gualterus Gysaerts was born in Antwerp as the nephew (or maybe the cousin) of David Teniers the Younger. He was a pupil of Philip Fruytiers. He became a master in the local Guild of Saint Luke in 1670. He moved to Mechelen in 1674 where he joined the local order of the Friars Minor called the Recollects. On becoming a monk he changed his first name from Wouter to Gualterus. He died in Mechelen in or after 1677.

== Work ==
He mainly painted still lifes of flowers in vases and paintings with garlands in the style of the Flemish monk painter Daniel Seghers. He generally signed with F.G. Gysaerts and later with F.G. Gysaerts Min.F.

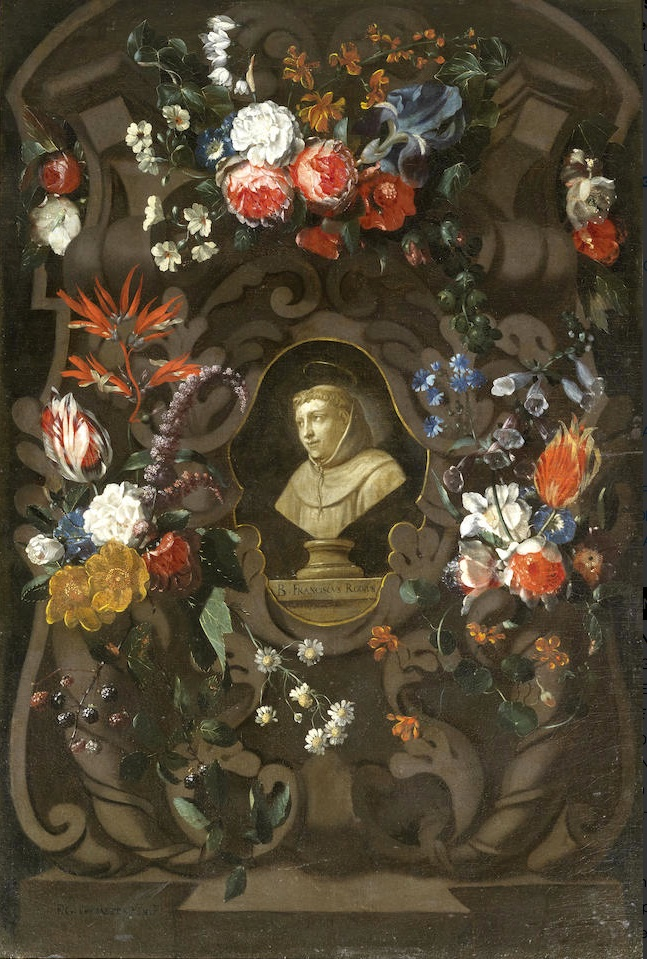
A garland of flowers surrounding the bust of Franciscus Rodius, Martyr of Gorkum

Gysaerts collaborated with other painters particularly in the production of garland paintings. Garland paintings are a special type of still life developed in Antwerp by artists such as Jan Brueghel the Elder, Hendrick van Balen, Frans Francken the Younger, Peter Paul Rubens and Daniel Seghers. They typically show a flower garland around a devotional image or portrait. Garland paintings were usually collaborations between a still life and a figure painter. In 1676 Gualterus Gysaerts collaborated with his uncle David Teniers the Younger on a series of 19 garland paintings depicting the martyrs of Gorkum. The series was made for the Minorite Church in Mechelen following the beatification of the martyrs on 9 July 1676. Teniers painted the monochrome bust portrait of each martyr in a cartouche while Gysaerts painted the cartouche and the flower garland surrounding it. Of these paintings, 8 are still known to exist, one of which is in the Rijksmuseum. Both Gysaerts and Teniers signed the painting in the Rijksmuseum.
