= Abraham Willemsens =

Flemish painter

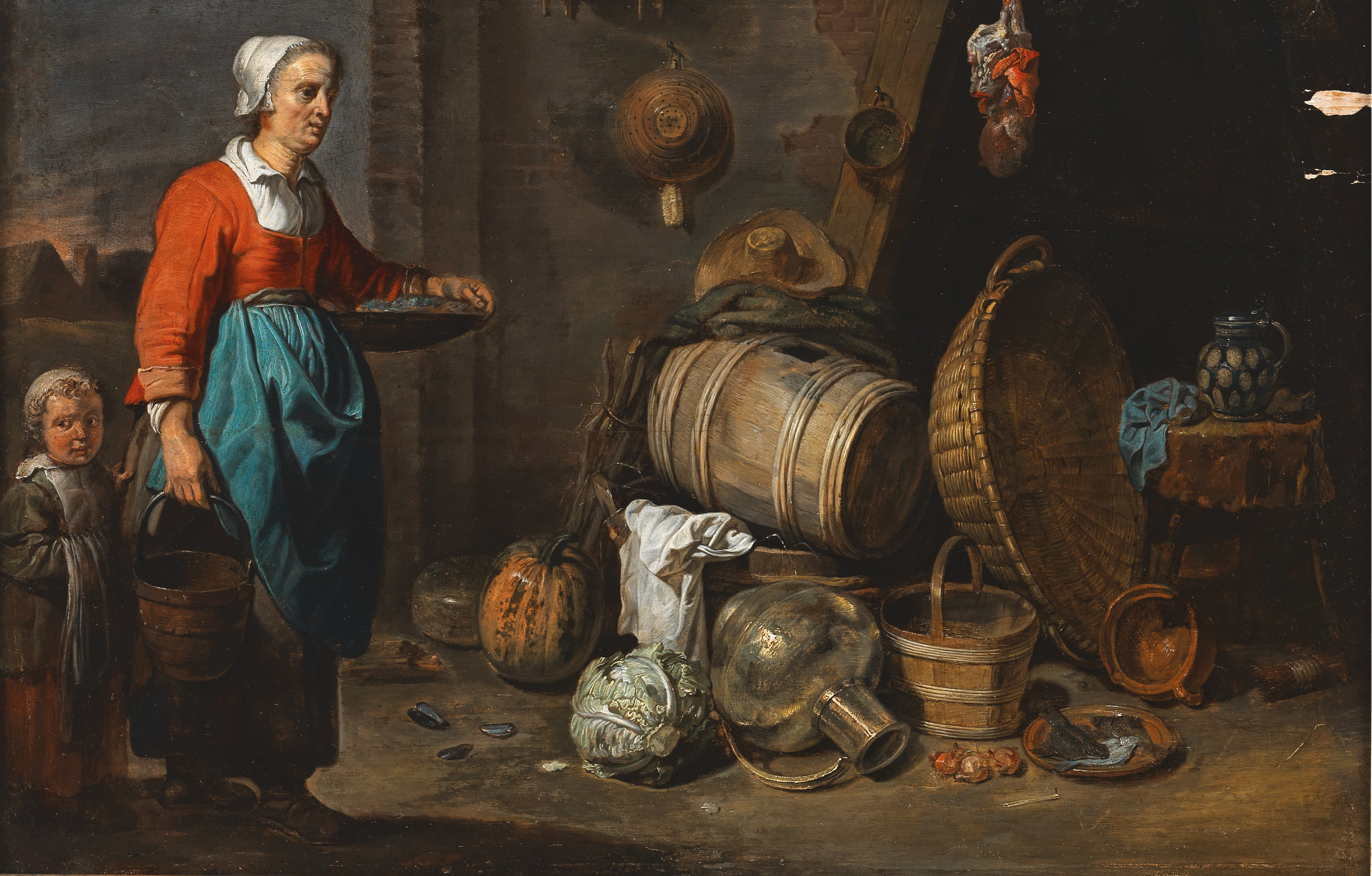
Maid in a barn

Abraham Willemsens or Abraham Willemsen (Antwerp 15 February 1614 - Antwerp, 5 December 1672), was a Flemish painter and art dealer. He painted biblical subjects and genre scenes. His genre scenes were somewhat reminiscent of the style of the Le Nain brothers. He also produced copies after the works of Rubens and Italian masters. His workshop had a large output which was mainly exported to Spain through Antwerp art dealers.

== Life ==
He was born in Antwerp as the son of Michiel Willemsen(s) and Elisabetha de Bruichel. He was baptized in Antwerp Cathedral on 15 February 1614. From his father's second marriage with Lucia Kersmakers four half-brothers and sisters were born, including the sculptor Lodewijk (1630–1702) and the painter Anthoni (Anthonis or Antoon, 1629–1691). In 1627-1628 he is recorded in the Antwerp Guild of Saint Luke as a pupil of Willem Anthonis (also called Guillaume Anthoni and Gilliam Antonissens), a genre painter active in Antwerp. In 1645, he was elected dean of the Guild. He was recorded the same year in Paris where he spent a significant amount of time until about 1648-1650. He was in contact with the Flemish-French still life painter and art dealer Jean-Michel Picart who held a significant position in the Paris Guild of Saint Luke. Picart sold four of his paintings to the Duchess of Orléans. In Paris, he also came into contact with the Le Nain brothers, whose style appears to have influenced his rural scenes.

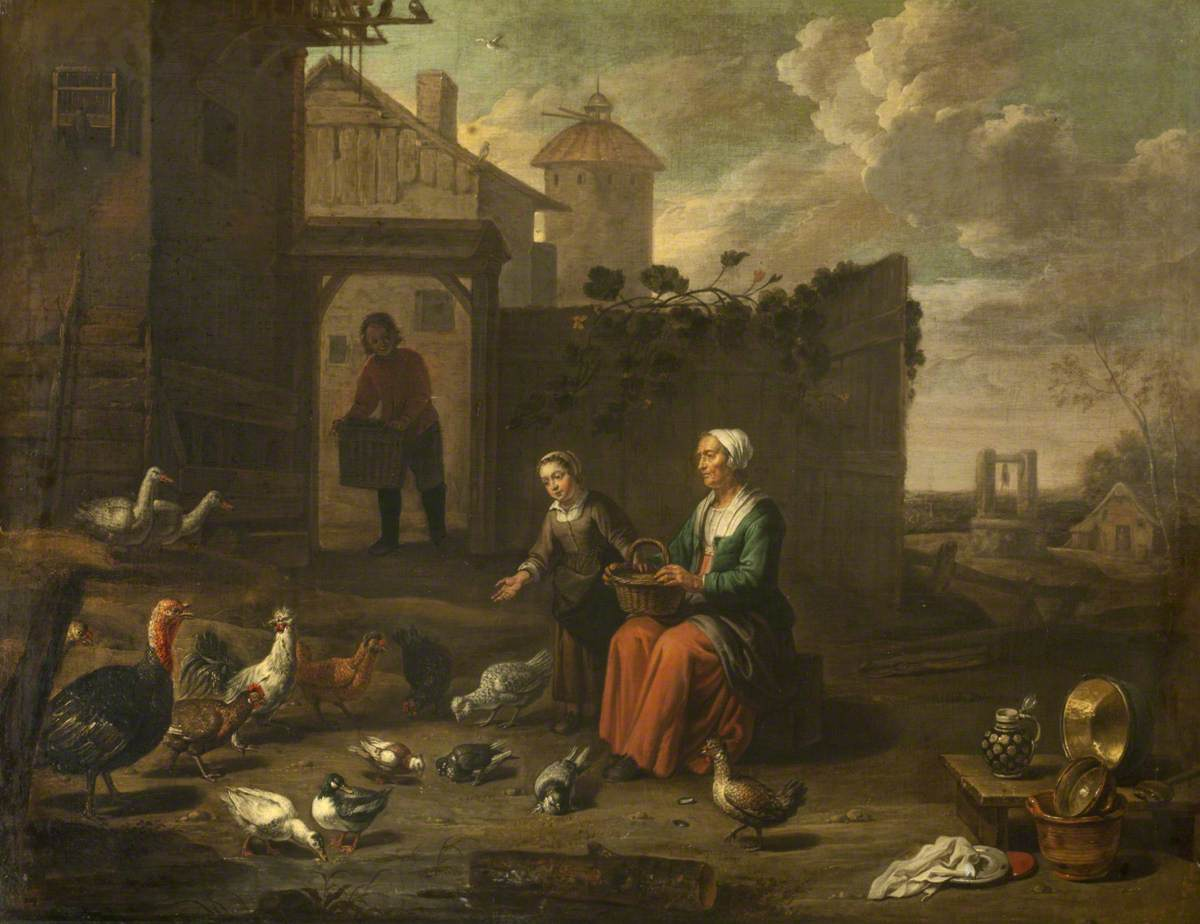
A Woman and a Girl Tending Poultry

Willemsens married Maria de Lannoy (Lannoij) (1621-1678) on 29 June 1647. He operated a big workshop with a large output that supplied the export market. Many family members, including his half-brother Anthoni and second and third cousins, assisted in the workshop's production. Workshop works were marked with the monogram "A.W.IN.F" and typically painted on copper which facilitated the export which was aimed mainly at the Spanish market. The subject matter of these workshop exports consisted mostly of New Testament stories, the legends of the saints and the life of the Virgin. He was recorded in the archives of the prominent Antwerp art dealer Guillam Forchondt in 1669 and also worked for the art dealer Matthijs Musson. The sales records of these aforementioned art dealers document sales of a total of 461 paintings from the Willemsens workshop mainly destined for the Spanish and French markets. Of these, 208 were works by other Antwerp painters to which the workshop had added the background staffage. In addition, the workshop directly worked with Antwerp painters such as Cornelis de Baellieur, Hieronymus Janssens and Hendrik de Poeter to add staffage in their paintings. The staffage was mostly incorporated into large landscape paintins, which were typically adaptations of works by Flemish masters such as Rubens, Gerard Seghers and the Francken family. In contrast to the paintings signed or monogrammed by W. himself, the workshop paintings exhibit considerable variations in quality.

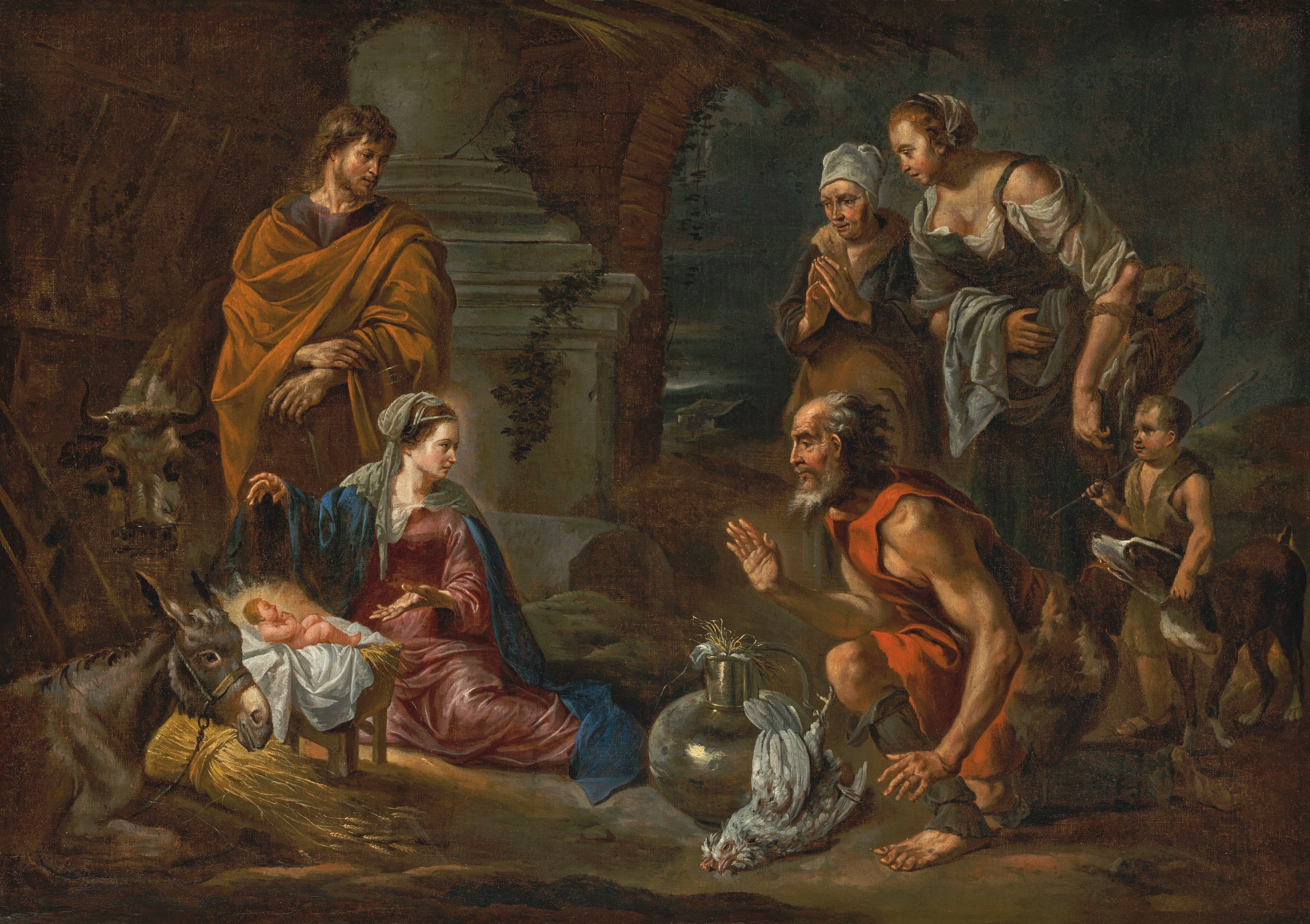
The Nativity

On 9 April he and his wife made a will as he was suffering from an illness. At the time they were living on the Florisstraat in Antwerp. He was active as an art dealer himself. He had three apprentices: Francois Verbeck started his apprenticeship in the guild year 1651/52 and Jan Looybos and Hendrick Watele in the guild year 1653/54.

He died in Antwerp where he was buried in the St. George Church on 5 December 1672.

== Work ==
The painter was virtually unknown until the discovery in the early 1990s of a painting bearing his full signature. Since then his oeuvre has gradually been reconstituted. Numerous attribution issues had to be dealt with as Willemsens was not the only contemporary painter who used the monogram AW. The artists Artus Wolffort and Adriaen Willemhoudt also signed with the monogram AW. The monogrammist AW who was responsible for a number of oil on copper paintings held by the Prado Museum has now been conclusively identified as Adriaen Willemhoudt. Because of the similarity in style there have also been mis-attributions of Willemsens' work to Willem van Herp.

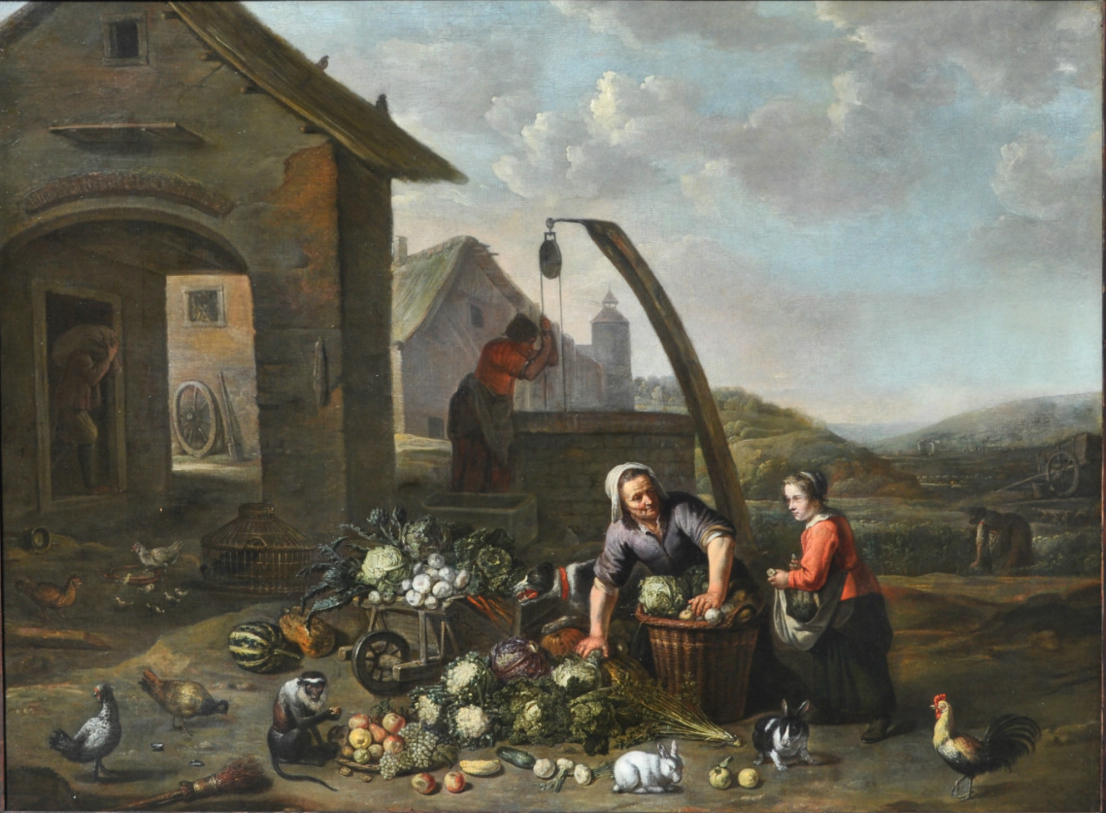
Animated courtyard of a farm

Art historian Gregory Martin has argued that Willemsens should be identified with the anonymous master referred to as the Master of the Béguins. This notname was given to an anonymous master active in Paris in the mid 17th century who often depicted scenes with beguines. The style of this master's works were grouped because of their subject matter and their closeness in style to that of the Le Nain brothers. The identification of Willemsens with the Master of the Béguins has not been widely accepted in the art historical community.

Willemsens is recorded in Paris around 1645 and this can explain the influence of the Le Nain brothers who were active in Paris at that time and were known for their peasant scenes. Aside from the subject matter, another reason why Willemsens' work has often been mis-attributed to the Le Nains is that, like the Le Nains, he habitually used coarse linen as the canvas support.

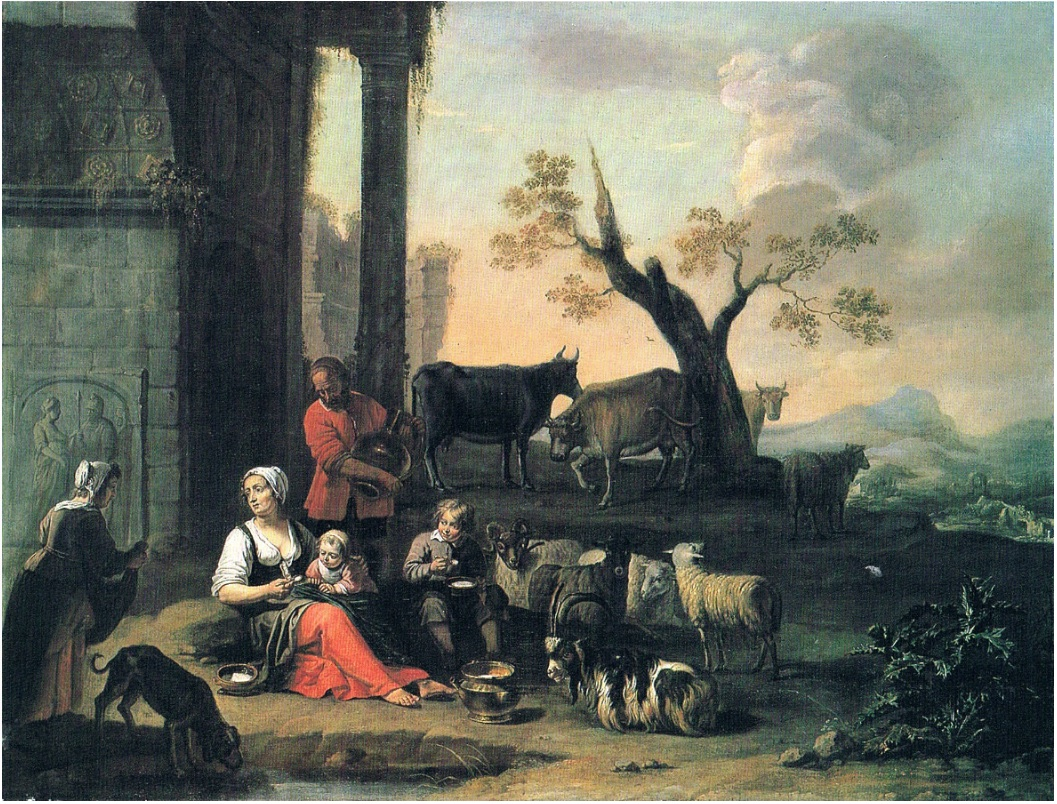
Shepherd family resting by classical ruins

In response to the contemporary demand for copies of Rubens' oil sketches, Willemsens produced a large number of copies of Rubens' work. Willemsens was together with Pieter van Lint and Willem van Herp one of the principal producers of such copies for the Antwerp art dealers. In addition to copies after Rubens, Willemsens painted landscapes on copper, often animated with religious or genre scenes. His figures were derived primarily from paintings by Rubens, Hendrick van Balen and Gerard Seghers. Willemsens also took inspiration from Jan Brueghel the Elder, Frans Francken the Elder and the Le Nain brothers.
