= The Painter's Family =

Painting by Jacob Jordaens

- The Artist's Family in a Garden
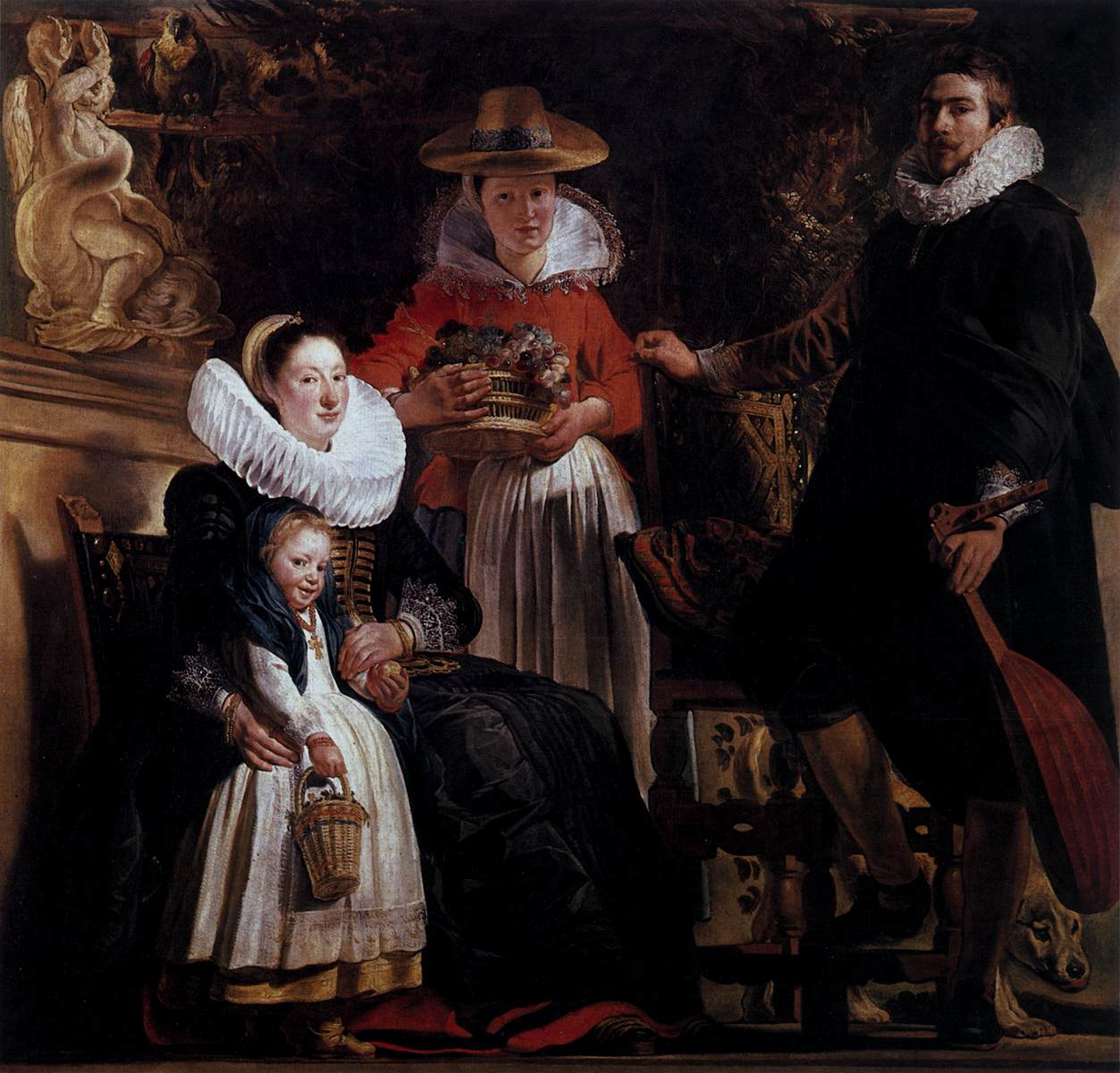
- Artist: Jacob Jordaens
- Year: 1621–1622
- Medium: Oil on canvas
- Movement: Flemish Baroque
- Dimensions: 181 cm × 187 cm (71 in × 74 in)
- Location: Museo del Prado, Madrid

The Painter's Family is an oil painting in the Flemish Baroque style by painter Jacob Jordaens. It was completed in 1621–22. The painting depicts the artist with his wife, Catharina van Noort, and their first child, Elizabeth. It is on display at the Museo del Prado, in Madrid.

== Description ==
The painting depicts Jordaens together with his wife Catharina van Noort and their eldest daughter Elisabeth. The woman behind them is likely a servant due to her attire and position in the painting. The family is shown wearing elegant, high-quality clothing reminiscent of noble attire, reflecting the artist’s intention to emphasize his elevated social status. Catharina van Noort, his wife, is portrayed seated firmly in an armchair, recognizable by her slightly almond-shaped eyes, high nose, and full lips. She wears fashionable attire appropriate to her age, including a necklace with a pendant cross and a bonnet-style turban. Jewels are visible in her hair, and she wears earrings. Elisabeth, their daughter, is dressed in contemporary children’s fashion, with a cross-shaped necklace and holding a basket of flowers. She is depicted with a charming, childlike expression. The artist is shown standing in a relaxed pose, resting his right arm on the back of the armchair and his right foot on its crossbar. He holds a lute in his left hand, symbolizing cultivated leisure and aristocratic refinement. The lute may also represent family harmony. A small dog at his feet symbolizes marital fidelity.

The figures are set within an elegant garden, a motif associated with the long tradition of placing figures in the “Garden of Love.” Jordaens’s contemporaries, such as Peter Paul Rubens (Rubens and Isabella Brant in the Honeysuckle Bower, 1609–10, Alte Pinakothek, Munich) and Frans Hals (Marriage Portrait of Isaac Massa and Beatrix van der Laen, 1622, Rijksmuseum, Amsterdam), also employed similar allegories. The intertwining vine behind the couple symbolizes the steadfastness of marriage, while the fountain with Cupid represents love. Elisabeth’s ring and flowers further symbolize fidelity, innocence, and purity.

The work reflects the aspirations of early Baroque Flemish painters to elevate their profession by presenting themselves as members of the cultured elite. Jordaens’s depiction of his family in noble attire and allegorical surroundings underscores this ambition.

== Provenance ==
The painting entered the Spanish royal collection during the reign of Philip V of Spain and is now part of the collection of the Museo del Prado, in Madrid.
