= Pieter van Lint =

Flemish painter (1609–1690)

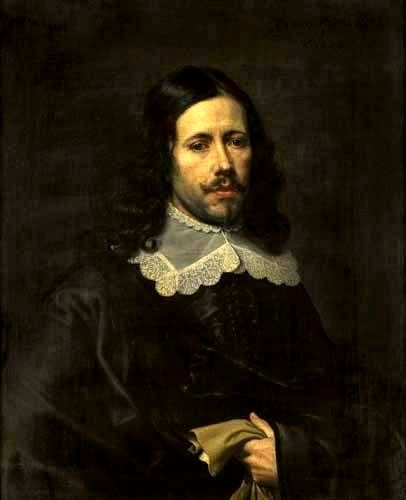
Self-portrait

Pieter van Lint or Peter van Lint (1609–1690) was a Flemish painter, draughtsman and designer of tapestries. He excelled in history paintings, genre scenes and portraits in the Flemish Baroque style with some Classisizing influence. He worked in Antwerp and Italy.

== Life ==
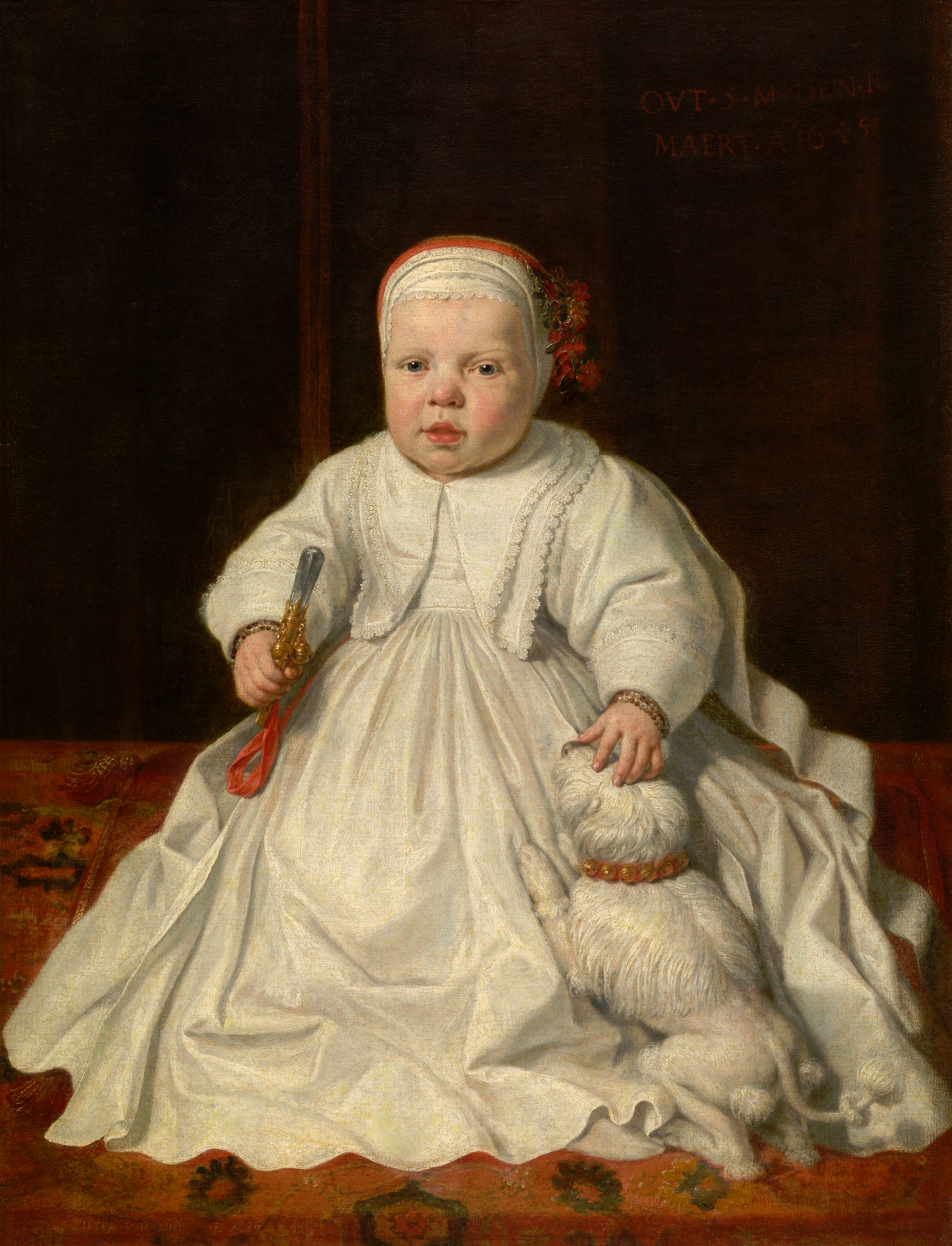
Portrait of a Child

He was born in Antwerp where he trained under Artus Wolffort. During his training he frequently visited Antwerp's churches to copy the paintings of his contemporaries such as Peter Paul Rubens as well as those of earlier generations such as Marten de Vos and the Francken brothers.

Van Lint become a master in the Guild of Saint Luke in 1633. In that same year he traveled to Rome where he remained until 1640. In Rome he worked for Cardinal Domenico Ginnasi, Bishop of Ostia, who employed him to decorate the local cathedral. Van Lint also frescoed the Cybo family chapel in the Santa Maria del Popolo with the Legend of the True Cross in 1636–40. In addition to religious commissions, the artist painted numerous small genre scenes in the style of the Bamboccianti. He spent time in Paris from 1640 to 1641 where he possibly was in contact with Poussin.

The year after his return to Antwerp in 1642 he married Elisabeth Willemyns. The couple had seven children. When he became widowed in 1679, the artist remarried the following year to Anna Moeren (Moren or Morren).

His pupils included Caerel de las Cuevas, Jan-Baptista Ferrari and Godfried Maes. His son Hendrik Frans van Lint from his second marriage was a celebrated landscape painter in Rome.

He died in Antwerp.

== Work ==
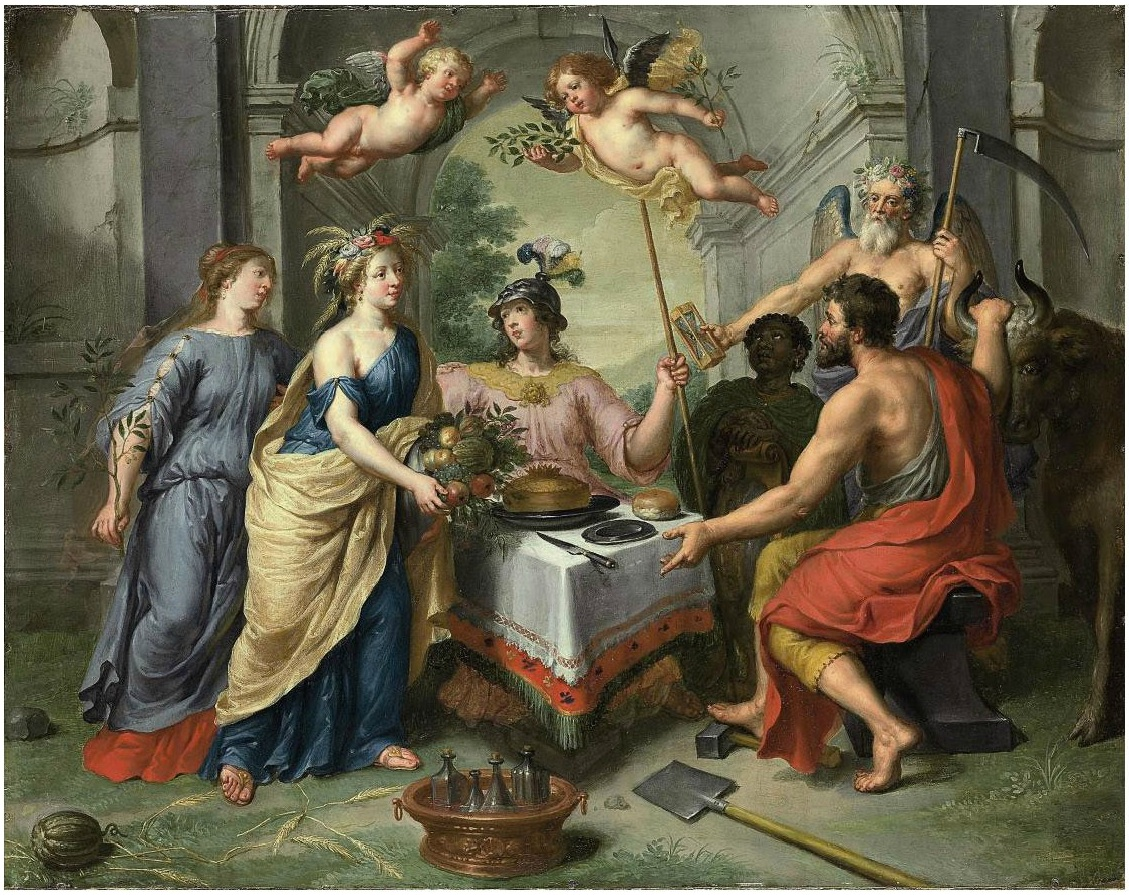
Labour rewarded by Abundance and Peace

His earliest works follow his master Wolffort's style, which was itself indebted to the academic manner of Otto van Veen. During his stay in Rome he made many studies after the antique and developed an interest in classicism, which remained a constant characteristic of his style. At the same time, he tried his hand at the Bamboccianti genre style of painting.

Many of his later works were religious paintings, such as the Marriage of the Virgin (1640) in Antwerp Cathedral, which were in the classicizing style of Wollfort and his Roman examples. Besides larger paintings, he made small-scale devotional paintings, which found a large market in Spain and the Spanish colonies in America. He often completed assignments for leading Antwerp art dealers such as Matthijs Musson and Guillam Forchondt.

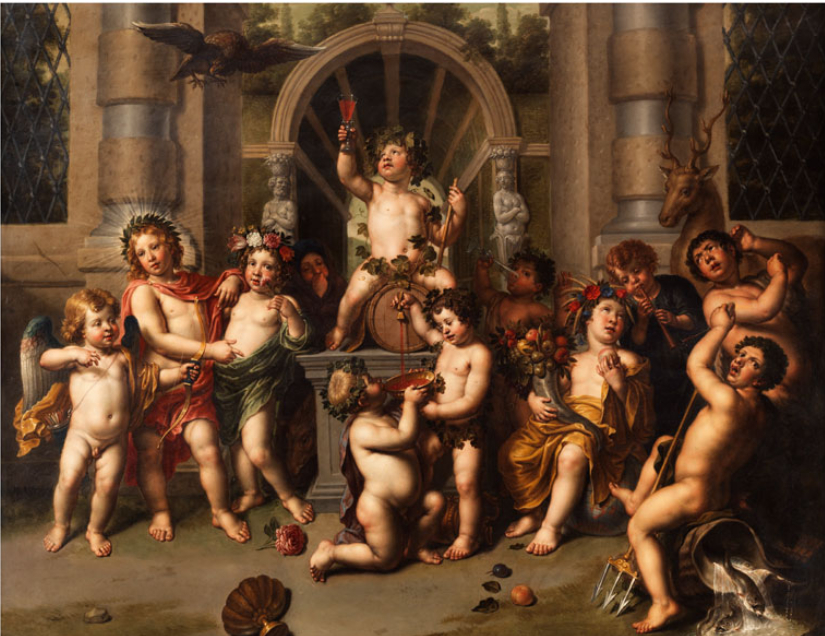
Children's baccahanal

In response to the contemporary demand for copies of Rubens' oil sketches, van Lint produced a large number of copies of Rubens' work. Pieter van Lint was together with Abraham Willemsens and Willem van Herp one of the principal producers of such copies for the Antwerp art dealers. Many of these were executed on copper, a material for painting that was highly prized both for durability and its glossy finish in Spain. Four oils on copper works by van Lint are in the collection of the Prado Museum in Madrid, including a copy after Rubens.

An album with travel sketches, including two sketches which are signed 'P.V.L.' in the collection of the Martin von Wagner Museum in Würzburg, which were formerly attributed to Pieter van Laer (the central figure of the Bamboccianti) has now been re-attributed to Pieter van Lint. The album contains sketches, which the artist made of scenes, including of his fellow travelers, during his travels in Italy around 1636. The drawings give a lively idea of the conditions and the manner in which travelers undertook their travels at the time.

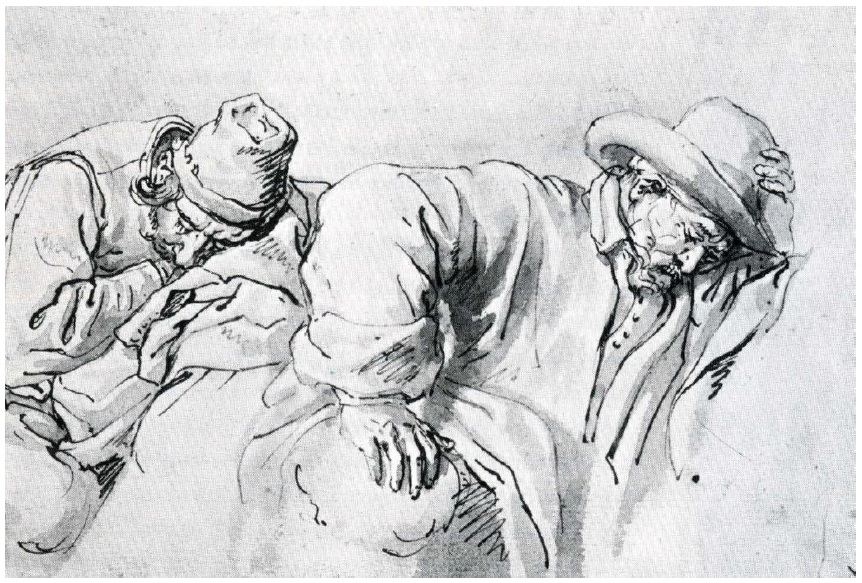
Sleeping travellers

Pieter van Lint was also active as a designer of tapestries. Correspondence between the Antwerp trader Hendrik Lenaerts and the Brussels weavers Jan van Leefdael and Gerard van der Strecken dated 1660 shows that van Lint had designed 8 cartoons for a Story of Domitian. A tapestry series dated 1639 on the Story of the Virgin Mary still preserved in the Pottery convent in Bruges is believed to have been made after models by Pieter van Lint.
