= Matthijs Musson =

Flemish painter

Matthijs Musson (28 October 1598, Antwerp, Spanish Netherlands – 3 November 1678, Antwerp, Spanish Netherlands) was a painter and art dealer based in Antwerp, who played an important role in popularizing artists of the 17th-century Antwerp school by marketing them throughout Europe.

== Life ==
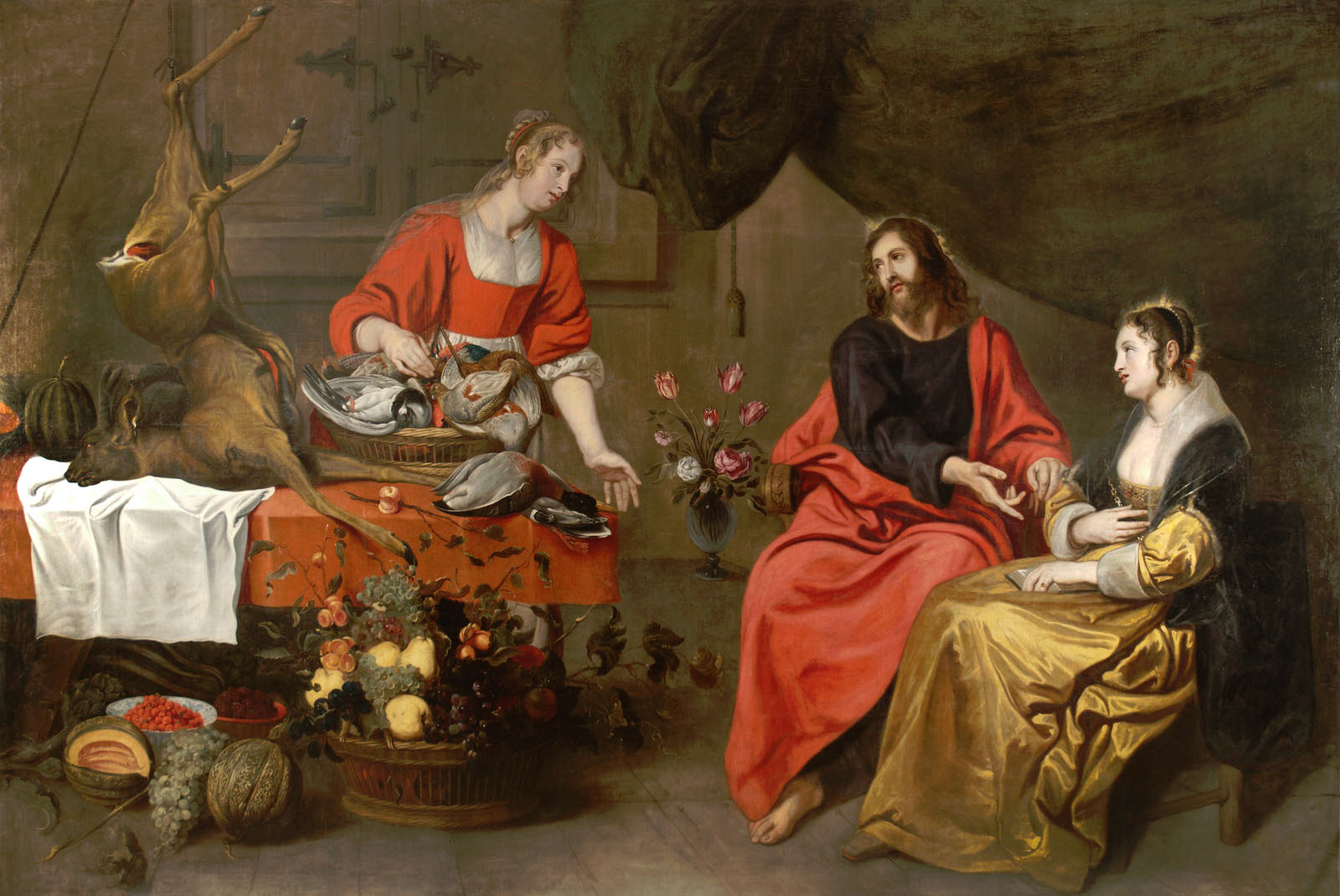
Jesus in the House of Martha and Mary

Matthijs Musson was born in Antwerp as the son of Robert Musson, an innkeeper. Matthijs is possibly a pupil in the workshop of Rubens and becomes a master in the Antwerp Guild of Saint Luke in 1622. Matthijs married on 24 February 1632 Maria Borremans who died on 12 May 1646 without issue. In the year 1646-1647 he was deacon of the Antwerp Guild of Saint Luke. Musson remarried on 15 September 1647 Maria Fourmenois who had been widowed two times before. Her last husband was the glass and ebony dealer Cornelis de Wael. After his marriage to Fourmenois, Musson started to deal in art and his wife played an important role in this trading business.

Musson had contacts with dealers throughout Europe. In Flanders, he was active mainly in Antwerp and Brussels. About 60 painters worked for Musson and Fourmenois including Joos de Momper, David Teniers the Younger, Abraham Willemsens, Victor Wolfvoet II and Willem van Herp. After discovering that works of painters from Mechelen, a city situated between Brussels and Antwerp, were of high quality and relatively inexpensive he started sourcing from this city. As a trained painter, he did not limit himself to trading. He gave detailed instructions to his artists and for instance paid Pieter van Lint to make changes to a human figure in one of his paintings.

In 1657 Matthijs Musson bought the art works from the estate of Frans Snyders, which included great works by Rubens and van Dyck as well as examples by Pieter Bruegel the Elder, Joachim Patinir, Jan Brueghel the Younger, Joos van Cleve, and Frans Ykens.

Many of his correspondences have been published and studies of his business relationships with other dealers across Europe have contributed to an understanding of the 17th-century art trade and its economics.

== Work ==
Only very few artistic works of Matthijs Musson are known. His style was clearly influenced by his master Rubens in his preference for ornamental opulence, sumptuous still lifes and a dramatic sense of narration. The human figures in his compositions are more stylised and svelte in comparison with the Rubenesque models.

A work entitled Jesus at the home of Martha and Mary (Collection of the Banco Bilbao Vizcaya Argentaria) uses a biblical subject as a pretext to create a sumptuous still life. His rendition of the vase of flowers in the centre of the composition is reminiscent of works by the Flemish artist Jan Philip van Thielen, for whom Musson acted as a dealer.
