= Lambert de Hondt the Elder =

Flemish painter and draughtsman

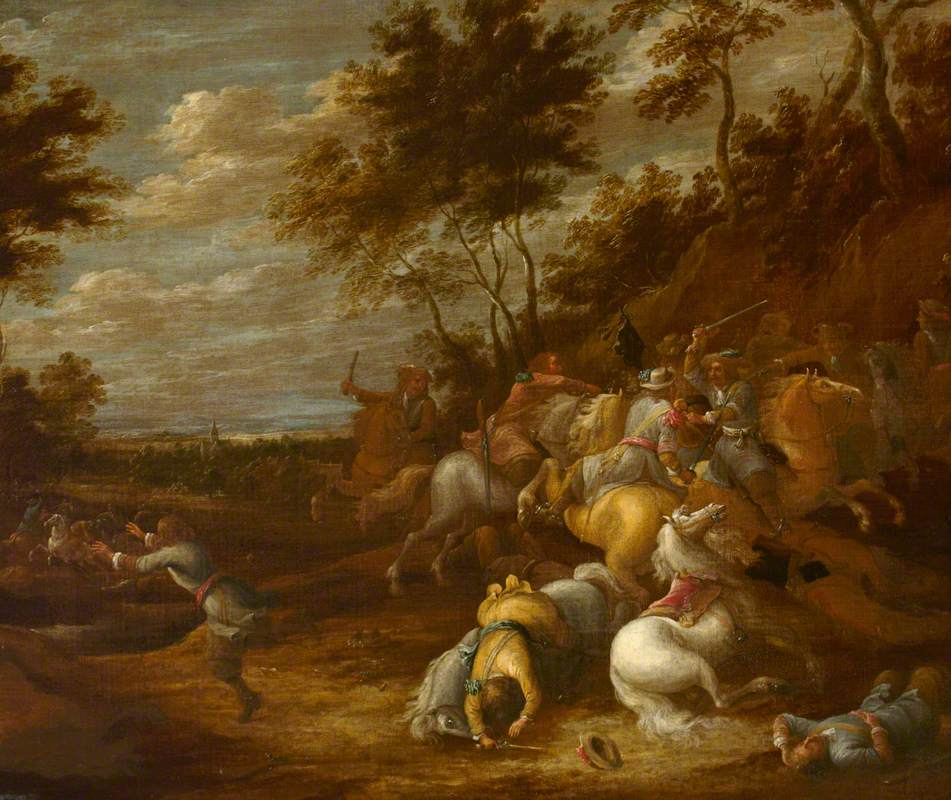
Cavalry skirmish

Lambert de Hondt the Elder or Lambert de Hondt (I) (c. 1620 – before 10 February 1665) was a Flemish painter, tapestry designer and draughtsman mainly known for his equestrian and battle scenes as well as his genre, landscape paintings and religious subjects.

== Life ==
Only a few details about de Hondt's life have been preserved. He was the son of Rombout de Hondt. He is recorded marrying Anna Tousijn in Mechelen on 12 June 1632. He worked in Mechelen. His widow remarried on 10 February 1665.

He is sometimes confused with another artist who signed his paintings with L. de Hondt. This other artist who also specialised in battle scenes and made designs for tapestries around 1700 is referred to as Lambert de Hondt the Younger. It is not known whether the two artists were related.

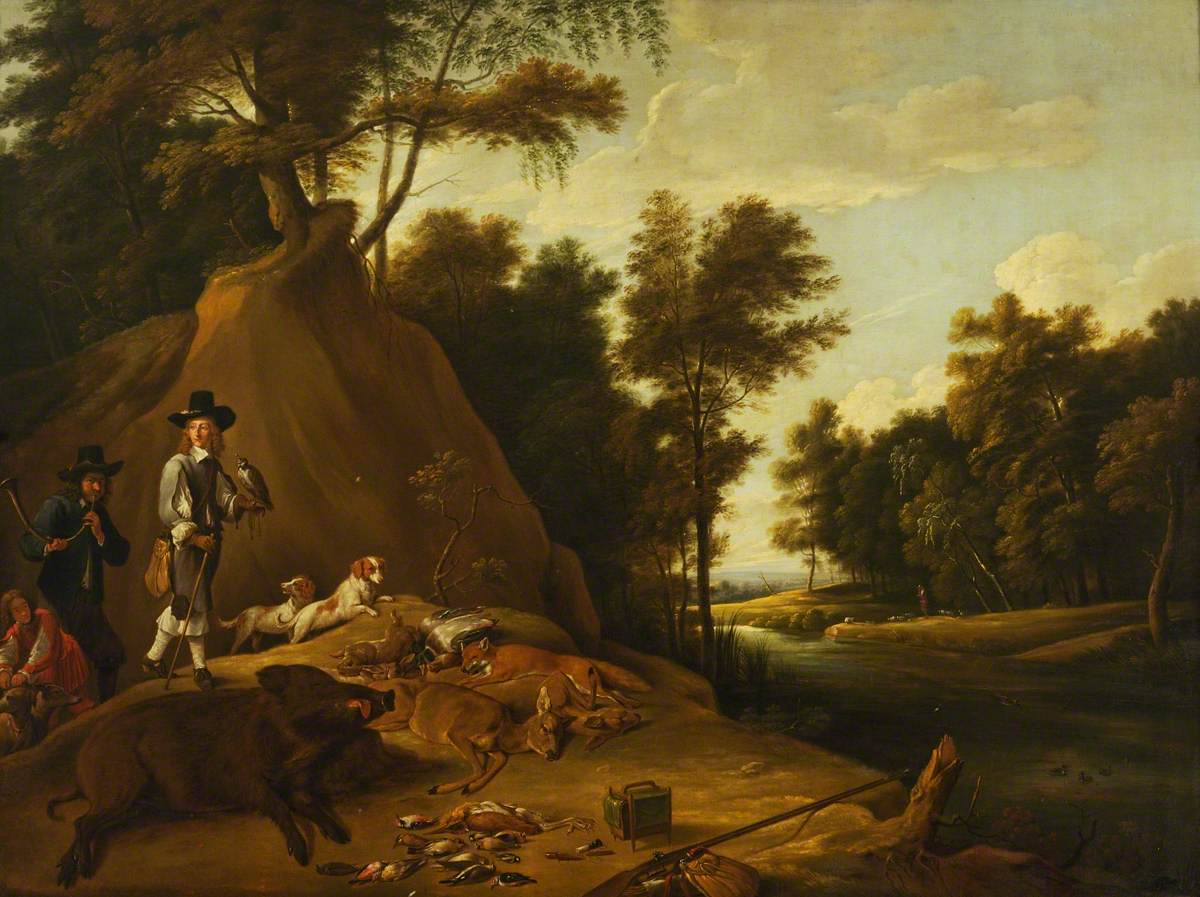
Hunting scene

De Hondt must have enjoyed high-level patronage as one of his paintings (An Encampment with Soldiers Playing Cards, now at the Wellington Museum, Apsley House, London) is marked with a white fleur-de-lis, and originally had a coat of arms on the back. This indicates that the painting was in the collection of Elisabeth Farnese.

== Work ==
He painted equestrian and battle scenes as well as his genre, landscape paintings and religious subjects. He was probably responsible for the compositions depicting military camps, cavalry and military convoys and battles signed L.D. HONDT. These paintings are reminiscent of the manner of David Teniers the Younger. In his military scenes he often used a sketchy technique. His paintings mostly depict horses and cavalry. He also painted village scenes (such as The Vegetable Vendor), hunting scenes (such as A Hunting Scene) and landscapes.

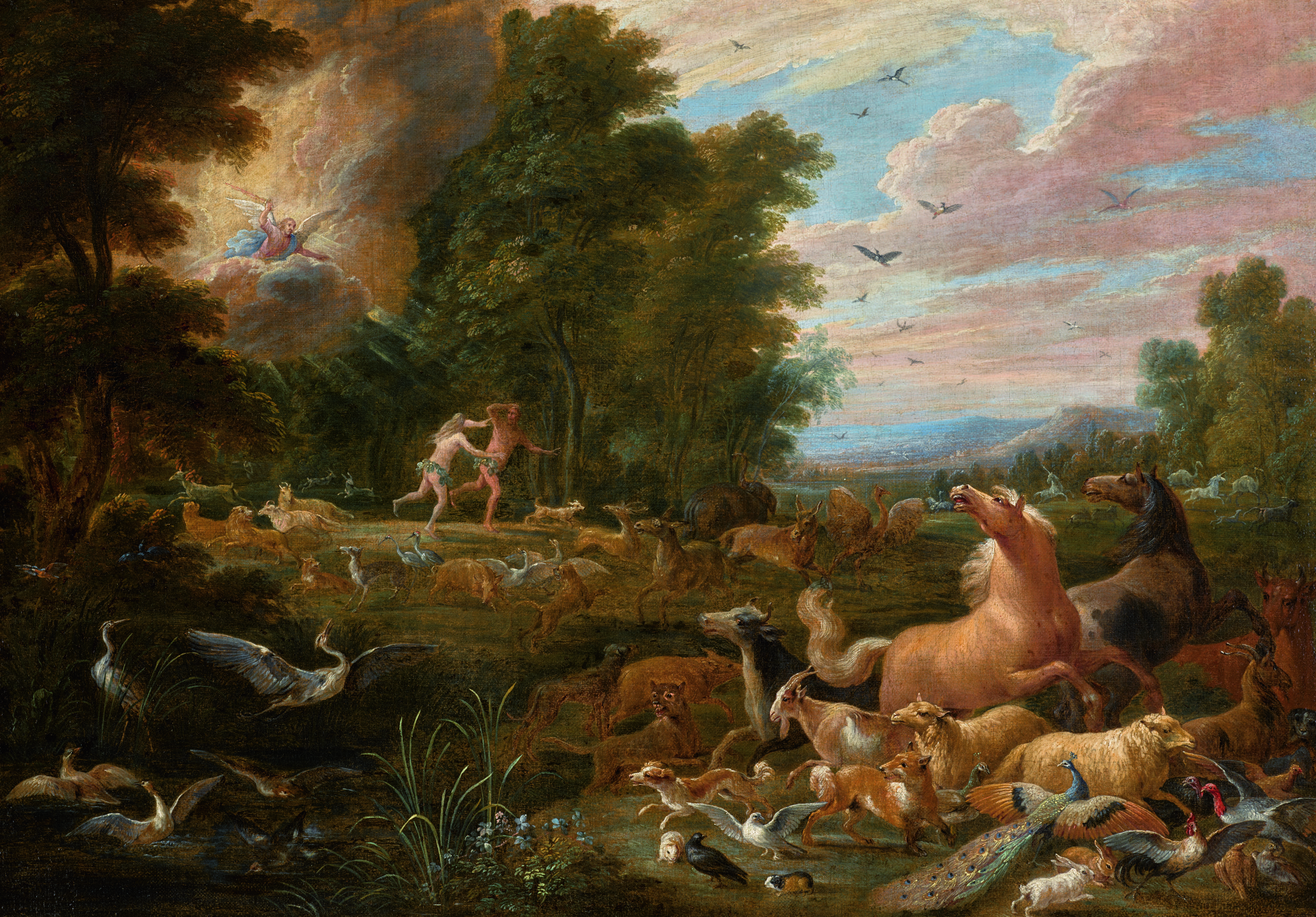
Expulsion from the Garden of Eden, a collaboration with Willem van Herp

As was the custom at the time, he regularly collaborated with other painters. He worked with Willem van Herp in the production of landscapes (painted by de Hondt) with figures (painted by van Herp) such as Noah gathering his Family and the Animals on the Ark, Orpheus charming the animals, St. Francis with the Animals, etc. These paintings are similar in composition and are a variation of the type of the so-called 'paradise landscape'. Paradise landscapes depict the Garden of Eden as described in the Book of Genesis, filled with all the animals, fish and birds that were believed to be God's creation. The type was invented and popularized by Jan Brueghel the Elder. Jan Brueghel was employed at the court of the Archdukes Albert and Isabella in Brussels, which maintained an extensive animal menagerie. As a native of Antwerp, a major port city and trading center for exotic goods and animals from Asia and the New World, Brueghel would have been able to witness these exotic animals alive. Jan Brueghel was thus in an ideal position to study many domestic and exotic animal species and include them in his compositions. De Hondt was manifestly inspired by Brueghel's paradise landscapes such as Brueghel's The Creation of Adam and The Entry of the Animals into Noah's Ark. He was clearly also familiar with Rubens' animal scenes as his depiction of the lions in his 'paradise paintings' resemble those of Rubens in the painting Daniel in the Lion's Den.

He occasionally painted on copper, a support which offered a perfectly smooth surface allowing the precise detail of the paradise paintings.
