= Flemish Baroque painting =

Painting movement

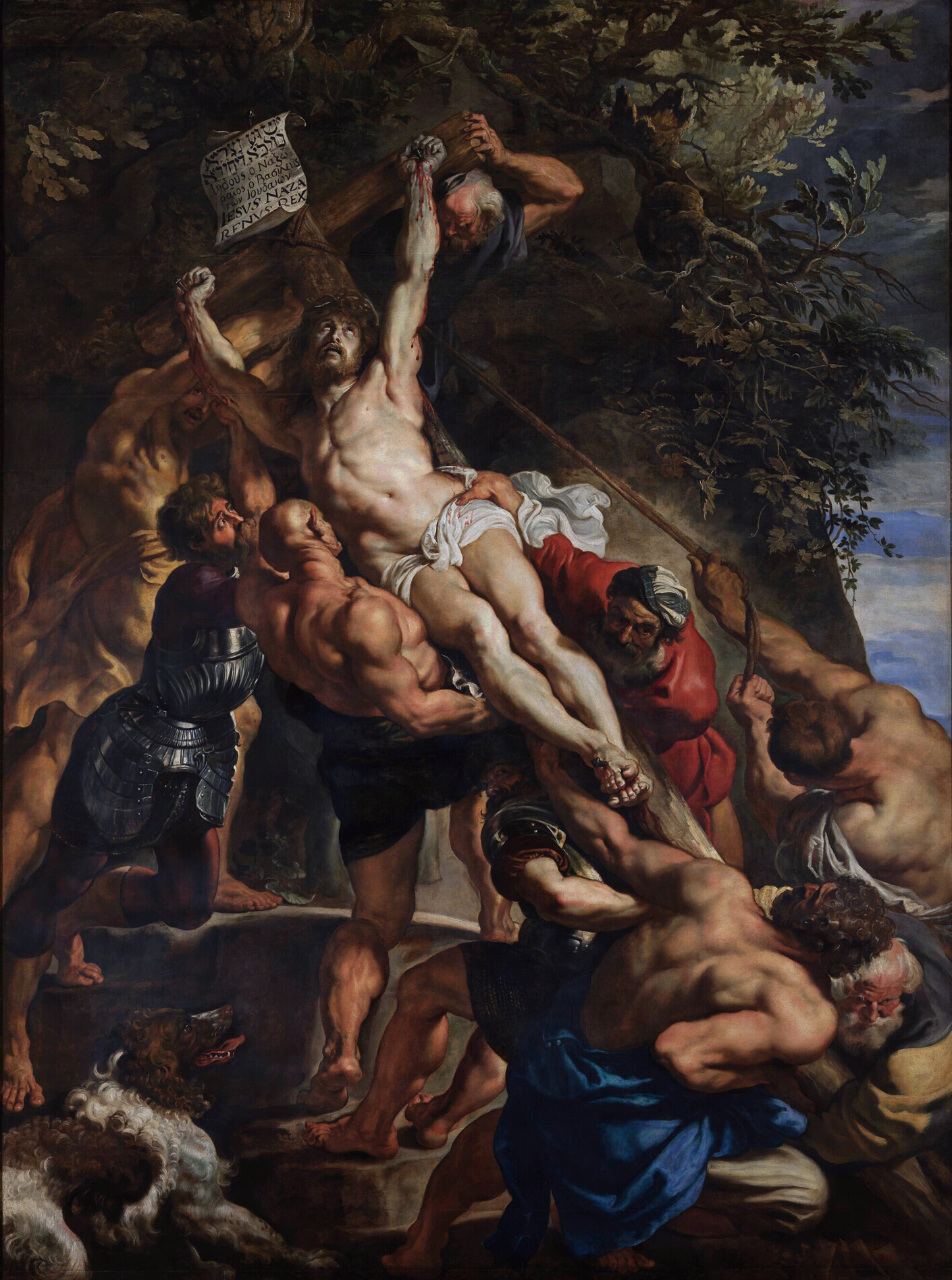
Peter Paul Rubens, The Raising of the Cross, c. 1610–1611

Flemish Baroque painting was a style of painting in the Southern Netherlands during Spanish control in the 16th and 17th centuries. The period roughly begins when the Dutch Republic was split from the Habsburg Spain regions to the south with the Spanish recapturing of Antwerp in 1585 and goes until about 1700, when Spanish Habsburg authority ended with the death of King Charles II. Antwerp, home to the prominent artists Peter Paul Rubens, Anthony van Dyck, and Jacob Jordaens, was the artistic nexus, while other notable cities include Brussels and Ghent.

Rubens, in particular, had a strong influence on seventeenth-century visual culture. His innovations helped define Antwerp as one of Europe's major artistic cities, especially for Counter-Reformation imagery, and his student Van Dyck was instrumental in establishing new directions in English portraiture. Other developments in Flemish Baroque painting are similar to those found in Dutch Golden Age painting, with artists specializing in such areas as history painting, portraiture, genre painting, landscape painting, and still life.

== General characteristics ==
"Flemish", in the context of this and artistic periods such as the "Flemish Primitives" (in English now Early Netherlandish painting), often includes the regions not associated with modern Flanders, including the Duchy of Brabant and the autonomous Prince-Bishopric of Liège. By the seventeenth century, however, Antwerp was the main city for innovative artistic production, largely due to the presence of Rubens. Brussels was important as the location of the court, attracting David Teniers the Younger later in the century.

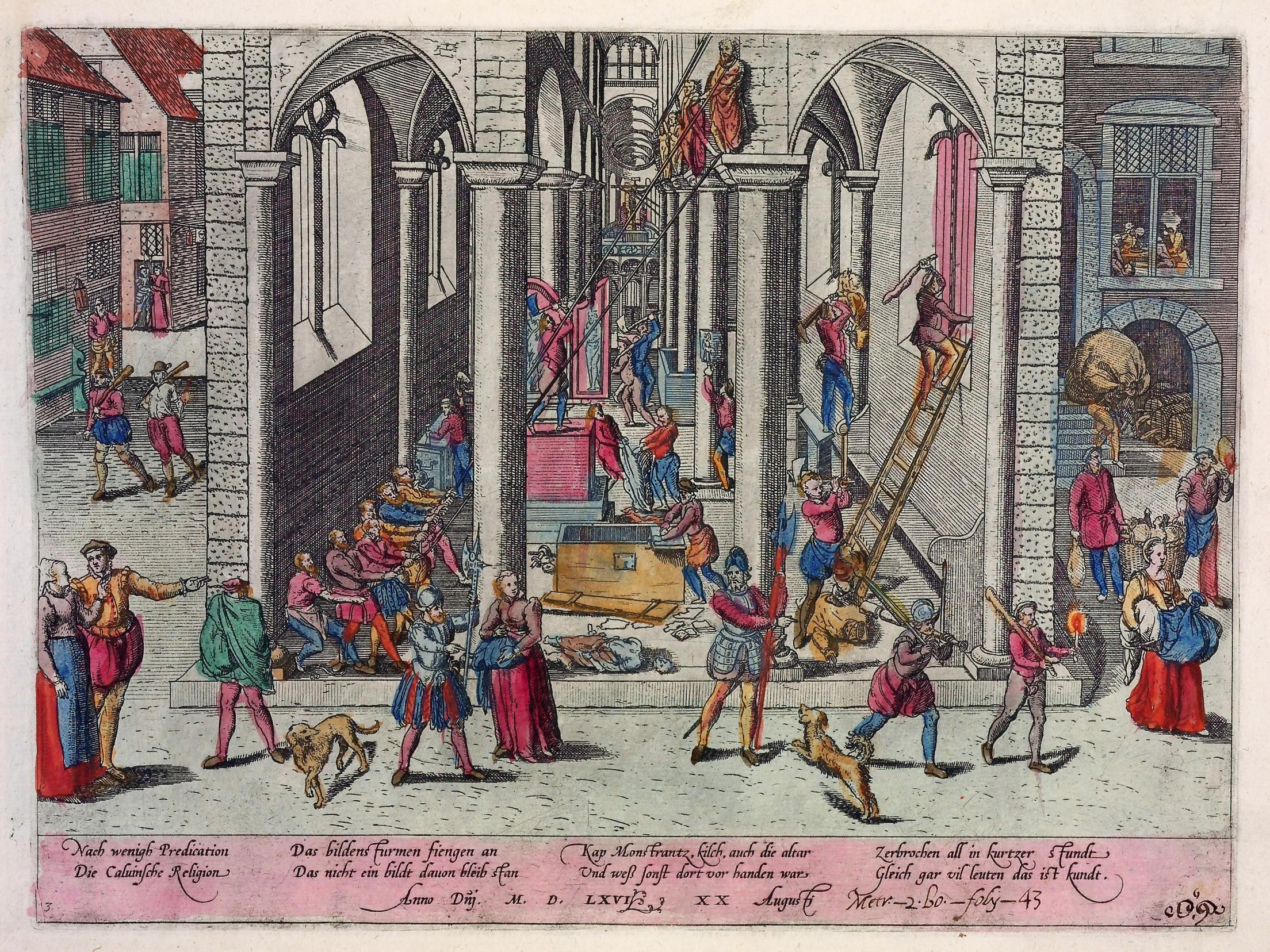
Frans Hogenberg, the Calvinist Iconoclastic Riot of August 20, 1566 when many paintings and church decorations were destroyed and subsequently replaced by Late Northern Mannerist and Baroque artists.

=== Late Mannerism ===
Although paintings produced at the end of the 16th century belong to general Northern Mannerist and Late Renaissance approaches that were common throughout Europe, artists such as Otto van Veen, Adam van Noort, Marten de Vos, and the Francken family were particularly instrumental in setting the stage for the local Baroque. Between 1585 and the early 17th century they made many new altarpieces to replace those destroyed during the iconoclastic outbreaks of 1566. Also during this time Frans Francken the Younger and Jan Brueghel the Elder became important for their small cabinet paintings, often depicting mythological and history subjects.

=== "The Age of Rubens" ===
Peter Paul Rubens (1577–1640), a student of both Otto van Veen and Adam van Noort, spent eight years in Italy (1600–1608), during which time he studied examples of classical antiquity, the Italian Renaissance, and contemporaries Adam Elsheimer and Caravaggio. Following his return to Antwerp he set up an important studio, training students such as Anthony van Dyck, and generally exerting a strong influence on the direction of Flemish art. Most artists active in the city during the first half of the 17th century were directly influenced by Rubens.

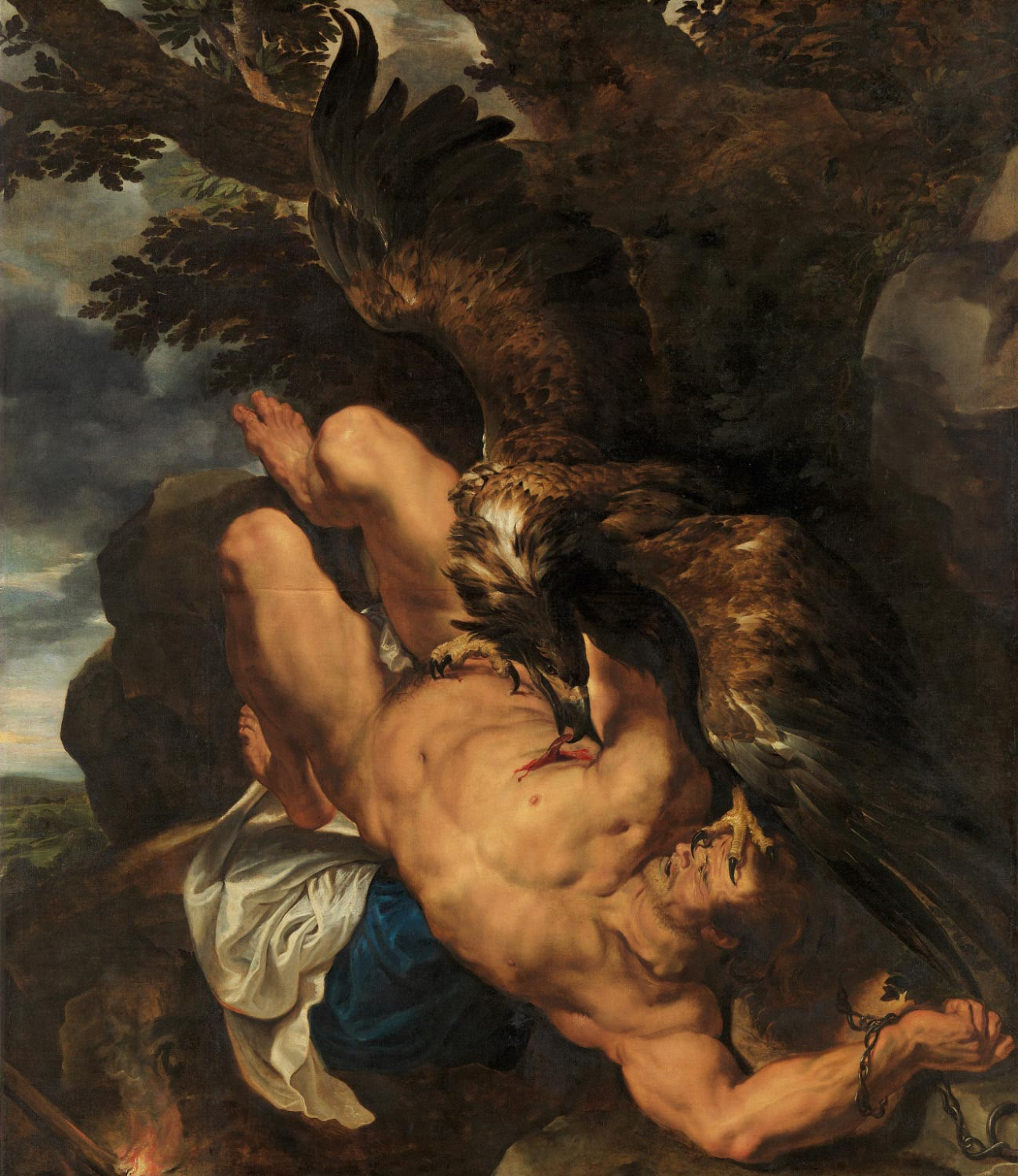
Peter Paul Rubens and Frans Snyders, Prometheus Bound, 1611–12. Philadelphia Museum of Art. This painting is Flemish Baroque example of collaboration and specialization. Snyders, who specialized in animals, painted the eagle while Rubens painted the figure of Prometheus.

=== Specializations and collaborations ===
Flemish art is notable for the large amount of collaboration that took place between independent masters, which was partly related to the local tendency to specialize in a particular area. Frans Snyders, for example, was an animal painter and Jan Brueghel the Elder was admired for his landscapes and paintings of plants. Both artists worked with Rubens, who often usually painted the figures, and other artists to create collaborative pieces.

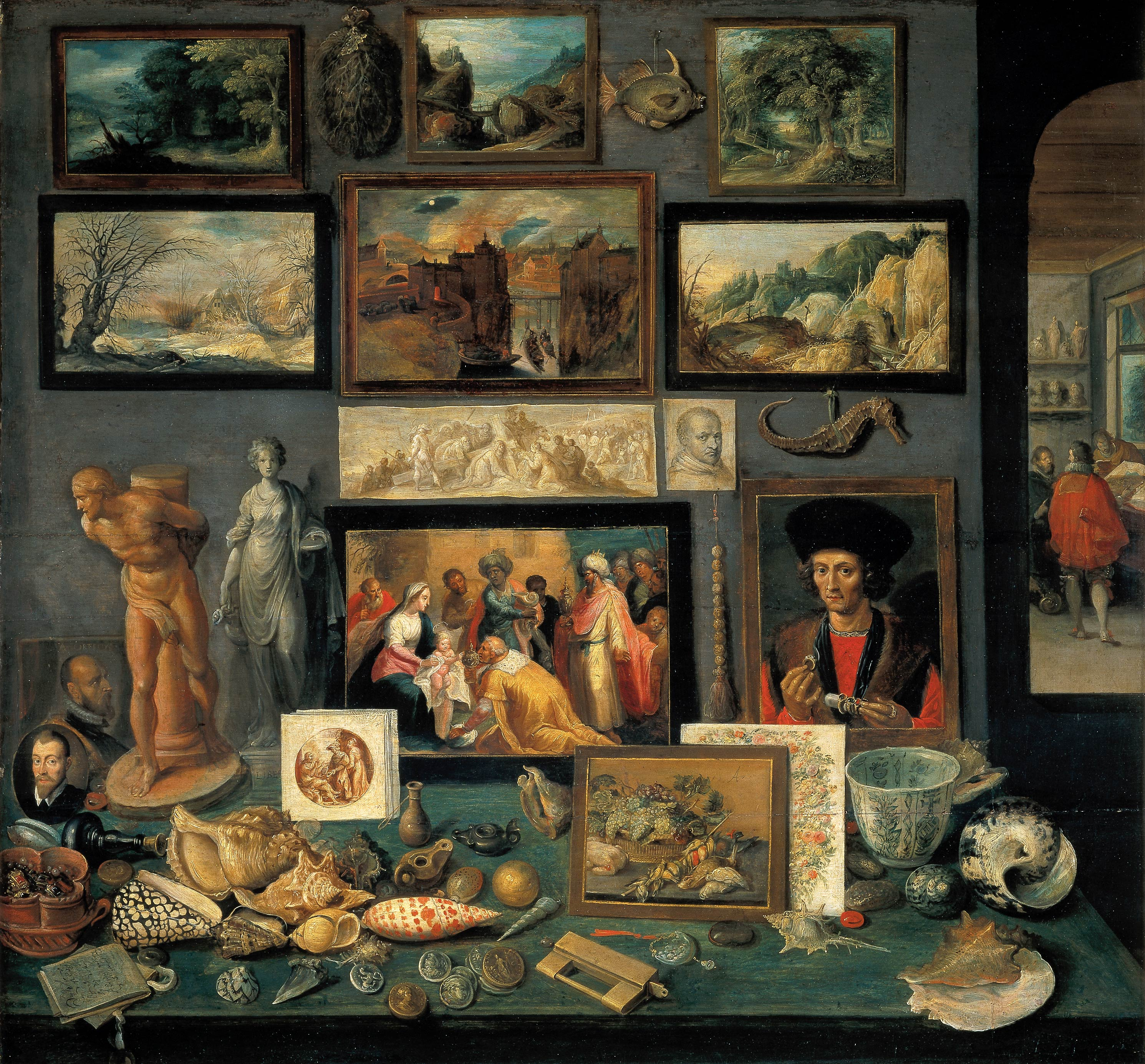
Frans Francken the Younger, Preziosenwand (Wall of Treasures), 1636. Kunsthistorischesmuseum, Vienna. This type of painting was one of the distinctly Flemish innovations that developed during the early 17th century.

=== Innovations ===
Flower still life painting, which developed around 1600 by artists such as Jan Brueghel the Elder, was partially a Flemish innovation, echoed in the Dutch Republic in the works of the Antwerp-born Ambrosius Bosschaert (1573–1621). In Antwerp, however, this new genre also developed into a specifically Catholic type of painting, the flower garland. Other types of paintings closely associated with Flemish Baroque include the monumental hunting scenes by Rubens and Snyders, and gallery paintings by artists such as Willem van Haecht and David Teniers the Younger.

== History painting ==
History painting, which includes biblical, mythological and historical subjects, was considered by seventeenth-century theoreticians as the most noble art. Abraham Janssens was an important history painter in Antwerp between 1600 and 1620, although after 1609 Rubens was the leading figure. Both Van Dyck and Jacob Jordaens were active painting monumental history scenes. Following Rubens's death, Jordaens became the most important Flemish painter. Other notable artists working in the idiom of Rubens include Gaspar de Crayer, who was active in Brussels, Artus Wolffort, Cornelis de Vos, Jan Cossiers, Theodoor van Thulden, Abraham van Diepenbeeck, and Jan Boeckhorst. During the second half of the century, history painters combined a local influence from Rubens with knowledge of classicism and Italian Baroque qualities. Artists in the vein include Erasmus Quellinus the Younger, Jan van den Hoecke, Pieter van Lint, Cornelis Schut, and Thomas Willeboirts Bosschaert. Later in the century, many painters turned to Anthony van Dyck as a major influence. Among them were Pieter Thijs, Lucas Franchoys the Younger, and artists who were also inspired by Late Baroque theatricality such as Theodoor Boeyermans and Jan-Erasmus Quellinus. Additionally, a Flemish variant of Caravaggism was expressed by Theodoor Rombouts and Gerard Seghers.

== Religious painting ==
Rubens is closely associated with the development of the Baroque altarpiece. Painted for the Arquebusiers' guild, the Descent from the Cross triptych (1611–1614; Cathedral of Our Lady, Antwerp)—with side wings depicting the Visitation and Presentation in the Temple, and exterior panels showing St. Christopher and the Hermit—is an important reflection of Counter-Reformation ideas about art combined with Baroque naturalism, dynamism and monumentality. Roger de Piles explains that "the painter has entered so fully into the expression of his subject that the sight of this work has the power to touch a hardened soul and cause it to experience the sufferings endured by Jesus Christ in order to redeem it."

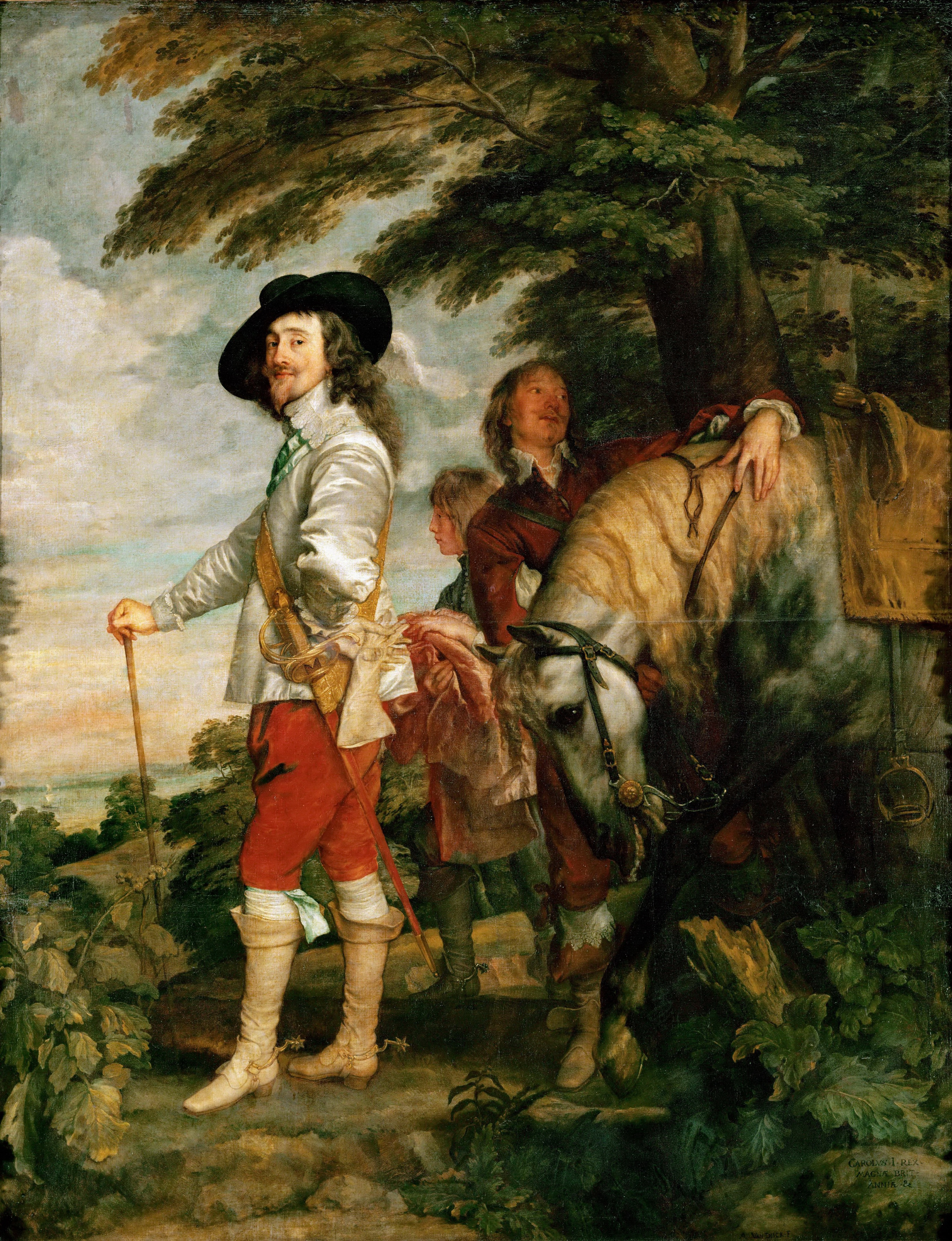
Anthony van Dyck, Portrait of King Charles I, 1635. Louvre, Paris.

== Portraiture ==
Although not predominately a portrait painter, Rubens's contributions include early works such as his Portrait of Brigida Spinola-Doria (1606, National Gallery of Art, Washington, D.C.), paintings of his wives (the Honeysuckle Bower and Het Pelsken), and numerous portraits of friends and nobility. He also exerted a strong influence on Baroque portraiture through his student Anthony van Dyck. Van Dyck became court painter for Charles I of England and was influential on subsequent English portraiture. Other successful portraitists include Cornelis de Vos and Jacob Jordaens. Although most Flemish portraiture is life-sized or monumental, Gonzales Coques and Gillis van Tilborch specialized in small-scale group portraiture.

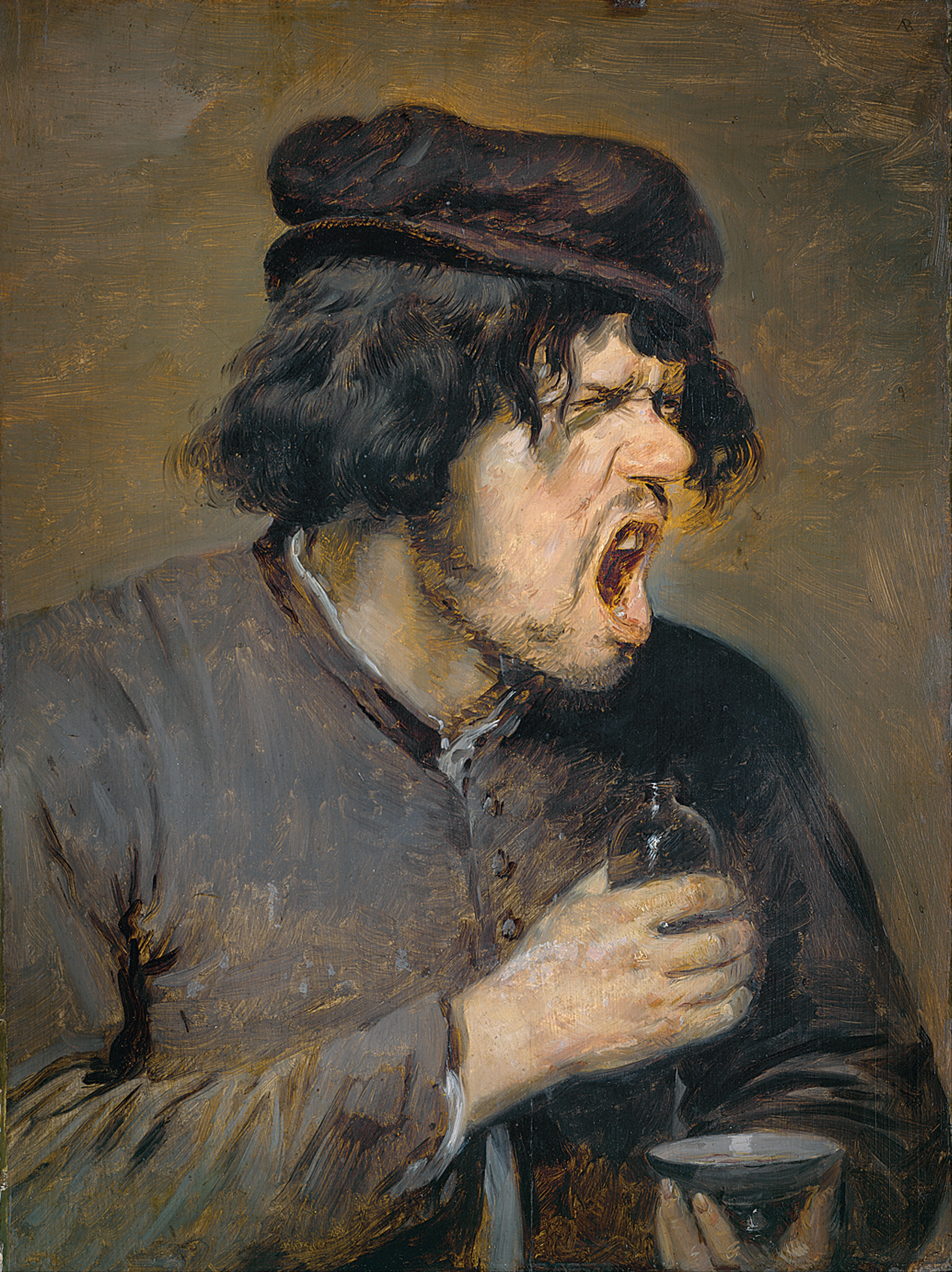
Adriaen Brouwer, The Bitter Drink, c. 1630–1640. Brouwer's expressive peasants are typical of "low-life" genre painting.

== Genre painting ==
Genre paintings, or scenes of everyday life, are common in the 17th century. Many artists follow the tradition of Pieter Bruegel the Elder in depicting "low-life" peasant themes, although elegant "high-life" subjects featuring fashionably-dressed couples at balls or in gardens of love are also common. Adriaen Brouwer, whose small paintings often show peasants fighting and drinking, was particularly influential on subsequent artists. Images of woman performing household tasks, popularized in the northern Netherlands by Pieter de Hooch and Jan Vermeer, is not a significant subject in the south, although artists such as Jan Siberechts explored these themes to some degree.

=== Bruegel tradition ===
Flemish genre painting is strongly tied to the traditions of Pieter Bruegel the Elder and was a style that continued directly into the 17th century through copies and new compositions made by his sons Pieter Brueghel the Younger and Jan Brueghel the Elder. Many of these are kermis paintings and scenes of peasants taking part in other outdoor enjoyments viewed from an elevated viewpoint. Artists in the Dutch Republic, such as the Flemish-born David Vinckboons and Roelandt Savery, also made similar works, popularizing rustic scenes of everyday life closely associated with Dutch and Flemish painting.

=== Adriaen Brouwer and his followers ===
Adriaen Brouwer (1605 or 1606–1638) typically painted small scenes of ragged peasants fighting, gaming, drinking and generally expressing exaggerated and rude behaviour. Born in the Southern Netherlands, Brouwer spent the 1620s in Amsterdam and Haarlem, where he came under the influence of Frans and Dirk Hals and other artists working in a loose painterly manner. Upon his return to Antwerp around 1631 or 1632 he introduced a new, influential format in which the subjects were painted as interior, instead of exterior, scenes. He also painted expressive facial studies like The Bitter Drink (illustrated), a genre called tronies ("faces"). Brouwer's art was recognized in his own lifetime and had a powerful impact on Flemish art. Rubens owned more works by him at the time of his death than any other painter, and artists such as David Teniers the Younger, Jan van de Venne, Joos van Craesbeeck and David Ryckaert III continued to work in a similar manner.

=== Elegant company scenes ===
Paintings of elegant couples in the latest fashions, often with underlying themes of love or the five senses, were commonly painted by Hieronymus Francken the Younger, Louis de Caullery, Simon de Vos, David Teniers the Younger and David Ryckaert III. Rubens's Garden of Love (c. 1634–5; Prado Museum) belongs to these traditions.

=== Monumental genre scenes ===
Whereas elegant company scenes and works by Brouwer and his followers were often small in scale, other artists looked to Caravaggio for inspiration and painted large-scale, theatrically inspired scenes in which musicians, cardplayers, and fortune tellers are pushed to the foreground of the composition. These paintings, like others by Caravaggisti, are generally illuminated by strong lighting effects. Adam de Coster, Gerard Seghers and Theodoor Rombouts were the main exponents of this popular style in the early 17th century, which was popularized by Italian followers of Caravaggio like Bartolomeo Manfredi and Utrecht Caravaggisti like Gerrit van Honthorst. Rombouts was also influenced by his teacher Abraham Janssens, who began incorporating Caravaggesque influences into his history paintings from first decade of the 17th century.

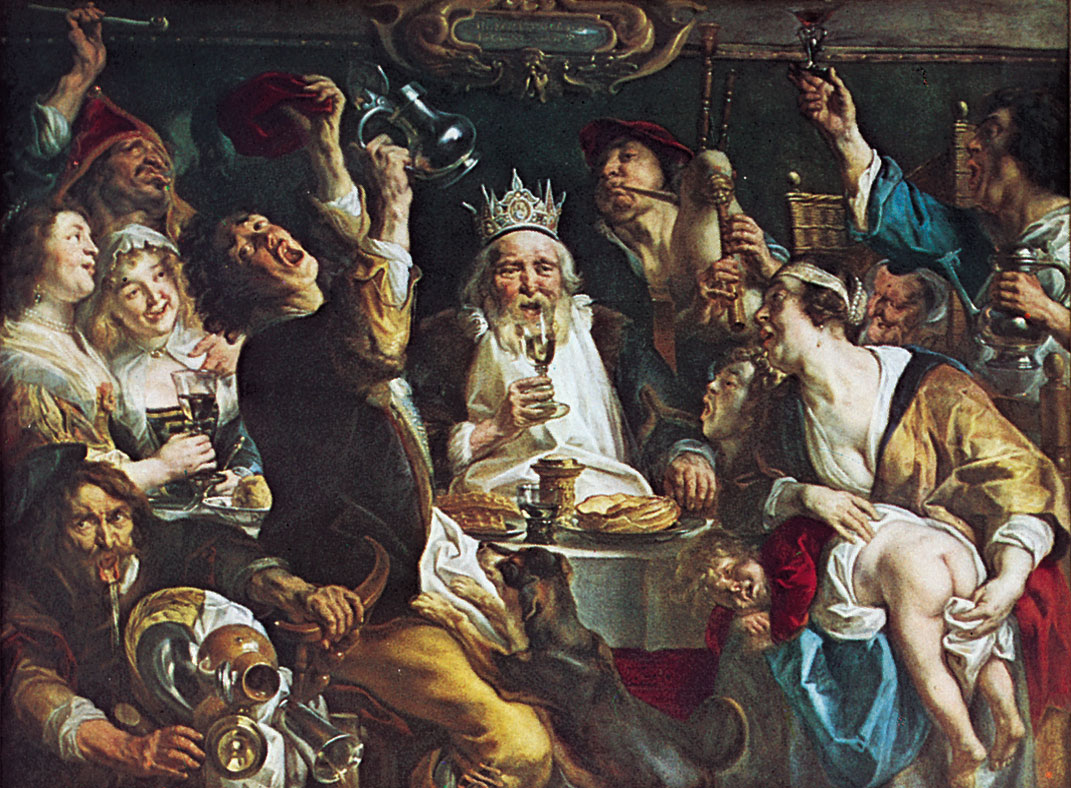
Jacob Jordaens, The King Drinks. Jordeans was well known for his large paintings of moralistic genre scenes, such as this depiction of an Epiphany feast.

=== Jacob Jordaens ===
Jacob Jordaens, who became Antwerp's most important artist after Rubens's death in 1640, is well known for his monumental genre paintings of subjects such as The King Drinks and As the Old Sing, So Pipe the Young. Many of these paintings use compositional and lighting influences similar to those of the Caravaggisti, while the treatment of the subjects inspired Dutch artists like Jan Steen.

=== Battle scenes ===
Another popular type of painting invented in the Low Countries was landscapes with historical and fictional battles, as well as skirmishes and robberies. Sebastiaen Vrancx and his pupil Peter Snayers specialized in this genre, and Snayer's student Adam-Frans van der Meulen continued painting them in Antwerp, Brussels and Paris until the end of the century.

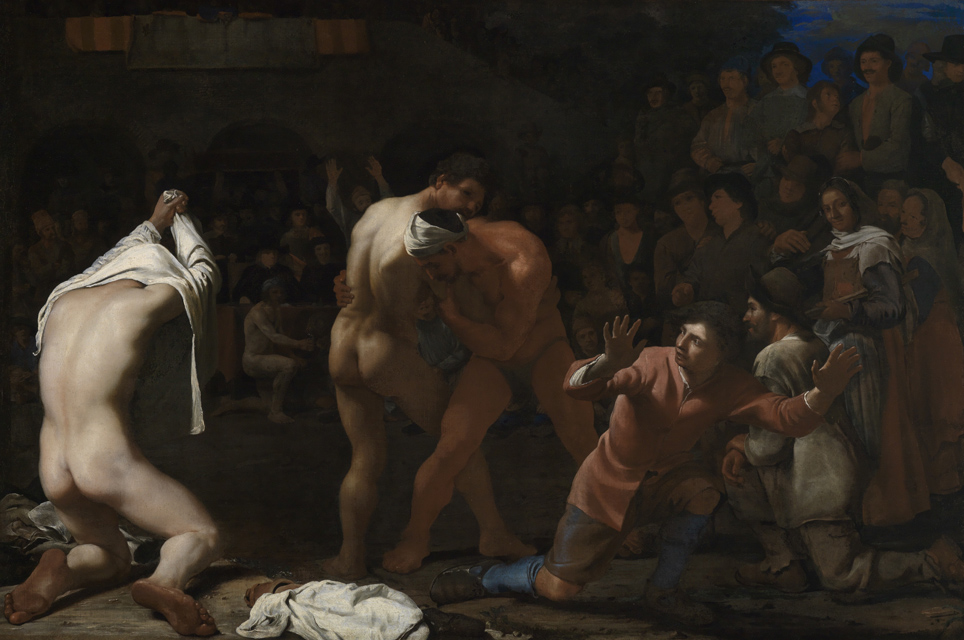
Michael Sweerts, Wrestling Match, 1649. Karlsruhe, Staatliche Kunsthalle. Sweerts's style is influenced by his time in Rome, and in this painting he combines a genre subject with classical poses and Italian coloring

=== Bamboccianti ===
Following a time-honoured tradition, many northern artists travelled to Italy in the 17th century. Flemish artists such as Jan Miel (1599–1664), Michael Sweerts (1618–1664), Anton Goubau (1616–1698) and Willem Reuter (c.1642–1681) went to Rome where they worked for a period of time. Here they were influenced by the works of the genre painters active in Rome referred to as the Bamboccianti. The Bamboccianti comprised mostly Dutch and Flemish artists who had brought existing traditions of depicting peasant subjects from sixteenth-century Netherlandish art with them to Italy, and generally created small cabinet paintings or etchings of the everyday life of the lower classes in Rome and its countryside. The Dutch painter Pieter van Laer who was nicknamed "Il Bamboccio" (meaning "ugly doll" or "puppet" in Italian) had started this type of genre painting in Rome. In general, genre painting was not well-accepted in Italy, especially by official organizations such as the Academy of St. Luke. Many of the painters were also members of the Bentvueghels, the society of mainly Flemish and Dutch artists working in Rome. It acted as a support network for Netherlandish artists in Rome who were in need but is better known for the "bohemian" lifestyle of its members and drunken festivities.

== Landscape and seascape ==
=== Early landscape painting ===
Gillis van Coninxloo was an innovative landscape painter in Antwerp in the late 16th century, who introduced a more natural view instead of the traditional world landscape popularized by earlier painters such as Joachim Patiner. He left a strong influence on northern landscape painting in general through his period in Amsterdam and as a founding member of the Frankenthal School. Forest and mountain landscapes were painted by Abraham Govaerts, Alexander Keirincx, Gijsbrecht Leytens, Tobias Verhaecht and Joos de Momper. Paul Bril settled in Rome, where he specialized as a landscape painter decorating Roman villas and creating small cabinet paintings.

Peter Paul Rubens, Landscape with view of 'Het Steen', 1636

=== Rubens and later painters ===
Jan Wildens and Lucas van Uden painted natural landscapes inspired by Rubens, and frequently collaborated with figure painters or animal specialists to paint the backgrounds. Rubens turned to landscape painting in the 1630s, focusing on the area around his chateau, Het Steen. A well-known example is the Landscape with a view of 'Het Steen' (National Gallery of London).

=== Marine painting ===
Small seascapes (zeekens) were another popular theme. Artists such as Bonaventura Peeters painted shipwrecks and atmospheric views of ships at sea, as well as imaginary views of exotic ports. Hendrik van Minderhout, who was from Rotterdam and settled in Antwerp, continued this latter theme contemporaneous with developments of marine painting in the Dutch Republic.

== Architectural painting ==
Interior architectural views, usually of churches, developed out of the late sixteenth-century works of Hans Vredeman de Vries. Many were actual locations. Pieter Neeffs I, for example, made numerous interiors of the Cathedral of Our Lady, Antwerp. Hendrik van Steenwijk II, on the other hand, followed Vredeman's precedent in painting imaginary interiors. The genre continued in the later seventeenth century by Anton Ghering and Wilhelm Schubert van Ehrenberg, but the Flemish examples do not demonstrate the same level of innovation found in the Dutch perspectives of Pieter Jansz Saenredam or Emanuel de Witte.

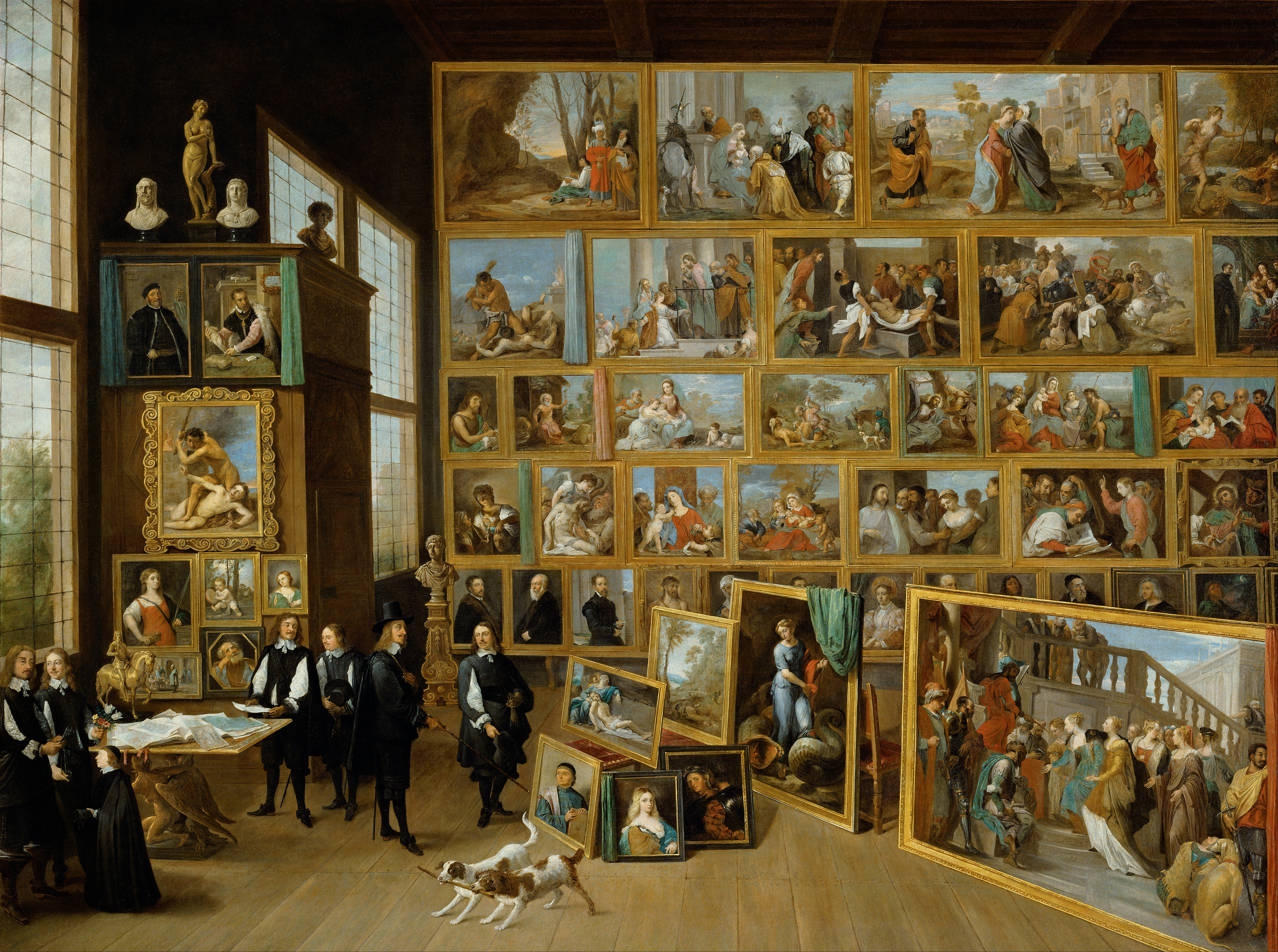
David Teniers the Younger, The Archduke Leopold Wilhelm in his gallery in Brussels. Teniers documented the archduke's collection of paintings in this work while he was court painter in Brussels.

== Gallery and art collection painting ==
Gallery paintings appeared in Antwerp around 1610, and developed—like architectural interiors—from the compositions of Hans Vredeman de Vries. One of the earliest innovators of this new genre was Frans Francken the Younger, who introduced the type of work known as the Preziosenwand (wall of treasures). In these, prints, paintings, sculptures, drawings, as well as collectable objects from the natural world like shells and flowers are collected together in the foreground against a wall that imitates encyclopedic cabinets of curiosities. A similar variation of these collections of artistic wealth are the series of the five senses created by Jan Brueghel the Elder and Rubens (Prado Museum, Madrid). Willem van Haecht (1593–1637) developed another variation in which illustrations of actual artworks are displayed in a fantasy art gallery, while connoisseurs and art lovers admire them.

Later in the century, David Teniers the Younger, working in the capacity of court painter to Archduke Leopold Wilhelm of Austria, documented the archduke's collection of Italian paintings in Brussels as gallery painters as well as in a printed catalogue–the Theatrum Pictorium. Flemish Gallery and art collection paintings have been interpreted as a kind of visual theory of art. Such paintings continued to be made in Antwerp by Gerard Thomas (1663–1721) and Balthasar van den Bossche (1681–1715), and foreshadow the development of the veduta in Italy and the galleries of Giovanni Paolo Pannini.

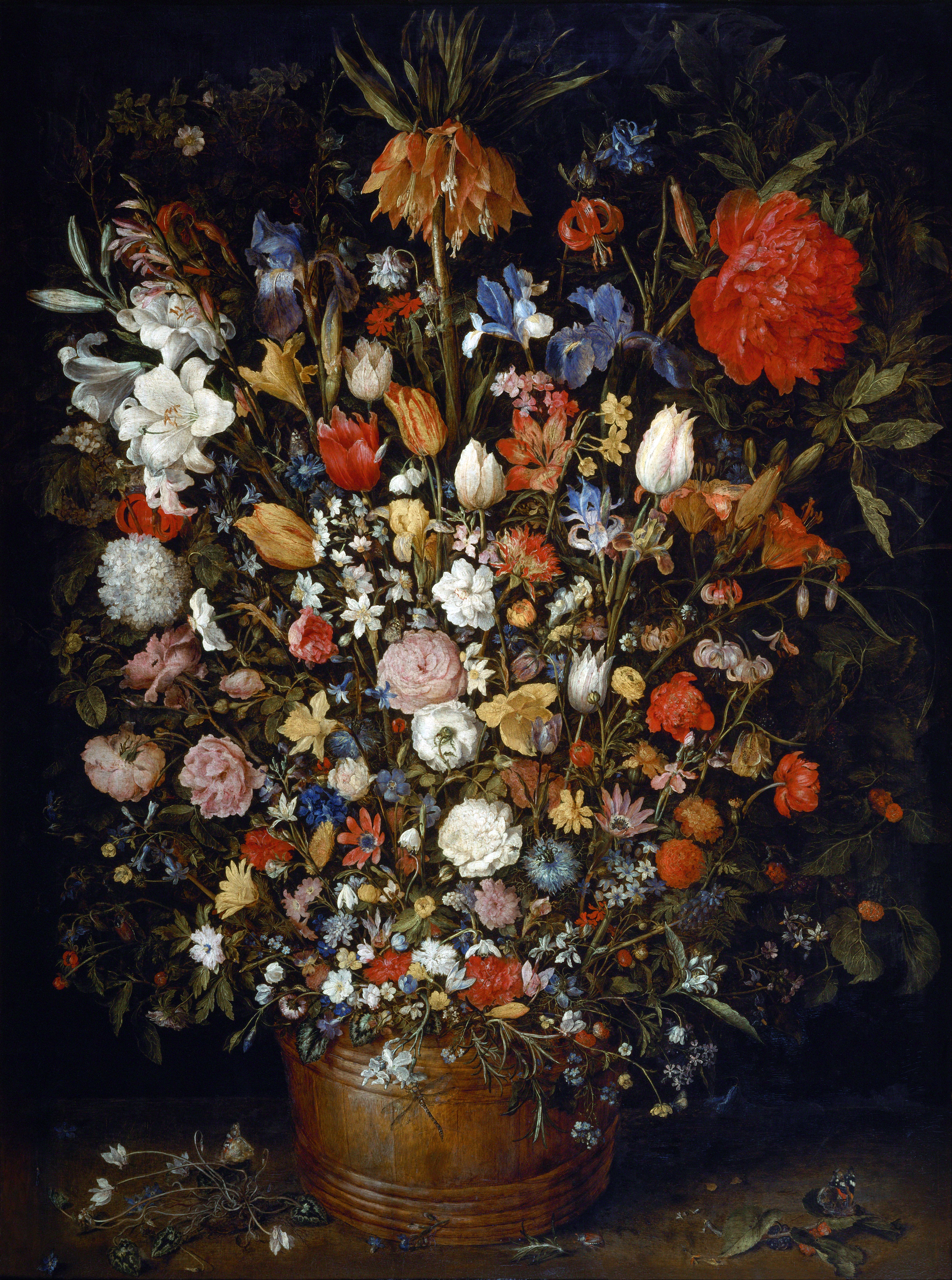
Jan Brueghel the Elder, Flower Still Life, 1606/7. Brueghel was an innovator of the flower still life genre.

== Still life and animal painting ==
=== Flower painting ===
Jan Brueghel the Elder was one of the important innovators of the floral still life around 1600. These paintings, which presented immaculately observed arrangements and compositions, were imaginary creations of flowers that bloom at different times of the years. They were popular with leading patrons and nobility across Europe, and generally have an underlying Vanitas motif. The compositions of Brueghel's paintings were also influential on later Dutch flower pieces. Brueghel's sons Jan Brueghel the Younger and Ambrosius Brueghel were also flower specialists. Osias Beert (1580–1624) was another flower painter at the beginning of the 17th century. His paintings share many similarities with northern contemporaries such as Ambrosius Bosschaert the Elder.

=== Garland painting ===
Closely related to the flower still life is the flower garland genre of painting that was invented by Jan Brueghel in collaboration with cardinal Federico Borromeo in Milan. The early versions of these paintings, such as the collaboration by Breughel and Rubens in Munich (Alte Pinakothek, Munich) show the Virgin Mary and Christ child surrounded by a garland of flowers. They have been interpreted as distinctly Counter Reformation images, with the flowers emphasizing the delicacy of the Virgin and Child–images of which were destroyed in large numbers during the iconoclastic outbreaks of 1566. Brueghel's student, the Jesuit painter Daniel Seghers, also painted many of these types of works for an international clientele. In later versions, the fleshy Madonna and Child gave way to sculptural niches and even pagan themes.

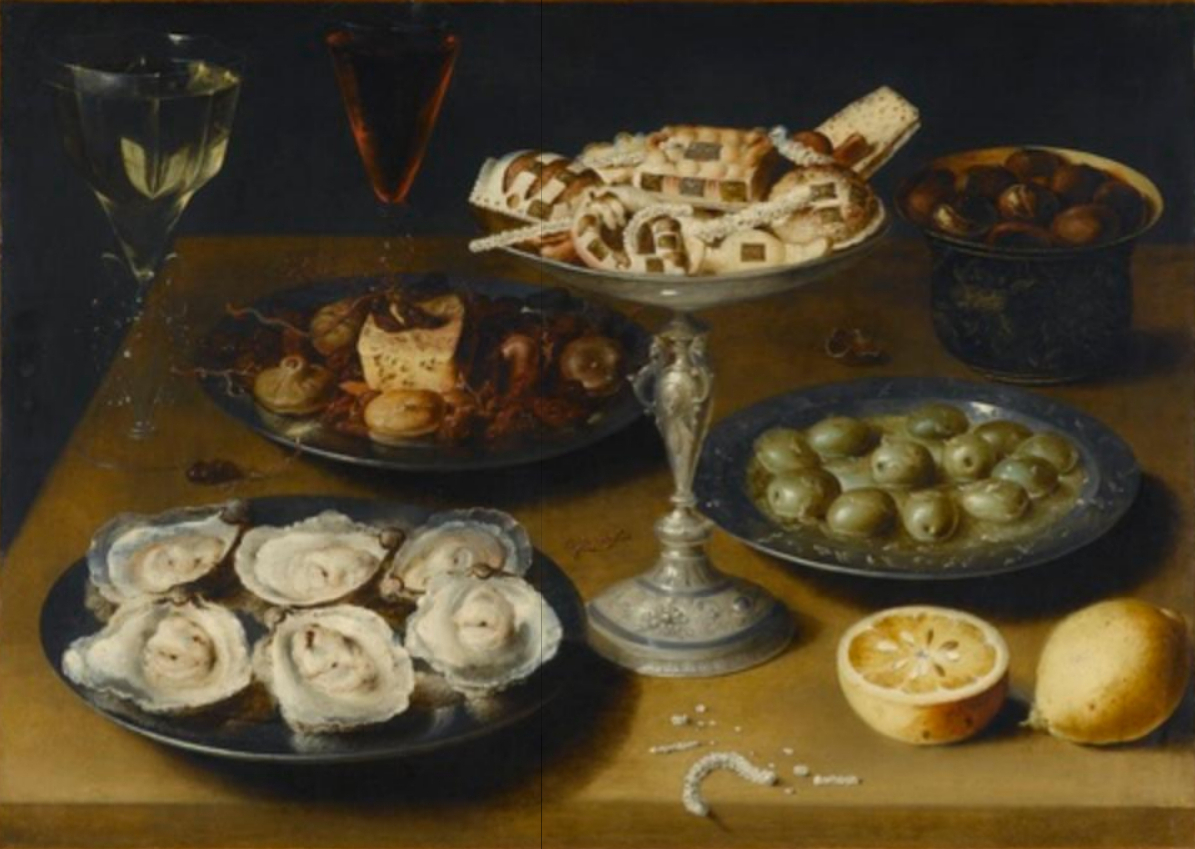
Osias Beert, Still life with oysters, c. 1610. Staatsgalerie Stuttgart. Beert's still lifes are typical of the "breakfast" type painted early in the 17th century.

=== Breakfast and banquet still life ===
The ontbijtje, or "little breakfast", is a type of still life that was popular in both the northern and southern Netherlands showing a variety of eating and drinking vessels and foods such as cheese and bread against a neutral background. Osias Beert, Clara Peeters, Cornelis Mahu and Jacob Foppens van Es (c. 1596–1666) were all artists who made these types of painting. More elaborate are the pronk, or "sumptuous", still life. This style developed in the Dutch Republic, and was brought to Antwerp by Jan Davidsz de Heem. They show, on a larger scale than earlier works, complex compositions of expensive items, rare foods, and fleshy, peeling fruit. These paintings are related to vanitas and transience motifs.

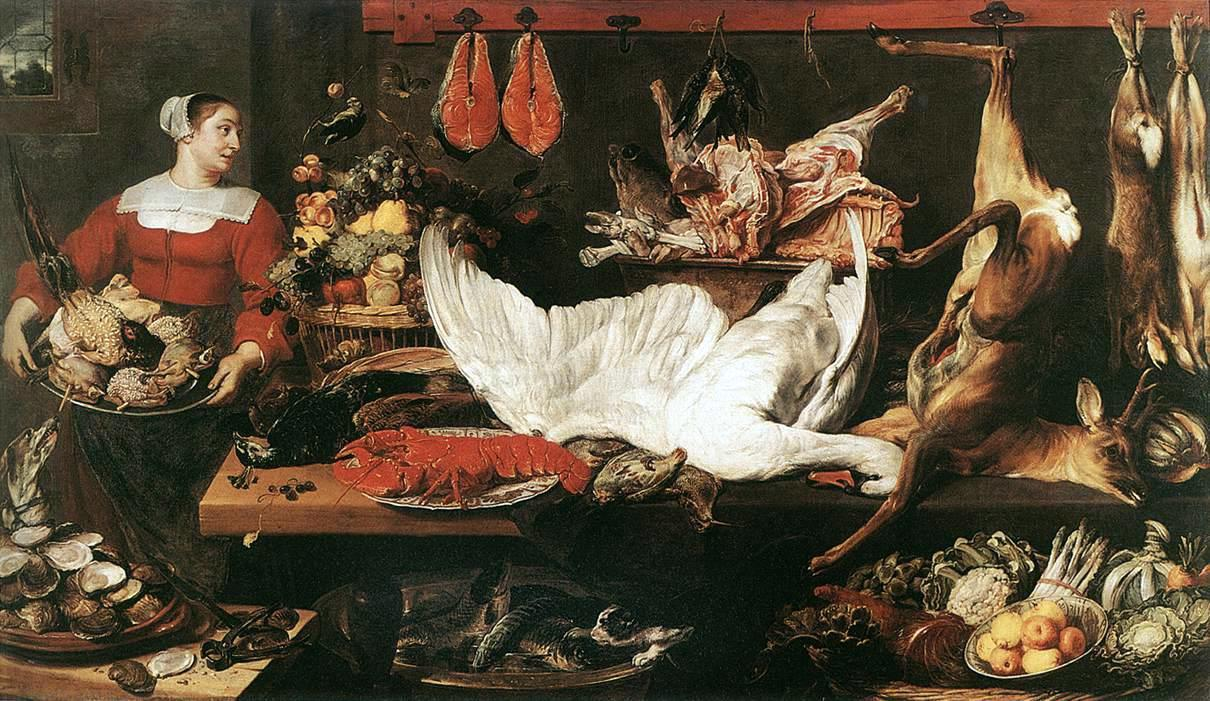
Frans Snyders, The Pantry, c. 1620.

=== Animal still life ===
Frans Snyders (1579–1657) painted large still lifes focusing on dead game and animals. His compositions, along with those of his follower Adriaen van Utrecht (1599–1652). look back to the sixteenth-century paintings of Pieter Aertsen and Joachim Beuckelaer, but instill that tradition with a High Baroque monumentality. Subsequent artists, Jan Fyt and Pieter Boel further elaborated on this type by including a noticeable mixture of living animals and dead game. These latter paintings are closely related to images of the hunt, which came into fashion in Flemish painting during the 17th century.

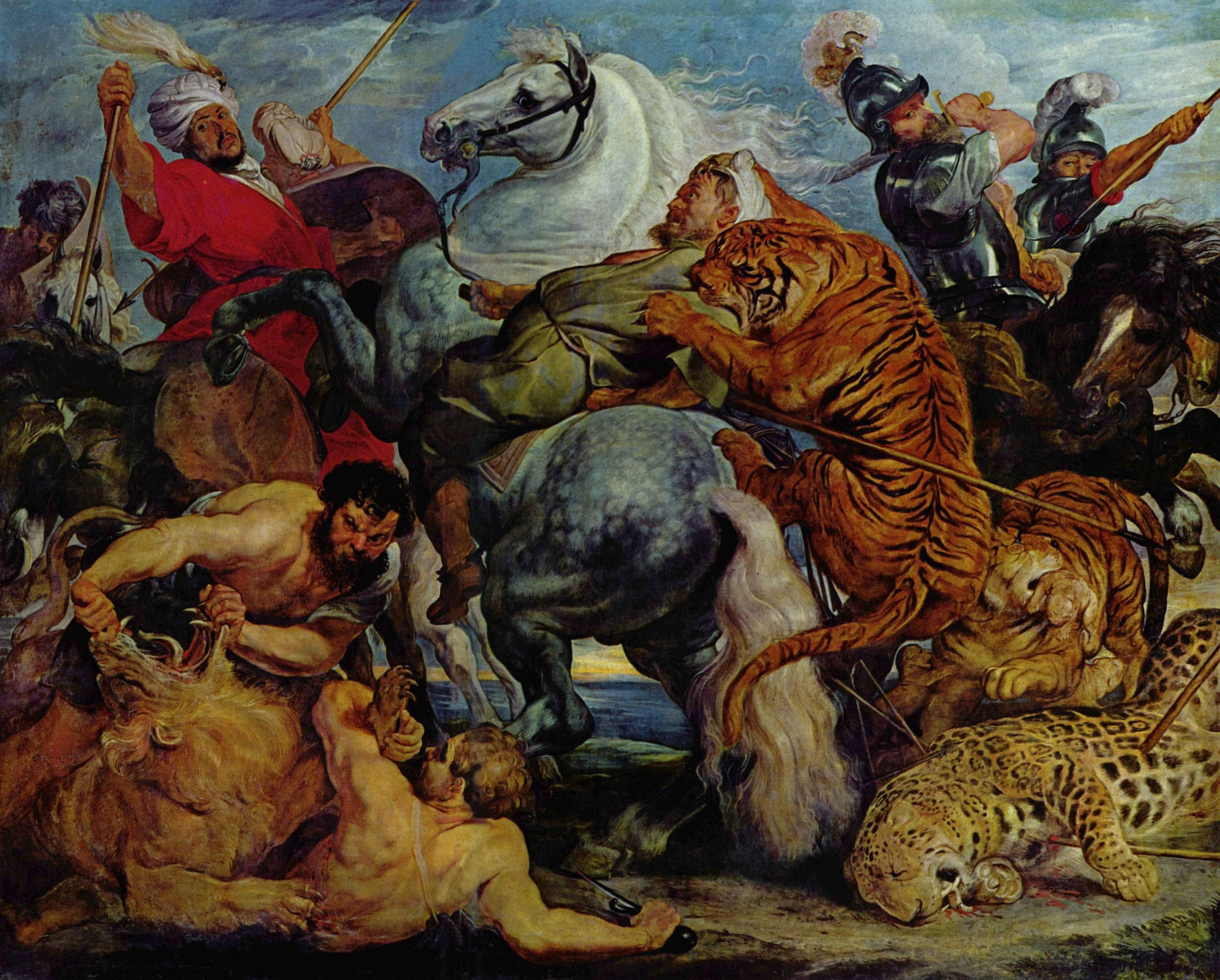
Peter Paul Rubens, The Tiger, Leopard and Lion Hunt, c. 1617–1618. Musée des Beaux Arts, Rennes. This painting is typical of Rubens's "exotic" hunts painted between about 1615 and 1625.

== Hunting scenes ==
Rubens introduced the monumental hunt to Flemish art, depicting on a large scale a close battle inspired by his study of classical antiquity and Leonardo da Vinci's Battle of Anghiari. These works show both noble hunts, such as the Wolf and Fox Hunt (Metropolitan Museum of Art), and exotic hunts, such as the Lion Hunt (Alte Pinakothek, Munich). Frans Snyders and Paul de Vos created similarly large paintings which are distinct from Rubens's works in their focus on the animals and absence of human participation.

== Cabinet painting ==
Small, intricate paintings, usually depicting history and biblical subjects, were produced in great numbers in the Southern Netherlands throughout the 17th century. Many were created by anonymous artists, however artists such as Jan Brueghel the Elder, Hendrik van Balen, Frans Francken the Younger and Hendrik de Clerck were all successful cabinet painters during the first half of the 17th century. These artists, as well as followers of Adam Elsheimer like David Teniers the Elder, remained partly shaped by continued mannerist stylistic tendencies. However, Rubens influenced a number of later artists who incorporated his Baroque style into the small context of these works. Among them are Frans Wouters, Jan Thomas van Ieperen, Simon de Vos, Pieter van Lint, and Willem van Herp. These small paintings were traded widely throughout Europe, and by way of Spain to Latin America.

== See also ==
- Antwerp school
- List of Flemish painters
- Flemish painting

== Sources ==
- Belkin, Kristin Lohse (1998). Rubens. London: Phaidon Press. ISBN 0-7148-3412-2
- Martin, J. R. (1977). Baroque. New York: Harper & Row. ISBN 0-06-435332-X
- Slive, S. (1995). Dutch painting 1600-1800. Yale University Press Pelican history of art. New Haven, Conn: Yale University Press. ISBN 0-300-06418-7
- Sutton, P. C., & Wieseman, M. E. (1993). The Age of Rubens. Boston: Museum of Fine Arts in association with Ghent. ISBN 0-8109-1935-4
- Vlieghe, Hans (1998). Flemish Art and Architecture, 1585-1700. Yale University Press Pelican history of art. New Haven: Yale University Press. ISBN 0-300-07038-1
