= Willem van Herp =

Flemish painter

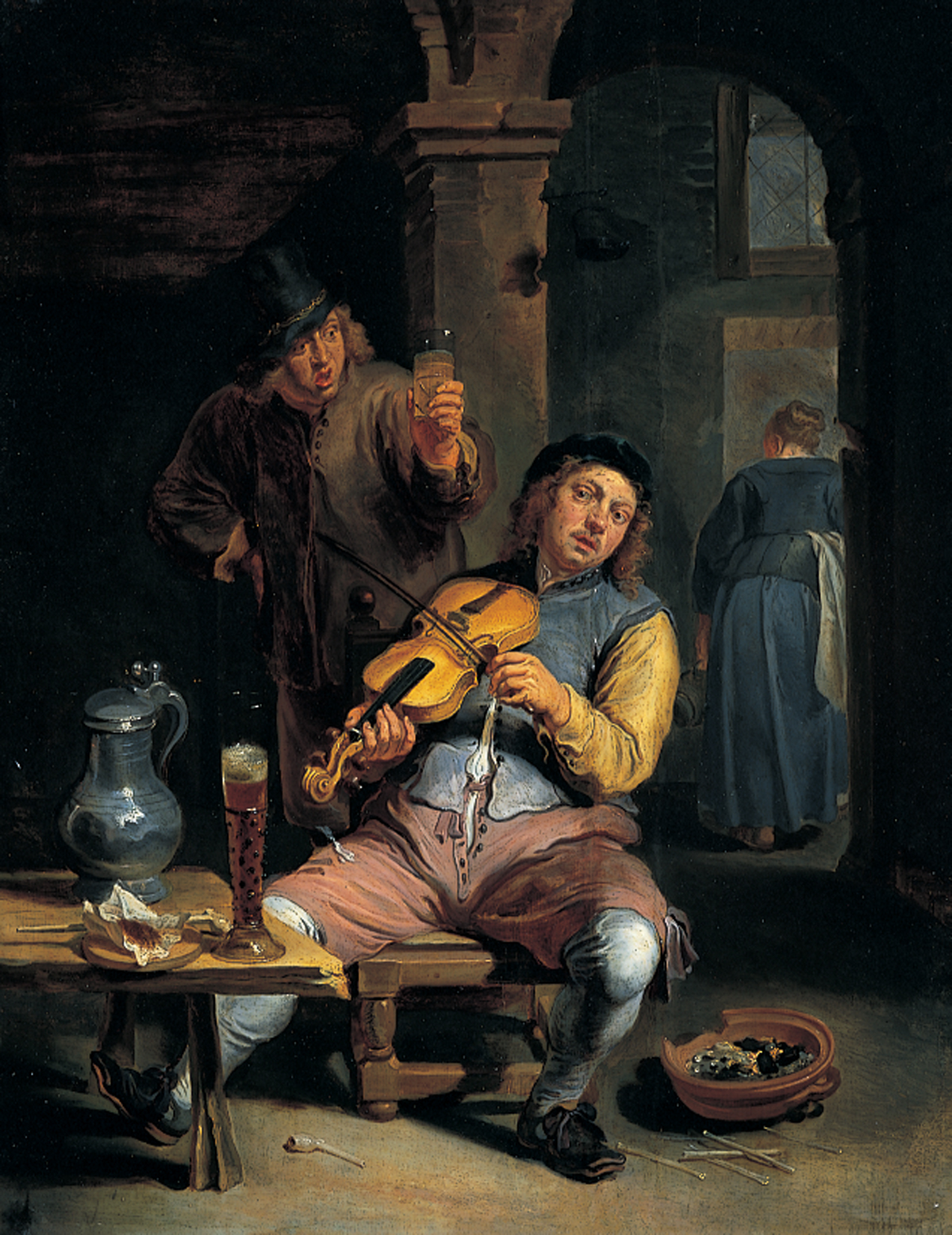
The blind fiddler

Willem van Herp (I) or Willem van Herp the Elder (variations on first name: 'Guilliam', 'Gilliam' and 'Guillaume') (c. 1614 in Antwerp – 1677) was a Flemish Baroque painter specializing in religious paintings and small cabinet paintings of "low-life" genre scenes. He operated a large workshop and through his good connections with Antwerp art dealers helped spread the Flemish Baroque style internationally.

== Life ==
For a long time Willem van Herp was believed to have been a pupil of Peter Paul Rubens. Even though he was not his pupil he did borrow many of Rubens' motifs and touched up copies after Rubens for the art dealer Matthijs Musson. He is said to have trained with the minor artists Damiaan Wortelmans II and Hans Biermans.

Van Herp may have spent some time abroad after his training. He was listed as an independent master in the Guild of St. Luke beginning in 1637. He spent his entire career in Antwerp.

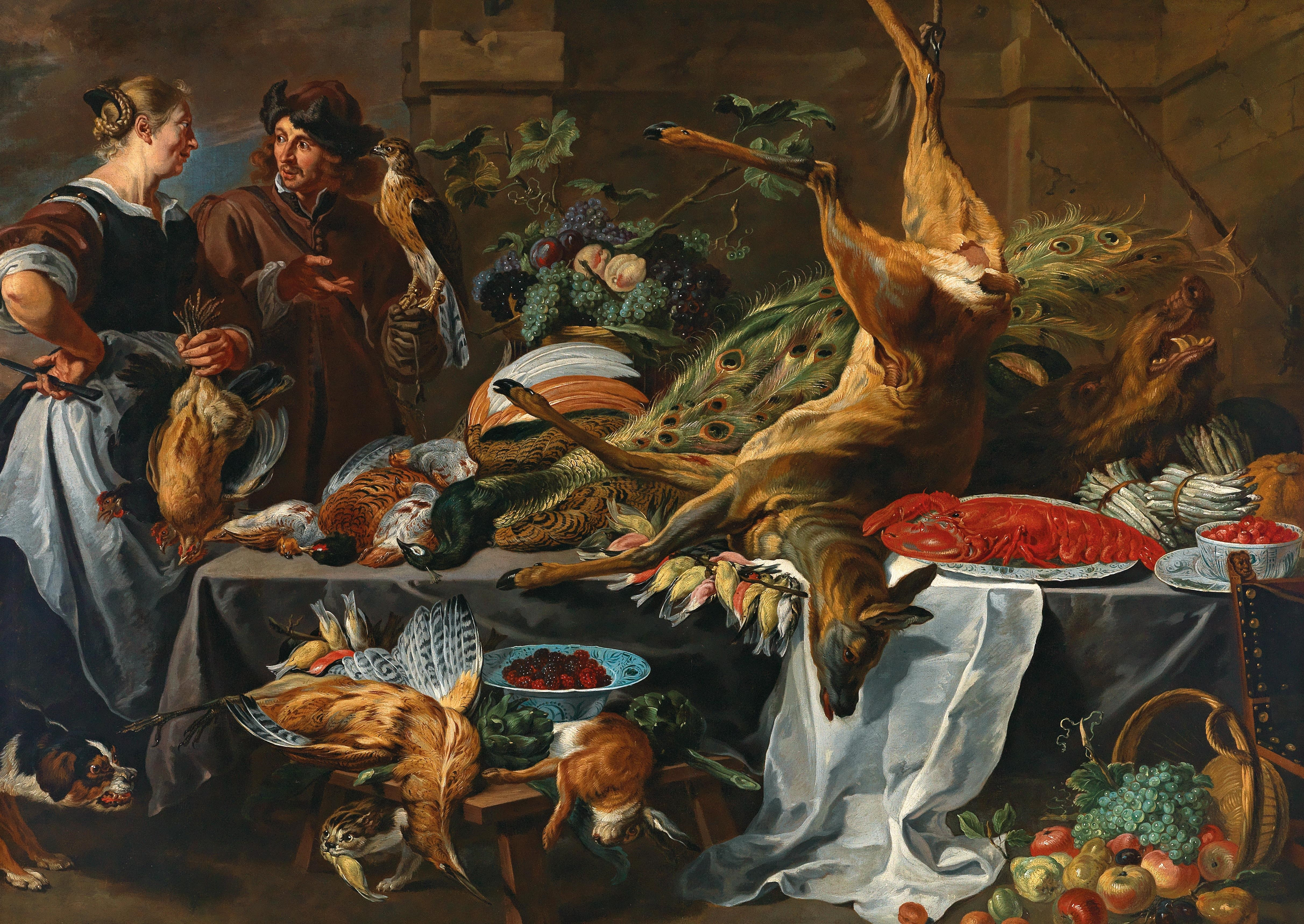
Larder with two figures

He married Maria Wolffort, daughter of the painter Artus Wolffort. He was the father of Norbertus en Willem (II) van Herp, who both became painters, and daughters Maria Anna and Anna Maria.

He was the master of his son Norbertus and Melchior Hamers.

== Work ==
=== General ===
Van Herp painted mainly genre scenes and religious compositions. It is not possible to discern a development in his style since he only dated a few of his pictures. His style is characterised by its somewhat mannered way of drawing and the expressiveness of the figures. His large output point to a large workshop with an almost industrial operation.

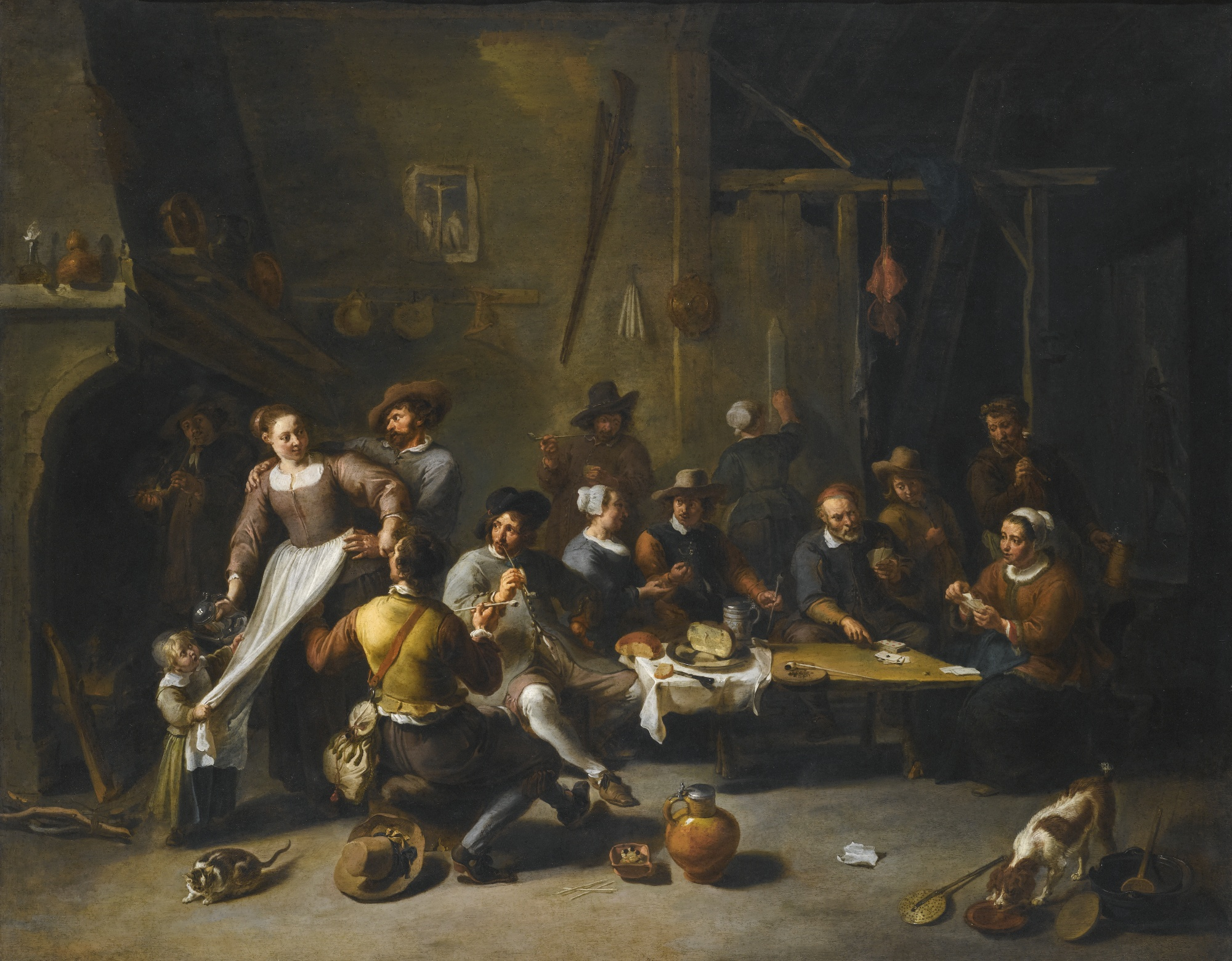
Tavern with merrymakers and card players

Many of his paintings can be regarded as copies or pastiches of original compositions by Antwerp painters such as Rubens, Anthony van Dyck, Jacob Jordaens, Gerard Seghers, Jan Boeckhorst, Hendrick van Balen, Erasmus Quellinus the Younger, Gaspar de Crayer and Artus Wolffort as well as of Italian masters such as Raffael and Guido Reni.

=== Typical works ===
Typical examples of his work are the painting A Poor Company at Table in a Rustic Kitchen held by the National Trust at Tyntesfield and oil on copper religious paintings, such as Daniel in the Lion's Den (c. 1650, Los Angeles County Museum of Art). In the former, a genre scene, the figures demonstrate a small-scale use of Rubensean figures in an interior reminiscent of contemporary works by David Teniers the Younger.

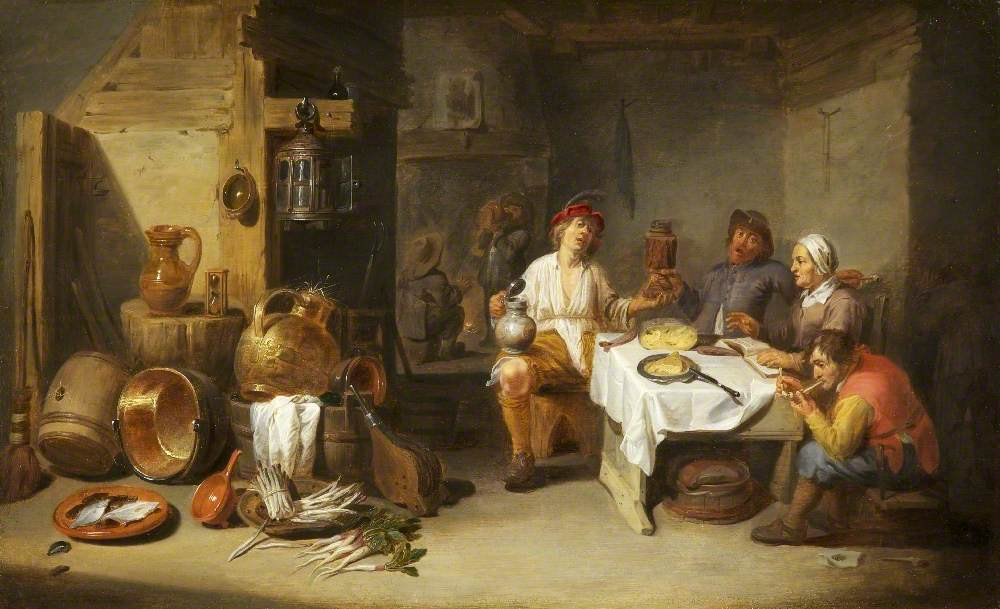
A poor company at a table in a rustic kitchen

The latter is more representative of the small religious scenes on copper that make up most of his oeuvre, with a highly polished finish and borrowings from Rubens' treatment of the same subject. He also painted large altarpieces of churches in Flanders such as in Antwerp, Herentals, Ostend and Londerzeel.

Many of his paintings can be regarded as copies or pastiches of original compositions by Antwerp painters such as Rubens, Anthony van Dyck, Jacob Jordaens, Gerard Seghers, Jan Boeckhorst, Hendrick van Balen, Erasmus Quellinus the Younger, Gaspar de Crayer and Artus Wolffort as well as of Italian masters such as Raffael and Guido Reni. He often worked from prints made after the works of these masters to create his own compositions. An example is the Baptism of Christ (Prado Museum), which is based on a print after Rafael.

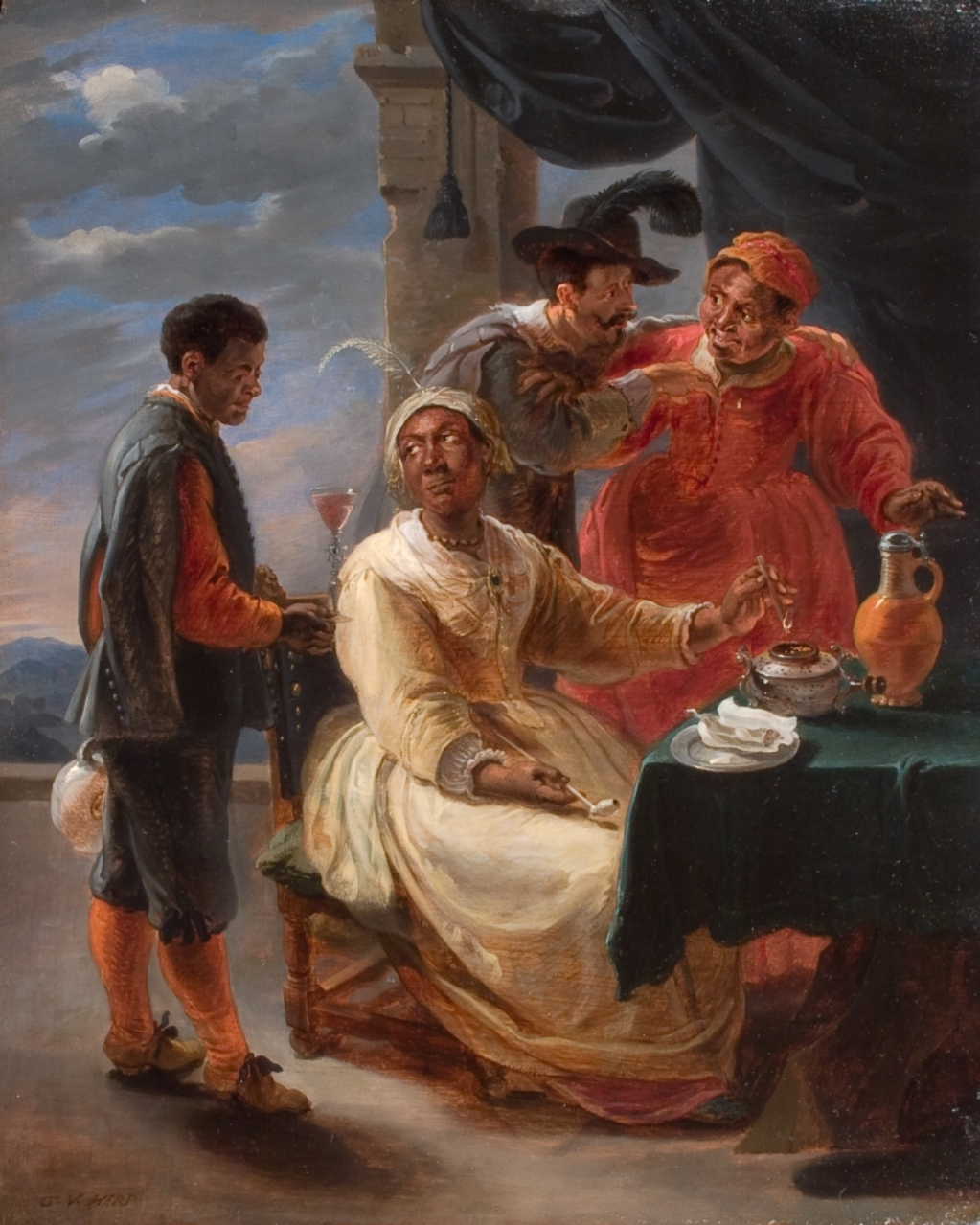
Bordello scene

=== Collaborations ===
As was the custom at the time, he regularly collaborated with other painters. He worked with Jan van Kessel the Elder, Lambert de Hondt the Elder and Guillam Forchondt in the production of landscapes (painted by the other artist) with figures (painted by van Herp). Examples are The departure of the Israelites, St. Anthony Preaching to the Animals and Noli me tangere. These paintings are similar in composition and are a variation of the type of the so-called 'paradise landscape'. Paradise landscapes depict the Garden of Eden as described in the Book of Genesis, filled with all the animals, fish and birds that were believed to be God's creation. The type was invented and popularized by Jan Brueghel the Younger.

=== Works on copper ===
Although only moderately successful in Antwerp, as suggested by the infrequent occurrence of his paintings in local inventories, many of his small works were probably intended as export items destined for Spain. Most of these were on copper, a material for painting that was highly prized both for durability and its glossy finish in Spain.

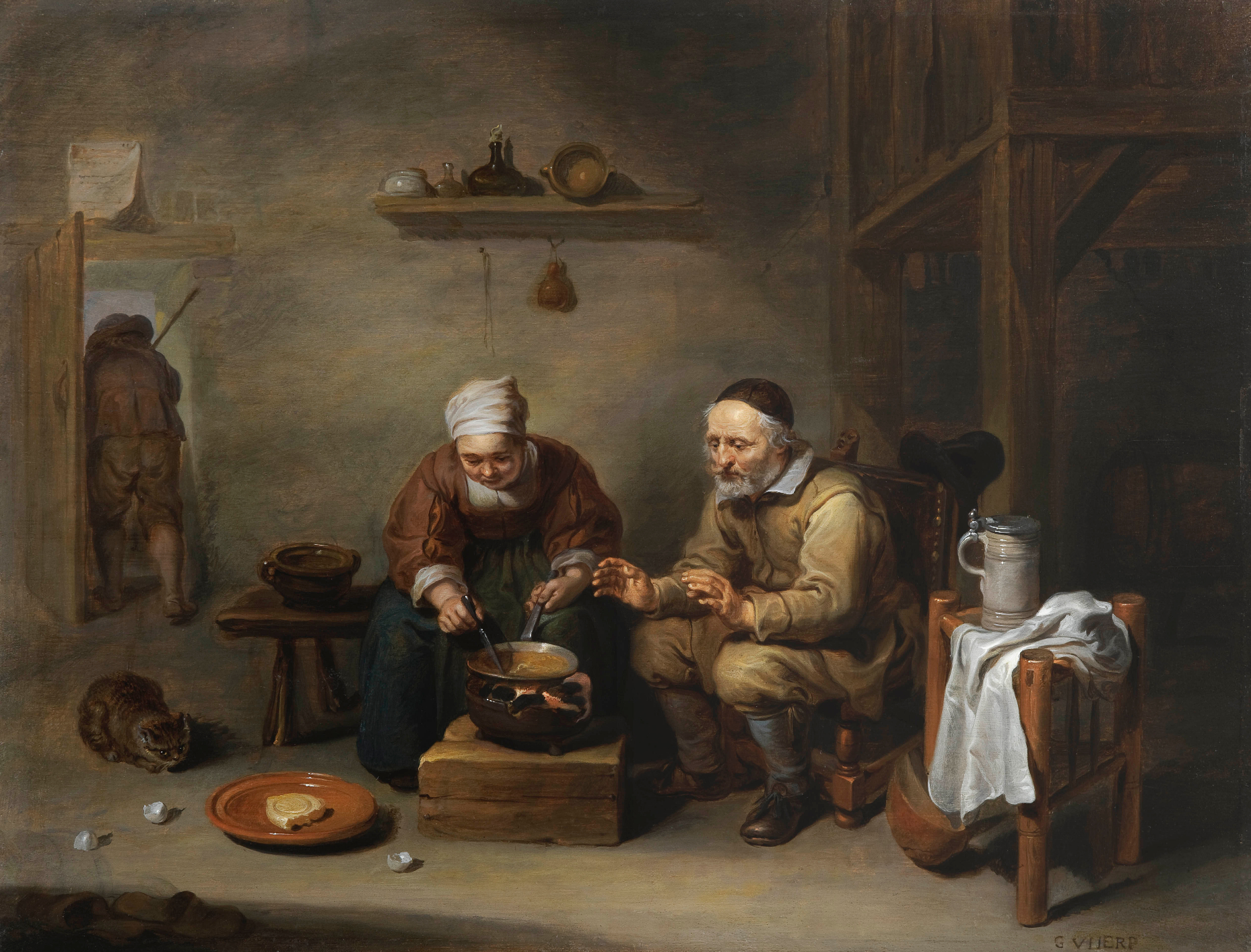
Old couple in a rustic interior

Van Herp's works were influential in spreading copper painting in Mexico by way of trade from Spain to Latin America, and reflect a taste for small paintings reminiscent of Rubens' style abroad. He also became well known in England through engravings after his works, in particular of his genre scenes.

=== Tapestry designs ===
Van Herp also produced designs for tapestries. In 1663 he was together with Jan van Kessel the Elder, David Teniers the Younger and Luigi Primo one of the painters who painted on copper a six-part series representing the history of the Moncada family. These were used as designs for tapestries manufactured in Brussels.
