= Paul Liégeois =

French painter

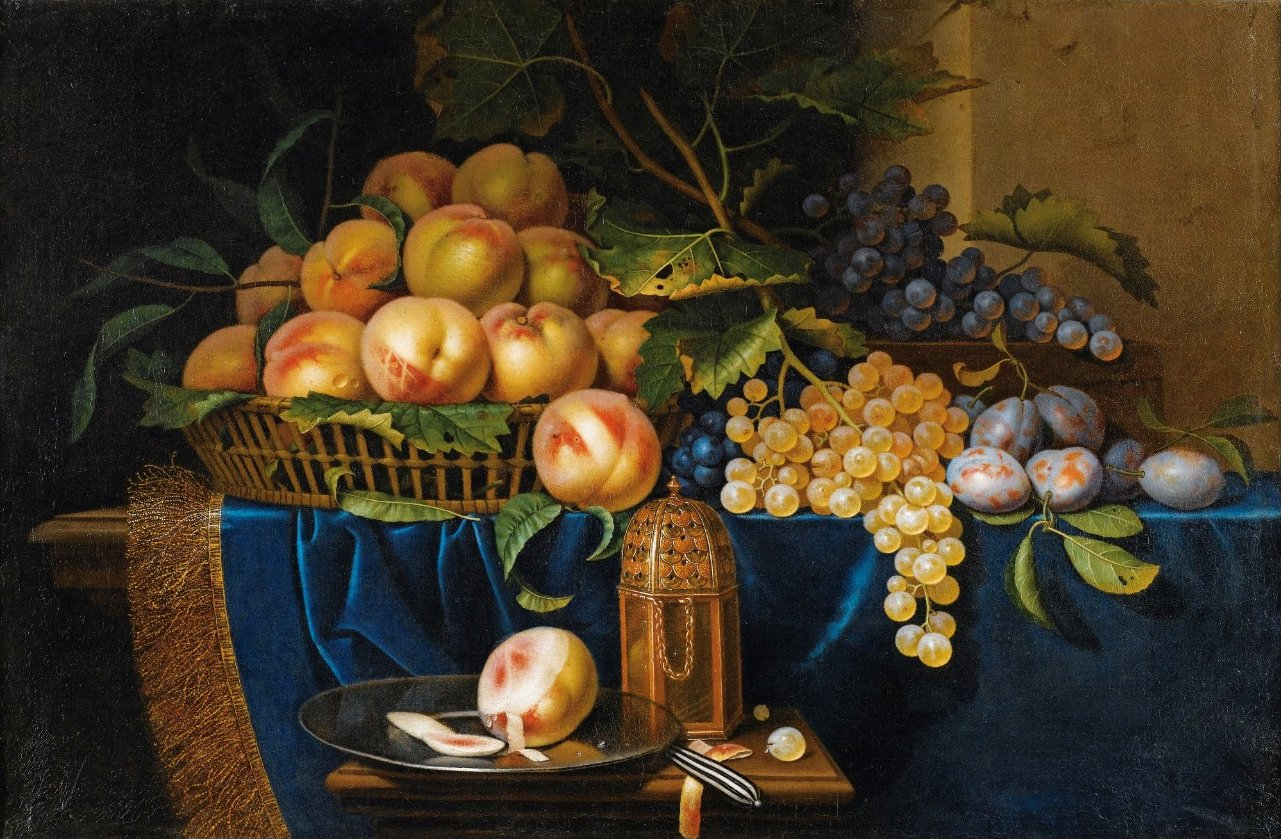
Still Life With Peaches, Grapes, Plums and Silver-Gilt Shaker.

Paul Liégeois (fl. 1650–1670) was a French still-life painter, active in Paris. He was probably of Flemish origin, as suggested by his name.

== Life and work ==
The details of his life remain very poorly known. He seems to have been relatively successful and his works were acquired by many amateur art collectors. The famous painter, Philippe de Champaigne is known to have made positive comments about his work and he was a friend of the noted miniaturist and engraver, Jacques Bailly. According to surviving records, he also received commissions from the rural minor nobility.

His work marks a transitional phase from the realistic still lifes that dominated the first half of the 17th Century (represented by Louise Moillon, Lubin Baugin, Jacques Linard and François Garnier), and the generation that came to maturity during the reign of King Louis XIV (such as Jean-Baptiste Monnoyer and Jean-Baptiste Belin), who favored more theatrical, detailed and decorative compositions.

He excelled in the representation of fruit, especially peaches and grapes, whose textures he faithfully rendered. Unlike his contemporaries, he eschewed obviously symmetrical compositions; favoring a disorderly effect with textural contrasts that made the arrangements look spontaneous. His dark palette and emphasis on blues bring to mind the work of another still-life painter, Dutch Golden Age artist Willem van Aelst, who was active in Paris at the same time.

His works may be seen at the Louvre, Musée des beaux-arts de Chambéry and the Musée des Beaux-Arts de Rouen. Many are in private collections.

== Sources ==
- Michel Faré, Le Grand Siècle de la Nature-morte en France, Office Du Livre, 1974, p. 74 ISBN 978-2-85109-012-6
- Claudia Salvi, D'après nature : la nature-morte en France au XVIIe siècle, éd. Renaissance du livre, 2000 ISBN 978-2-8046-0408-0
