= Peter van Boucle =

Flemish Baroque painter

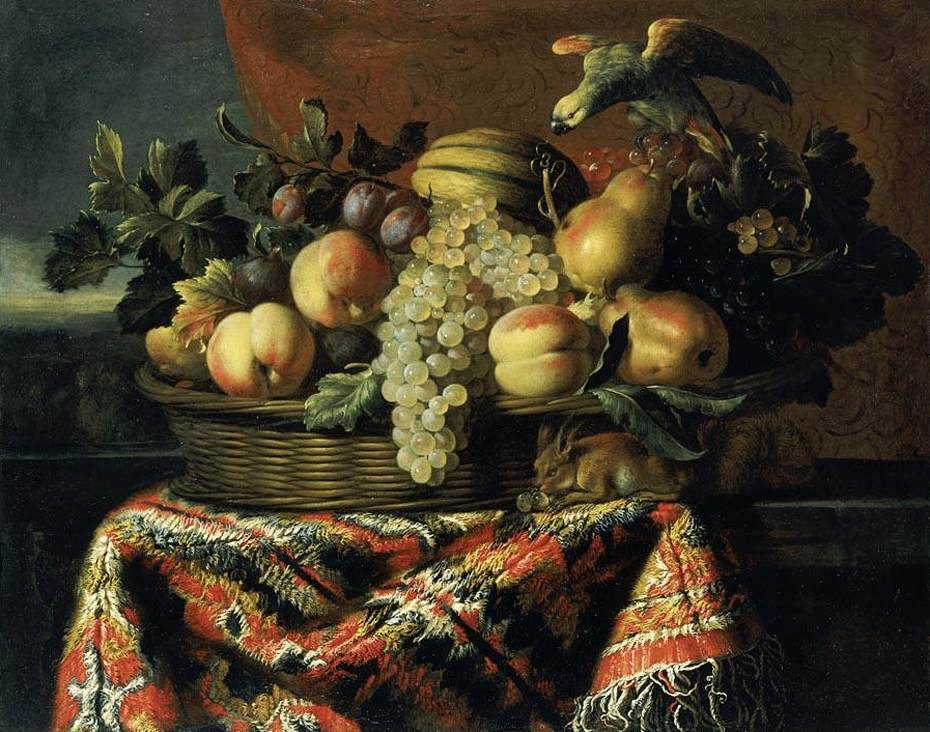
Still life

Peter van Boucle (between 1600 en 1610 (?), probably Antwerp – 1673, Paris) was a Flemish Baroque painter who worked for a large part of his life in Paris where he was one of the most prolific Flemish still life painters.

== Life ==
There is little information available about the life and training of Peter van Boucle. He claimed that he was a pupil of Frans Snyders but there are no written sources available in Antwerp that support this contention. However, there are stylistic similarities in his works which suggest that he worked in the vicinity of Frans Snijders.

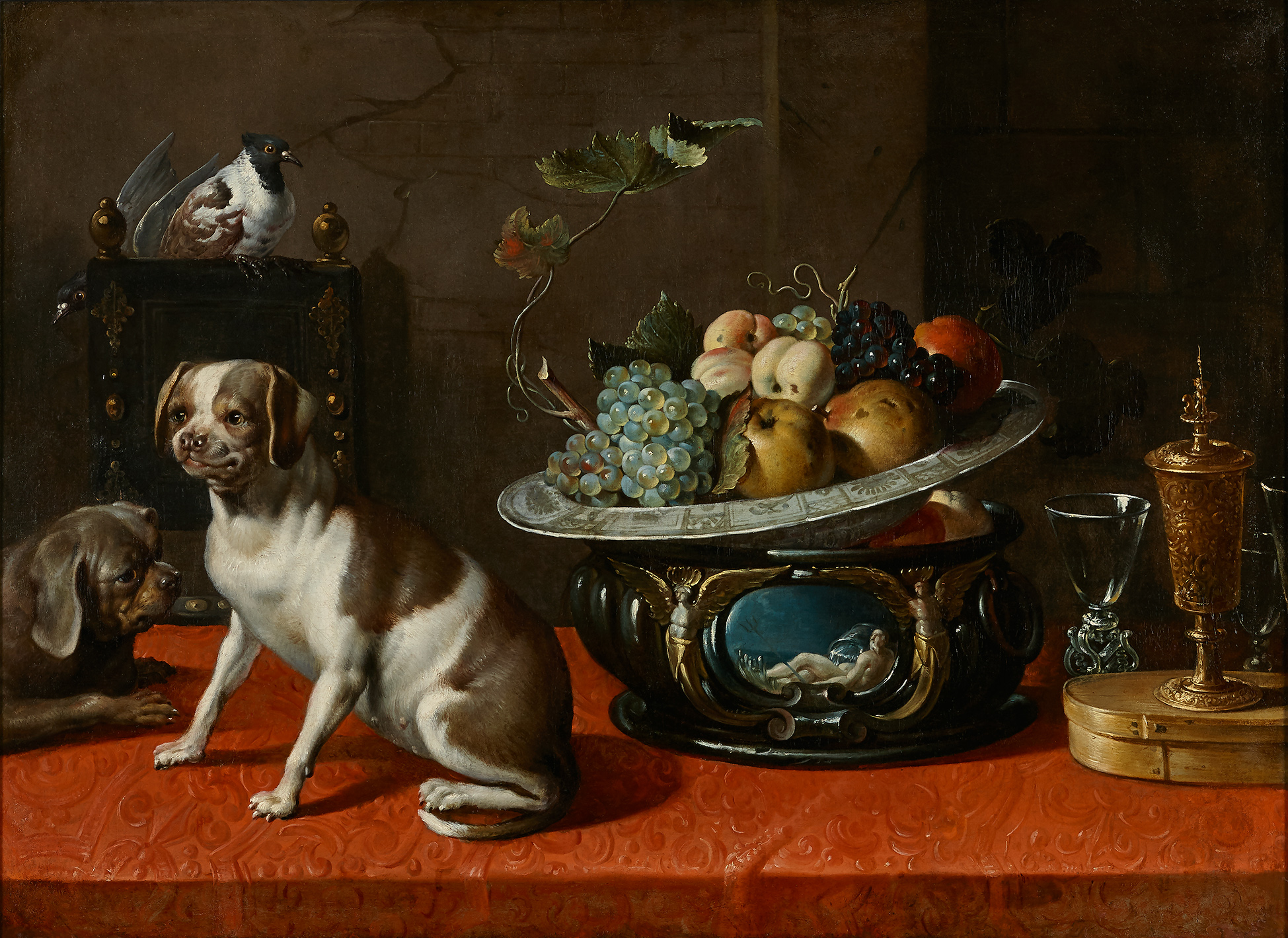
Still life of fruits and glassware with two dogs

Van Boucle's father Carel was an engraver, who had become a master in the Guild of St. Luke of Antwerp in 1603 and emigrated to Paris in 1617. Peter van Boucle was registered with his father in Paris in 1623. At that time many Flemish artists were active in the Parisian district of Saint-Germain des-Près.

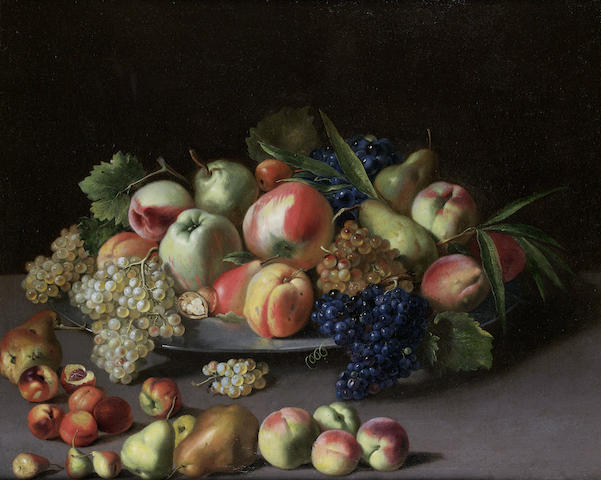
Apples, pears, grapes and peaches on a pewter dish on a table top

He worked for a while with the still life painter Lubin Baugin in the studio of Simon Vouet. Here they made designs for tapestries (which have not been located). He probably also was familiar with the still life painters Jacques Linard and Louise Moillon, since his work shows affinities with theirs.

According to the early French biographer Florent le Comte he died in misery because of his dissolute life despite his success as an artist.

== Works ==
Van Boucle signed his works with the initials PVB and his works are therefore sometimes confused with those of other artists such as Pieter van den Bos and Peeter van den Bemden.

Van Boucle mainly painted still lifes and paintings of animals. He is considered one of the best Flemish animal painters, together with Pieter Boel and Nicasius Bernaerts. Van Boucle often animated his still life compositions with cats and dogs, much like his master Frans Snyders. He worked for several patrons, including nobles and courtiers as well as hop keepers alike. His works are now mostly in private collections.

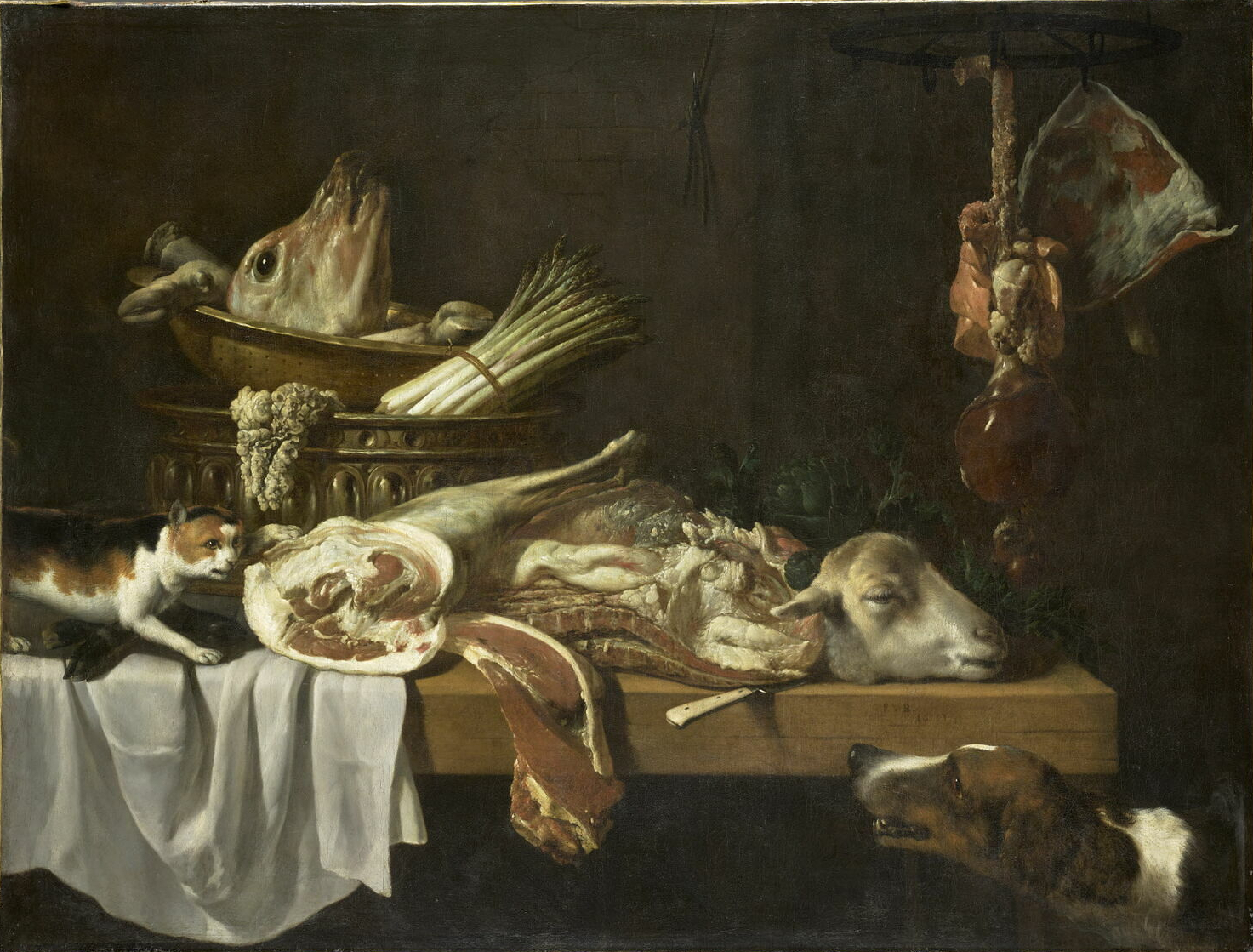
Butcher's meat with dog and cat

Van Boucle painted many works that allude to wealth and luxury. These elements are visible in his still lifes, which show the luster of fruits and vegetables that contrast with the glow of jewelry, silverware and other objects. He was very adept at representing the smoothness of Chinese porcelain that is often present in his paintings.
