= Medusa (Rubens) =

C. 1618 painting by Peter Paul Rubens

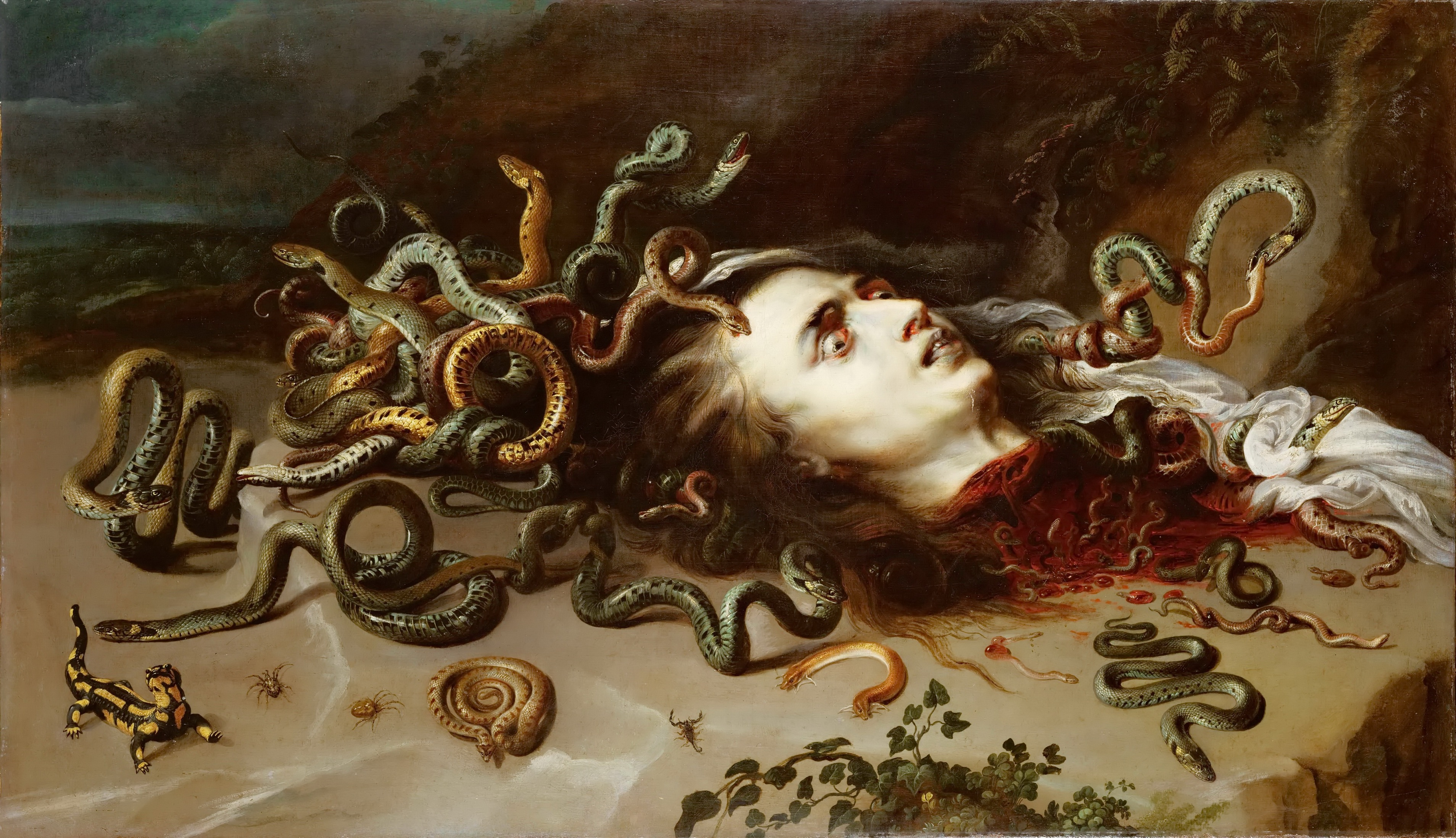
- Artist: Peter Paul Rubens
- Completion date: c. 1618
- Medium: Oil on canvas
- Dimensions: 68.5 cm × 118 cm (27.0 in × 46 in)
- Location: Kunsthistorisches Museum, Vienna

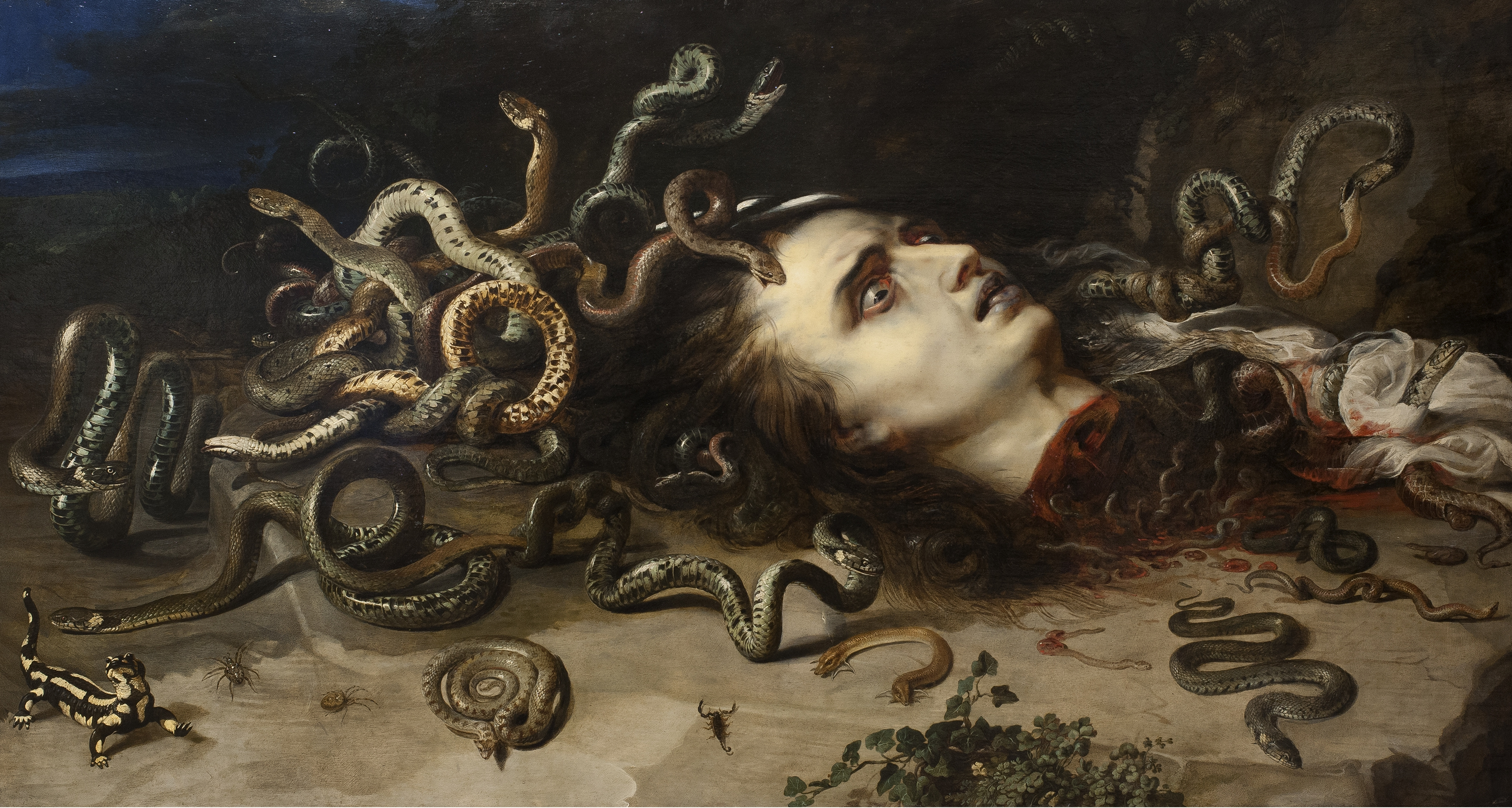
Another version in Brno

Medusa is a c.1618 painting by the Flemish painter Peter Paul Rubens, showing the severed head of Medusa. The snakes in the painting have been attributed to Frans Snyders. Frans Snyders also helped Peter Paul Rubens with his work Prometheus Bound, where he painted the eagle portrayed in it. It is in the collection of the Kunsthistorisches Museum in Vienna. Another version is held in Moravian Gallery in Brno. Rubens was not originally attributed to the painting. Medusa was a popular iconographic symbol at the time due to the interest in Greek mythology by numerous Baroque artists such as Rubens and Caravaggio. The use of Medusa as a symbol has evolved over the course of centuries and has various interpretations of the iconographic meaning, with Rubens' painting based on an interpretation of the Greek mythological story of Medusa.

== History ==
=== Creation ===
Medusa, or sometimes referred to as The Head of Medusa, was created c.1618 using oil on canvas and is 68.5 x 118 cm. Rubens enlisted the help of Frans Snyders who worked with him multiple times. Snyders was a nature artist and worked with Rubens to paint animals in his pieces, such as the snakes in Medusa. The snakes portrayed are nonvenomous European grass snakes, except for the two snakes on the right side of her head which are vipers. Vipers are a medieval symbol of ungratefulness. In Greek mythology, Medusa is portrayed as having venomous snakes for hair. The vipers are shown mating with the female having the male's head in her mouth. Towards the middle of the painting, an amphisbaena is shown. An amphisbaena is a snake-like creature that has two heads, one on each end of its body, and is noted in classical mythology. In Greek mythology, amphisbaenas are made from the blood of Medusa and feed on decaying bodies. Medusa is shown to have just been slain and is laying down in a pool of blood with the snakes and reptiles surrounding her.

=== Attribution ===
Originally, Medusa was put in the Brno museum on December 26, 1818 as Ein Oehlgemälde das Medusenhaupt vorstellend. This roughly translates into "An oil painting depicting the head of Medusa." Rubens was not attributed to this painting during this time as there was no artist attribution when it first entered the museum. Count Joseph von Nimptsch I originally gave the work to the museum and his seal of ownership is on the back of the painting. It is unknown to where he originally obtained the painting from, but it is thought, due to indirect evidence and assumption, that it originally belonged to his second wife. Count Nimptsch donated the artwork a year after his wife died, which has been used as circumstantial evidence that she was the original owner. Brno curator Ernst Rincolini originally attributed this painting to Rubens' student Abraham van Diepenbeeck, with the animals painted by Frans Snyders. Rubens was not mentioned as being the original painter until 1899 and was officially attributed to the painting in the 1940s due to restorative work where it was confirmed that Rubens created Medusa alongside the help of Frans Snyders. The painting that resides in Vienna Kunsthistorisches Museum today is thought to be a later version of the original that is housed in Brno.

=== Reception ===
Medusa evoked strong reactions due to the intense imagery presented. Constantijin Huygens visited merchant Nicolaas Sohier's house in 1619 to view Head of the Medusa and stated in his autobiographical account, "There is the compelling painted head of Medusa, wreathed by snakes that spring from her hair. The countenance of the extremely beautiful woman has its grace still preserved, but at the same time evokes the horrors of the fitting beginning of death and the wreath of hideous snakes. The combination is so shrewdly executed that the spectator would be shocked by the sudden confrontation....but at the same time is moved by the lifelikeness and beauty with which the grim subject is rendered." In private collections, the unveiling of the curtain to reveal the painting behind it is also attributed to the shocking effect it had on viewers.

== Iconography and symbolism ==
The story of Medusa originates from Greek Mythology where Medusa is a Gorgon monster, which is portrayed in Rubens' rendition. Medusa was raped in a sacred shrine dedicated to Minerva by Neptune. Minerva turned Medusa's hair into snakes as revenge for the violation of her shrine, which is portrayed in Rubens' portrayal of her. Medusa was thought to be an apotropaic symbol that would protect from and banish evil. She has been compared to the modern evil eye. Iconographers at the time such as Cesare Ripa and Lodovico Dolce as well as Rubens portrayed her as such. She was thought to be a symbol of evil to ward off evil. Medusa is attributed to both evil and as a symbol of power, as portrayed in Rubens' interpretation.

== Historical context ==
Other famous artists such as Leonardo da Vinci and Caravaggio portrayed Medusa. Unlike Rubens, both da Vinci and Caravaggio painted their portrayals of Medusa on shields or breastplates. Da Vinci's painting of Medusa is lost and did not survive. Cardinal del Monte, who worked closely with the Grand Duke of Tuscany, commissioned Caravaggio to create a painting that symbolized the courageousness of the Grand Duke conquering his opponents. Caravaggio created Head of Medusa, which was the second version that was made. The first version of the painting is in a private collection and the second version is currently in the Uffizi Gallery located in Florence, Italy. Medusa has been portrayed in art for centuries since Ancient Greece, with works being portrayed in various forms such as paintings, sculptures, pottery, and metalwork. Portrayals of Medusa during this time portrayed her with snakes for hair and usually with a gaping mouth and sharp teeth as well as facing the viewer straight on. While the look of Medusa in art has changed over time, her position facing the viewer has stayed consistent.
