= Torture of Prometheus (Salvator Rosa) =

Painting by Salvator Rosa

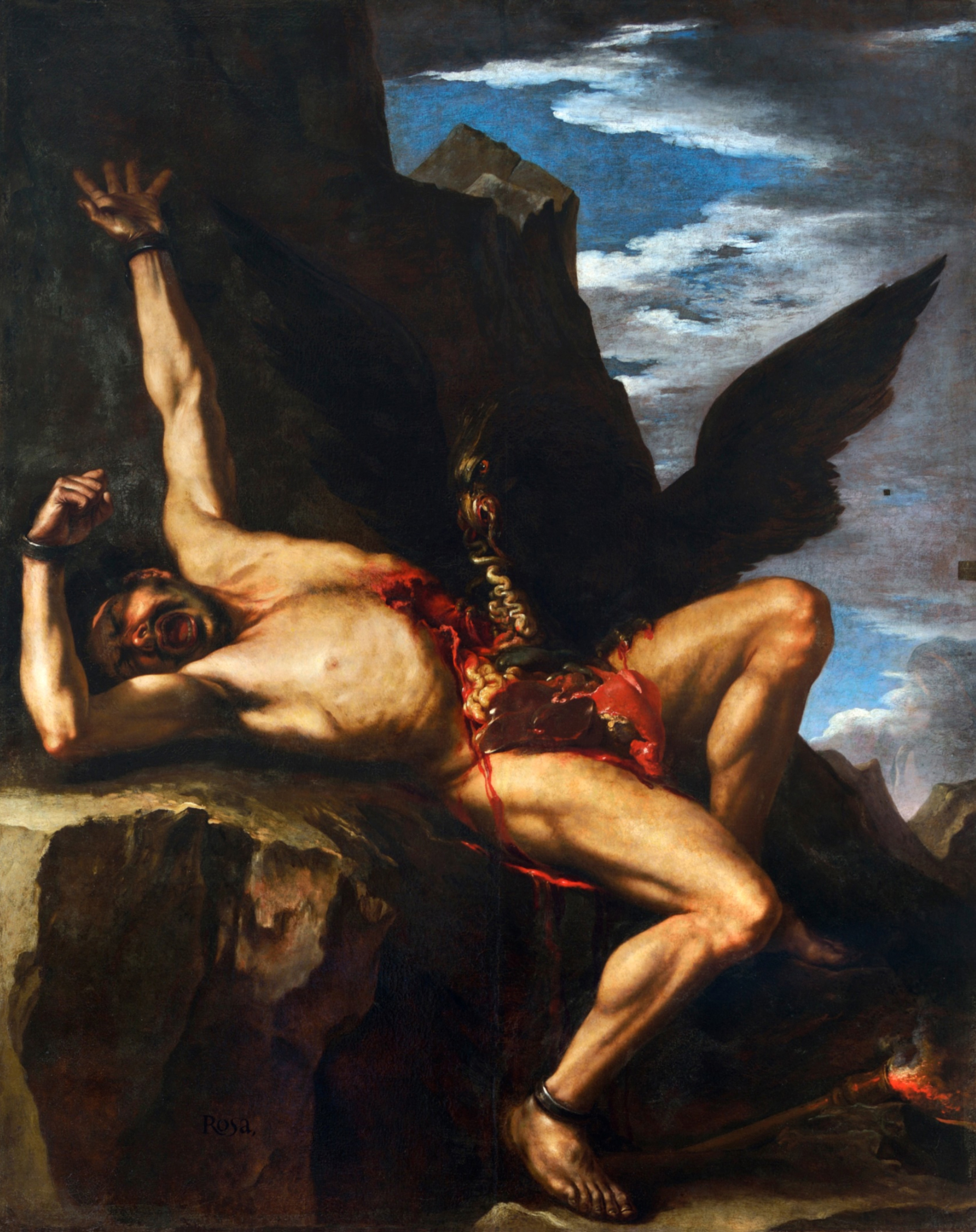
- Artist: Salvator Rosa
- Year: circa 1646 to 1648
- Medium: Oil on canvas
- Dimensions: 224 cm × 179 cm (88 in × 70 in)
- Location: Galleria Nazionale d'Arte Antica, Rome

Torture of Prometheus is an oil painting by Salvator Rosa, an Italian Baroque painter active in Naples and Rome, executed c. 1646-1648. It is held at the Galleria Nazionale d'Arte Antica, in Rome.

== History and description ==
The scene depicts a story from Greek mythology, wherein Prometheus, one of the Titans, is punished by Zeus for having provided humanity with fire. The punishment was to chain Prometheus to a rock in the Caucusus, and that an eagle would arrive and feast on his liver. Daily his wounds would heal, his liver regenerate, and the eagle would return to again torture him. At Prometheus' feet is a torch representative of his sin.

The scene has been represented by other contemporary painters such as Rubens and Jordaens, but they typically show the beginning of the eagle's attack, while Rosa has chosen to depict the event in the midst of a gory disembowelment. Rosa was far more successful in obtaining clients for his landscapes, often depicting storms and wildness. The present scene encapsulates some of the passion which Rosa instilled in his paintings.
