= Peeter van den Bemden =

Flemish still life painter

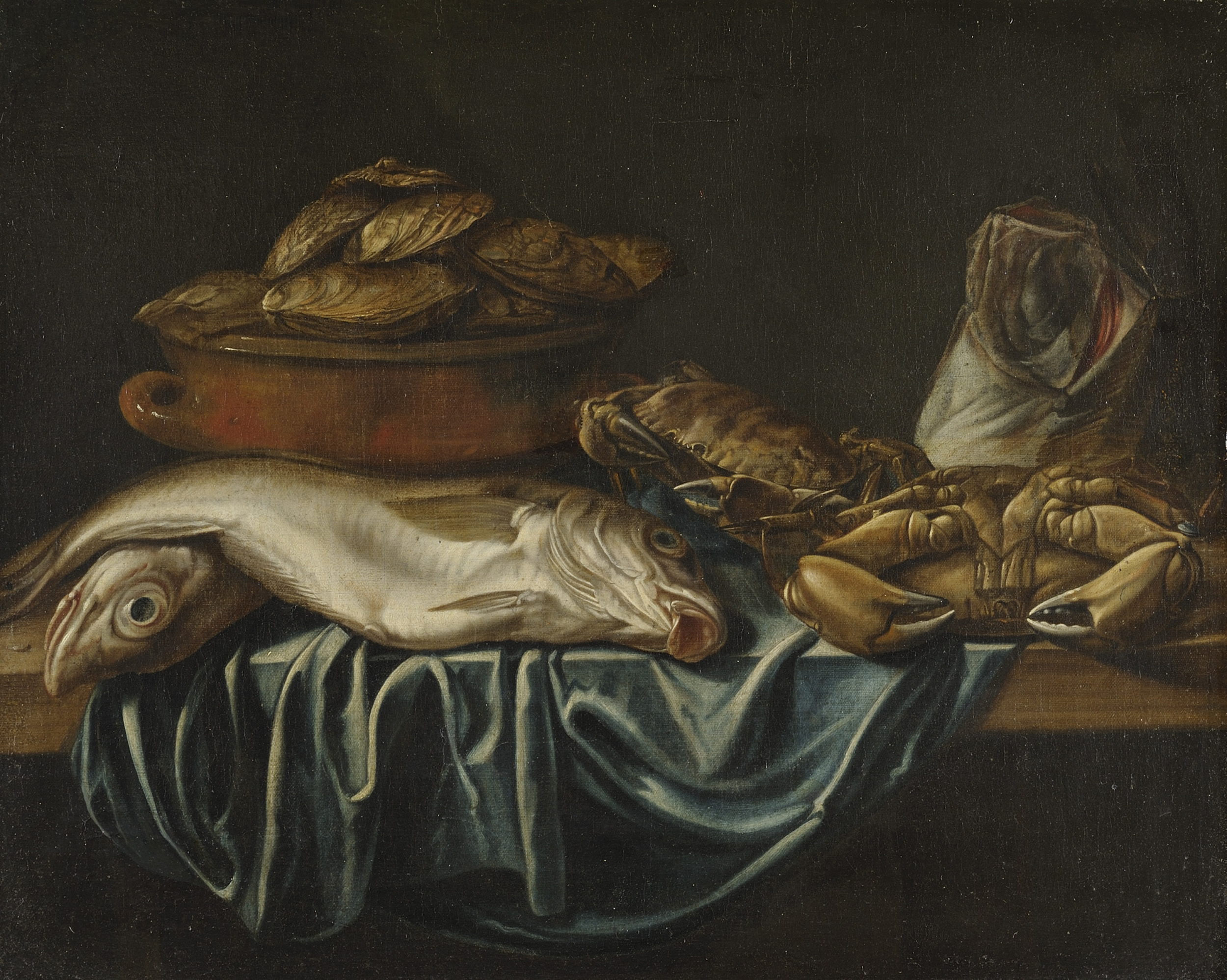
Carp, stockfish, crab on a table and oysters in a crock pot

Peeter van den Bemden, known also as Pieter van den Bemden and Peeter van den Bemde (fl. 1641–1654) was a Flemish still life painter active in Antwerp who is known for his still lifes of dead game, birds and fish and large kitchen still lifes. His work shows a close relationship with works of other Antwerp painters of similar subjects such as Peter van Boucle, a Flemish still life painter who was active in Antwerp from the mid-1630s.

== Life ==
Very little is known with certainty about the life of Van den Bemden. It is speculated that he was likely active in Antwerp between 1641 and 1654.

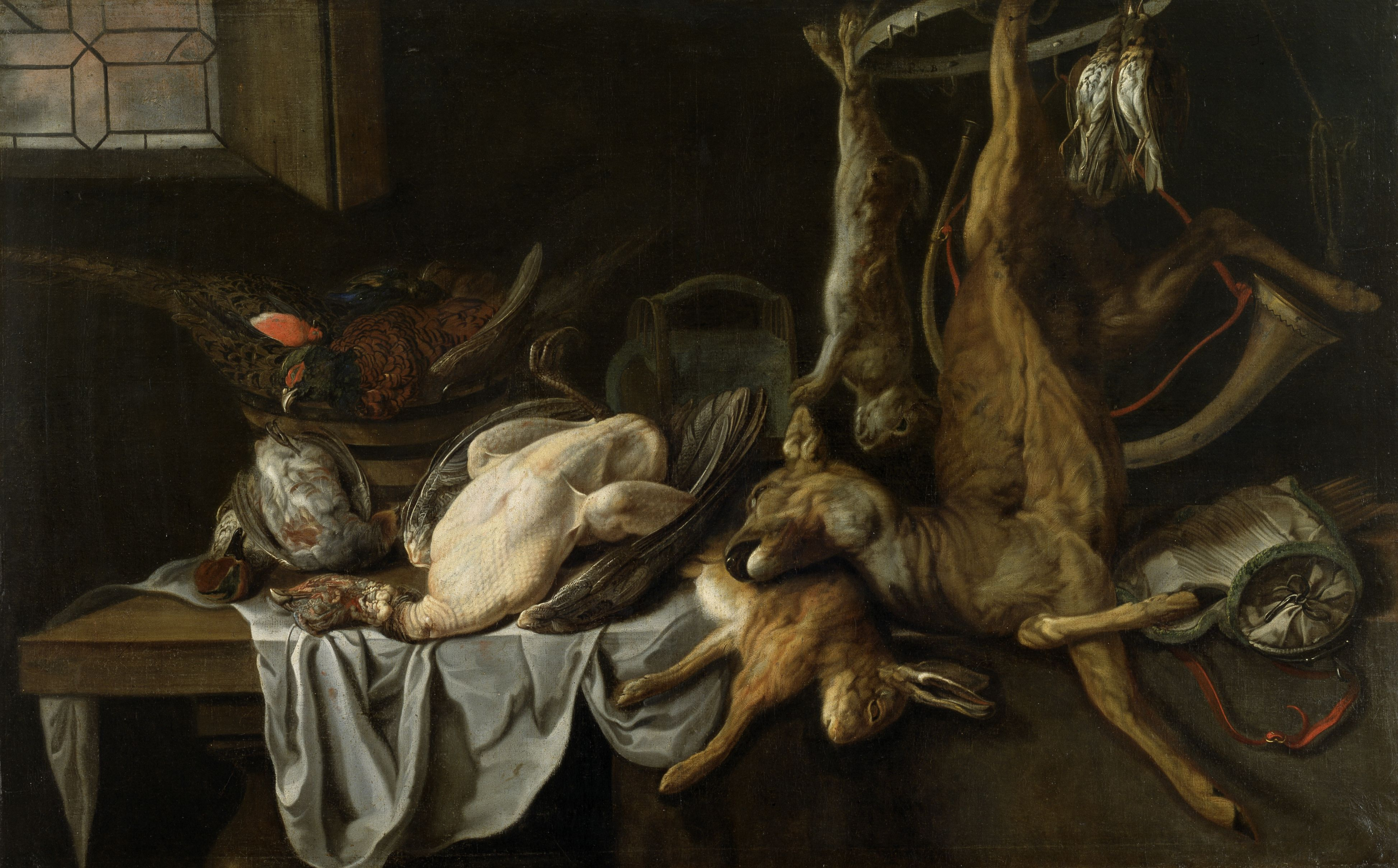
Still Life with Game and Fowl

He was probably a member of the Antwerp van den Bemden (or van den Bemde) family of painters whose members included Hans van den Bemden (fl. 1584–1624), Hendrick van den Bemden (1592-?), Jasper van den Bemden (1592-?), Jacques van den Bemden and Cornelis van den Bemden. He was likely the Peeter van den Bemden who was registered with the Guild of Saint Luke of Antwerp in the guild year 1641–1642 as a 'liefhebber' (amateur), the same year in which the still life painter W. Mertens registered as a master in the Guild. He may have been the vanden Bemden who became a full master in the capacity of a 'wijnmeester' of the Antwerp Guild in the guild year 1648–1649.

He likely died in 1653 or 1654 if he is the vanden Bemden whose death dues were paid to the Guild between 18 September 1653 and 18 September 1654.

== Work ==
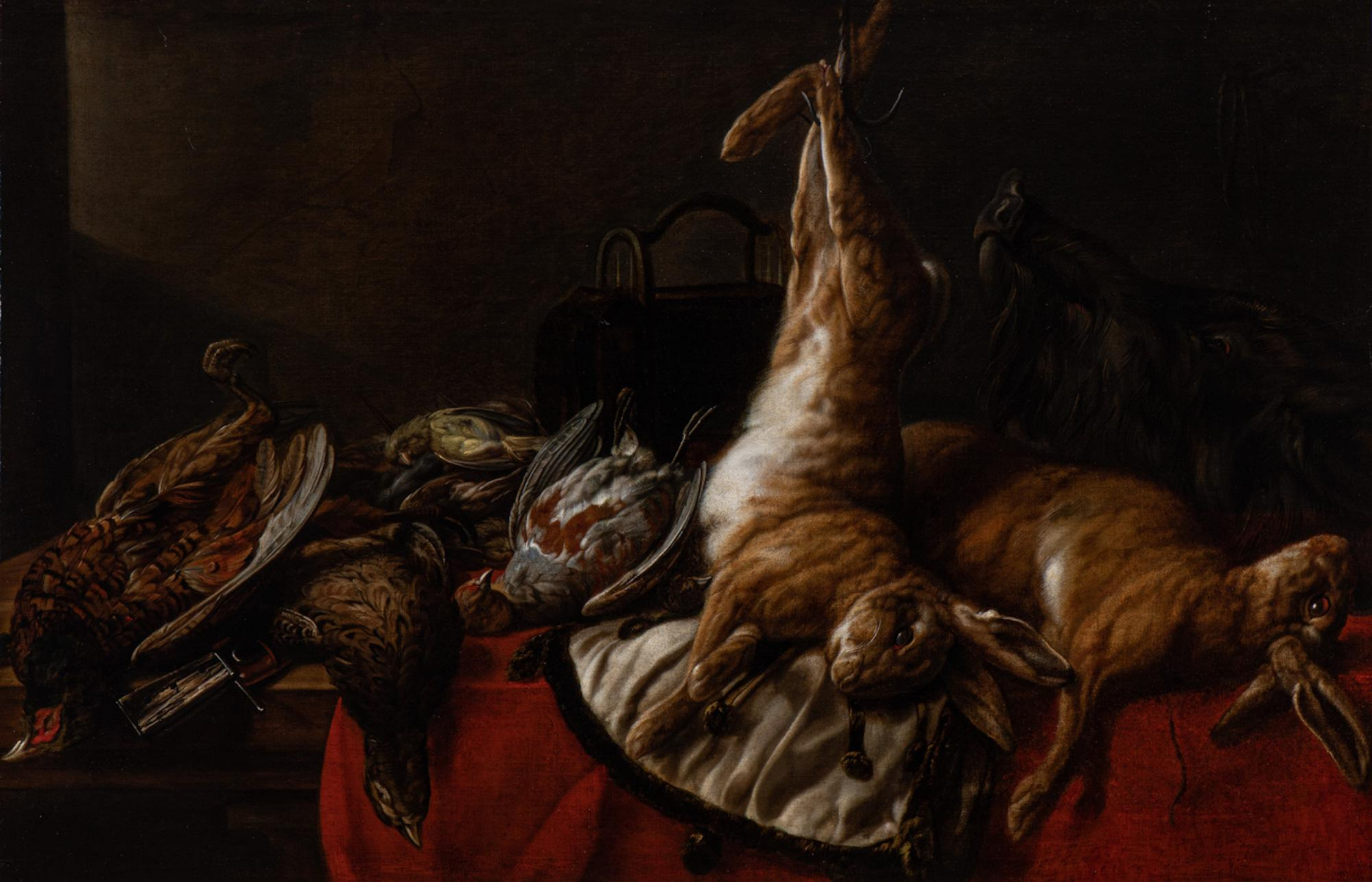
Still life with dead game and birds

Van den Bemden was a specialist still life painter who is known for his still lifes of dead game, birds and fish and large kitchen still lifes with a variety of animals and vegetables. About 20 to 30 works are currently attributed to van den Bemden. Of these, five or six are monogrammed. He mostly signed with a monogram 'PVB' (the B usually connected to the V), but also used 'P.VB'. A still life of dead birds sold at auction at Glerum's in The Hague in 1992 was signed: P. VANDEN/BEMDEN. In the past, his works were often attributed incorrectly to the Flemish still life Peter van Boucle who shared the initials PVB and produced similarly themed works. One of his large kitchen still lifes includes a young moor, who stands next to the table.

The quality of his work is good, but falls generally below the level of better known painters like Adriaen van Utrecht and Abraham van Beijeren, whose works are more complex and better in their execution.
