= Nicasius Bernaerts =

Flemish painter (1620–1678)

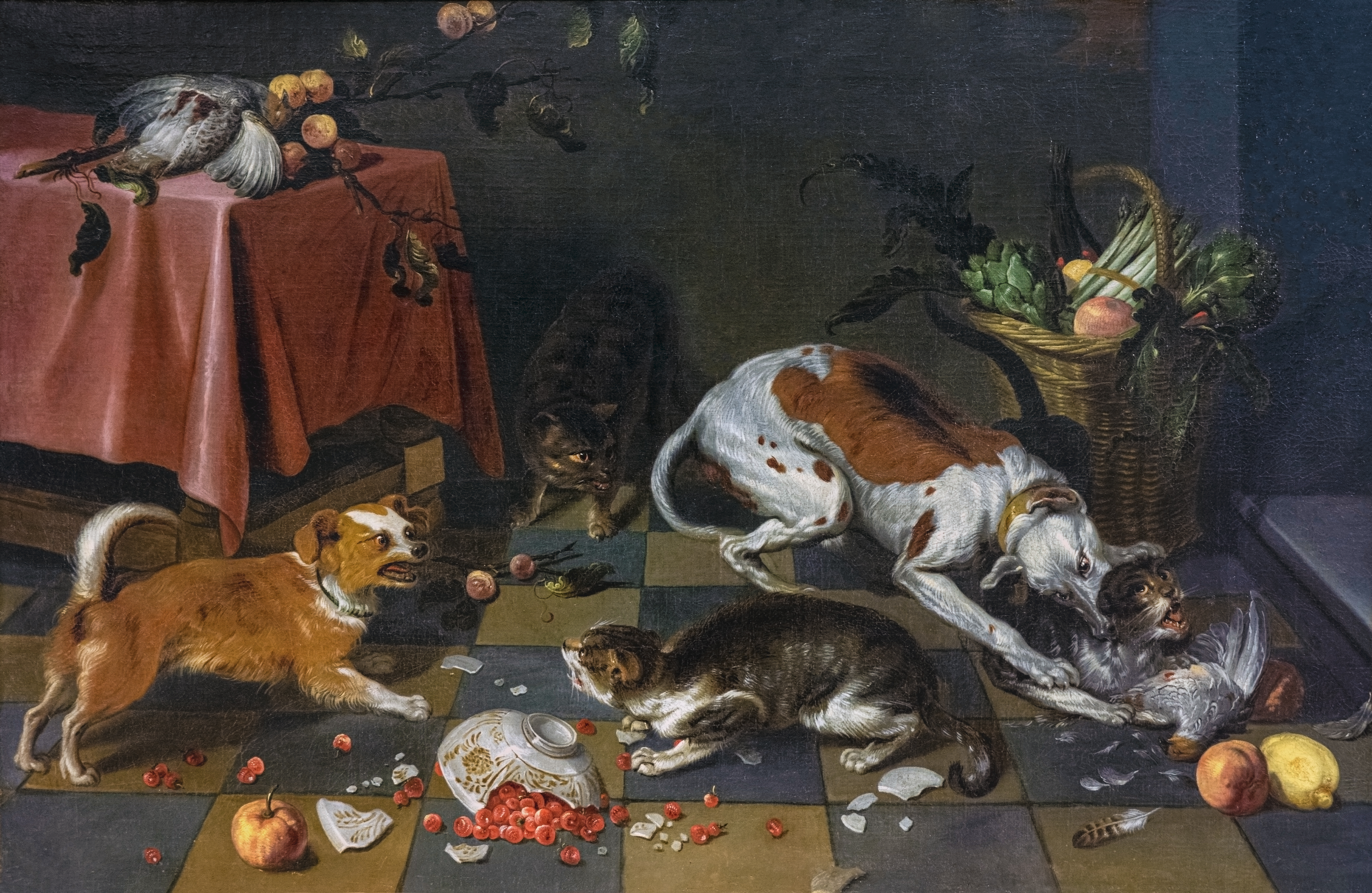
Fight between cats and dogs

Nicasius Bernaerts, Monsù Nicasio or simply Nicasius (15 March 1620, Antwerp – 16 September 1678, Paris) was a Flemish painter of animals, hunting pieces and flowers who had an international career in Italy and Paris. He worked in his native Antwerp, Italy and France. In the final part of his career he worked for the French court and provided tapestry designs to the Gobelins Manufactory in Paris.

== Life ==
Bernaerts was born in Antwerp. He was registered with the Guild of Saint Luke of Antwerp in the guild year 1633–1634 (i.e. between 18 September 1633 and 18 September 1634) as pupil of Frans Snyders. Frans Snyders was at the time the leading animal painter in Antwerp and a close collaborator of Rubens. After completing his training, Bernaerts travelled to Italy. Here he was known as 'Monsù Nicasio'. His work was collected in Italy by Ferdinando II de' Medici, Grand Duke of Tuscany.

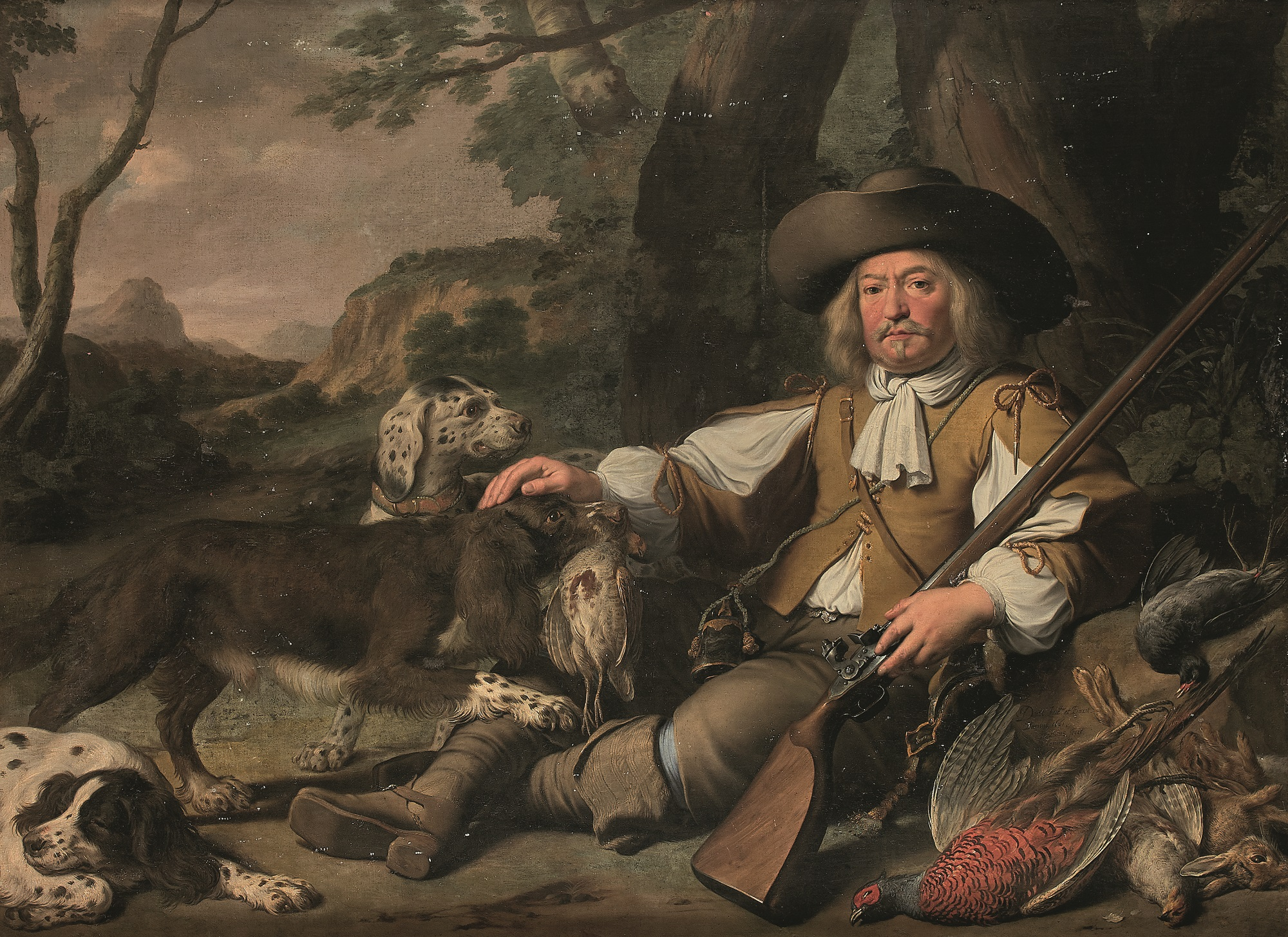
Portrait of a seated hunter with his dogs, collaboration with Jean Daret

Bernaerts subsequently travelled to France where he worked in Paris for a number of years around 1643. He returned to Antwerp where he became a master of the Guild of Saint Luke in 1654.

In 1659 he moved to Paris. He was admitted into the Royal Academy of Painting and Sculpture in Paris in 1663. He was accepted as a member of the Académie on 7 February 1660. However, as he was unwilling to make his master painting that was a condition of full admittance and had lots of disputes with the Académie, he was finally accepted as a master in the Académie on 5 March 1672 after being granted an exemption from the master painting requirement. Some time between 1670 and 1674 he assisted the Flemish landscape painter Abraham Genoels as an animal painter to complete tapestry designs for Juan Domingo de Zuñiga y Fonseca, the governor of the Habsburg Netherlands. He was employed by the French king Louis XIV to make paintings of all the new animals added to his menagerie at the Palace of Versailles. In 1673 Bernaerts provided 46 studies of 52 species of animals. Some of these paintings were subsequently used to decorate the pavilion at the menagerie.

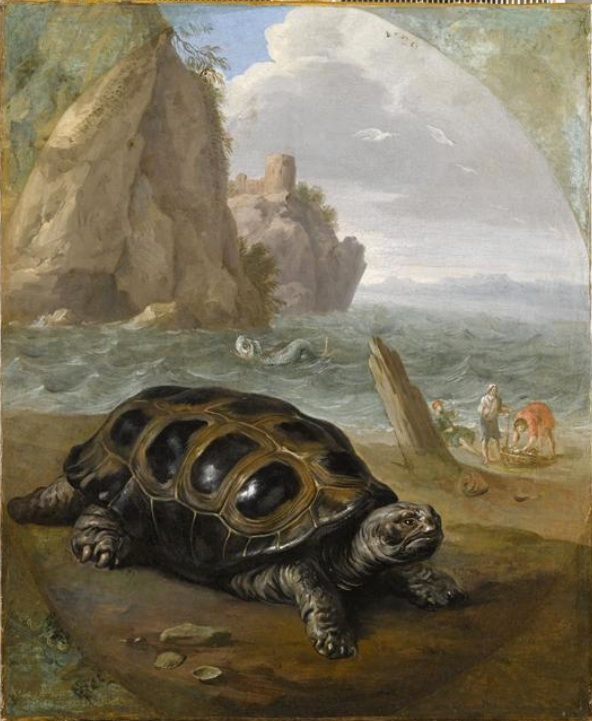
Sea turtle

He provided studies and animal paintings for the needs of the Gobelins Manufactory and royal real estate office (Garde-Meuble de la Couronne). The French animal painter Alexandre-François Desportes was his pupil from 1676 until Bernaerts death.

Bernaerts was later in life reduced to poverty as a result of alcoholism. In 1678 he was living in the rue Saint Martin in Paris. He died in Paris in 1678.

== Work ==
Nicasius Bernaerts painted animals, hunting pieces, including game pieces, and still lifes. Bernaerts is known for his extensive and violent depictions of animals in combat, in particular of predatory birds. These were directly inspired by similar works by his master Frans Snyders who pioneered this genre in Flanders. Bernaerts worked on such scenes before and possibly during the period he was employed at the Gobelins tapestry manufactory.

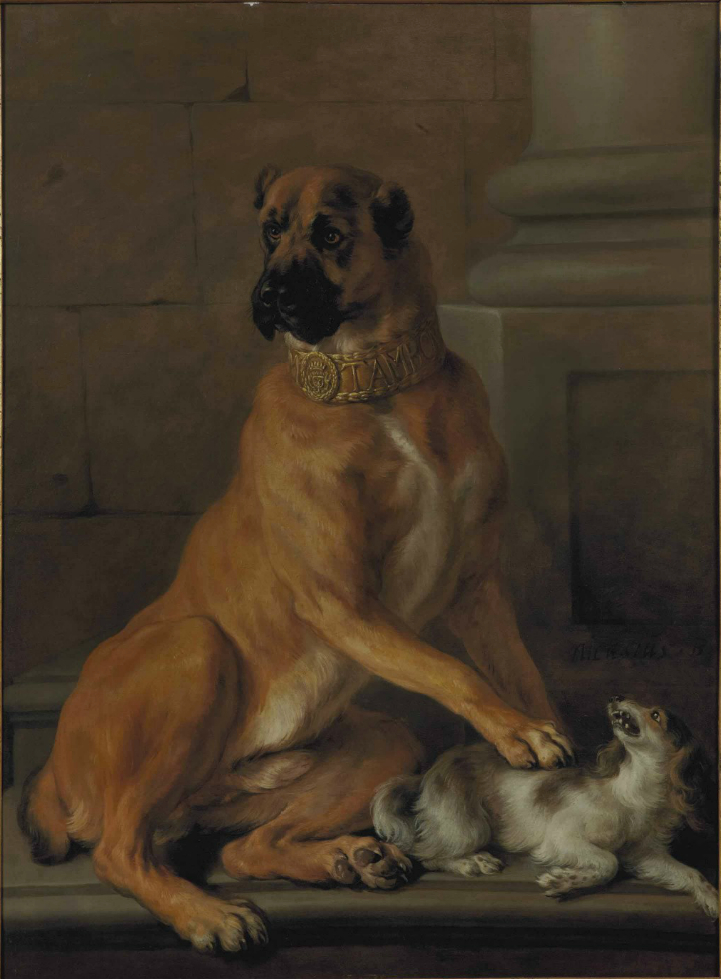
Portrait of Tambon, dog of the Duke of Vendôme

In his paintings of the animals from the menagerie at Versailles, Bernaerts presented his subjects with a pedagogic objective. The animals are depicted in quiet poses, their bodies almost always in profile, their eyes often turned to the viewer, as in portraits of humans. This posing of the animal allows the viewer to better observe the anatomy of each animal. Each creature is set against a classicizing landscape background. Bernaerts' paintings are now the best sources for identifying the original animal population of the Versailles menagerie as they were inventoried by Nicolas Bailly in his Inventaire des tableaux du roy rédigé entre 1709 et 1710 (first published by Fernand Engerand, Paris, 1899).

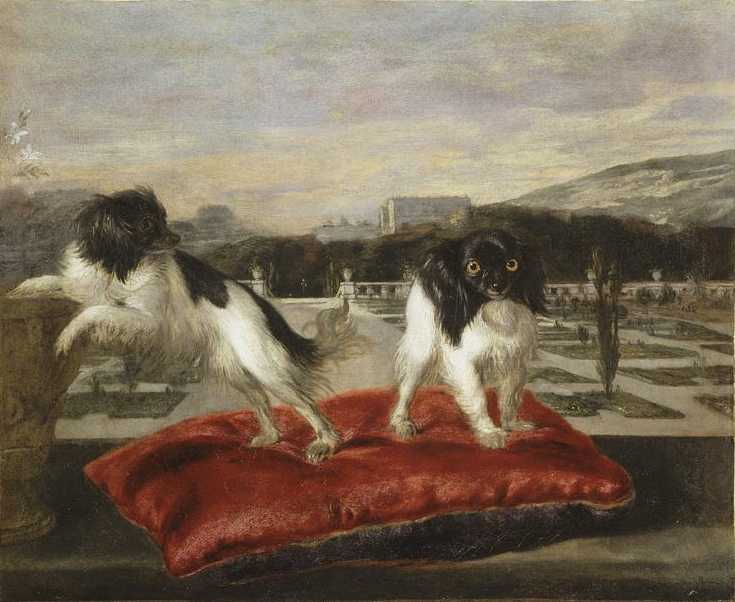
Two spaniel dogs on the terrace of an Italianate garden

There is uncertainty regarding the authorship of the numerous unsigned oil-sketches that came to the Louvre during the French Revolution and were listed as 'A.F. Desportes' originally and then distributed as such about a century ago to French provincial museums. An old Gobelins inventory, which was rediscovered in 1967, shows that a number of these works were produced by the generation of artist preceding Desportes such as Nicasius Bernaerts. It is assumed that among the works now attributed to Bernaerts at the Louvre a number must be authentic, most probably the nicely done, rather antiquated portraits of different poultry races.

Bernaerts also painted portraits of pets as shown in the Portrait of Tambon, dog of the Duke of Vendôme (1865, Auctioned at Christie's on 28–29 September 2015 in Paris, lot 386).
