= Prometheus Bound (Rubens) =

Painting by Peter Paul Rubens

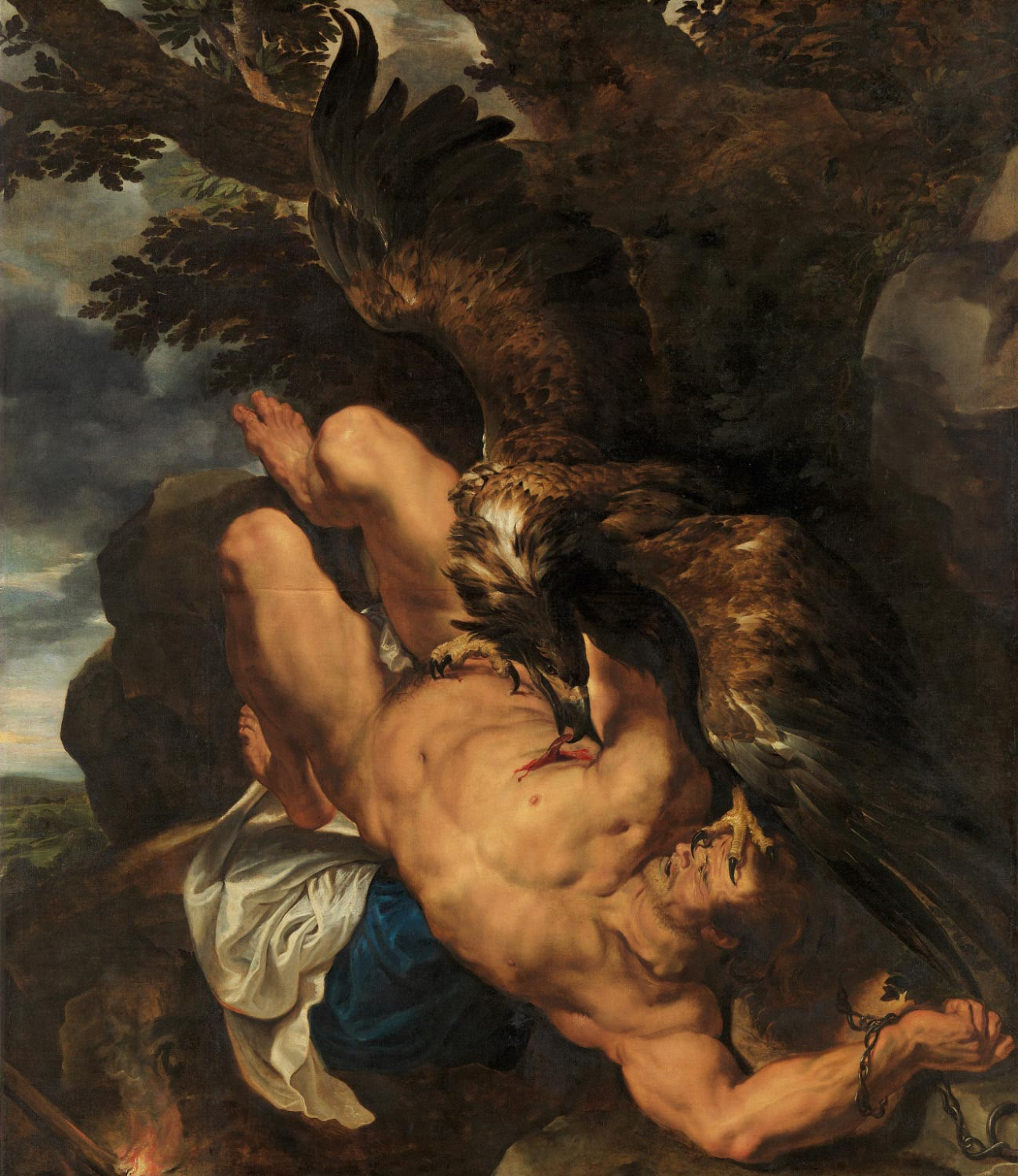
- Artist: Peter Paul Rubens
- Year: circa 1611 to 1612
- Medium: oil on canvas
- Dimensions: 243.5 cm × 209.5 cm (95.9 in × 82.5 in)
- Location: Philadelphia Museum of Art

Prometheus Bound is an oil painting by Peter Paul Rubens, a Flemish Baroque artist from Antwerp. Influenced by the Greek play, Prometheus: The Friend of Man, Peter Paul Rubens completed this painting in his studio with collaboration from Frans Snyders, who rendered the eagle. It remained in his possession from 1612 to 1618, when it was traded in a group of paintings completed by Rubens, to Englishman Sir Dudley Carleton in exchange for his collection of classical statues. This work is currently in the collection of the Palais des Beaux-Arts de Lille.

== History ==
In 1582, Peter Paul Rubens first apprenticed with a distant relative, Tobias Verhaecht, a landscape painter. Rubens spent a short time in his studio, learning the basics of composing a landscape. These lessons would influence his work, including Prometheus Bound, as the backgrounds of many of his paintings play an important role in the composition. Rubens then apprenticed for four years with Adam van Noort, a portrait painter, known for painting mythological scenes with plentiful nudes and unrestrained images of Flemish life. Before starting his own studio, Rubens worked with Otto van Veen, from 1594 to 1598. Here, Rubens learned composition and the iconography of history painting, demonstrated in Prometheus Bound with the foreshortened figure positioned close to the viewer and the use of iconography derived from an ancient Greek play.

In 1610, Rubens opened a studio of his own in Antwerp, while also serving as court painter to the Archduke and Archduchess in Brussels. In the same period as Prometheus Bound, Rubens was also painting The Descent from the Cross, a commissioned altarpiece.

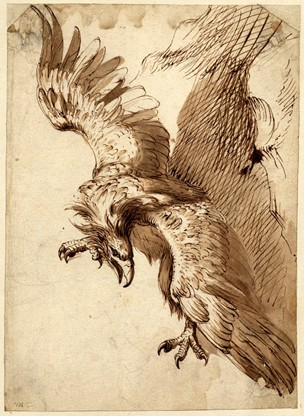
Drawing by Frans Snyders in the collection of The British Museum

=== Collaboration with Frans Snyders ===
After setting up his own studio, Peter Paul Rubens had many important commissions. He collaborated with artists that were regarded as masters in their field of study. For Prometheus Bound, Rubens collaborated with Frans Snyders, a master of animal and hunting scenes, for the eagle.

== Source Material ==
Prometheus Bound, a Greek play attributed to Aeschylus, but thought to have been completed by another after Aeschylus' death in 456 B.C. It is possible that Prometheus Bound is the second play written by Aeschylus in a connected trilogy, followed by Prometheus lyomenos (Prometheus Unbound), of which only a few fragments have survived.

In the play, the Titan Prometheus, had assisted Zeus, the King of Olympians, in establishing rule over Cronus and the other Titans, but infuriated Zeus by becoming the champion of mortals and giving them fire and the arts. In the opening of the play, as punishment for stealing fire from Mount Olympus to give to humanity. Zeus orders Hephaestus, Kratos (Power) and Bia (Force) to chain Prometheus to a high rock in the mountains of Scythia. There he will suffer torment as long as Zeus wishes, by having an eagle devour his perpetually regenerating liver every day.

Peter Paul Rubens would have used these Greek influences to carry out his own interpretation of the story. When he painted a classic or mythological subject, he was glorifying human creation, expressing his own joy at the beauty of the world. In Prometheus Bound, he depicts a suffering victim, Prometheus, but also the beauty of the Eagle causing the torment.

== Interpretation ==
In Rubens's interpretation, the enormous eagle's beak rips open Prometheus's torso, exposing bloody entrails. The eagle's talons gouge into Prometheus's right eye, while his left eye is focused on the predator, indicating that he is aware of his torture. Agony is conveyed in his clenched fists, writhing legs, and tousled hair. The liver was chosen as the source for torture, as Greeks regarded the liver as intelligence, soul, and the seat of life.

The art of Rubens is related to the attitudes expressed by his brother Philip and his teacher Justus Lipsius regarding the Counter Reformation. They studied Greek and Roman writing and ideas, but saw pagan mythology as an indirect tribute to the power of the Christians' one God.

A poem written by Dominicus Baudius, a professor at the University of Leiden and friend of Rubens' brother Phillip, describes the intended response of the viewer in his Poematum:

Here, with hooked beak, a monstrous vulture digs about in the liver of Prometheus, who is given no peace from his torments as ever and again the savage bird draws near his self-renewing breast and attacks it punishingly. He is not content with his inhuman sacrificial feast, but with his claws lacerates, here the agonized face, there the man's thigh. He would fly murderously on the spectators, did not his chained prey detain him. He can do no more that terrify the frightened onlookers by turning his flaming eyes from one to the other. Blood flows from the chest and every part where his claws leave their mark, and his piercing eyes dart savage flames. You might think that he moves, that his feathers tremble. Horror grips the onlookers.

== Rubens's Influences ==
=== Rome ===
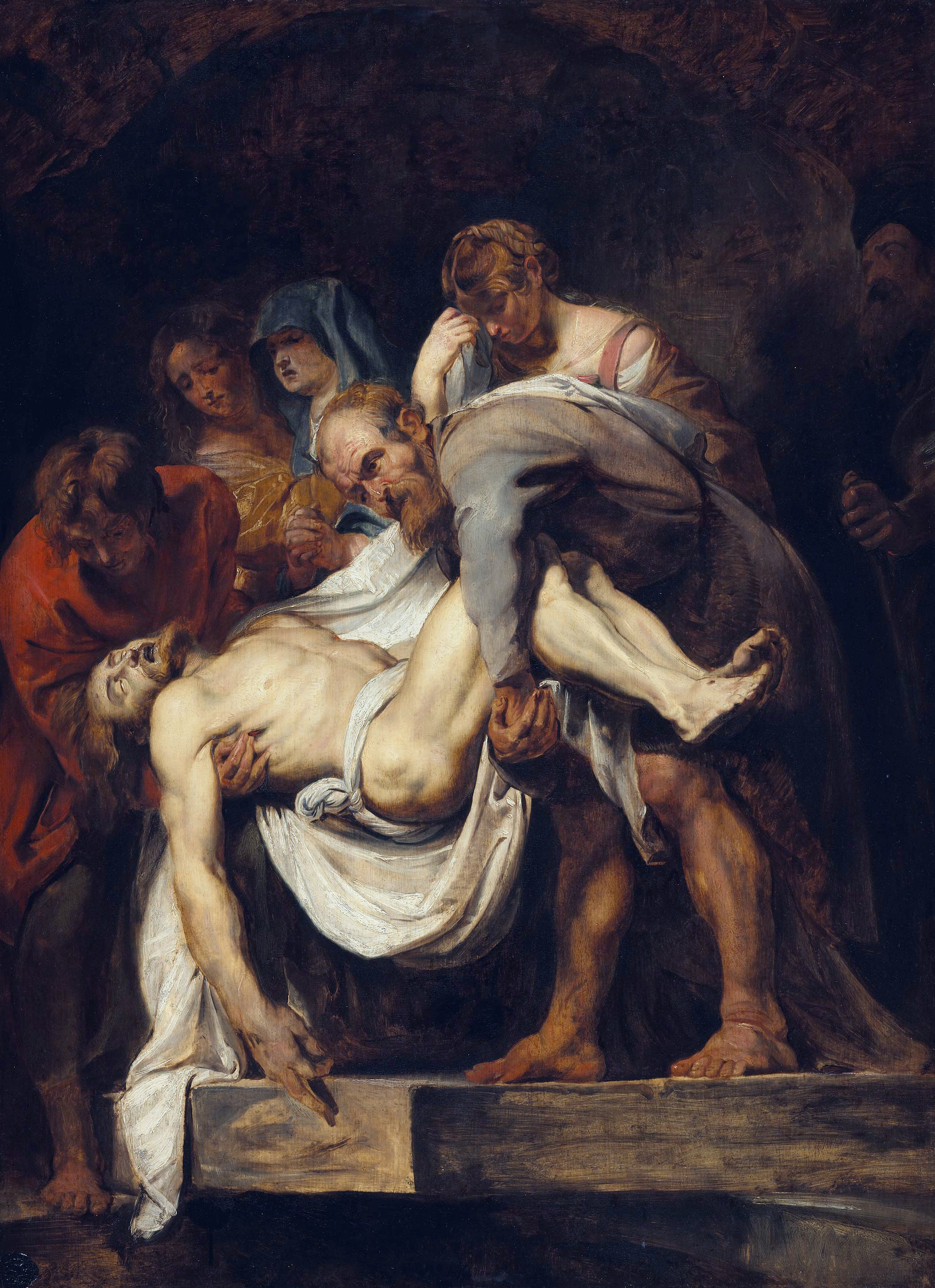
Peter Paul Rubens - The Entombment (after Caravaggio)

Rome was in the height of the Catholic Revival, as Rubens spent countless hours making studies from figures painted by Michelangelo, in the Sistine Chapel. Rubens's Prometheus Bound was influenced by the dense musculature and broad frame by Michelangelo. Also in Rome at this time was Caravaggio, at the height of his career. Although, it was unlikely that the two painters never met, Rubens was impressed by his paintings, even copying some of them. Even though he had a turbulent life, Caravaggio mastered the used of tenebrism, the dramatic balance of light and dark, often used to highlight the figures.

=== Venice ===
When he arrived in Venice in June 1600, the city's art scene was flourishing. Titian, regarded as one of the greatest painters, had died in 1576, one year before Rubens was born. Titian's popularity survived in Venice and Rubens studied his mastery of form, intense coloring, strong and fluid lines, and his power of imagination. Rubens also visited the Doges' Palace in Venice, which contained ceilings and walls change by paintings of Christian visions and pagan allegories.

=== Florence ===
Rubens was given the opportunity to travel to Florence in October 1600 for the wedding of Marie de' Medici, bride to the Henry IV of France. During this time, Rubens visited sites containing important Renaissance works, including the Church of San Lorenzo, which held the Medici tombs by Michelangelo. He also studied the work of Ludovico Cigoli, a painter who digressed from the contorted affectation of Mannerist art.

== Provenance ==
Known for its strong emotional response, Prometheus Bound stayed in Rubens's possession from its completion in 1612. The first recorded sale of Prometheus Bound was to the English collector Sir Dudley Carleton, in 1618. Carleton offered to trade Rubens his collection of classical statues, for a large group of paintings from Rubens's workshop, which had been overseen, or at least, finished by Rubens himself. To prove he worked on Prometheus Bound by his own hand, Rubens wrote in a letter to Carleton:

A Prometheus bound on Mount Caucasus, with an eagle which packs his liver. Original by my own hand, and the eagle done by Snyders. 500 florins.
