= Louise Moillon =

French artist (1610–1696)

- Born: Louise Moillon c. 1610; Paris, France
- Died: 1696; Paris, France
- Known for: Painting
- Movement: Baroque
- Spouse: Etienne Girardot

Louise Moillon (c. 1610–1696) was a French still life painter in the Baroque era. It is recorded that she became known as one of the best still life painters of her time, as her work was purchased by King Charles I of England, as well as French nobility. Moillon's works show the influence of Flemish painting in their trompe l'oeil effects but are characteristically French in their elegance. Moillon created about 40 paintings during her lifetime which are held in museums and private collections.

== Life ==
Moillon was born into a strict Calvinist family in Paris in 1610. She grew up in St–Germain-des-Prés district of Paris, a district known as a safe haven for religiously persecuted Protestant refugees primarily from the southern Netherlands. This district was also known for its collection of traditional Netherlandish painters who could have attributed to the development of Moillon's painting style. During the Baroque era, still-life painting was beginning to grow and thrive, particularly in the art market in Holland, but was less popular in France where Moillon resided.

Moillon had six siblings, one of whom was also a painter named Isaac Moillon, who obtained his education from the French Royal Academy of Painting and Sculpture. Her father, Nicolas Moillon, was a landscape and portrait painter, art dealer, and member of the Académie de Saint-Luc. Moillon's mother, Marie Gilbert, was a daughter of a goldsmith. Moillon learned the basics of painting from her father, however he died when she was young. The following year, Moillon's mother remarried another painter and art dealer, Francois Garnier. Garnier continued to give Moillon lessons and expanded her art education although it is thought other people were instrumental in Moillon's art education.

Louise Moillon married a timber merchant, Etienne Girardot, in the 1640s and did not paint as frequently after her marriage. She had at least three children of her own. The Revocation Edict of Nantes in 1685 discriminated on any religion other than Catholicism, forcing citizens of France to convert to Catholicism and Louise's family was greatly affected. It is thought Moillon's husband was sent to prison after he refused to convert to Catholicism. After the revocation, no records of Moillon producing work have been found. Louise died in France in 1696 and was given a Catholic burial.

== Painting style ==
Moillon specialized in still-life painting, commonly using oil paint on canvas or wood panel. She also made works primarily containing fruits that were usually arranged on tables. Her work is characterized by stillness and acute detail, such as the texture of exotic fruit glowingly displayed against a dark background. She used Trompe l’oeil elements to give viewers an illusion and make her paintings realistic. Louise Moillon used Trompe l'oeil to give her still-lifes a lot of texture which further contribute to the realistic aspects and make her paintings relatable to pictures. Moillon additionally created ledges in her pieces that spread to the end of the picture frame to enhance the illusion.

Although Moillon painted still-lifes, human figures sometimes appeared in the background of her pieces. Moillon was one of the first French still-life artists to combine figures and still-life before 1650 along with another painter named Jacques Linard. Moillon's style used elements from Flemish painting through use of trompe l'oeil elements and the contrast of cool and warm toned colors along with aspects of French genre painting as shown through the compositional style of her paintings. Some of Louise Moillon's painting compositions have been described to have a primitive quality due to the way she arranges the fruit.

The notion that Louise Moillon was highly regarded by her contemporaries is demonstrated by the writing of Georges de Scudéry (1646) who placed her name alongside the still-life painters Jacques Linard and Peter van Boucle (Pieter van Boeckel), comparing all three to Michelangelo, Raphael, and Titian. She had many notable patrons including Louis XIII's minister of finance. In 1641, she collaborated with Boucle and Linard on a large composition of fruit and flowers. The majority of Moillon's paintings were executed in the 1630s, before her marriage in 1640 to Etienne Girardot de Chancourt. Her last dated work is from 1674.

== Gallery of works ==
Painting Name and Location	Image
Basket of Apricots, 1634 Held by the Louvre Museum	Basket of Apricots, 1634
Basket with Peaches and Grapes, 1631 Held by the Staatliche Kunsthalle Karlsruhe Museum	Basket with Peaches and Grapes, 1631
The Fruit and Vegetable Seller (also known as At the Greengrocer), 1631 Held by the Louvre Museum	The Fruit and Vegetable Seller, 1631
Bowl of Lemons and Oranges in a Box of Wood Shavings and Pomegranates, 1630 Held by the National Museum of Women in the Arts; Can be seen on National Museum of Women in the Arts website.	
Still Life with Bowl of Curacao Oranges, 1634 Held by the Norton Simon Museum; Can be seen on the Norton Simon Museum website	
Still Life with Fruit, 1637 Held by the Thyssen-Bornemisza Museum; Can be seen on the Thyssen-Bornemisza Museum website	
Still Life with Cherries, Strawberries and Gooseberries, 1630 Held by the Norton Simon Museum	Still Life with Cherries, Strawberries and Gooseberries, 1630
Basket of Fruit with a Bunch of Asparagus, 1630 Held by the Art Institute of Chicago	Basket of Fruit with a Bunch of Asparagus, 1630
At the Market Stall Private Collection	At the Market Stall
Still Life with Blackberries Held by the Musée des Augustins	
Basket of Peaches Held by Los Angeles County Museum of Art	Basket of Peaches
Still Life with a Basket of Fruit, 1630 National Museum of Women in the Arts	Still Life with a Basket of Fruit, 1630
Plum Basket with Basket of Strawberries, 1632 Held by the Musée des Augustins	Plum Basket with Basket of Strawberries, 1632
Cup of Cherries and Melon, 1633 Held by the Louvre Museum	Cup of Cherries and Melon, 1633
Still Life with Peaches on a Ledge Private Collection	Still Life with Peaches on a Ledge
Market Scene with a Pick-Pocket Private Collection	Market Scene with a Pick-Pocket
Still Life with Peaches and Plums Held by the Louvre Museum	Still Life with Peaches and Plums
Still Life with Peaches and Grapes in a China Bowl Private Collection	Still Life with Peaches and Grapes in a China Bowl
Still Life with Basket of Plums, 1629 Private Collection	Still Life with Basket of Plums, 1629
