= Frans Snyders =

Flemish painter (1579–1657)

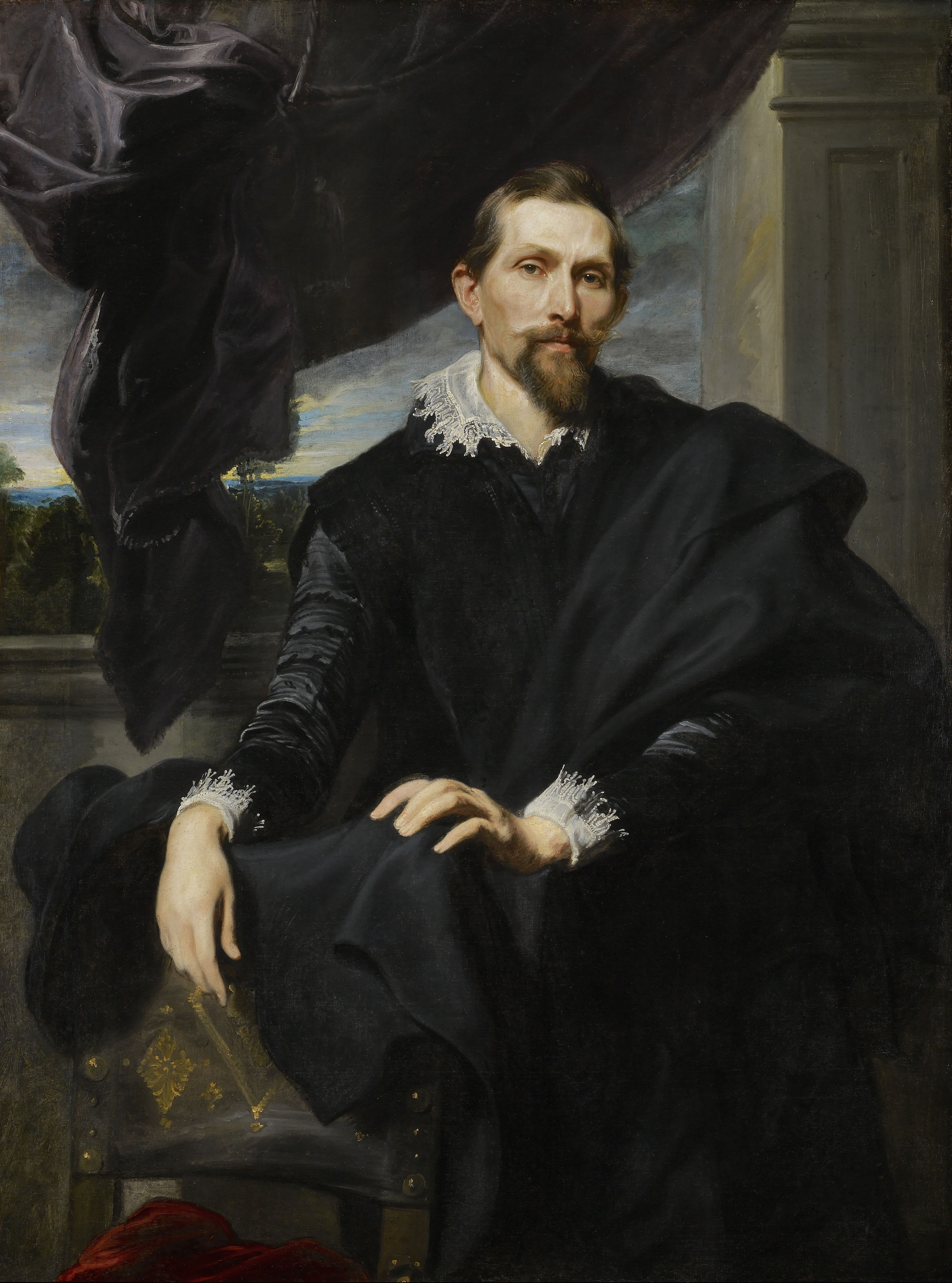
Frans Snyders, by Anthony van Dyck

Frans Snyders or Frans Snijders (11 November 1579 – 19 August 1657) was a Flemish painter of animals, hunting scenes, market scenes, and still lifes. A versatile artist, his works depict all sorts of foods, utensils, and tableware and wide assortment of animals. He was one of the earliest specialist animaliers and he is credited with initiating a wide variety of new still-life and animal subjects in Antwerp. His hunting scenes and still lifes engage the viewer with their dramatic and dynamic effects. He was a regular collaborator with leading Antwerp painters such as Peter Paul Rubens, Anthony van Dyck, Jacob Jordaens, and Abraham Janssens.

== Life ==
Snyders was born in Antwerp as the son of Jan Snijders, the keeper of a wine inn frequented by artists. According to legend the famous 16th-century painter Frans Floris squandered his fortune in the inn of his father. Snyders' mother was Maria Gijsbrechts. Snyders had five siblings. His brother Michiel also became a painter but no works of him are known.

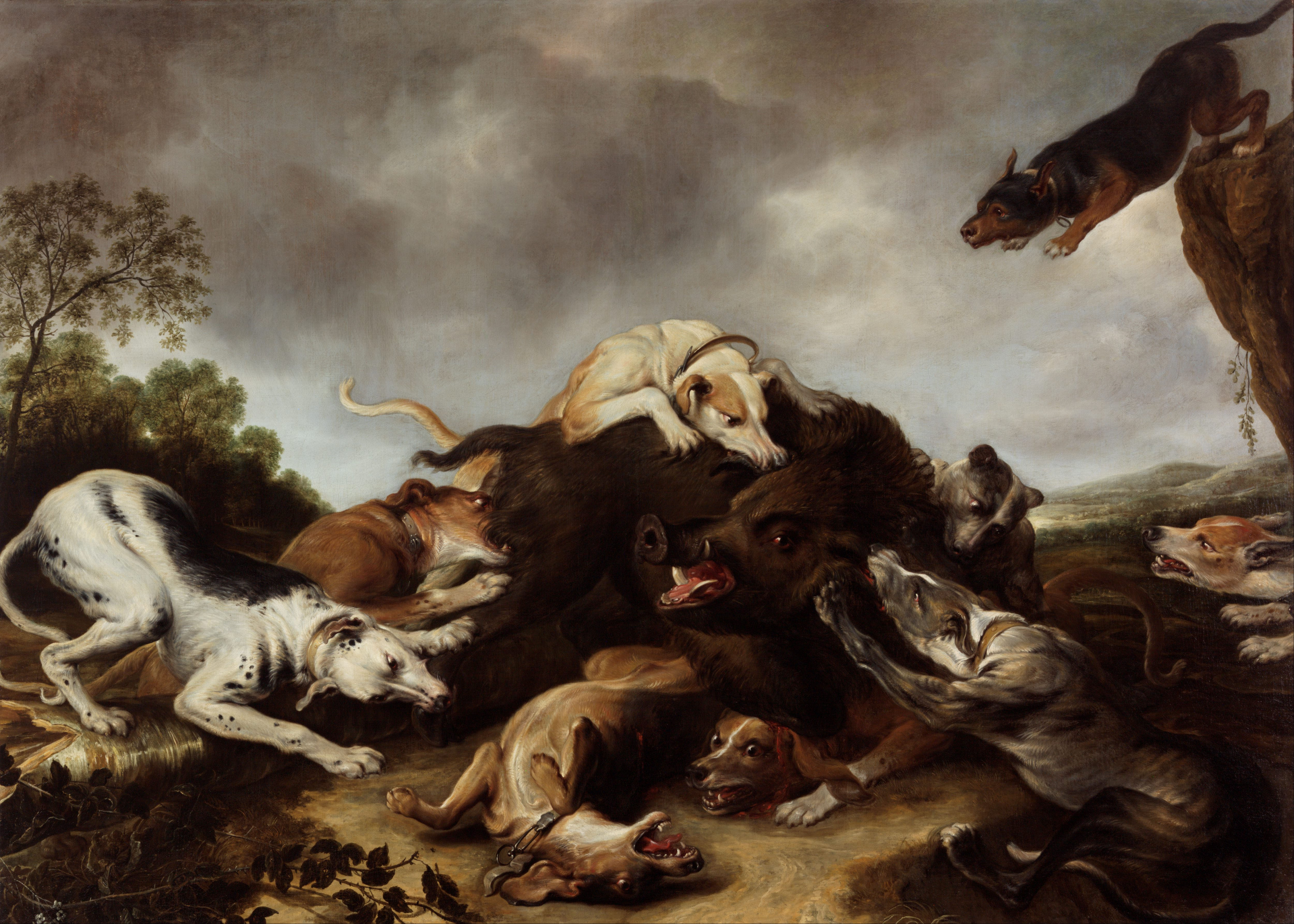
Wild boar hunt

Snyders was recorded as a student of Pieter Brueghel the Younger in 1593, and subsequently trained with Hendrick van Balen, who was the first master of Anthony van Dyck. Snyders became a master of the Antwerp Guild of Saint Luke in 1602. He travelled to Italy in 1608-9 where he first resided in Rome. The artist subsequently traveled from Rome to Milan. Jan Brueghel the Elder had introduced him there by letter to the famous art collector Cardinal Borromeo. Brueghel asked Snyders to paint a copy after a portrait by Titian in the Borromeo collection. This is regarded as evidence that Snyders was a skilled figure painter before he turned his attention to still life painting.

Snyders had returned to Antwerp in the spring of 1609. In 1611 he married Margaretha, the sister of Cornelis de Vos and Paul de Vos, two leading painters in Antwerp. His collaboration with Rubens started in the 1610s.

Snyders had many patrons including the Ghent Bishop Antonius Triest who commissioned four paintings of market scenes around 1615 (Hermitage Museum, Saint Petersburg). He was a friend of van Dyck who painted Snyders and his wife more than once (Frick Collection, Kassel etc.). Snyders was commercially successful and was able to purchase a house on the high-end Keizerstraat in Antwerp. In 1628 he became the dean of the Guild of Saint Luke.

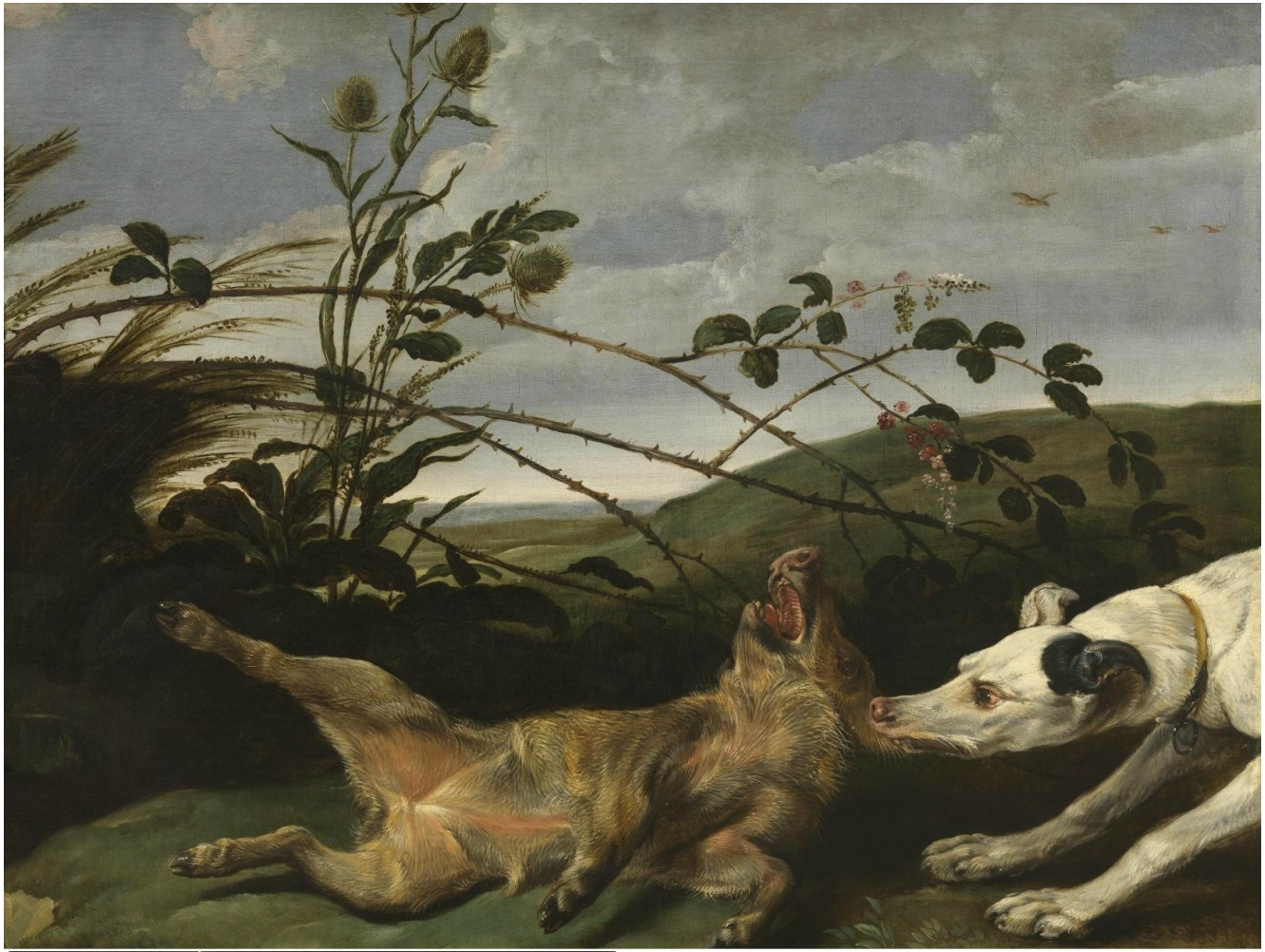
A greyhound catching a young wild boar

In the period 1636–1638, he was one of the Antwerp artists who assisted Rubens in a large commission for decorations for the hunting pavilion Torre de la Parada of Philip IV of Spain. The two artists also worked together on decorations for the Royal Alcazar of Madrid and the royal Buen Retiro Palace in Madrid. Snyders painted about 60 hunting paintings and animal pieces after designs by Rubens. In 1639 Rubens and Snyders received a follow-up commission for an additional 18 paintings for the hunting pavilion.

After Peter Paul Rubens' death Snyders acted as one of the appraisers of the inventory of Rubens' collection.

In the years 1641 and 1642 Snyders traveled with other artists to the Dutch Republic. In 1646 Snyders was probably in Breda working on a commission. Snyders became a widower in 1647. He died on 19 August 1657 in Antwerp. He died childless and bequeathed his fortune to his sister, a beguine. The Antwerp art dealer Matthijs Musson acquired his extensive art collection which included works of leading 16th and 17th century Flemish and Dutch artists such as Rubens, Anthony van Dyck, Hendrick van Balen, Jan Breughel the Elder, Pieter Bruegel the Elder, Joos van Cleve, Coninxloo, Jacob Foppens van Es, Willem Claeszoon Heda, Jacob Jordaens, Lucas van Leyden, Jan Lievens, Lambert Lombard, Jan Massys, Joachim Patinir, Adriaen van Utrecht and Frans Ykens.

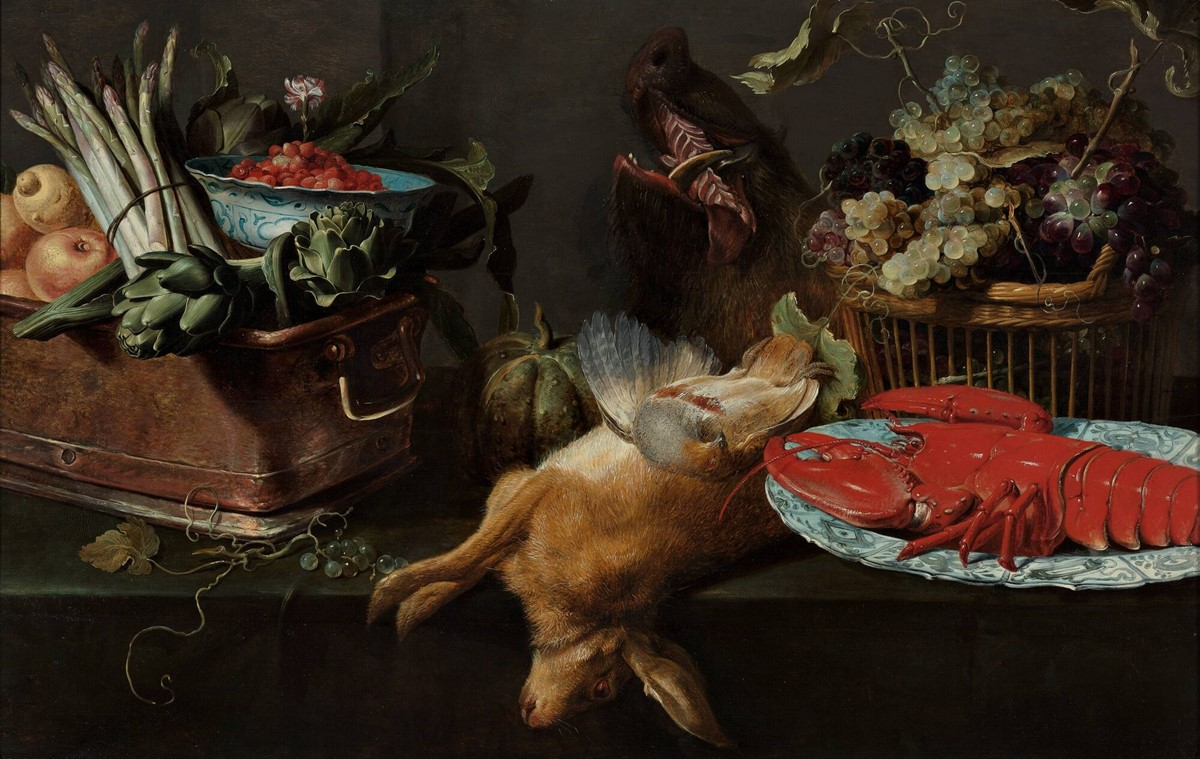
Kitchen still life

He had many apprentices. His pupils are believed to have included Nicasius Bernaerts, Peter van Boucle, Juriaen Jacobsze, Jan Roos and Paul de Vos. Jan Fyt (Joannes Fijt) was a student, and then assistant of Snyders from 1629. Peter van Boucle claimed that he was a pupil of Frans Snyders but there are no written sources available in Antwerp that support this contention. However, there are stylistic similarities in van Boucle's works which suggest that he worked in the circle of Frans Snyders.

== Work ==
=== General ===
Snyders initially devoted himself to painting flowers, fruit and still lifes. Later he turned to painting animals. He was particularly interested in depicting wild animals, which he showed engaged in lively hunts and fierce combats. He was one of the earliest specialist animaliers. His work as an animal painter was very influential on his contemporaries as well as on 18th-century French animaliers such as Jean-Baptiste Oudry and François Desportes. Jean-Baptiste-Siméon Chardin's masterpiece The Ray recalls Snyders' pictorial strength.

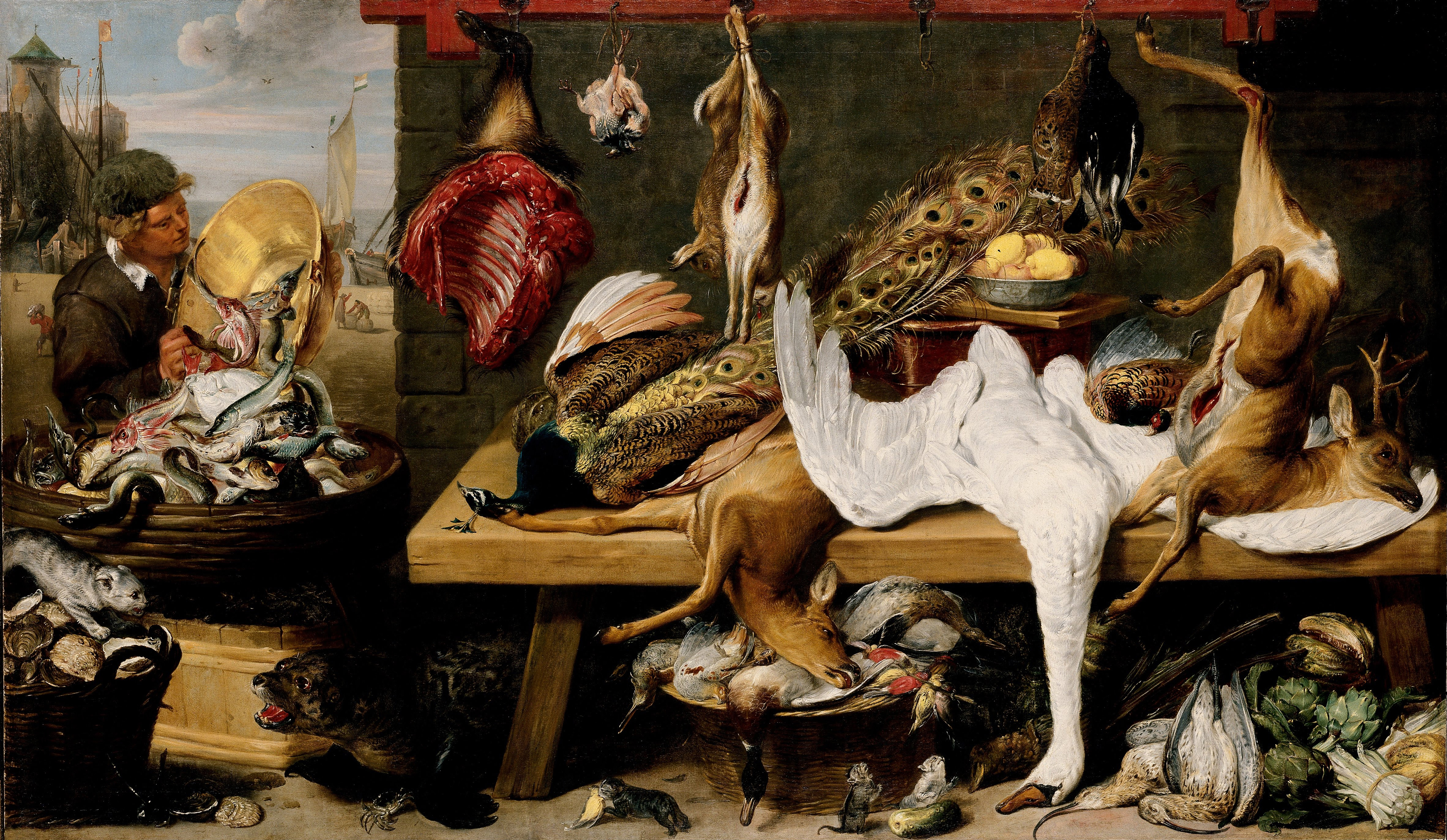
Market scene on a quay

His residence in Italy is believed to have had an important influence on his style of fruit painting. He is likely to have seen Caravaggio's Basket of Fruit in Cardinal Borremeo's collection in Milan.

=== Market and pantry scenes ===
Snyders painted many market scenes and his earliest work in this area was inspired by the work of Pieter Aertsen and Joachim Beuckelaer who had pioneered and developed the genre in 16th century Antwerp. Whereas Aertsen and Beuckelaer often included a religious scene in the background of their market pieces, Snyders dispensed with this. Initially he worked in a Mannerist idiom. His style gradually matured as a result of his exposure to Italian art during his trip to Italy and the work of Rubens after his return to Antwerp. As a result, the dark surroundings of his early still lifes disappeared after 1614 and he became a fine colourist with strong compositional skills allowing him to structure a profusion of disparate objects.

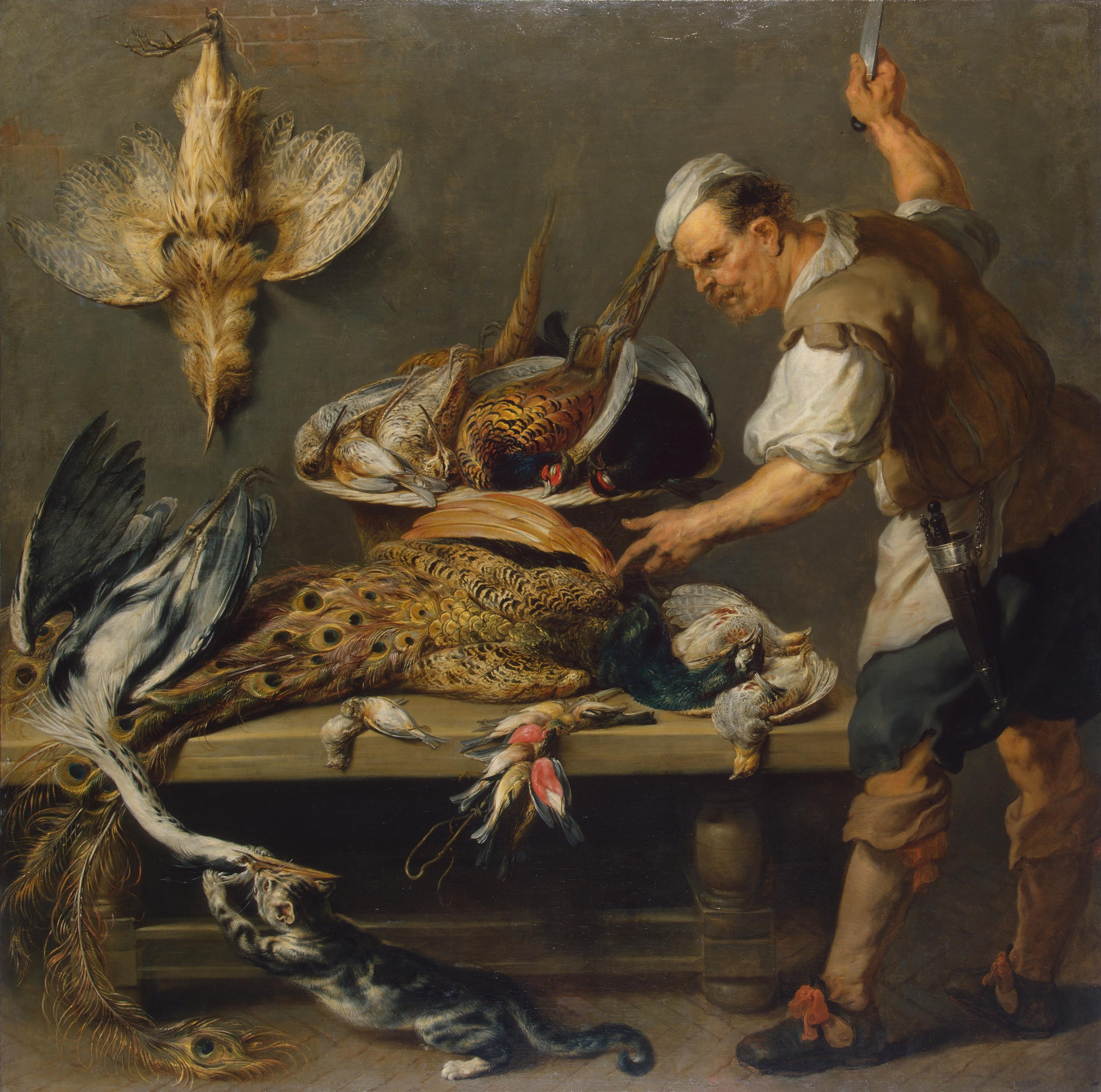
Cook at a kitchen table with dead game

He not only created many large market and pantry scenes and game still lifes, usually including dead deer, he also painted smaller works which were reminiscent of the breakfast pieces and still lifes that originated in northern art around 1600. Rather than continue the descriptive manner of the Antwerp painter Osias Beert, Snyders' innovative still lifes combined objects in groups to form a geometrically structured composition. Recurring motifs were dead hares and birds, tazze (shallow dishes on a tall foot), baskets with grapes and other fruit, enamelled pitchers and Chinese Kraak porcelain.

Snyders typically depicted game in the stage before it is prepared as food. These dead animals therefore resemble hunting trophies, which were often not even intended as food but rather for stuffing. Snyders often included live animals such as cats to create a contrast between the animate and inanimate elements. Snyders' large game pieces were very influential and the Dutch painter Jan Davidsz. de Heem, who worked in Antwerp for a significant period of time took inspiration from Snyders' work to develop his own large-scale game pieces.

The large and abundant still lifes of Snyders have been interpreted in many ways. Some read a propagandistic message into these paintings. The display of the luxurious abundance available in Antwerp which was at the time under Spanish administration possibly served the propagandistic purpose of showing the superiority of Spanish rule over Flanders when compared with Protestant control over the rebellious Northern Netherlands.

While in the Baroque tradition many of his compositions are complex and dynamic some are more focused and quiet. An example of the latter is the Grapes, Peaches and Quinces in a Niche (Museum of Fine Arts, Boston), where his brushwork is also more sketchy than usual.

=== Collaborations ===
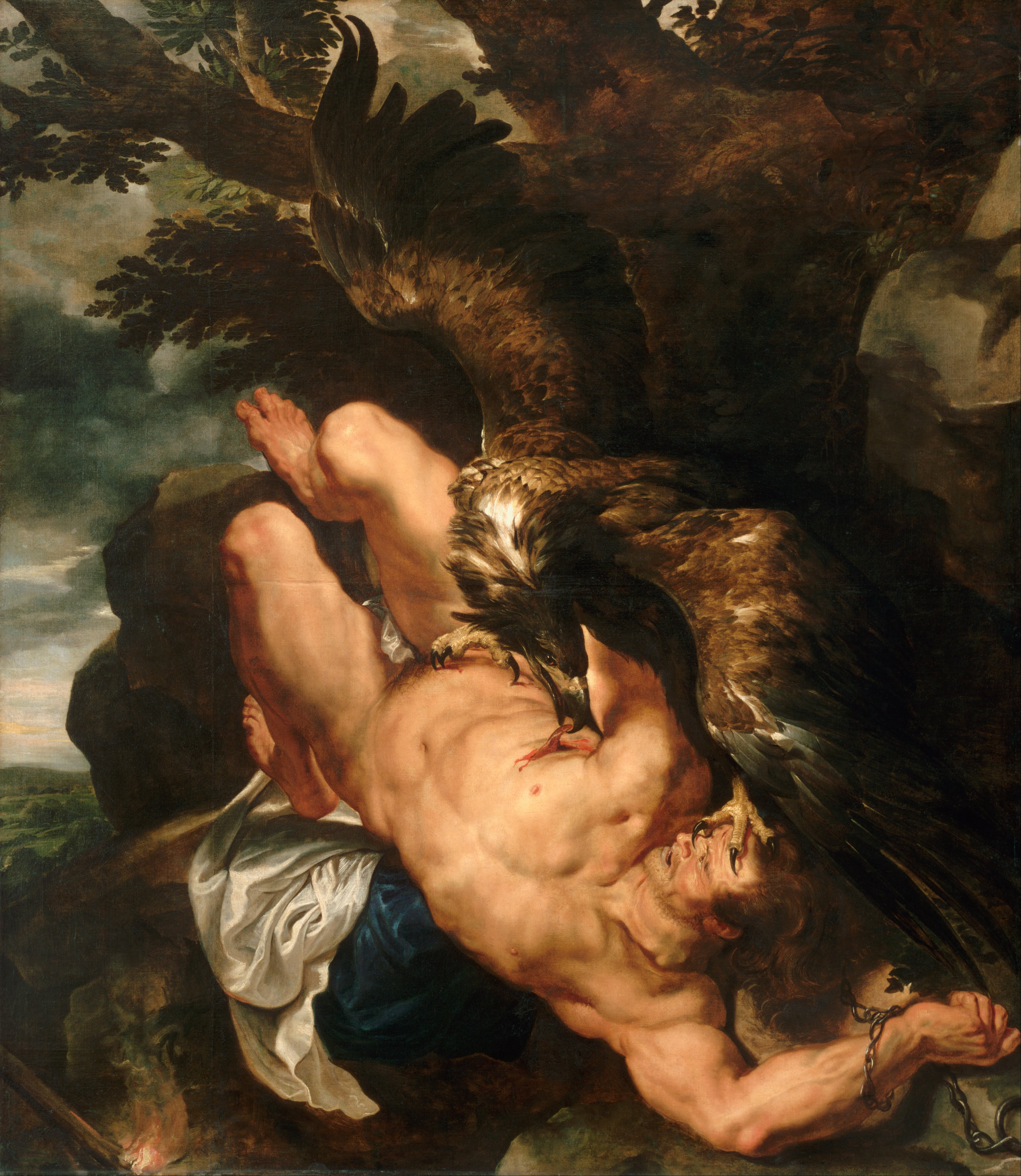
Prometheus Bound, a collaboration with Rubens

Snyders is believed to have been a skilled figure painter in his own right as is evidenced by Jan Breughel the Elder's request that he make a copy after a Titian portrait in the Borromeo collection during his stay in Milan. Even so, he still often collaborated with figure artists such as Rubens, Anthony van Dyck, his brother-in-law Cornelis de Vos, Theodoor van Thulden and Jan Boeckhorst, who painted the figures in compositions to which he added the still life elements. He also collaborated with landscape specialists such as Jan Wildens, who provided the landscape setting for his hunting scenes.

Collaborations with Rubens were particularly frequent. Snyders' expressiveness and ability to render different textures of furs and skins excited the admiration of Rubens. Rubens frequently employed him to paint animals, fruit and still life in his own pictures. Snyders developed a particularly close collaborative relationship with Rubens between 1610 and 1640. Their collaborative efforts are well documented. In the early period of their collaboration, Rubens would paint an oil sketch of the complete composition and mark out clearly where Snyders would have to put his contribution. This has been documented for the painting The Recognition of Philopoemen. It is possible that in this early period Rubens was not sure about Snyders' compositional skills and wanted to show him the way. In the later Prometheus bound the process was reversed and Snyders made a sketch leaving the space for the figure by Rubens. The Recognition of Philopoemen is considered the first Baroque still life with figures. A famous collaboration between Rubens and Snyders is the Medusa (Kunsthistorisches Museum, Vienna). Painted around 1613–1617/1618, this small-scale work showed that Snyders' manner was not only well suited to Rubens' large pieces, but also adaptable to his smaller-scale works. Rubens relied on Snyders to create the visual richness that went hand in hand with his Baroque style, which stressed abundance and bounteousness. The two artists' brushwork was so close that contemporaries had difficulty distinguishing their contributions in collaborative works.

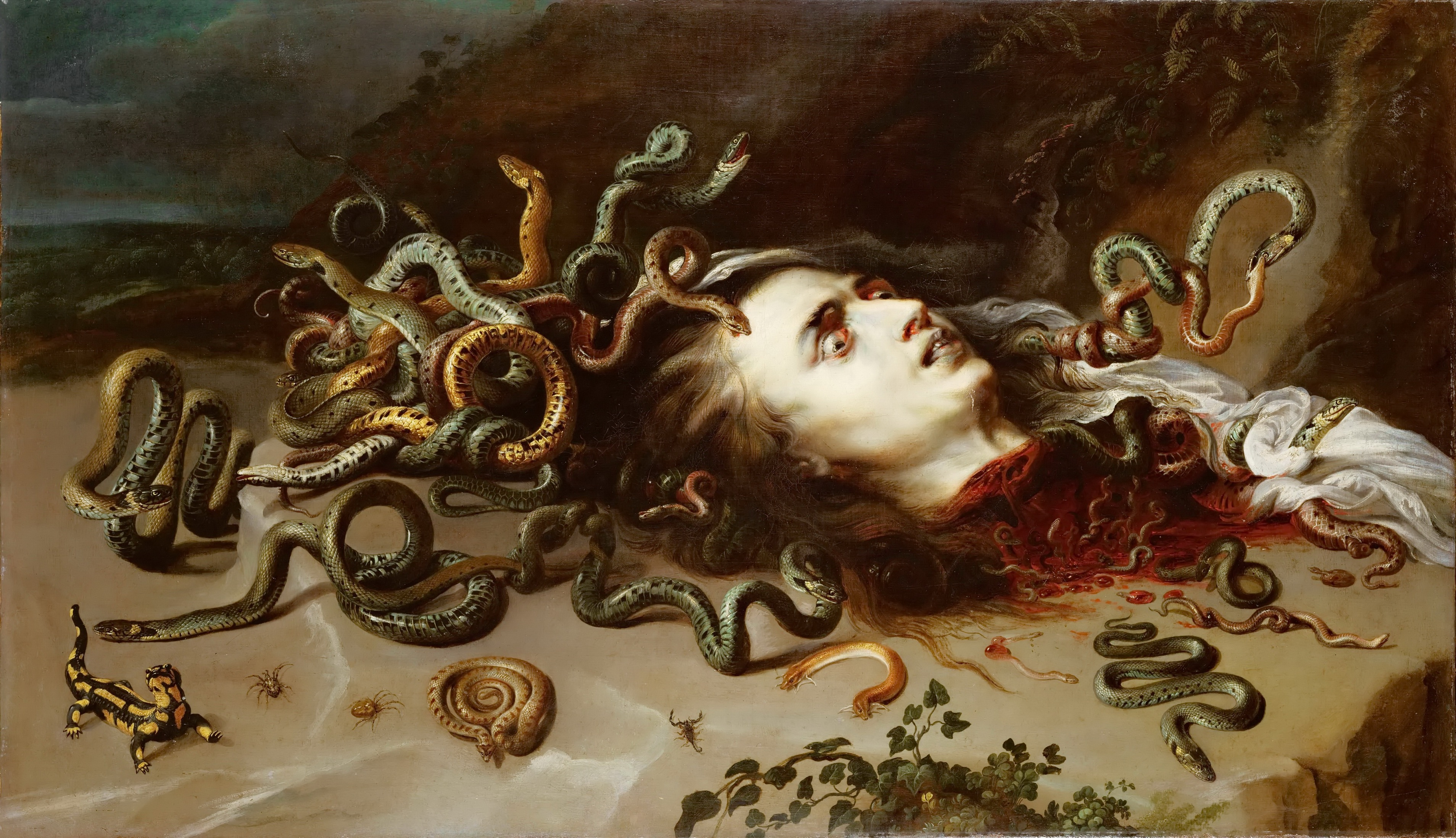
Medusa

His pupil and brother-in-law Paul de Vos was also a regular collaborator with Rubens. One art historian has compared Paul de Vos' contributions to Rubens' hunting scenes with those of Frans Snyders' and found de Vos to be less accurate in the animal anatomy and less accomplished in the psychological expression of the animals. Other art historians regard the hunting scenes of de Vos as more dynamic and evidencing a more personal style when compared with those of Snyders, who was more a still life painter. The expressive style and motifs of Rubens' animal paintings had an important influence on both Snyders and de Vos.

Snyders also painted the still life elements for other Antwerp painters such as Jacob Jordaens, Thomas Willeboirts Bosschaert, Jan Janssens and other artists. Frans Snyders collaborated with his second brother-in-law Cornelis de Vos. An example is the Still life with fruit and vegetables, which likely represents a larder of a fine house. The impression given by this composition is one of abundance as well as chaos. Closer inspection shows that the produce is arranged in a hierarchy reflecting their value and rarity. Cheaper root vegetables are on the ground while highly prized peas and asparagus are placed in the basket on the right.

=== Animalier ===
Snyders was the first artist to concentrate on incidents exclusively featuring animals in everyday environments. In these creations animals such as dogs, cats and monkeys were the sole protagonists. The scenes included fights between animals, hunts by animals, scenes from fables and symbolic representations.

Concert of Birds

One of the symbolic representations that Snyders created and to which he returned regularly is the concert of birds. Compositions on this theme represent different species of birds perched on tree trunks in the form of a concert of birds, sometimes with a musical score. The theme of the concert of birds predates the courtly fashion of the Baroque period of maintaining aviaries.

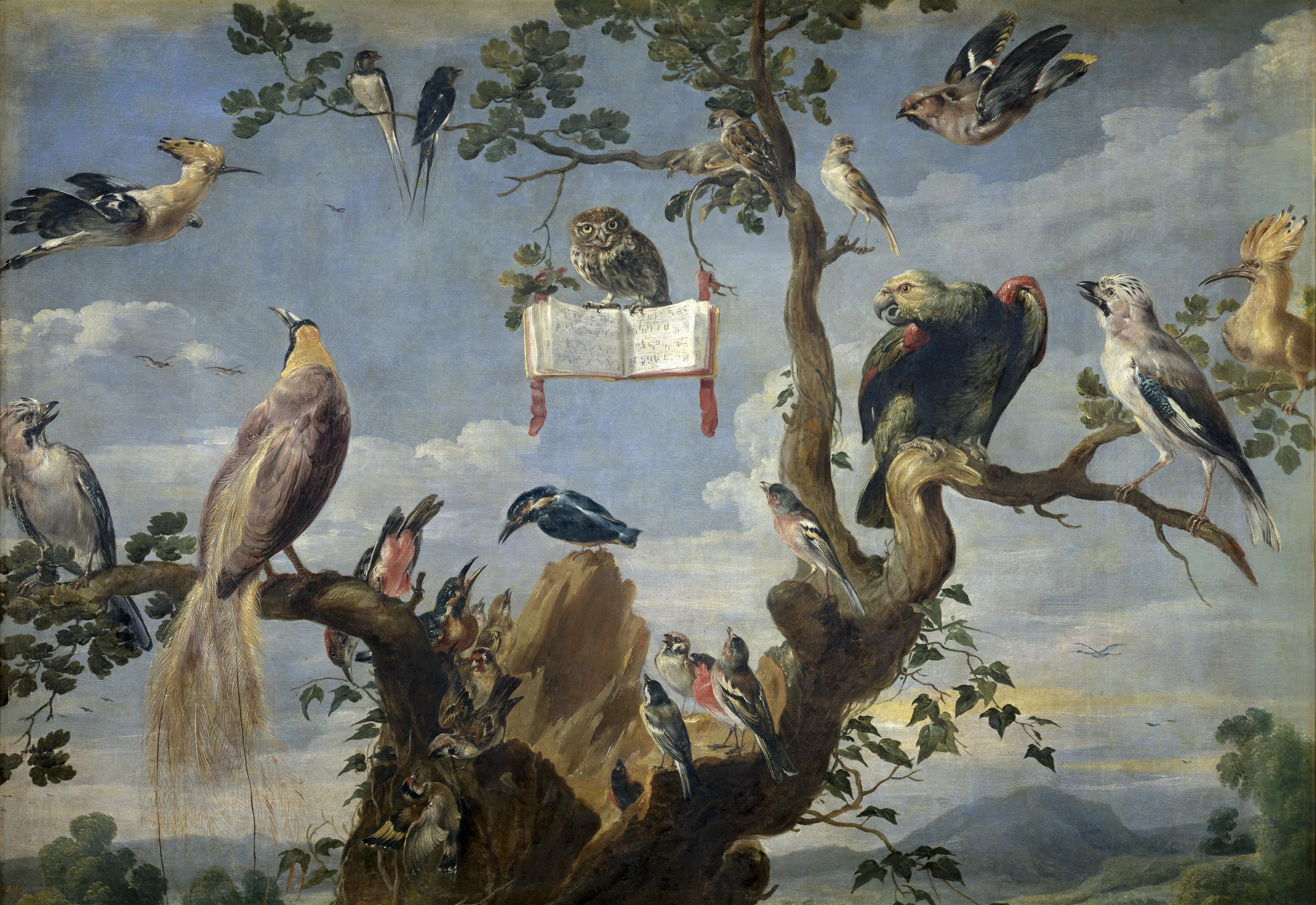
Concert of Birds

The theme has its roots in the representations of Aeolus with birds in the Middle Ages, which became very popular at the end of the 16th century. Its symbolic meaning is linked to the representation of the birds of Saint Francis of Assisi and to the devotion to Our Lady of the Birds. According to legend, in the 13th century a flock of birds had been observed gathering near a grove of beech trees outside Brussels. They had been attracted to that location by an image of the Virgin clamped between the branches of the trees. A Franciscan chapel dedicated to the Virgin was then built. It was destroyed during the iconoclastic fury of the Beeldenstorm in the 16th century but reconstructed at the end of the century. A particular feature of the chapel were the bird cages that were suspended from the ceiling. The birds in the cages contributed their song to the liturgy in the chapel. Snyders is said to have had a special relationship with the Franciscan order and he wanted to be buried in the Franciscan habit. In addition to this religious connotation, the concert of birds is also regarded as an allegory of the sense of hearing. Other interpretations are that the concert represents Wisdom, as the owl, which is the animal representing this quality, is sometimes depicted as the conductor of the bird concerts. A further interpretation is that the concert of birds symbolically alludes to harmony and natural regulation, in the sense of balance with nature. These concepts are embodied in the systematization of the birds' song. So, more generally, the concert of birds imagery refers to the political harmony and social order enjoyed by the owners of these paintings during the time the Southern Netherlands were governed by the Archdukes of Austria Albert and Isabella Clara Eugenia. This explains the success of the concert of birds paintings in bourgeois and aristocratic circles. Various followers of Snyders also painted this theme: in the Spanish Netherlands there were Paul de Vos, Jan Fyt and Jan van Kessel the Elder; in the Dutch Republic, Gijsbert d'Hondecoeter, his son Melchior d'Hondecoeter, Abraham Busschop and Jacobus Victors reworked the subject by making it more courtly; and in France the Flemish expatriates Nicasius Bernaerts or Pieter Boel also created compositions on the theme.

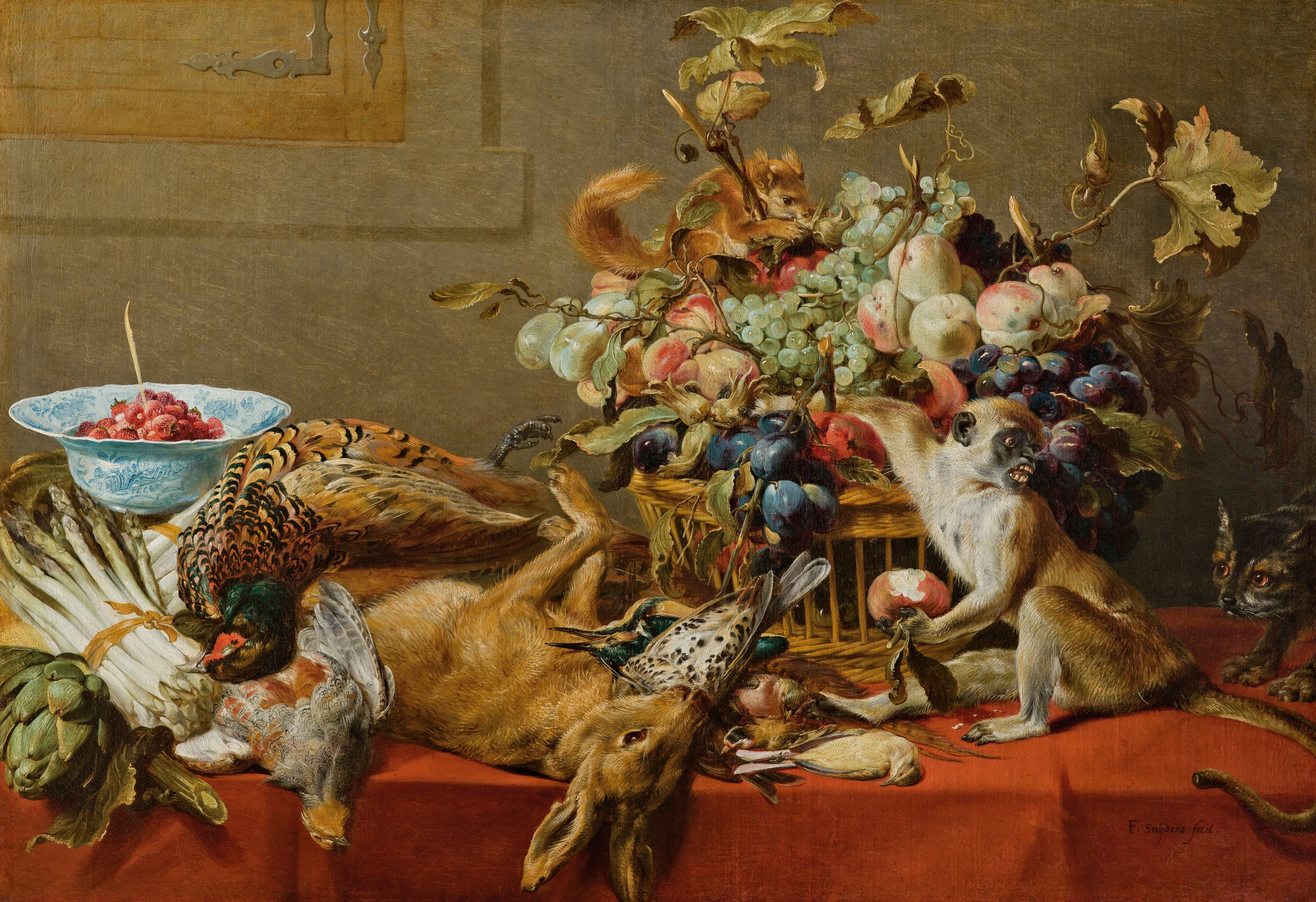
Still life with fruit, dead game, vegetables, a monkey, squirrel and cat

One of the four Concert of Birds pictures by Frans Snyders in the Prado Museum shows an owl on a branch. The owl conducts the other 15 species of birds shown in the composition while it holds a musical score between its legs. As in many of Snyders' compositions, the larger birds are placed near the border and protect the smaller birds in the middle. Some exotic species alien to European are included such as the Raggiana bird-of-paradise. Some fragments of the score are visible and show the titles of the voices, which are written in French. The composer and the work have not been identified. It seems a composition for four voices and is possibly a French song.

Monkey business

His compositions with monkeys wreaking havock became very popular. The Louvre collection holds four such monkey-themed paintings. Three of them show capuchin monkeys pillaging baskets of fruit and toppling dishes in pantries or in an outdoor setting. The monkeys are painted with naturalism, neither idealizing nor caricaturing them.

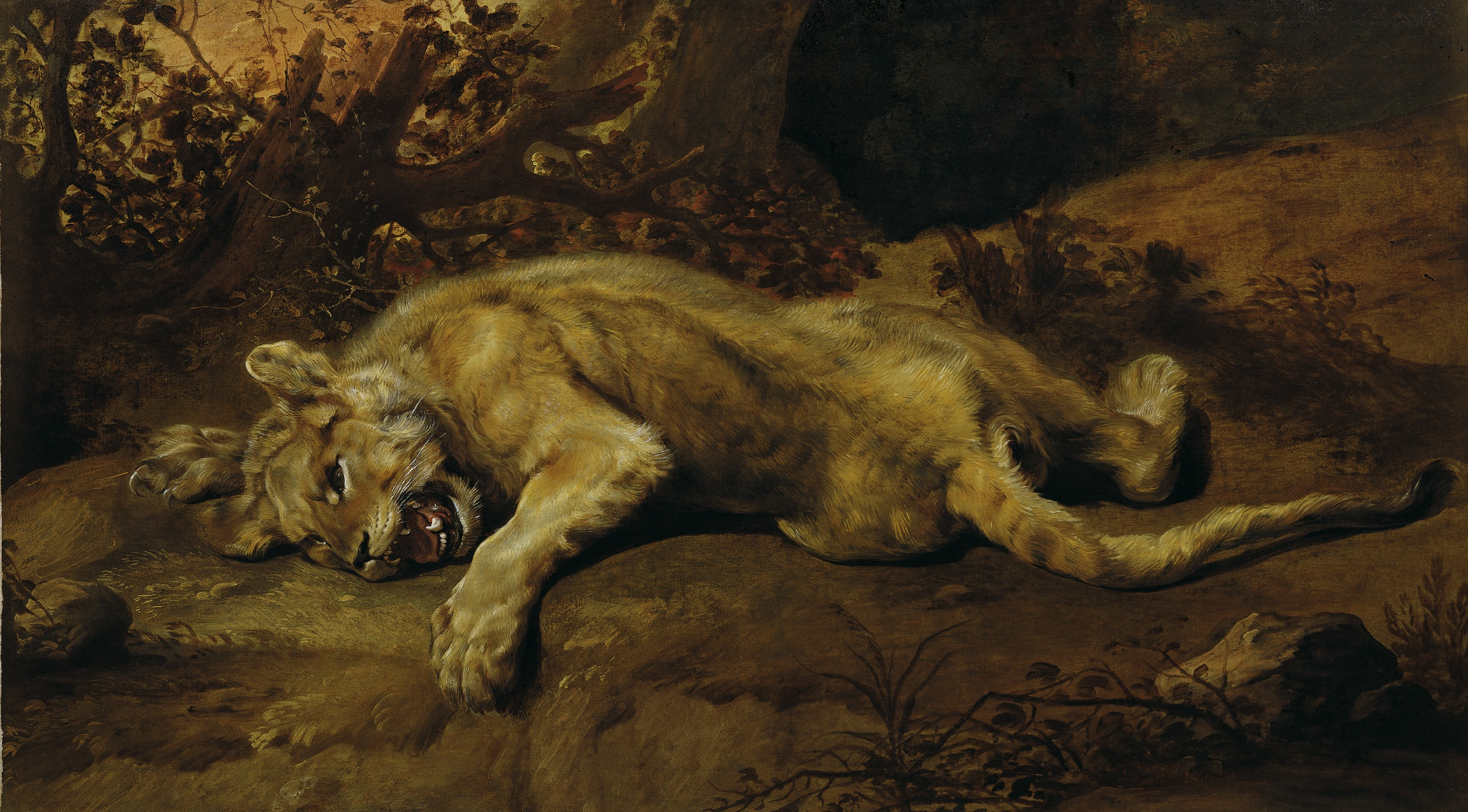
Lying lioness

While the monkey had since the Middle Ages symbolized the sinner - a greedy, lecherous creature, driven by its senses only – during the 16th and 17th centuries it became the symbol of stupidity. Through their uncontrolled grabbing and consuming of food the monkeys show their barbaric nature which is driven solely by animal instinct and desire. The Louvre compositions with capuchin monkeys can also be interpreted as a form of vanitas paintings: the fruit in these still lifes is appetizing yet bound to perish. The fruit thus symbolizes the brevity and futility of life. The compositions can further be regarded as illustrations of the risk of poor household management which is driven solely by the satisfaction of the senses.
