= Jacques Linard =

French painter

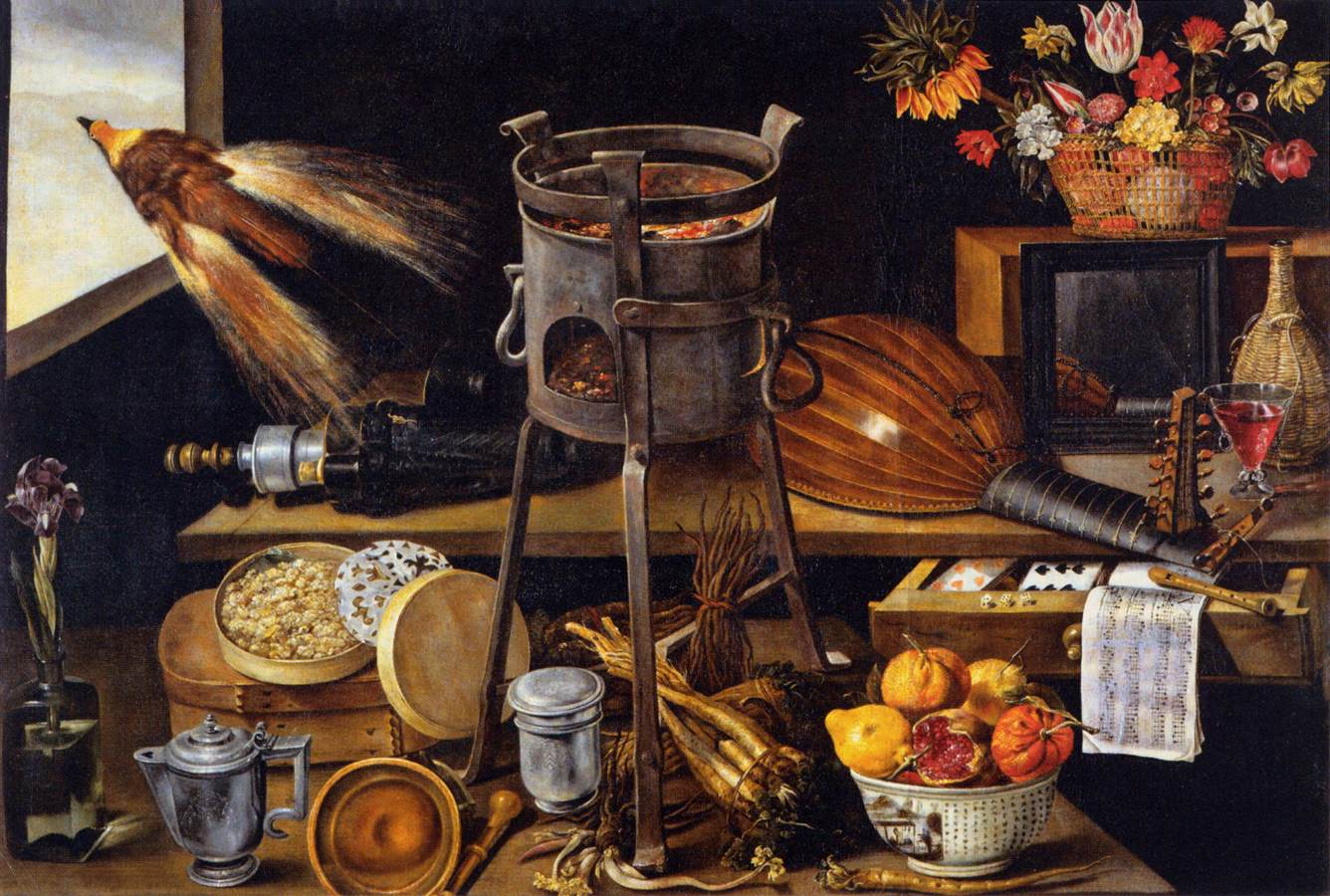
The Five Senses and the Four Elements

Jacques Linard (1597 – September 1645) was a French painter who specialized in still-lifes.

== Biography ==
Linard was born in Troyes and baptised on 6 September 1597. His first records of being of artist was in the 1620s. He was married in 1626 to the daughter of a Parisian Master Painter. In 1631 he is quoted as a painter.

His father, Jehan Linard, was also an artist, known to have been active in Troyes towards the end of the 16th century. None of his works are currently known, although guild records refer to him as a "Master Painter".

The earliest record of Jacques' presence in Paris comes from 1626. Five years later, in 1631, he married Marguerite Tréhoire (died c.1663), daughter of the painter Romain Tréhoire (died 1635). That same year, he was first officially recorded as a painter and a "Royal Chamberlain". He and Marguerite had three sons who died in infancy and a daughter, also Marguerite, who married Jean-Joseph Nau (1642–1698), a Counselor to the King. His sister married Claude Baudesson and gave birth to the still-life painter Nicolas Baudesson.

Only about fifty works of his have been positively identified. Of all the artists of the period who are classified as "Northern Realists", he appears to have been the first in France to base his style on and create themes relating to the "Five Senses" and the "Four Elements". His work is believed to have inspired Louise Moillon, the most famous still-life painter of that time.

He died in Paris and was interred at the Church of Saint-Nicolas-des-Champs.

== Sources ==
- Mickaël Szanto, "Pour Jacques Linard, peintre de natures mortes (Troyes,1597 - Paris, 1645)", in: Bulletin de la Société de l'Histoire de l'Art français, 2001, pages 25-61, 2002.
- Philippe Nusbaumer, Jacques Linard 1597-1645, Catalogue de l'œuvre peint, Abbeville, 2006 ISBN 978-2-951186-06-4
