= Smout =

Smout is a surname. Notable people with the surname include:

- Sir Arthur Smout (1888–1961), Director-General of Small Arms Production for the British Armed Forces during World War II
- Christopher Smout (born 1933), Scottish academic, historian, and author
- Dominicus Smout (before 1671 – after 1733) Flemish painter
- Edward Smout (1898–2004), Australian soldier
- Kees Smout (1876–1961), Dutch sculptor
- Lucas Smout the Elder (f 1631–1674), Flemish painter
- Lucas Smout the Younger (1671–1713), Flemish painter

Smoot, Smootz, Smot, Smut, and Smutz are also American and European surnames derived from the name Smout.

== See also ==
- Smot (disambiguation)
