= Godfried Maes =

Flemish painter, draughtsman and tapestry designer (1649–1700)

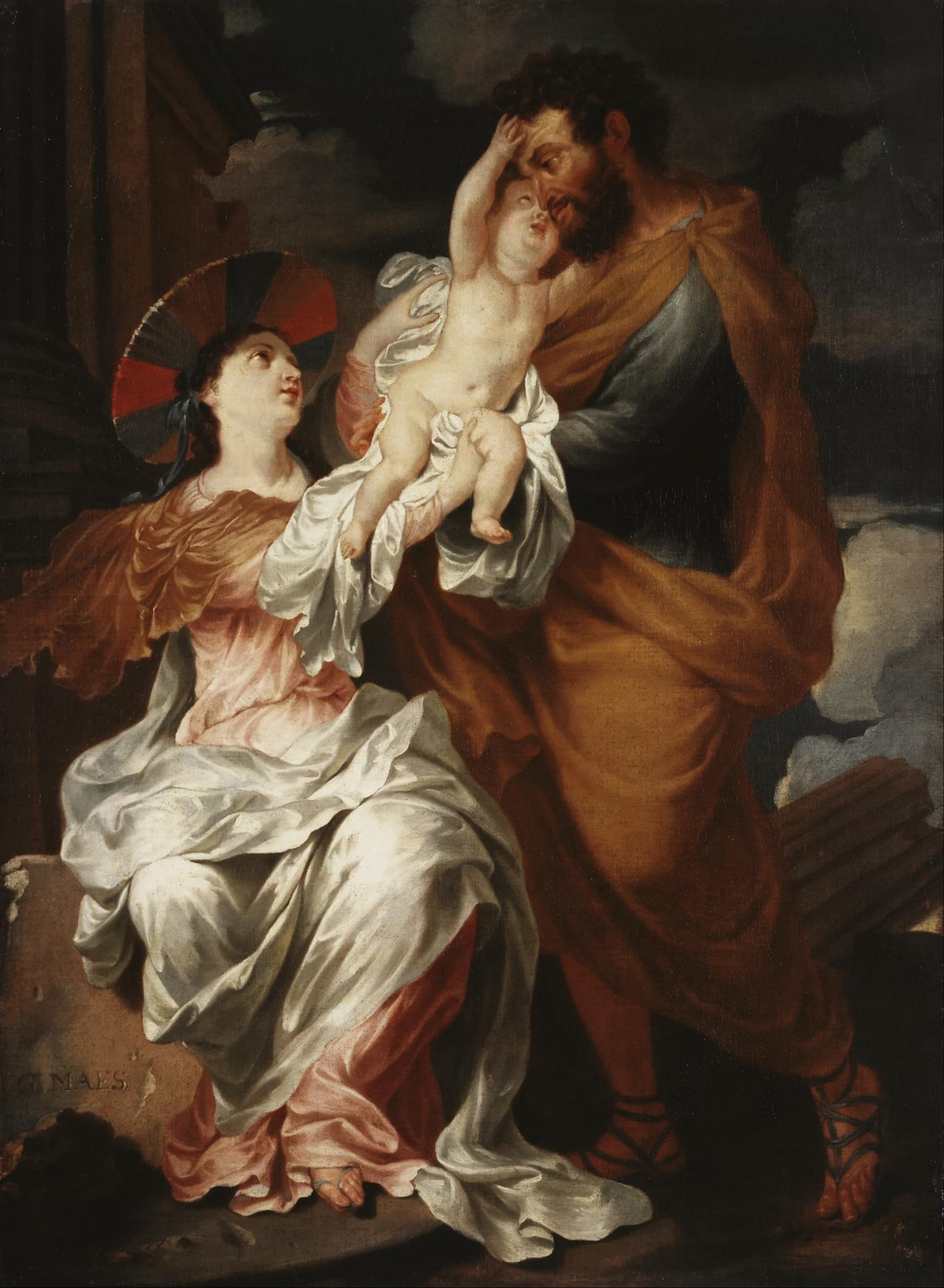
Holy Family

Godfried Maes (baptised on 15 August 1649 Antwerp – 30 May 1700, Antwerp) was a Flemish painter, draughtsman and designer of tapestries. He was active as a painter of altarpieces and allegorical scenes. He was a prolific draughtsman who made designs for tapestry workshops, publishers and house decorations. His patrons included leading personalities in the Southern Netherlands.

== Life ==
Godfried Maes was born in Antwerp as the son of Godfried Maes (died 1679) and Anna Eeckelman. He trained with his father and was in the guild year 1664-1665 registered at the Antwerp Guild of Saint Luke as a pupil of the history painter Pieter van Lint. He became a master in the Antwerp Guild of Saint Luke in 1672. He married Josina Baeckelandt in 1675. The couple did not have any children. He became dean of the Guild in 1682.

Godfried Maes was active in Antwerp in the period 1664–1700. His work was very well received throughout the Southern Netherlands. He completed commissions for churches and private clients in Antwerp, Brussels and Liège. He worked for Eugen Alexander Franz, 1st Prince of Thurn and Taxis in Brussels for whom he realized ceiling decorations with allegorical scenes glorifying the family of Thurn and Taxis. Between 1697 and 1700, he worked for Maximilian II Emanuel, Elector of Bavaria, at the time the Governor of the Southern Netherlands, on the decoration of the ceiling of his residence, the Palace of Coudenberg, in Brussels. The design represented the figures of Peace and Freedom accompanied by the muses Calliope and Clio.

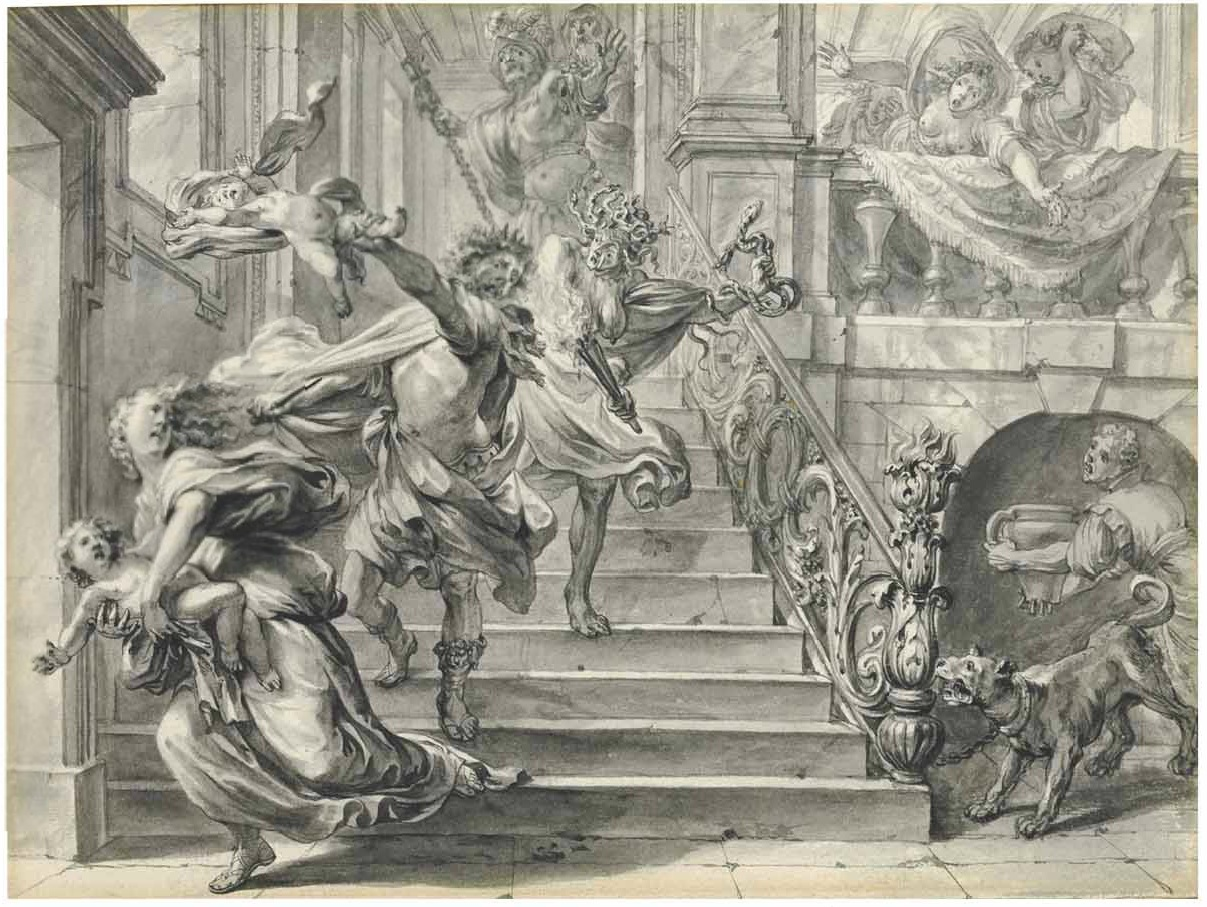
Athamas tearing apart his children

He was the teacher of Willem Ignatius Kerricx, Matheus Neckens, Anthonie du Pré, Dominicus Smout, Jacob Sucquet and Gerard Thomas.

He died in Antwerp on 30 May 1700 as is testified by the inscription on his grave in the St James Church in Antwerp.

== Work ==
=== Classicist ===
Godfried Maes painted religious, mythological and allegorical themes on a grand scale. He is therefore often regarded as a representative of the last generation of Flemish artists who practised Baroque painting, before it developed into Rococo. However, his work shows more affinity with the Classicism that had developed in Italy and France in the second half of the 17th century.

=== Metamorphoses ===
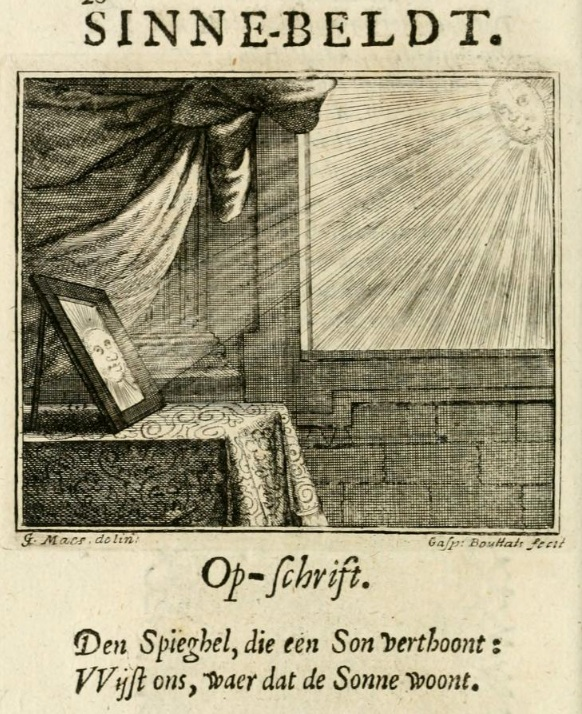
Emblem from De ongemaskerde liefde des hemels

Maes made 83 preparatory designs for an edition of the Metamorphoses of Ovidius. Maes' widow sold 45 of these drawings to the Dutch art dealer Jacob de Wit in 1717. The drawings remained together until 1762 when they were sold and dispersed. The designs were apparently never used in a publication prior to the sale of the drawings to de Wit. The drawings and drawings after Maes' designs were later engraved by Bernard Picart et Peter van Gunst for the 1732 edition of the French translation of the Metamorphoses by the abbot Antoine Banier. The design drawings have become split up and some are kept at the Metropolitan Museum of Art (3 drawings), Fondation Custodia (two drawings) and the British Museum while a set of 18 was sold on 13 January 2013 by Christie’s.

Maes' designs for the Metamorphoses show a good knowledge of anatomy and a taste for drawing. These drawings reveal a secure and precise brush, an inclination for idealization and a search for perfection. They reveal the influence of Antique models and Roman examples of the Renaissance and a similarity to the achievements of the French artists of the late 17th century. However, his compositions do not deny his Northern heritage in their interest for minute detail and realism. These drawings show Maes to be one of the most interesting artists of the Flemish classicism at the end of the 17th century. The works of Maes form a kind of link between the Franco-Roman Classicism of Nicolas Poussin and the Flemish classical tradition, just like the works of the painter Gérard de Lairesse were for Dutch painting.

=== Cartoons ===
He provided cartoons to the Flemish tapestry workshops. He is recorded as a designer for the Brussels tapestry workshop of Urbanus Leyniers. A number of Brussels tapestry producers executed suites of The Seasons and Elements and The Four Continents after designs by Godfried Maes.

=== Publications ===
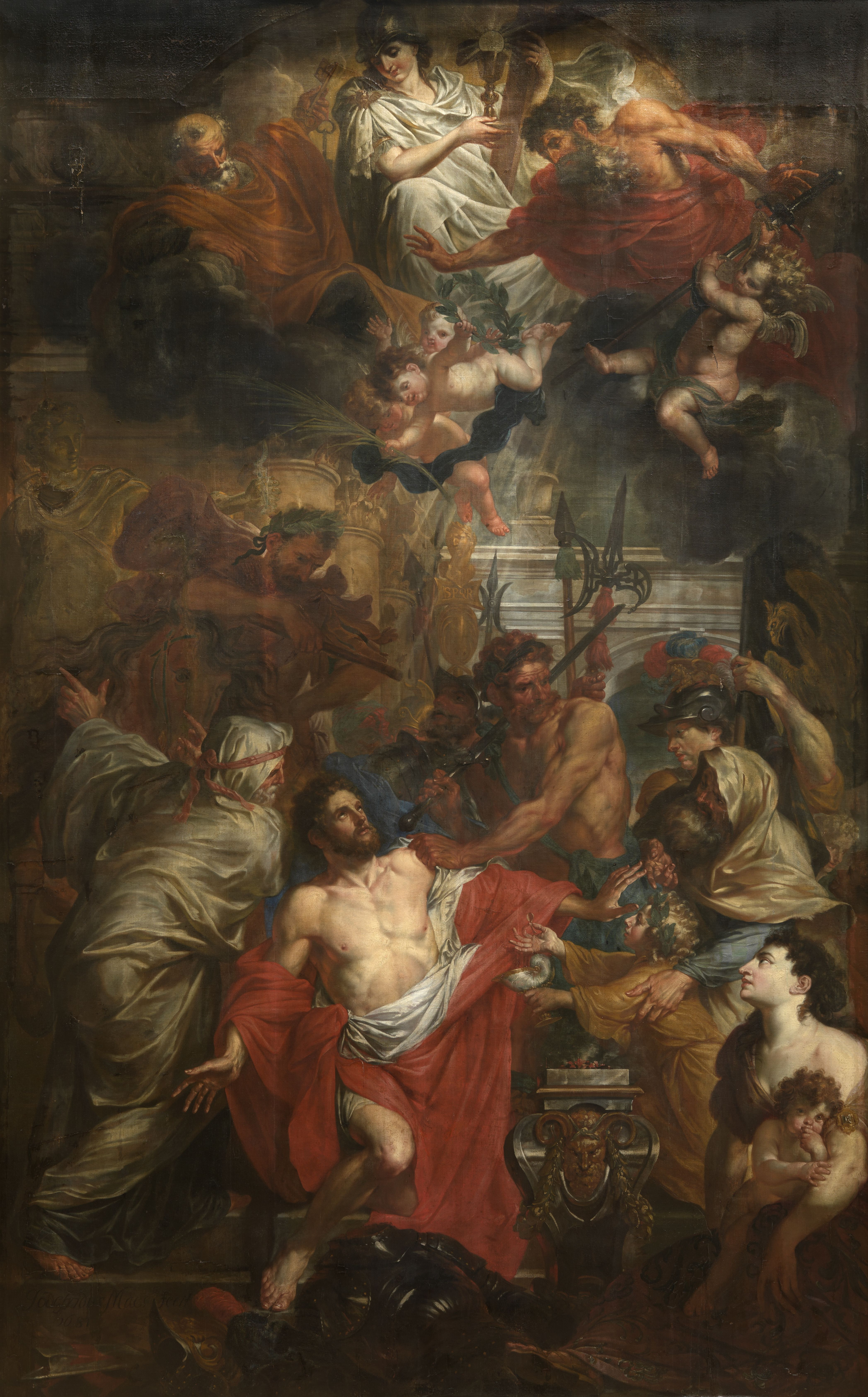
Martyrdom of Saint George the Great

He designed illustrations for various publications. These publications include:

- Joannes à Castro, De ongemaskerde liefde des hemels, tot weder-liefde door verscheyden beweegh-redenen, aen-spraecken ende betrachtinghen, published by the widow of Ioris Willemsens, 1686. An emblem book by the friar Joannes à Castro for which Gaspar Bouttats engraved the illustrations after Maes' designs.
- Cornelis de Bie, Gaspar Bouttats, Godfried Maes, P. Starckmann, Den wegh der devghden, beset met scherpe dornen van quellinghen en onrechtveerdighe vervolginghen naer d'eeuwicheyt, published by Jacob Mesens, 1697
- Joannes a Castro, Cornelis de Bie, Sébastien Jacobi, Godfried Maes, Gaspar Bouttats, Den boeck van het stervende leven der menschen. Bevattende hunne toe-vallen in korte neep-dichten, oft epigrammata ... Verdeelt in dry deelen, published by Guilliam Engelbert Gymnicus, 1689

=== Decorative designs ===
Maes made several designs for decorative paintings. Sotheby’s sold a design for a ceiling design on 8 July 2009 in London (lot 121). Two other designs for decorative paintings by Maes are known: the Death of Achilles (Ashmolean Museum, Oxford) and a design for an overdoor of Minerva flanked by the four Cardinal Virtues (Leiden University print room).
