= Dominicus Smout =

Flemish painter

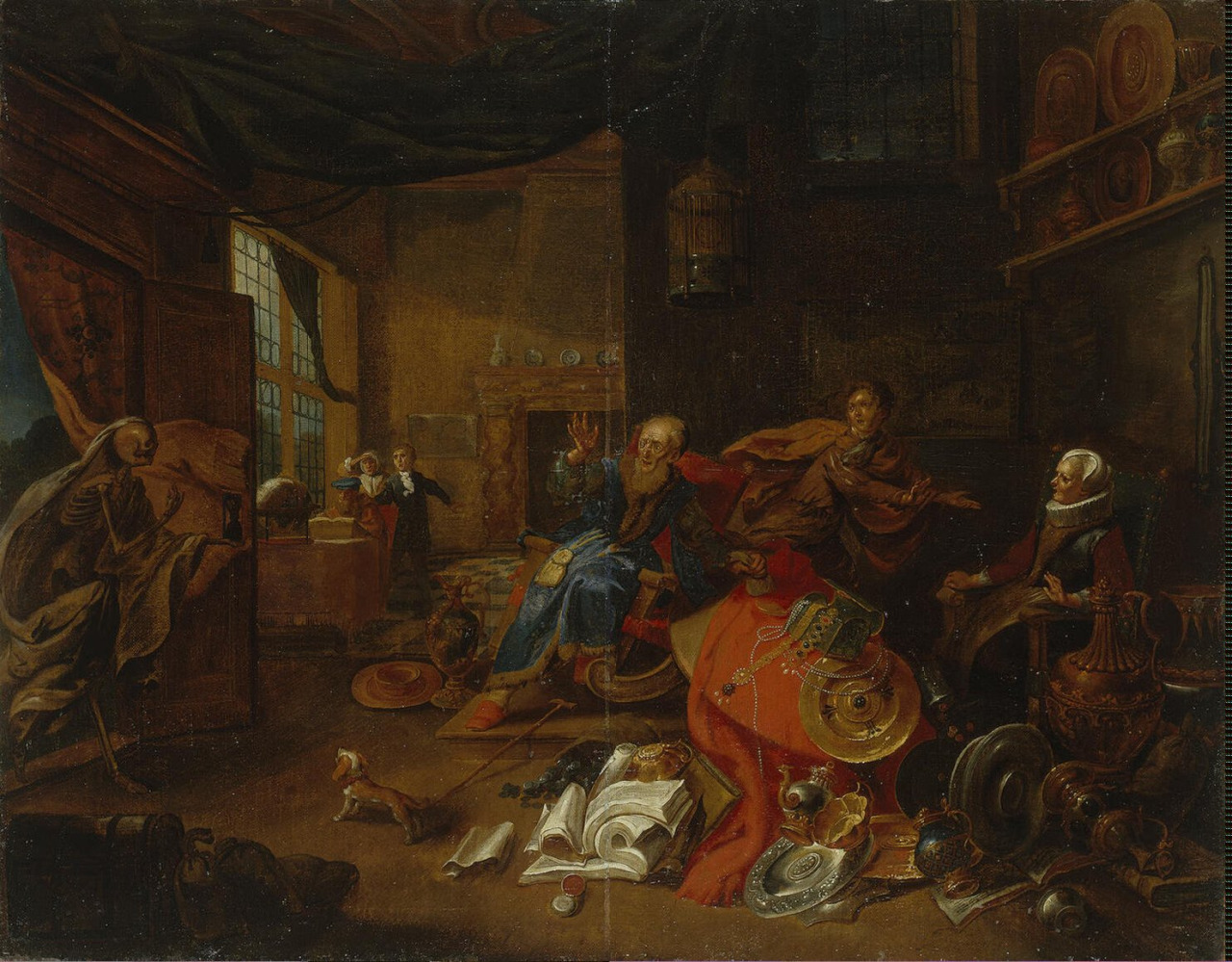
The miser and death

Dominicus Smout or Dominicus Smouts (before 1671 – 1742 or later) was a Flemish painter of genre scenes who was active in Antwerp between 1683 and 1733.

== Life ==
Details about the life of Dominicus Smout are scarce and his birth and death dates are unknown. It is assumed that he was born in Antwerp as the oldest child of the painter and art dealer Lucas Smout the Elder and Anna Maria Tijssens. His father had studied under Artus Wolffort and was a figure painter. His younger brother Lucas Smout the Younger became a painter of coastal and country scenes while two of his sisters married painters. His mother was a member of the prominent Tijssens or Tyssens family of artists in Antwerp, which included artists such as Jan Baptist Tijssens the Younger. His father died in 1674 and his mother in 1686. His sister Clara Catharina continued to operate the art and painting materials business of her parents. She later married the battle painter Gonzales Franciscus Casteels. Another sister married the painter Jacob Herreyns the Elder.

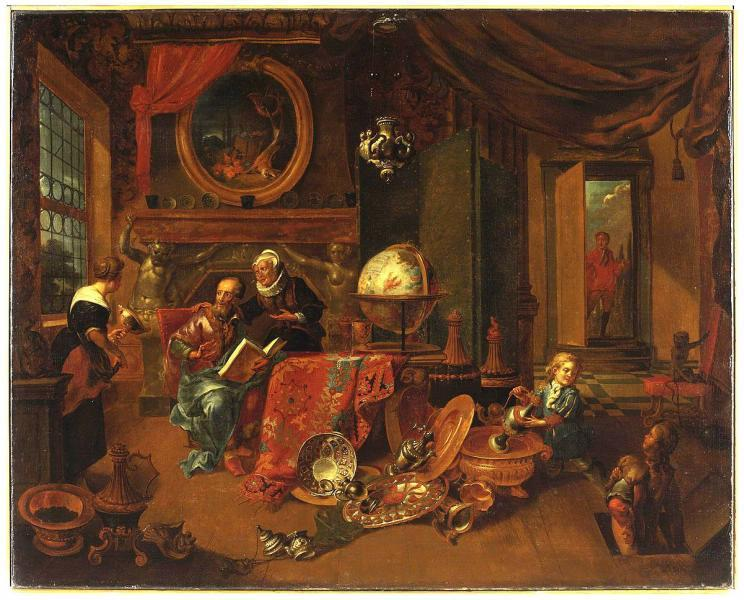
The miser

Dominicus Smout was registered in 1683–1684 in the registers of the Antwerp Guild of Saint Luke as a pupil of the history painter Godfried Maes. In 1700-1701 he was registered as a 'wijnmeester' (i.e. the family member of an existing or former member) of the Guild. The last records regarding Dominicus Smout in the Guild's books date to 1733.

Smout appears to have been active in Antwerp throughout his career. He remained a bachelor. He made a will in 1742 in which he left all his drawings, sketches and prints to his nephews Franciscus en Carolus Casteels, who likely also were painters.

== Work ==
Although Smout had a fairly long career, very few works are currently attributed to him. While he has been described by some as a history painter, the works currently ascribed to him are all genre paintings mainly dealing with two subjects: artist studios and the miser.

The artist studio genre developed in the 15th century in the Low Countries when artists starting representing themselves in elevated historical guises, either as the Evangelist Luke painting Mary and the Infant Jesus or as famous painters from antiquity such as Apelles, painter to Alexander the Great. In the 17th-century Dutch painters inverted the traditions of the two preceding centuries by rejecting historical guises and idealised settings and substituting more direct, true-to-life images of the painter at work. In Flanders, important practitioners of the genre were Gerard Thomas and Balthasar van den Bossche and some of Smout's works have occasionally been attributed to these better known artists.

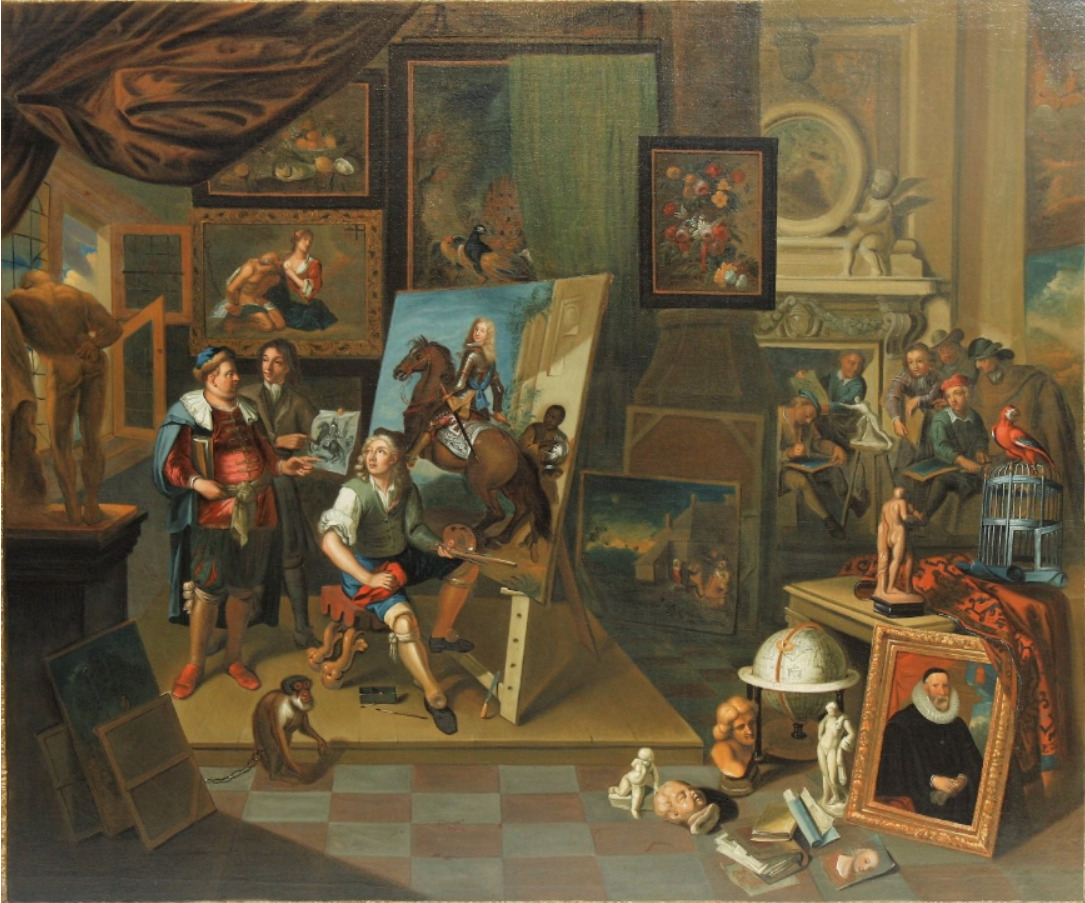
Studio of an artist

The theme of the miser and, in particular 'death and the miser', goes back to the 15th century Netherlandish art. An example is the work Death and the Miser by Hieronymus Bosch dated to 1494 or later. A number of Smout's works deal with this theme. As is common in the treatment of this subject matter, Smout uses it to include lavish still lifes of precious objects such as expensive metal plates, antiques, globes, coffers likely filled with coins or other treasury, etc., which are then combined with vanitas symbols such as still lives of game (referencing death) and even the physical entry of Death itself in the form of a skeleton. A painting depicting A philosopher in his studio, which contains similar imagery as the miser pictures, was sold at Bonhams (18 January 2012, London, lot 238) as 'Circle of Balthasar van den Bossche' but has now been attributed to Dominicus Smout.
