= Smot =

Smot may refer to:

- Smot (chanting), Buddhist chanting in Cambodia
- Simple Magnetic Overunity Toy, claiming perpetual motion
- Free Interprofessional Association of Workers (SMOT), Russia, subjected to political abuse of psychiatry in the Soviet Union

== See also ==
- Smout, a surname
