= Gonzales Franciscus Casteels =

Flemish painter

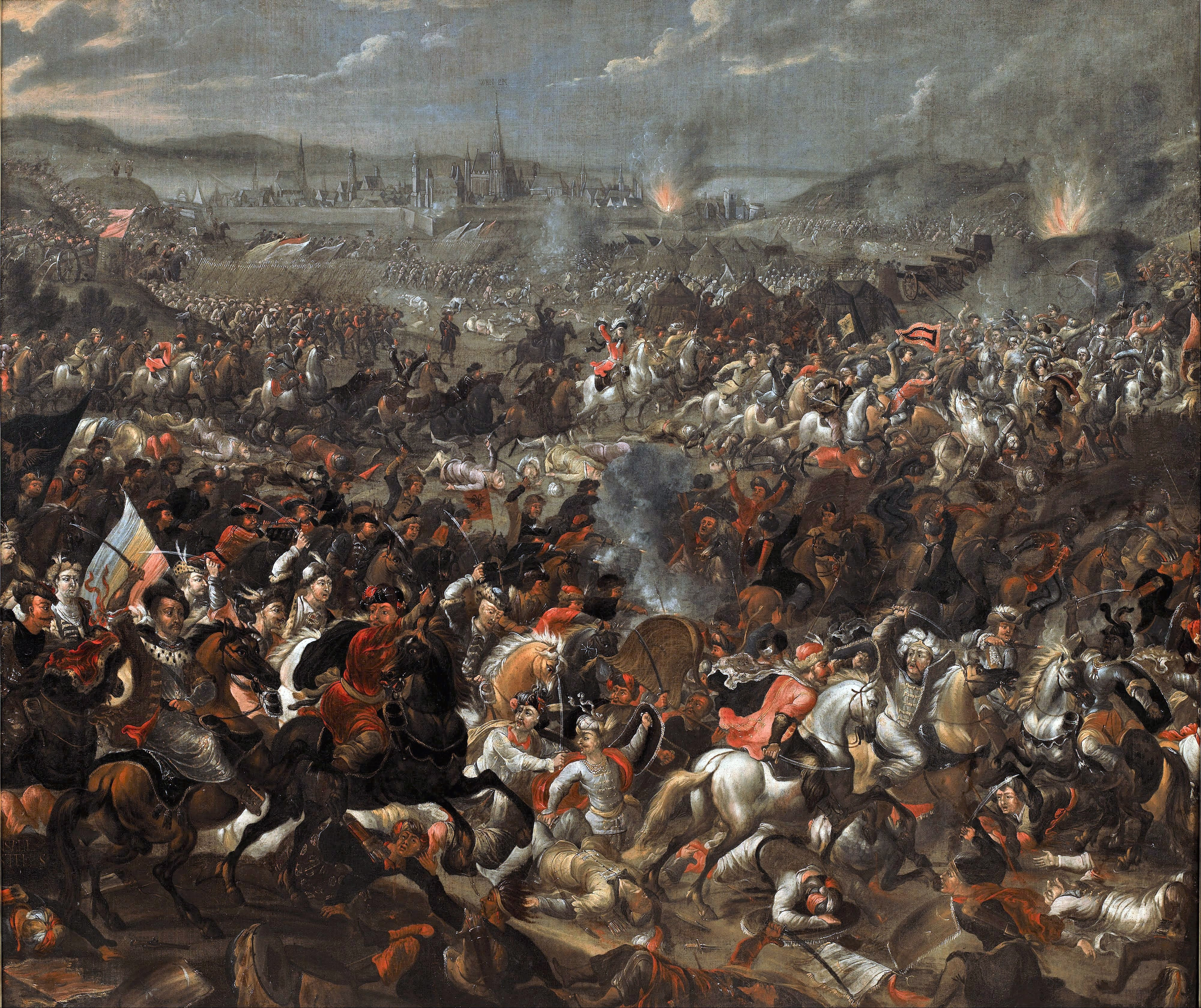
Battle of Vienna

Gonzales Franciscus Casteels (? – Antwerp, after 1709) was a Flemish painter. He worked in Antwerp and is known for two works depicting battle scenes.

== Life ==
Very little is known about the life of Casteels. His date and place of birth are not known. He was likely a member of the artist family Casteels which produced a large number of battle painters in the second half of the 17th century. He was admitted as a 'wijnmeester' ('wine master', meaning a son of a master) in the Antwerp Guild of St. Luke in the guild year 1695–1696. As he had already produced a signed work in 1686 it is likely that before becoming a master in the Guild he worked in the family workshop.

He married Clara Catharina Smout, the sister of the painters Lucas Smout the Younger and Dominicus Smout. Through this marriage he was also a brother in law of the painter Jacob Herreyns the Elder who had married his wife's sister. His wife operated an art and painting materials business which she had inherited from her parents. Her brother Lucas, who suffered from gout and was a bachelor, lived with the Casteels family. The couple had two sons called Franciscus en Carolus who likely also became painters as their uncle Dominicus Smout left them all his drawings, sketches and prints in his will made in 1742.

The artist and his wife made their wills on 14 January 1709. The wills mention that they were living on the Schoenmarkt in Antwerp. This is the last record on the artist.

== Work ==
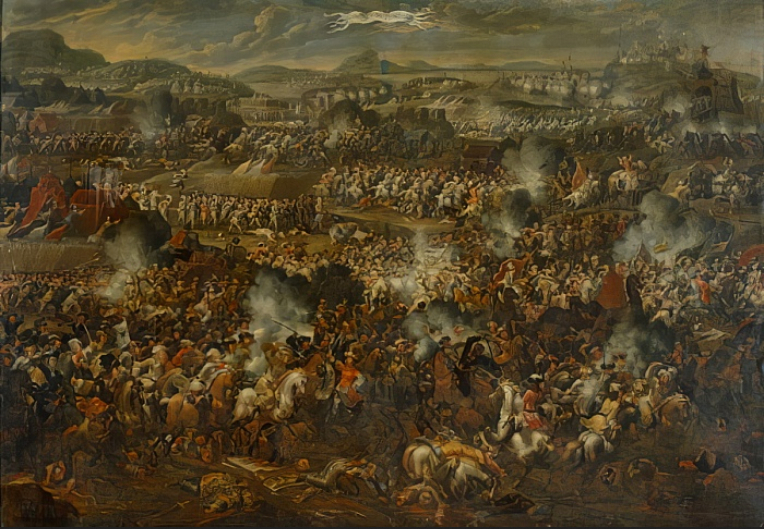
The relief of the city of Esztergom

Casteels is only known for two paintings depicting two historical battles from the Great Turkish War.

The first painting depicts the Battle of Vienna (Museum of King John III's Palace at Wilanów). As the battle took place in 1683, it must have been created after that date. The picture is one of many painted by artists all over Europe to glorify the person and heroic exploits of king Jan III Sobieski of Poland who was the commander in chief during the relief of Vienna and the victory over the Turks. Casteels depicts different phases of the fight between the anti-Turkish coalition forces and the Ottoman army led by Kara Mustafa Pasha on several planes against the backdrop of a hilly landscape. In the distance there is a panorama of Vienna. In the crowd of fighters, the figure of Jan III himself is prominent wearing a long silver-gray robe and a purple coat lined with ermine. The monarch is raising his saber while he pulls the rein of his steed with an expressive movement. The overall color of the image is maintained in olive shades with a few accents of red and pink in the costumes and white horses. Different levels of colour and light intensity are used to separate the different parts of the scene. Casteels does not seem to have been well informed about all of the details of the battle as he gets important details such as the order of the battle and the weapons and banners .

The second painting depicts The relief of the city of Esztergom (At Dorotheum Vienna auction of 4 October 2000, lot 177). The painting which is signed and dated 1686 depicts the battle against Turkish forces for the relief of Esztergom (called 'Gran' in German), now in Hungary, which took place in August 1685. The Christian troops were under the command of Charles V, Duke of Lorraine and the elector Maximilian II Emanuel, Elector of Bavaria. This picture like the first one offers a bird's eye view on several planes of the intense fighting between the Christian and Turkish forces.
