= Pieter van Mol =

Flemish painter (1599–1650)

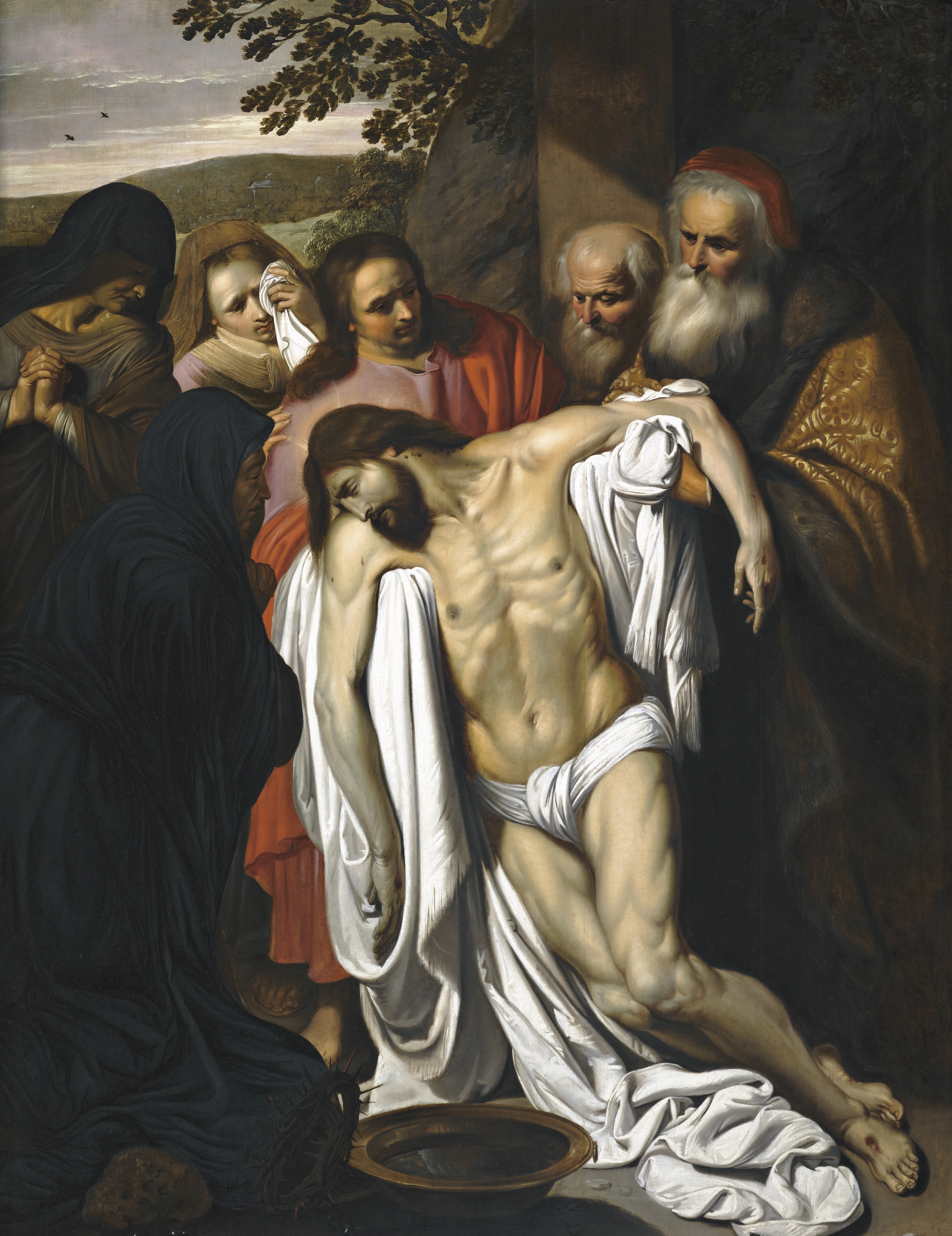
Lamentation

Pieter van Mol or Peter van Mol (17 November 1599 in Antwerp – 8 April 1650 in Paris) was a Flemish painter known for his history paintings of religious subject matter, and to a lesser extent for his allegorical compositions, genre scenes and portraits. His style was profoundly influenced by Rubens, Abraham Janssens and Artus Wolffort. He was court painter to the King and Queen of France.

== Life ==
He was an apprentice to the rather obscure painter Zeger van den Graeve in Antwerp from 1611 to 1622. He became a master in the Antwerp Guild of St. Luke in 1623. He may also have been a pupil or assistant of Artus Wolffort as his style is close to that of Wolffort. Wolffort's compositions have on occasion been attributed to van Mol.

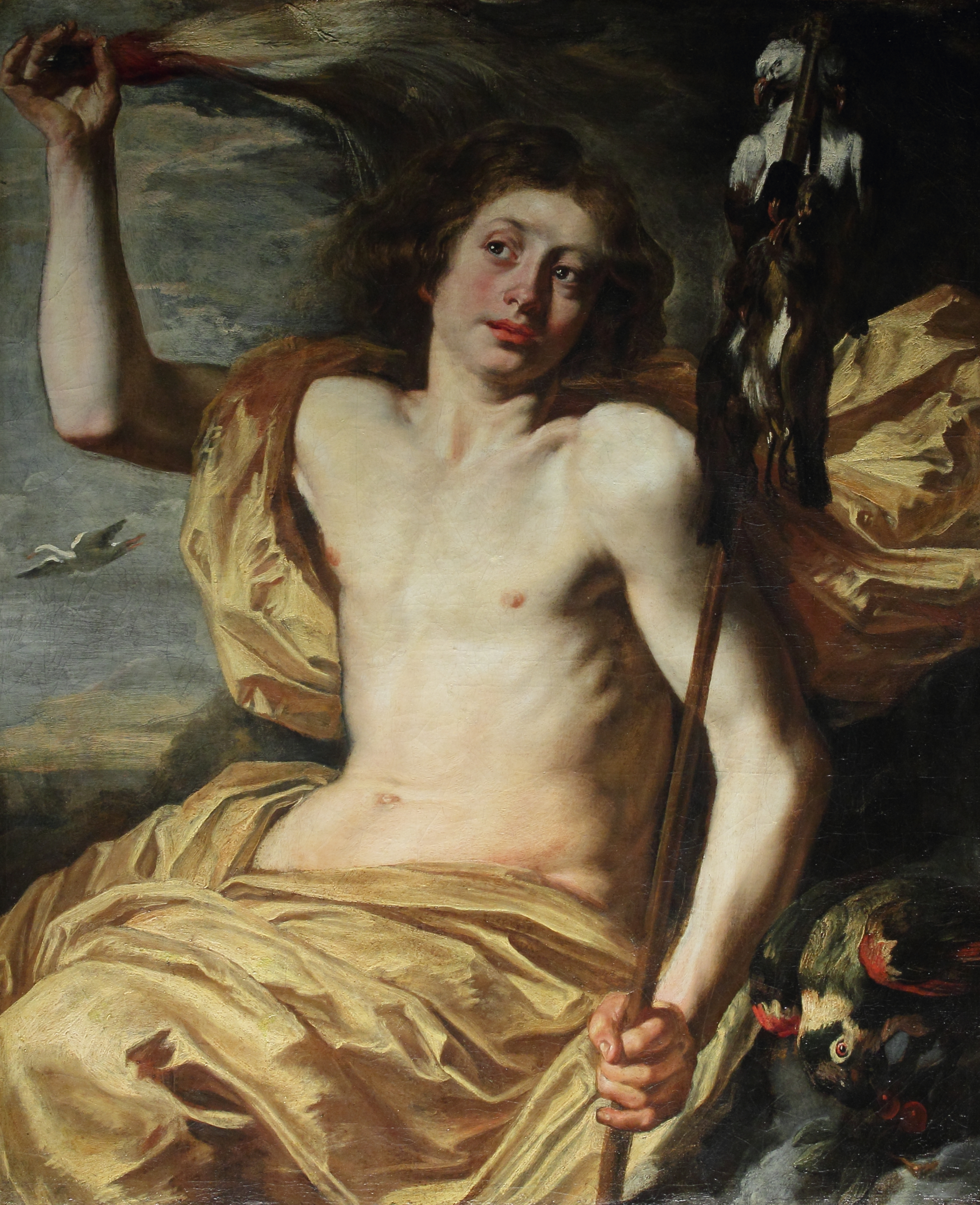
Allegory of Air

It is possible that Pieter van Mol accompanied Rubens in 1625 when he visited Paris to execute the Marie de' Medici cycle for the Galerie de Luxembourg. He set up a studio in Paris in 1631. He received several commissions from churches, such as the 1635 one for the frescoes in the chapelle du Sacré-Cœur in the Église Saint-Joseph-des-Carmes. In 1637 he became court painter to the King and he received the title of 'peintre ordinaire du roi' ('regular painter to the King'). He received commissions from the French Queen Anne of Austria and was appointed 'peintre ordinaire de la Reyne' ('regular painter to the Queen') in 1642.

On 19 February 1640 Pieter van Mol married Anne van der Burght (or Anna van der Burch) in the Church of Saint-Sulpice in Paris. The couple had eight children, of whom Robert van Mol (or Robert de Mol) became a painter and engraver. In 1643 the Flemish Confraternity in Paris commissioned from him a large altarpiece of the Adoration of the Shepherds for the abbey church of St Germain des Prés (now in the Musée des beaux-arts de Marseille), which is representative of his Parisian works.

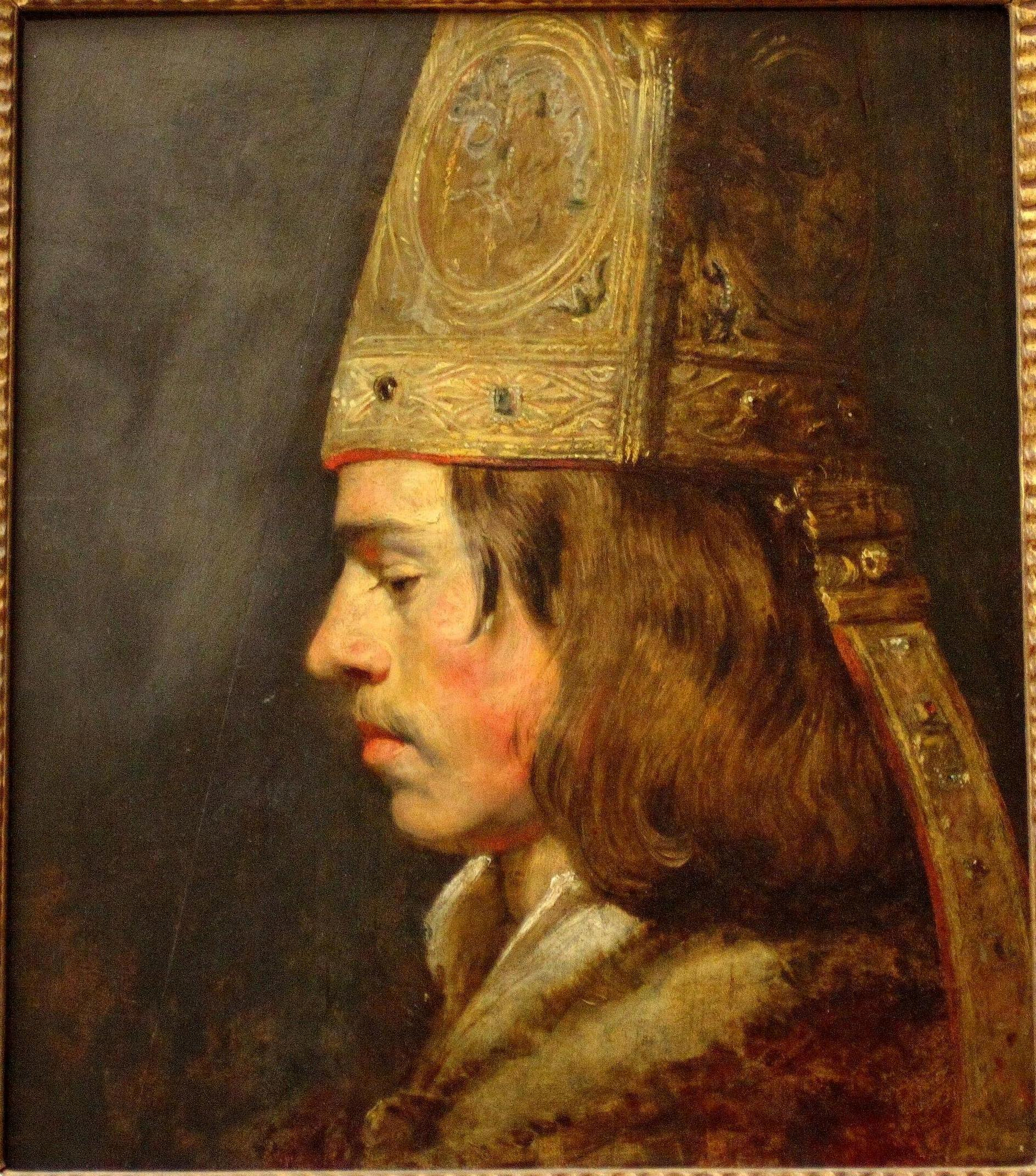
Young man with a mitre

In 1644 he is recorded residing among the circle of Flemish and Dutch artists active in Paris, which included Jacques Fouquier, Philippe Vleughels, Willem Kalf, Nicasius Bernaerts and Peter van Boucle. He worked at the court of Louis XIII.

In 1648 he was among the first artists to be invited to become a member of France's Académie royale de peinture et de sculpture after it was founded under the patronage of Cardinal Mazarin. This later became the Académie des beaux-arts.

In Paris Pieter van Mol first lived in the rue Saint Jacques and later in the rue Taranne where he died on 8 April 1650.

== Work ==
Pieter van Mol was mainly a painter of religious subject matter, and to a lesser extent, of stories from Antiquity. He also painted portraits and allegorical compositions. He further created genre scenes, but these are only known from reproductive prints and contemporary records.

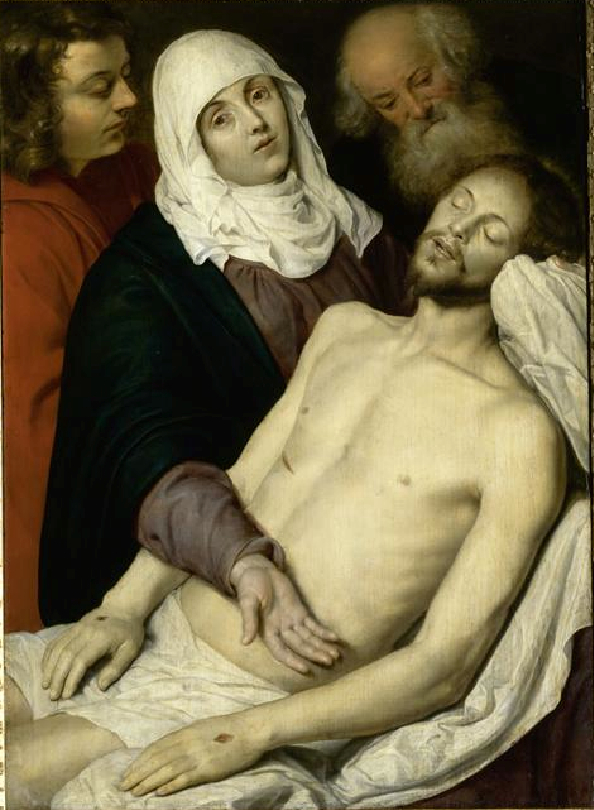
Lamentation of Christ

The style of van Mol is varied ranging from a precise and fixed execution bordering sometimes on the archaic such as in the Lamentation of Christ (Musée des beaux-arts de Valenciennes), which is almost an homage to the Flemish Primitives. Other works such as the Annunciation (Palais des Beaux-Arts de Lille) are close to the contemporary work of Philippe de Champaigne. His frescoes in the chapelle du Sacré-Cœur in the Église Saint-Joseph-des-Carmes and the Deposition in the Louvre show his debt to Rubens. The influence is clear in the typically powerful and rather short masculine physiques as well as in his clear and deep palette and the reddish shadows. The influence of Antony van Dyck is also present in his work.

Pieter van Mol was active as a portrait painter but his works in this genre are only known through engravings and some head studies.

Pieter van Mol also painted genre works, but none of these have been preserved. They are known from engravings made after them. A composition entitled Flemish dance was in the collection of the Palais Royal and was engraved by Carl Guttenberg between 1786 and 1808. It shows ruins with dancing peasants, a couple dancing at the centre, musicians and onlookers to the right and children playing on ruins in the background. One of his works depicting a nude woman was in the collection of Jean Baptiste Pierre Le Brun and an engraving of it was included in a catalog of le Brun's collection entitled 'Galerie des peintres flamands hollandais et allemands' published in 1778. Reportedly, the sale in Antwerp of prints after Pieter van Mol's work caused something of a scandal as they were considered more indecent than those of Agostino Carracci.

== Selected works ==
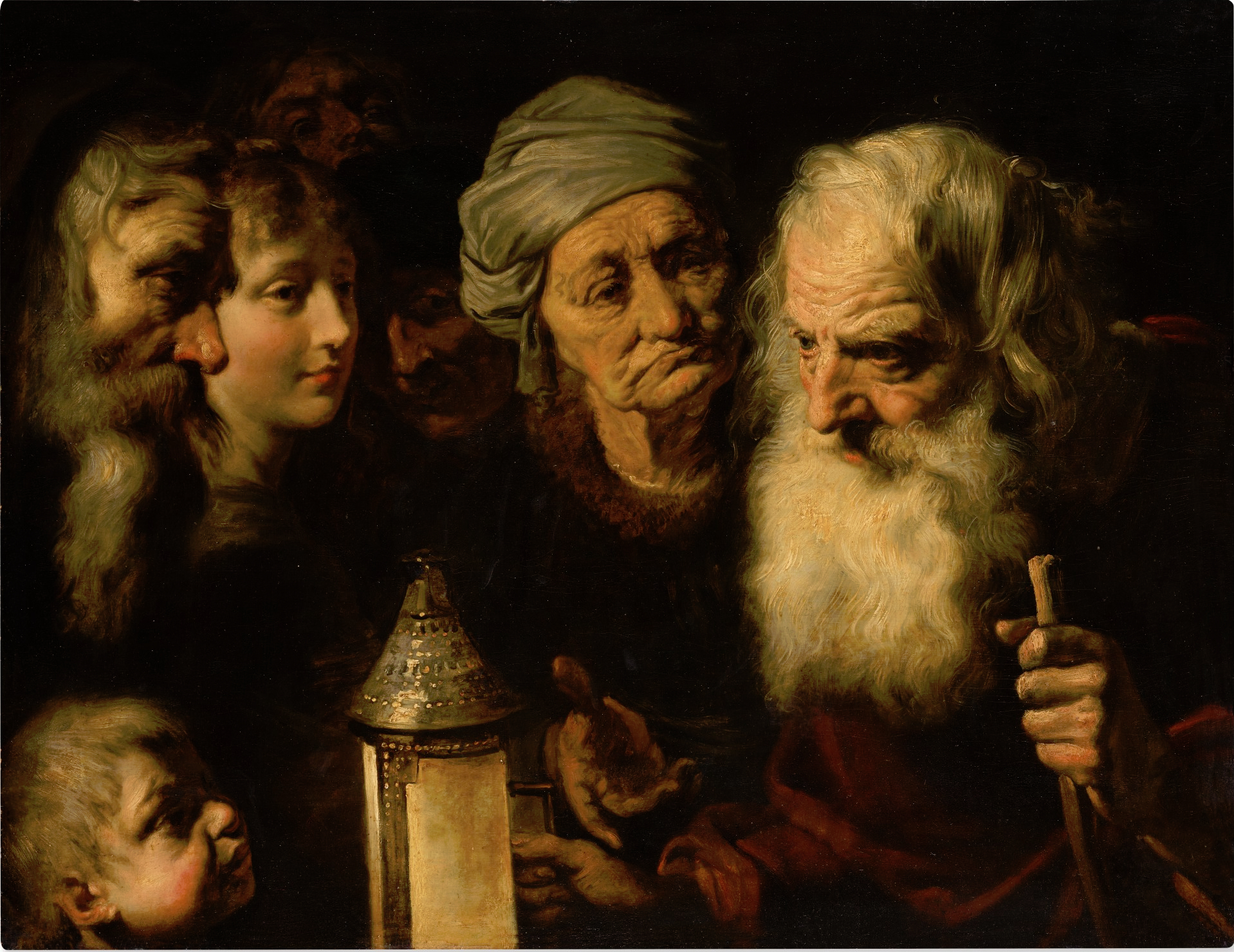
Diogenes with his lantern looking for an honest man

in Canada :

- The Deposition from the Cross, Musée des beaux-arts, Montréal.

in France :

- The Deposition from the Cross, église Notre-Dame, Calais.
- The Annunciation, Palais des beaux-arts, Lille.
- Adoration of the Shepherds, Musée des beaux-arts, Marseille.
- Young man wearing a mitre, attributed to Van Mol, Musée du Louvre, Paris.
- Christ taken down from the Cross, Musée du Louvre, Paris.
- The Deposition from the Cross, Musée des beaux-arts, Reims.

in Rumania :

- The Lady of Sorrows, 1631, Brukenthal National Museum, Sibiu.
- The Descent from the Cross, National Museum of Art of Romania, Bucharest
