= Christopher Smout =

British historian (born 1933)

Thomas Christopher Smout CBE FBA FRSE FSA Scot FRSGS (born 19 December 1933) is an English academic, historian, author and Historiographer Royal in Scotland.

== Early life ==
Christopher was born in Birmingham in 1933. One of the five sons of Arthur Smout, Christopher Smout was educated at The Leys School and Clare College, Cambridge.

== Career ==
Smout taught at the University of Edinburgh, from 1959 until 1980. At Edinburgh, he rose steadily through the academic ranks in the Department of Economic History – as an Assistant Lecturer (1959–62), as a lecturer (1962–64), and as a reader (1964–70) before being appointed as professor of economic history in 1970.

At St Andrews University from 1980 to 1991, Smout held the Chair of Scottish History. He is now professor emeritus in history at St Andrews University.

Smout was a visiting professor at the University of Strathclyde from 1991; and he has lectured in Japan, in China, in the United States, in Canada and in Australia.

Smout has written extensively on demographic history and many aspects of economic history. Since the mid-1990s, he has developed the new discipline of environmental history in Scotland, giving the Ford Lectures in Oxford in 1999, published under the title of Nature Contested, Environmental History in Scotland and Northern England since 1600. A History of the Native Woodlands of Scotland, 1500–1920, written with Alan R. MacDonald & Fiona Watson is the first modern history of Scottish woodlands. It examines the relationship between people and woodlands. His most recent publications in this field have been in woodland history and an environmental history of the Firth of Forth. His focus extends beyond the purely academic. For example, Smout has argued that conservationists should judge species based on whether or not they are pests, ignoring their origins.

Smout used his position to argue in favour of reviving the title "Princess Lyon". He suggested that the Princess Royal should be known by this title when she is in Scotland, much in the same way her nephew, the Prince of Wales and Duke of Cornwall is traditionally identified as the Duke of Rothesay, Earl of Carrick and Lord of the Isles when he is in Scotland.

Smout has also interested himself in small local issues. He is married to a Danish national, Anne-Marie, father to a daughter Penny and a son Andrew.

=== Public service commitments ===
- St Andrews Centre for Advanced Historical Studies, 1992–97, Director.
- Institute for Environmental History, 1992–2001, Director.
- Scottish Natural Heritage (SNH), 1991–97, Deputy chairman.
- National Museums of Scotland, Trustee.
- Scottish Coastal Archaeology and the Problem of Erosion Trust (SCAPE), Chairman.
- Institute of Scottish Historical Research, 2007.

=== Royal appointments ===
- Historiographer Royal of Scotland, 1993.
- Royal Commission on the Ancient and Historical Monuments of Scotland.
- Royal Commission on Historical Manuscripts, 2002–5.

== Selected works ==
- Smout, Christopher (1963), Scottish trade on the eve of union, 1660–1707.
- ——— (1969), A History of the Scottish People 1560–1830.
- Smout, Christopher; Flinn, Michael, eds. (1974), Essays in social history.
- ——— (1977), Comparative aspects of Scottish and Irish economic and social history, 1600–1900.
- Smout, Christopher; Flinn, Michael, eds. (1979), The Search for wealth and stability: essays in economic and social history.
- ——— (1979), The state of the Scottish working-class in 1843: a statistical and spatial enquiry based on the data from the Poor Law Commission Report of 1844.
- ——— (1986), A Century of the Scottish People 1830–1950.
- ——— (1986), Scotland and Europe 1200–1850.
- Smout, Christopher; Wood, Sydney, eds. (1990), Scottish Voices 1745–1960.
- Smout, Christopher, ed. (1992), Scotland and the Sea.
- Smout, Christopher, ed. (1993), Scotland Since Prehistory – Natural Change and Human Impact.
- Smout, Christopher; Foster, S, eds. (1994), The History of Soils and Field Systems.
- ———, Prices, food, and wages in Scotland, 1550–1780, 1995.
- ——— (1997), Scottish Woodland History.
- Smout, Christopher; Lambert, RA, eds. (1999), Rothiemurchus: Nature and People on a Highland Estate 1500–2000.
- ———, Nature contested: environmental history in Scotland and Northern England since 1600, 2000.
- Smout, Christopher; Menzies, Gordon, eds. (2001), In search of Scotland.
- ——— (2003), People and woods in Scotland: a history.
- ——— (2012), The Firth of Forth, An Environmental History.

Smout TC, MacDonald Alan R & Watson Fiona. A History of the Native Woodlands of Scotland, 1500 - 1920. Edinburgh 2005

== Honours ==
- Order of the British Empire, Commander, 1994.
- University of St Andrews, honorary doctorate, 1999.
- University of Edinburgh, honorary doctorate, 1996.
- University of Glasgow, honorary doctorate, 2001.
- University of Stirling, honorary doctorate, 2002.
- British Academy, fellow.
- Royal Society of Edinburgh, fellow.
- Society of Antiquaries of Scotland, fellow
