= Lucas Smout the Younger =

Flemish painter (1671–1713)

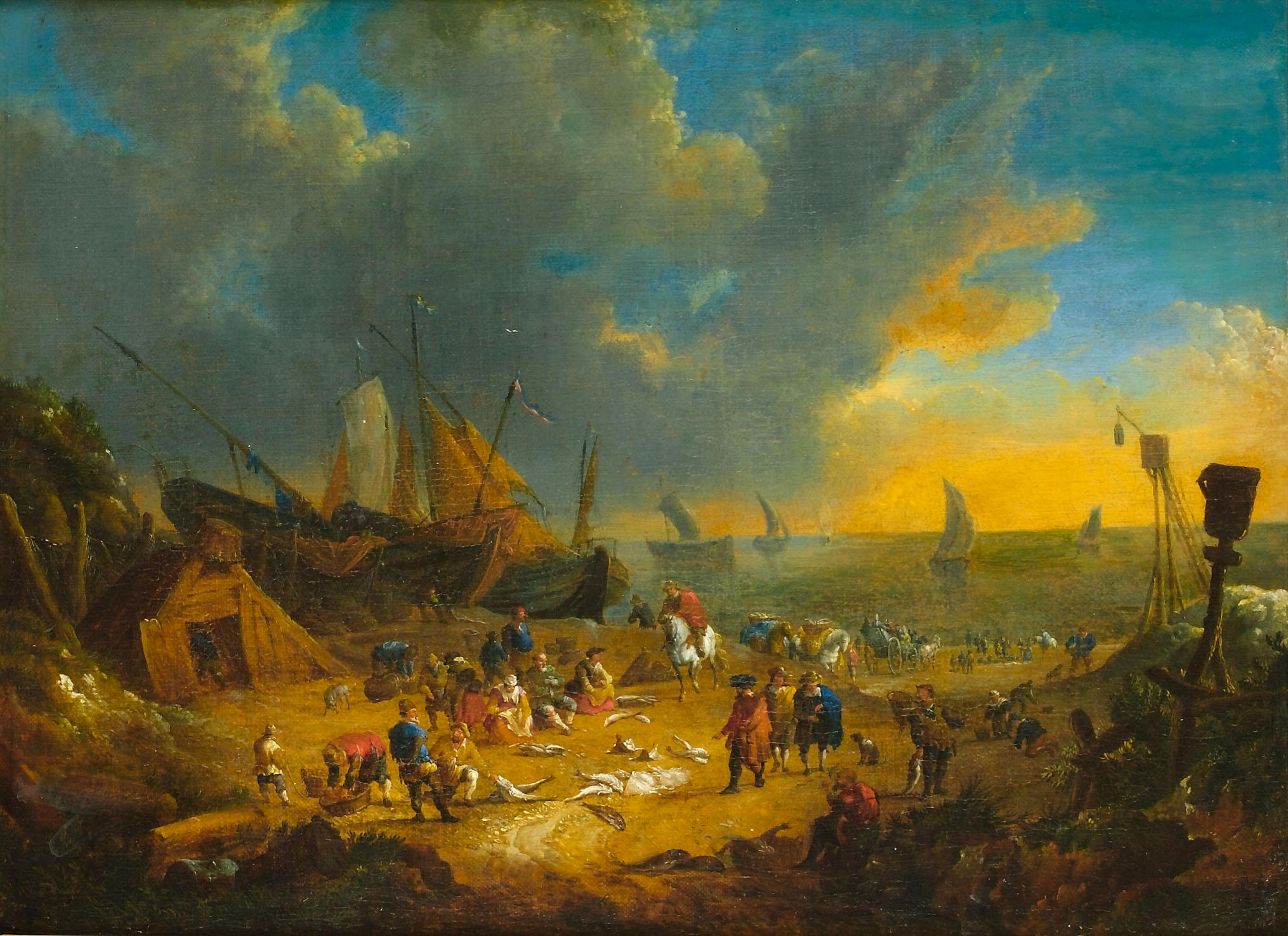
Elegant figures inspecting the catch on a beach

Lucas Smout the Younger or Lucas Smaut (27 February 1671 – 8 April 1713) was a Flemish painter of coastal and country scenes who was active in Antwerp. His landscapes are typically crowded with many people engaged in various activities.

== Life ==
Details about the life of Lucas Smout are scarce. He was born in Antwerp as the youngest child of the painter and art dealer Lucas Smout the Elder and Anna Maria Tijssens. His father had studied under Artus Wolffort and was a figure painter. His brother Dominicus (or Domien) became a genre painter while two of his sisters married painters. His mother was a member of the prominent Tijssens or Tyssens family of artists in Antwerp, which included artists such as Jan Baptist Tijssens the Younger. His father died in 1674 and his mother in 1686. His sister Clara Catharina continued to operate the art and painting materials business of her parents. Upon discovering Lucas' artistic talent, she sent him to study art under a master.

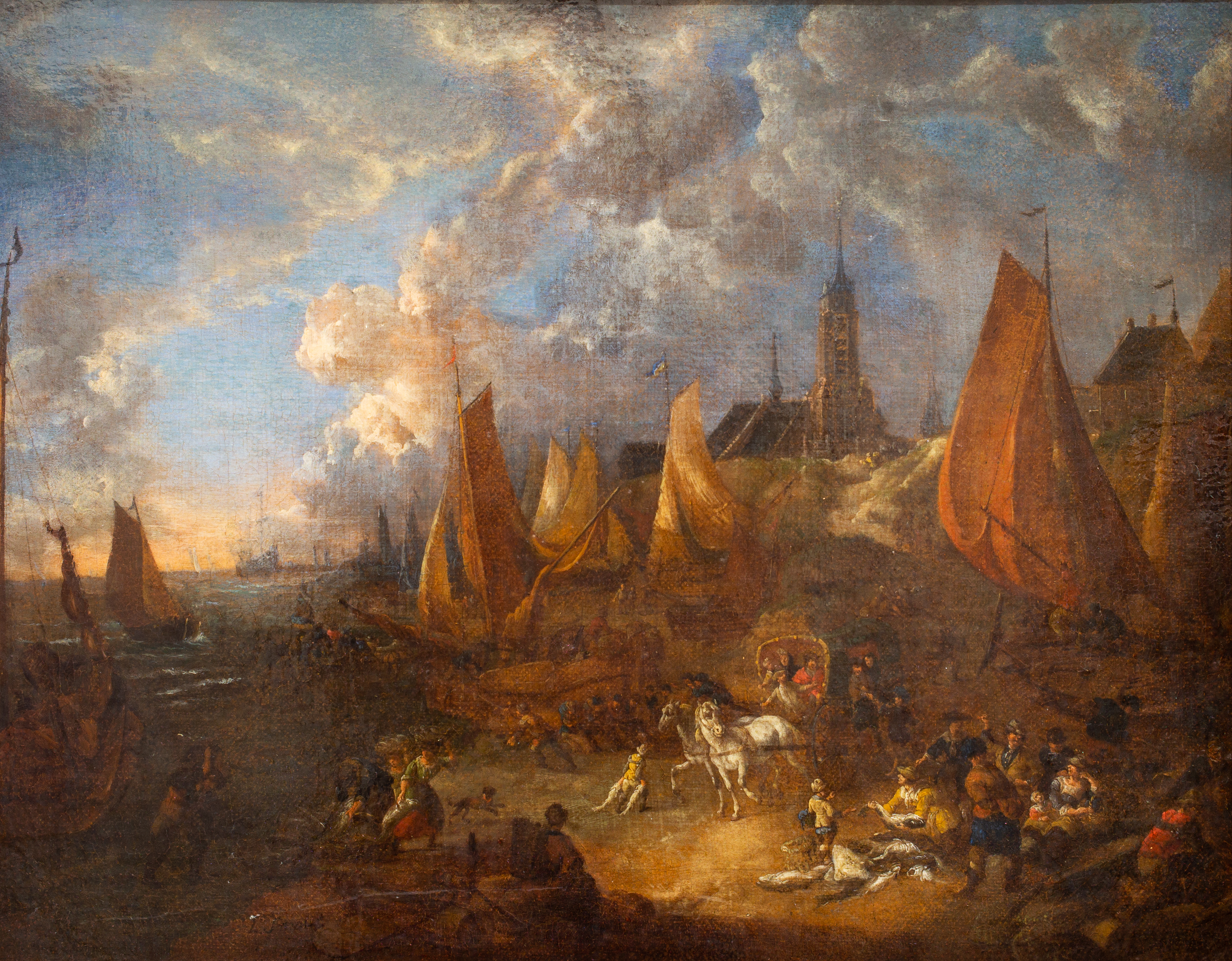
Coastal Landscape With Travellers and Fishermen Selling Their Catch

Lucas was registered in 1685–86 in the registers of the Antwerp Guild of Saint Luke as a pupil of the marine artist Hendrik van Minderhout.

Smout was active in Antwerp throughout his career but must have visited the Dutch Republic since he painted a few views of Scheveningen beach. Smout was not very productive as he suffered from gout, which affected his hands. This may also be the reason why he remained unmarried and lived in the house of his eldest sister Clara Catharina who was married to the painter Gonzales Franciscus Casteels. Another sister married the painter Jacob Herreyns the Elder.

He died in Antwerp in 1713.

== Work ==
Like his master Hendrik van Minderhout, Lucas Smout specialized mainly in marine views, which the populated with many ships and figures.

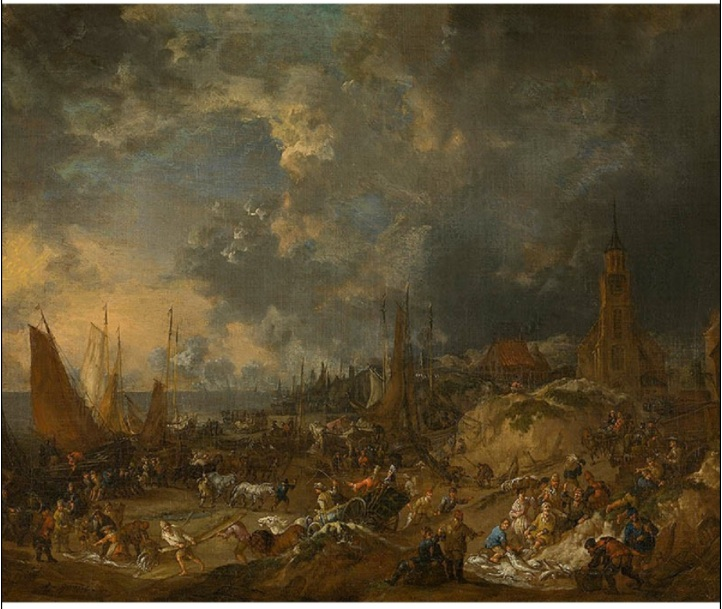
The Beach of Scheveningen

Only a few works by his hand are known. He painted a number of coastal scenes depicting various activities relating to the return of fishing boats with their catch or the loading of vessels. They include a view of The Beach of Scheveningen (Royal Museum of Fine Arts Antwerp). This work is typical of Smout's busy compositions: it includes many groups of people and a wide range of activities taking place on the beach, such as pulling fishing boats onto the land, men hauling wood, soldiers transporting two gun barrels, fishmongers and on the far right - next to a cannon - a man drawing, which is likely a self-portrait.

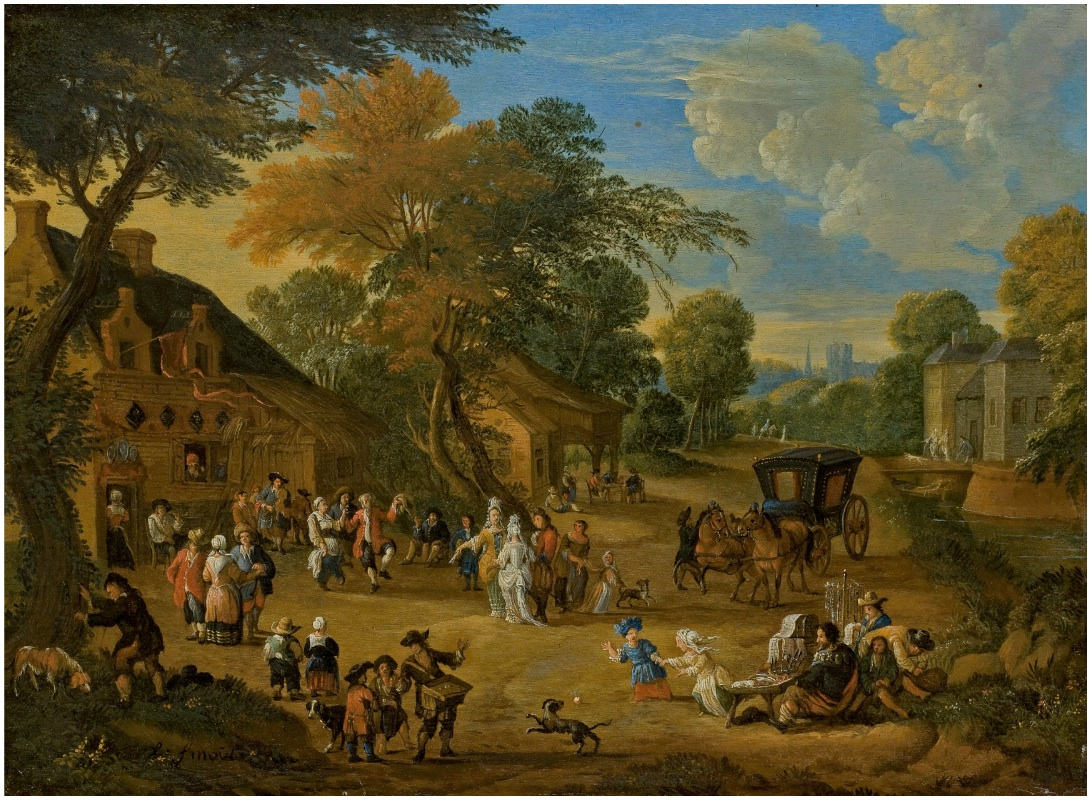
Village square

Smout collaborated on a beach view with Pieter Bout who painted the staffage. This work referred to as Harbour and Fish Market (Musée des beaux-arts de Quimper) possibly also represents a view of the beach and port of Scheveningen as in its composition and figures it closely resembles Pieter Bout's Selling Fish at the Beach of Scheveningen (Van Ham Auctions, 11 May 2012, Lot 518).

Smout painted some village scenes with feasts such as the Village square (Christie's, 19 March 2010, Paris, lot 75) or a cavalry engagement such as A cavalry skirmish in a village (Christie's, 23 May 2000, New York, lot 279).
