= Jan Baptist Wolfaerts =

Flemish painter

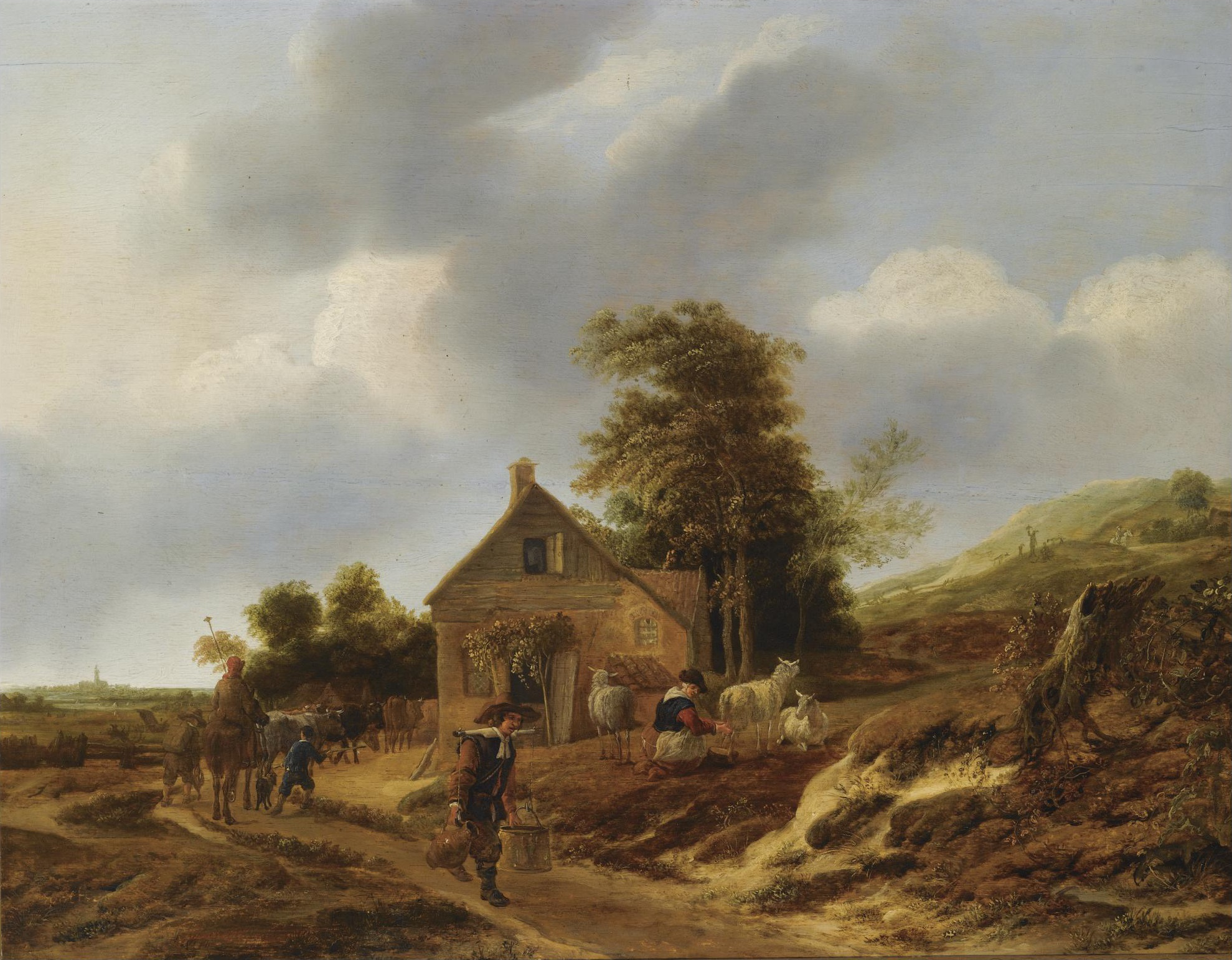
Dune landscape with a peasant woman milking sheep outside a farmhouse

Jan Baptist Wolfaerts (Antwerp, baptized on 15 November 1625 – Antwerp (?), between 1671 and 1687) was a Flemish painter known for his pastoral landscape with shepherds and cattle and Italianate landscapes. He trained in Antwerp and subsequently worked for extensive periods in Italy and the Dutch Republic.

== Life ==
Wolfaerts was born in Antwerp as the son of Artus Wolfaerts, a prominent painter of religious and mythological scenes. His father was likely his first teacher. When Jan Baptist was 16 years old, his father died. it is believed he then traveled to Rome via Paris. There is no evidence for this trip but the italianate aspects in some of his early works from between 1644 and 1646 make such a trip likely.

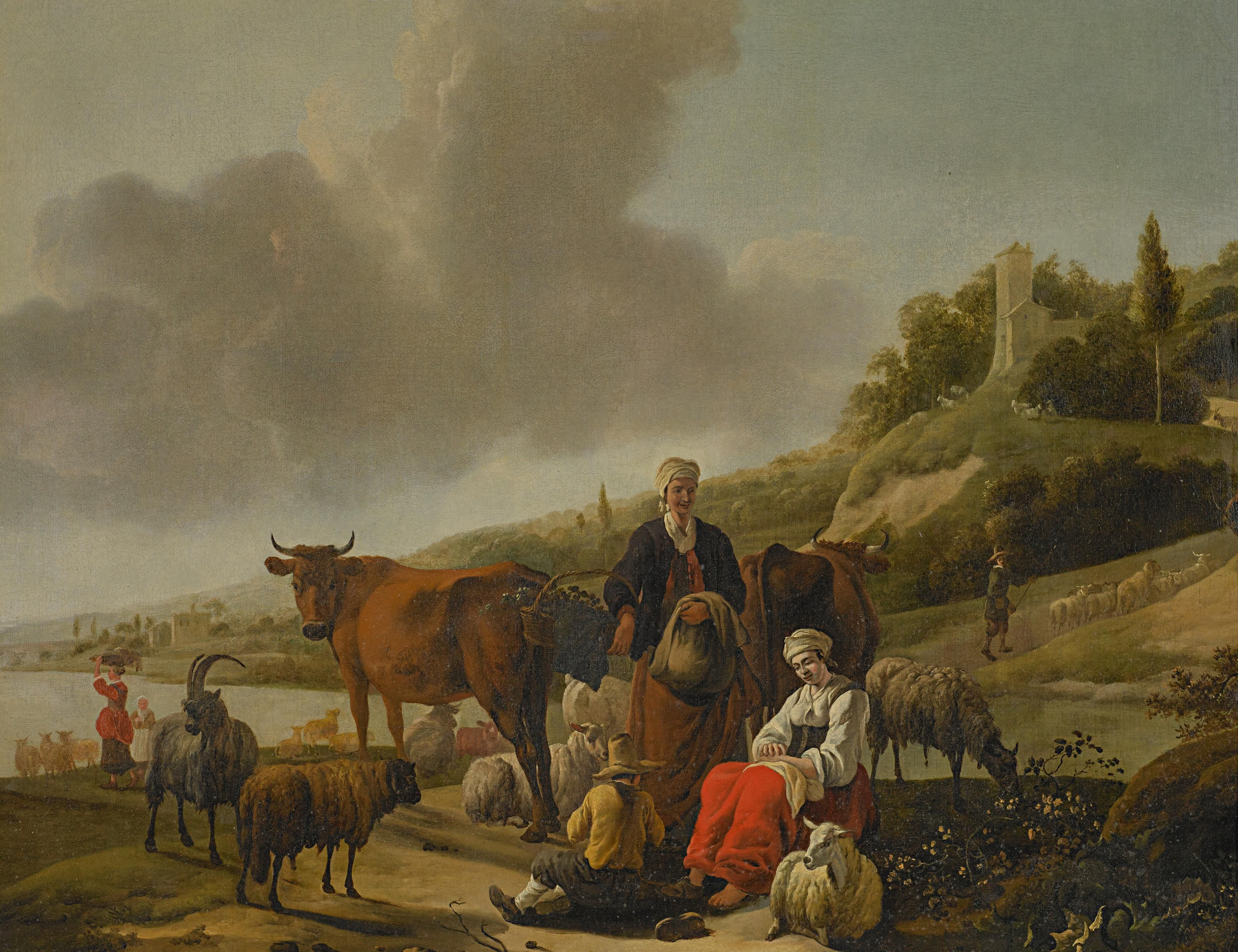
Shepherds with their cattle in a hilly river landscape

In 1647 he was recorded in Haarlem where he joined the local Guild of Saint Luke. A decade later the artist was in Rome as evidenced by a document of 1658 referring to him as Giovanbattista Ulfard, fiamengo. The next year he was back in Haarlem where he remained until 1671. He bought on 11 January 1659 a house at the Koningstraat in Haarlem. In July 1661 he had a son out of wedlock. There are reports that in the mid-60's his mental health deteriorated and he went back to his family in Antwerp. By 1665 he had returned to Haarlem, but his mental health problem made him move back to Antwerp once more. In September 1671 there are further reports on the artist who was back in Haarlem about his continuing confused state of mind.

That his work was highly regarded in his time is borne out by its presence in contemporary Dutch inventories. His works were sold through the Amsterdam dealer Van Meldert who carried five examples in 1653 and were in the collection of artist and art collector Abraham de Pape of Leiden.

It is not clear when or where he died but it may have been in Antwerp.

== Work ==
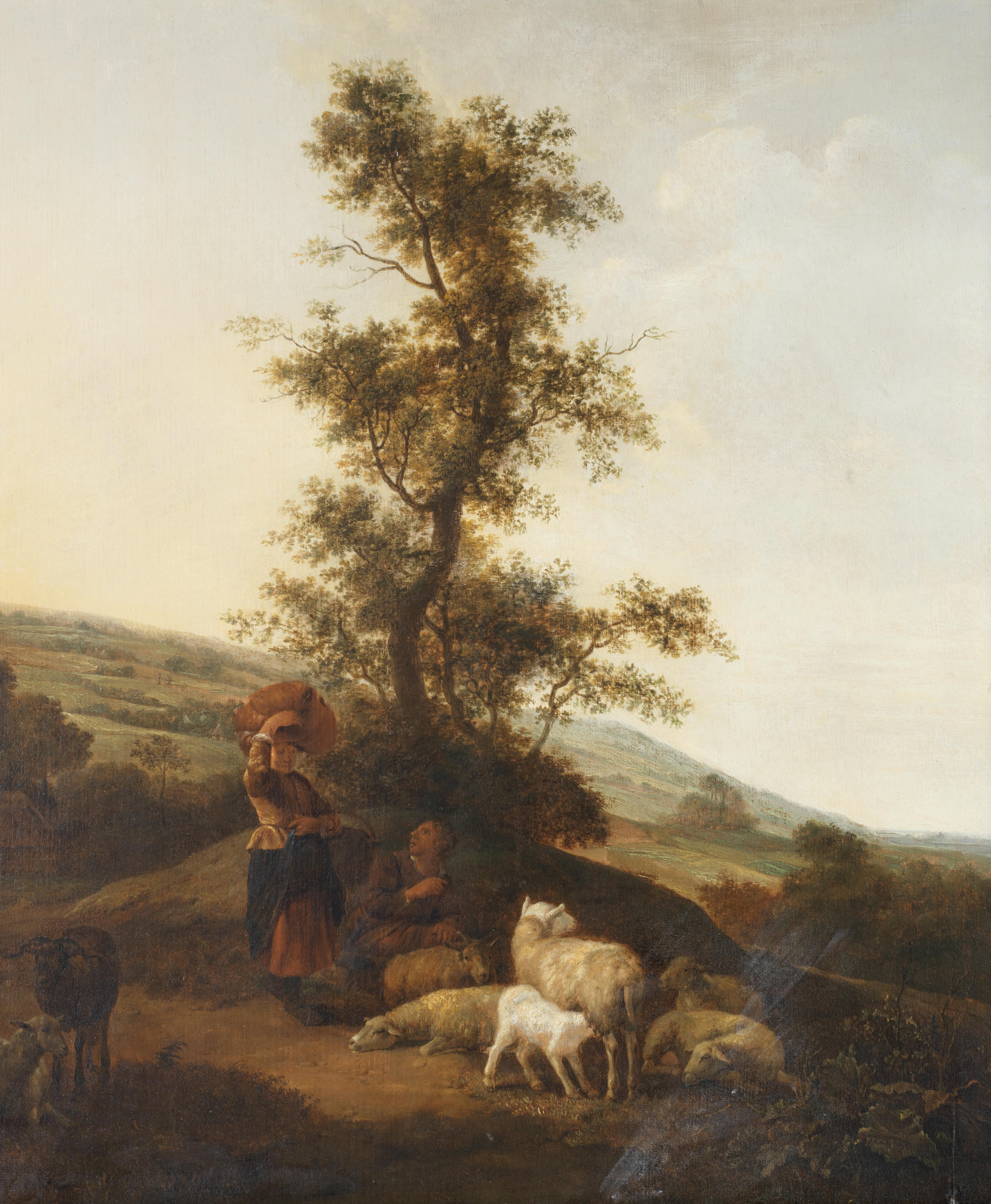
Shepherdesses tending their flock

Jan Baptist Wolfaerts was a specialist landscape painter who is known for his Italianate landscapes with figures. His early works included italianate townscapes. His principal subject was pastoral landscapes with shepherds and their herds. Such landscapes would on occasion include depictions of Italianate buildings. He also painted some more typically Dutch landscapes with fewer figures, which are closer to his Haarlem contemporaries. Haarlem painters Nicolaes Berchem and Salomon Rombouts were clearly influential on the artist. This is evident in his Italianate pastoral scenes, some of which have previously been attributed to Berchem.
