= Michael Flinn =

British economic historian

Michael Walter Flinn (22 October 1917 – 28 September 1983) was a British economic historian. Born into a middle-class family in Chorlton-on-Medlock, he was educated at William Hulme's Grammar School in Manchester, serving as an officer in the Royal Artillery during the Second World War. After the end of the war, Flinn took a history degree at the University of Manchester before spending two years as a grammar school teacher while writing a postgraduate dissertation in his spare time. In 1959, he began lecturing at the University of Edinburgh, writing an introductory school textbook for history in 1961, which was still in print at his death. He was awarded a D. Litt by Edinburgh in 1965, and two years later was appointed to a Personal Chair in Social History. After his retirement in 1978, he lectured in the United States and continental Europe, serving as president of the Economic History Society from 1980 to 1983, when he died in Stroud, Gloucestershire.

Flinn established a remarkable academic reputation in less than 20 years as a university teacher, for he was already in his forties when appointed to a full-time teaching post at Edinburgh.

His magnum opus, The History of the British Coal Industry. Volume II. 1700-1830: The Industrial Revolution (Oxford: 1984), written with his research assistant David S. Stoker, was commissioned as part of the National Coal Board's five volume history of the industry from the middle ages to the present time. It was glowingly reviewed. John Benson said "Flinn's history is based on a prodigious amount of archival research in libraries and record offices across the British Isles [yet] this great mass of material never threatens to become overpowering".

For M.J. Daunton, "[it] will surely be the definitive account for the next fifty years. * * * It is the mature work of an outstanding scholar who combined careful research, a lucid style, and a deep historical understanding.

John Harris had a personal appreciation:

For many of us, and particularly those who knew him over many years, the book's arrival is clouded by Michael Flinn's death shortly before it appeared. We have lost not only the author of weighty contributions to industrial, social, and population history but also a man whose excellence as a teacher led to valuable works for students and whose administrative ability was devoted to his presidency of the Economic History Society; a man of great kindness, geniality and wit.

For William J. Hausman, Flinn's book "will be the standard history of the coal industry of that period for a long time", while Arthur J. Taylor said the book was "a Beethoven symphony in its scale and proportions... [Flinn] was a scholar of many interests, all pursued to the point of excellence."

== Bibliography ==
- Saul, S.B. (1984). "Obituary: Professor Michael W. Flinn 1917-1983". Economic History Review. 37 (1). Economic History Society. ISSN 0013-0117.
