= Arthur Smout =

Director-General of Ammunition Production at the British Ministry of Supply

Sir Arthur Smout
- Born: 18 November 1888; Birmingham, England
- Died: 21 February 1961 (age 72)
- Education: King Edward's School; Birmingham Municipal Technical School
- Occupation: Businessman
- Spouse: Annie Hilda Follows
- Children: 5, including Christopher Smout

Sir Arthur Smout (18 November 1888 – 21 February 1961) was first Director-General of Small Arms Production for the British Armed Forces during World War II and later became Director-General of Ammunition Production at the Ministry of Supply. Before the war Smout was managing director of Imperial Chemical Industries metals group and later served on the company's board of directors until 1953.

== Early life ==
Arthur John Griffiths Smout was born in Birmingham, England on 18 November 1888, the eldest of three brothers. He was educated at King Edward's School in Birmingham, and Birmingham Municipal Technical School. Smout started his career in 1905 as a student apprentice at Elliott’s Metal Co in Birmingham, while also studying part-time at Birmingham University and gaining the full technological certificate of the City and Guilds of London Institute in 1909. He worked in various analytical chemistry and metallurgy positions at Elliot’s and by 1920 he had become works manager of the various Elliot’s factories.

== Business career ==
From 1924 to 1934 Smout was production director of Elliott’s Metal Co, which became part of Imperial Chemical Industries in 1928. He was appointed joint managing director of Imperial Chemical Industries metals group and then from 1936, chairman of I.C.I. Metals, Ltd which had factories in Birmingham, Wolverhampton, Leeds, Manchester and Swansea. In 1944 he was appointed to the ICI main board and remained as a Director until 1953. During his time with the company Smout was responsible for their ammunition and metal production. After retiring from Imperial Chemical Industries in 1953 Smout was appointed chairman of Murex Ltd., and Murex Welding Processes, Ltd.

== Military service ==
During World War I Smout’s application to join active service was refused and he was transferred to the army reserve, as his work with Elliot’s was regarded as war work. According to his brother, Arthur invented a metallic amalgam which was used in shells which shot down the first Zeppelin over London. Shortly after the outbreak of World War II, Smout hosted a visit by King George VI to the ammunition production at the Imperial Chemical Industries site in Witton on 26 October 1939. Smout was appointed first Director-General of Small Arms Production for the British Armed Forces and then (in 1944) Director-General of Ammunition Production at the Ministry of Supply. He received his knighthood for his war time service in 1946 from King George VI.

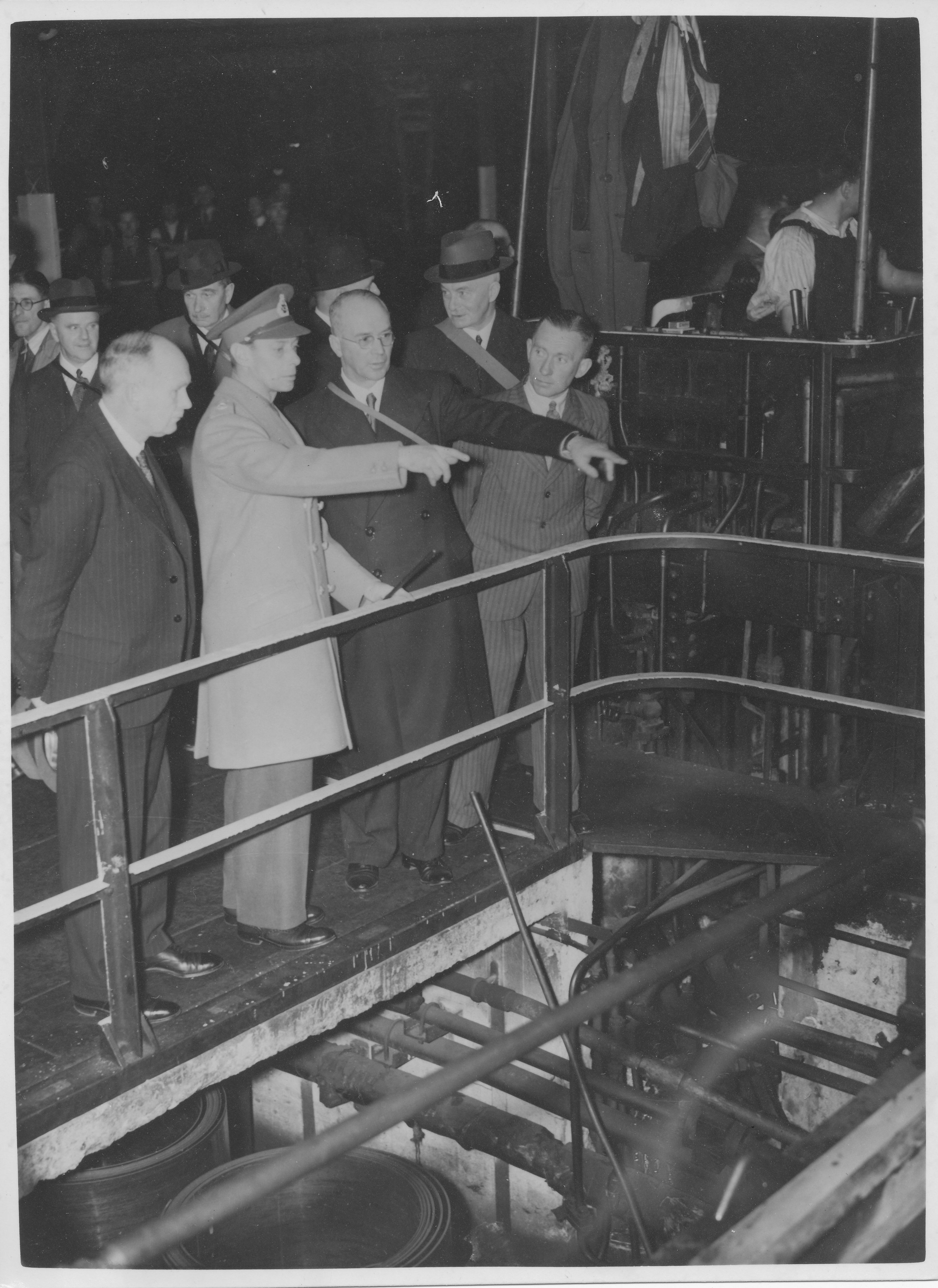
Sir Arthur Smout (pointing, black coat) and King George VI (pointing, grey coat) during the King's visit to the I.C.I Witton factory on 26 October 1939

== Post-War career ==
In 1948, Smout bought the 330 acre Sherriffs Lench Farm in Worcestershire and farmed it (initially with his son Michael as manager) until his death in hospital in Birmingham on 21 February 1961, aged 72. His farm diaries and memoranda books for the period 1948 to 1961 are held in the Worcester county archives.

== Personal life ==
Smout was married to Annie Hilda Follows and they had five sons. His youngest son, Christopher Smout, is a historian, and the current incumbent of the post of Historiographer Royal. Another son, His Honour David Smout, QC, was an Official Referee.

Arthur gave much of his time to the advancement of science and to public service, particularly in his native city of Birmingham, where he was President of the Birmingham branch of the British Chamber of Commerce, a Life Governor and member of the Council of Birmingham University and a Justice of the Peace serving as a City Magistrate at 500 sittings from 1942 to 1961. He was also president of the Institute of Metals, a fellow of the Royal Institute of Chemistry, a fellow of the Institution of Metallurgists, and vice-president of the Institution of Mining and Metallurgy. He was awarded an honorary doctorate from the University of Wales in 1954, in recognition of the work he had done for industry in the Swansea area and his contribution to technological education.

== Coat of arms ==
After his knighthood Arthur was awarded a coat of arms from the College of Arms. The Latin motto, "Non Sibi Sed Toti", means "Not For Self But For All". The five stars represent Arthur's five sons and the two pears represent Arthur and his wife.

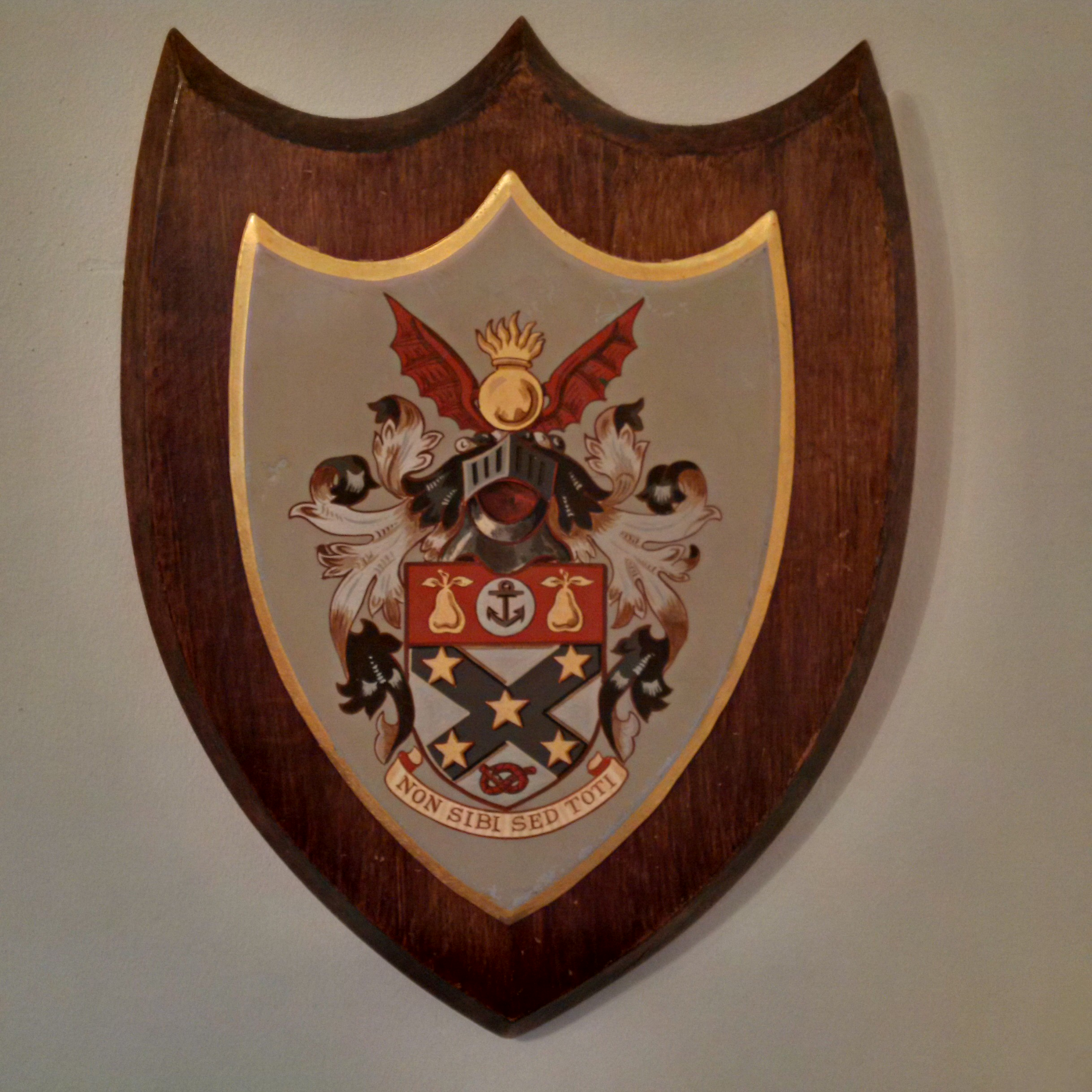
Sir Arthur Smout coat of arms
