= Artus Wolffort =

Flemish painter

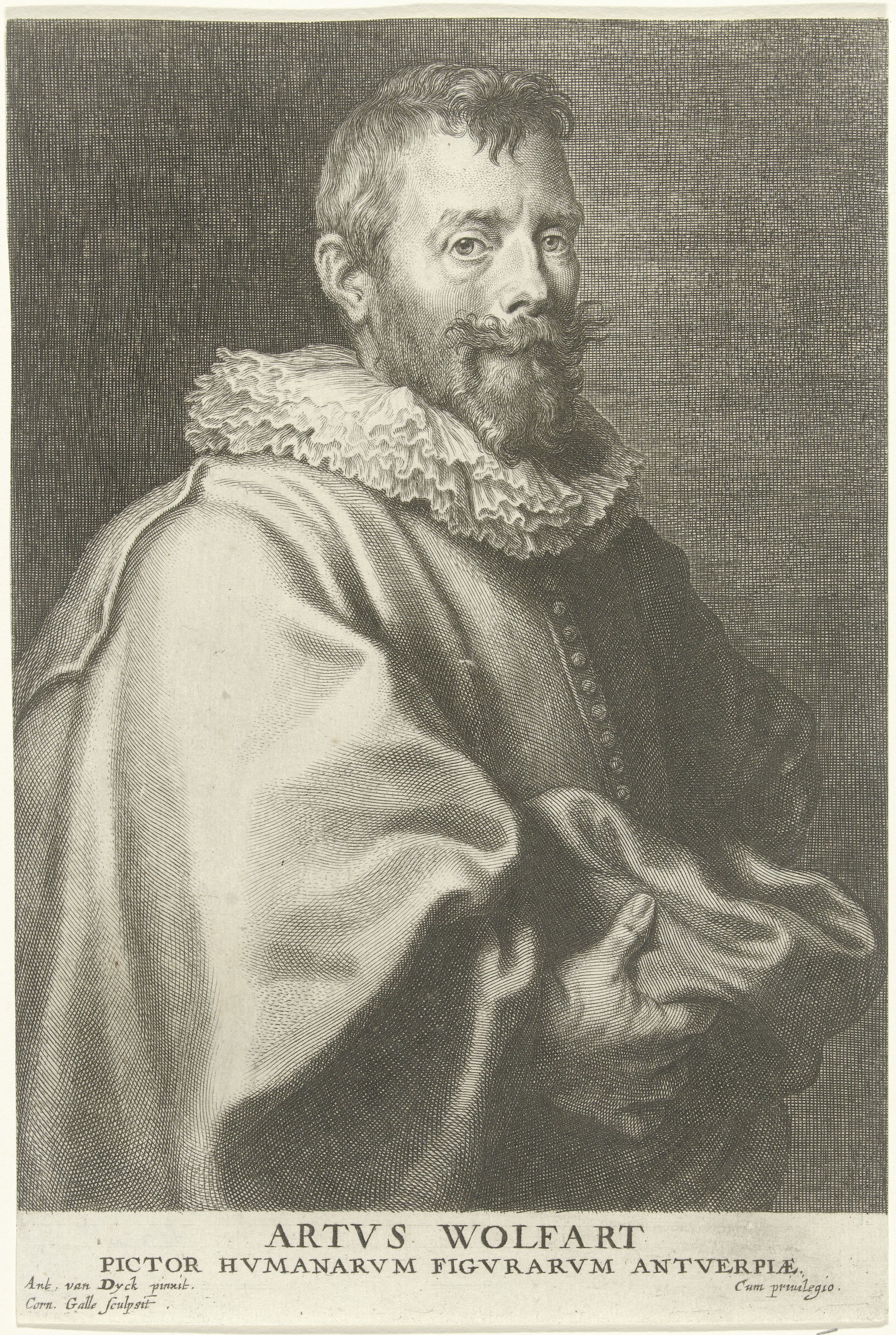
- Artus Wolffort, by Cornelis Galle the Elder after Anthony van Dyck
- Born: 1581, Antwerp
- Died: 1641, Antwerp

Artus Wolffort, Artus Wolffaert or Artus Wolffaerts (1581–1641) was a Flemish painter known mainly for his history paintings depicting religious and mythological scenes.

== Life ==
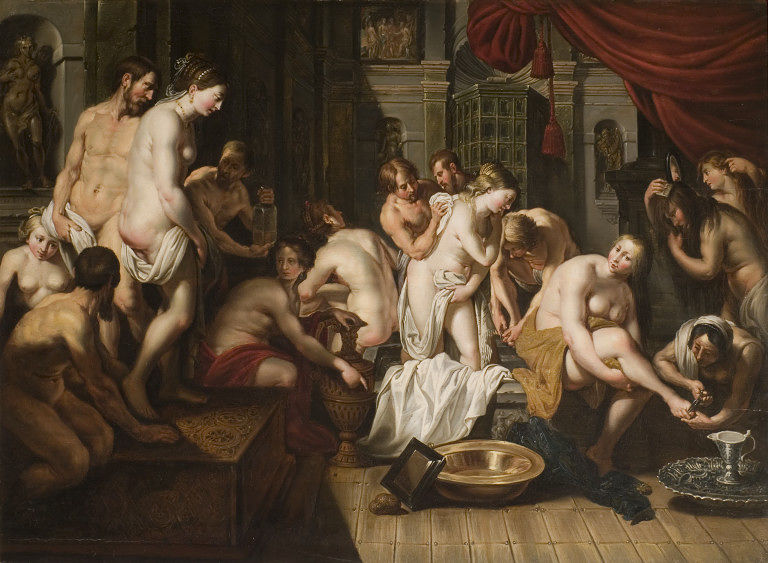
Esther's Toilet in the Harem of Ahasuerus

Artus Wolffort was born in Antwerp and moved with his parents to Dordrecht in the year of his birth. He trained as a painter in Dordrecht where he joined the local Guild of Saint Luke in 1603. He returned to Antwerp around 1615 where he worked as an assistant in the studio of Otto van Veen, one of the teachers of Peter Paul Rubens. During this period he lived in the house of van Veen. He became a member of the Antwerp Guild of Saint Luke in 1617.

He married Maria Wandelaer on 8 September 1619. Their son Johannes Artusz (better known as Jan Baptist Wolfaerts) was born in November 1625 and later became a painter. Artus Wolffort likely operated a workshop in Antwerp, which produced various copies of his works. His pupils Pieter van Lint and Pieter van Mol worked for a while as copyists in his workshop.

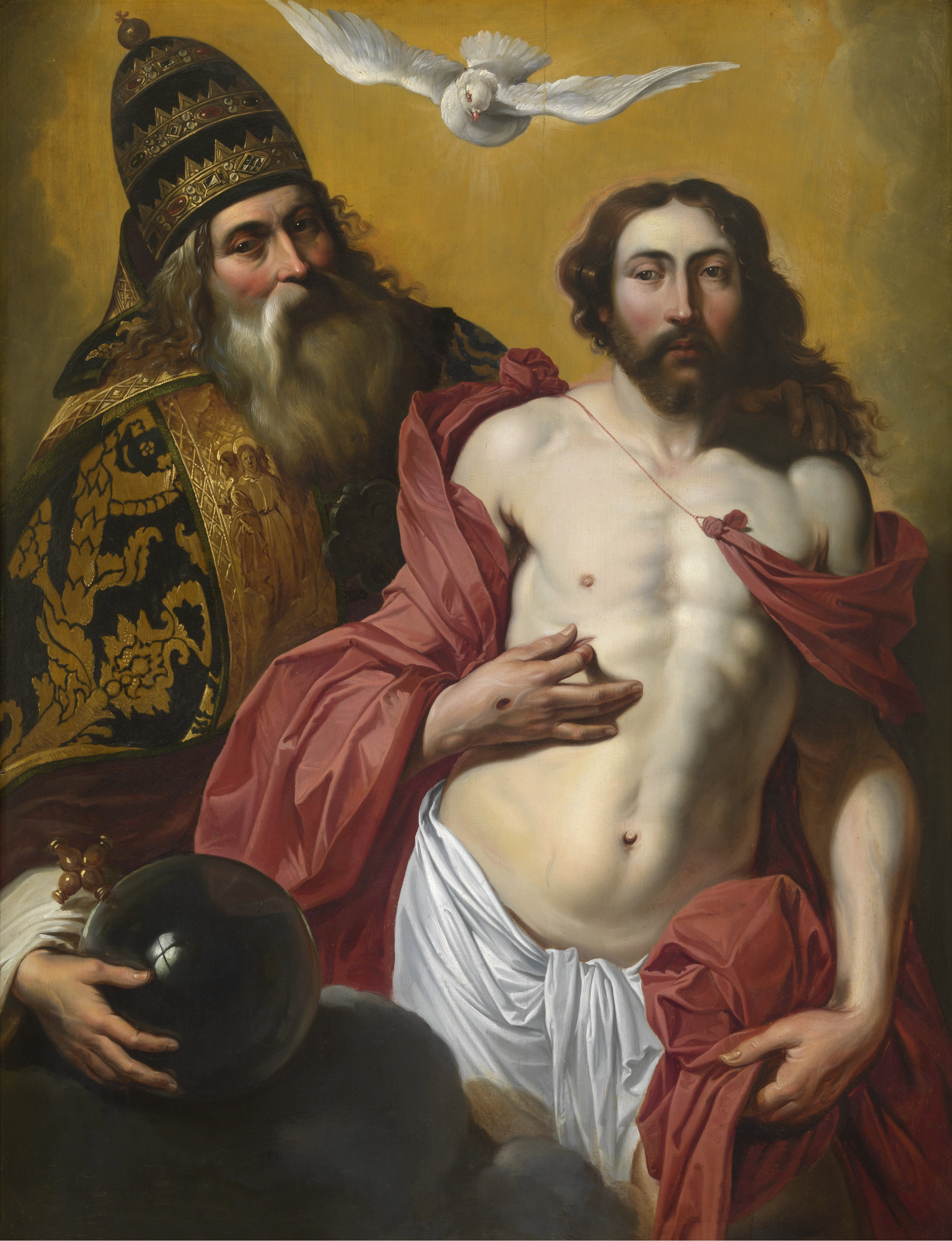
The Holy Trinity

Artus Wolffort was one of the artists who worked on the decorations for the Joyous Entry into Antwerp of the new governor of the Habsburg Netherlands Cardinal-Infante Ferdinand in 1635. Rubens was in overall charge of this project for which Wolffort made decorative paintings after designs by Rubens.

His pupils included his son Jan Baptist Wolfaerts, Pieter van Lint, Pieter van Mol and Lucas Smout the Elder. He died in Antwerp.

== Work ==
Wolffort and his work were not well known until the late 1970s and some of his paintings were even classified as early works by Rubens. His oeuvre was reconstructed from a fully signed work (Esther's Toilet in the Harem of Ahasuerus, original untraced, 10 copies of which one fully signed in the Victoria and Albert Museum in London) and various paintings bearing a monogram.

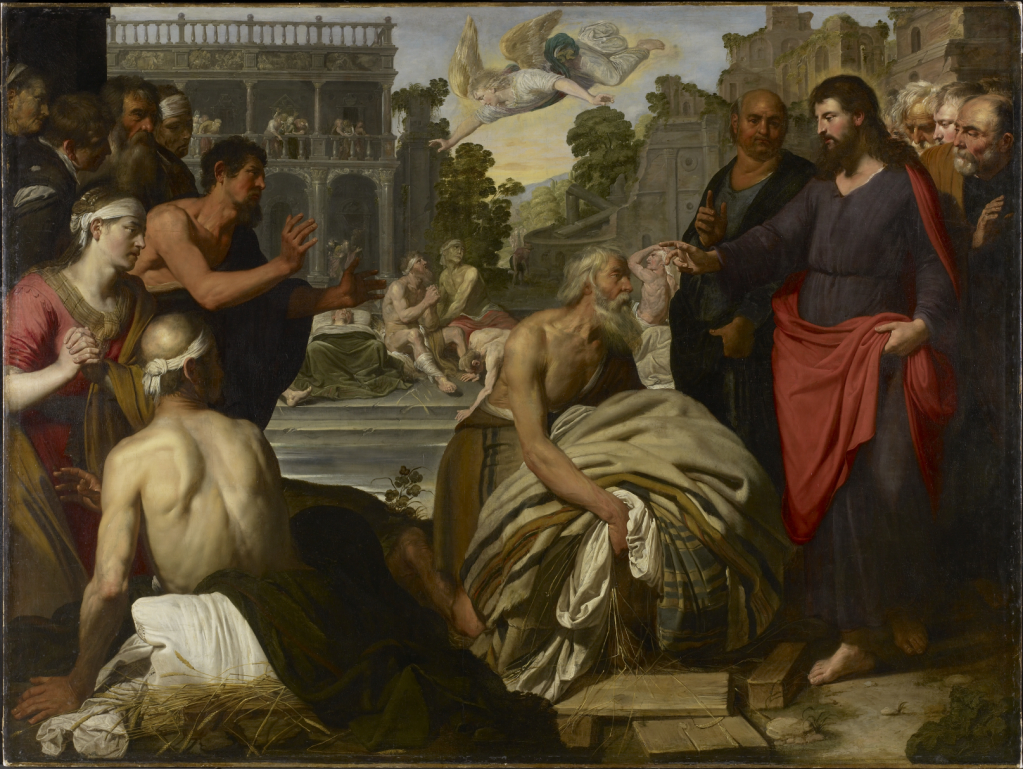
Christ at the Pool of Bethesda

In the beginning of his career Wolffort completed a number of commissioned altarpieces for churches in Antwerp such as the Ascension of the Virgin and the Assumption of the Virgin (St. Paul's Church, Antwerp, 1617). He worked, however, mainly for private patrons for whom he painted mainly religious and, to a lesser extent, mythological subjects. Many of his works consist of life-size figures depicting scenes from the life of Christ. He made a series of representations of the Twelve Apostles, the Four Evangelists and the Church Fathers, in half life-size. If the attribution to Wolffort is correct, a genre painting called The scullery maid (probably 1633, M - Museum Leuven) shows that Wolffort also created genre scenes for the market.

His early works were in the classizing style of Otto van Veen. Wolffort regularly used themes and motifs of van Veen in these early works, which were executed in a proto-Baroque style. This is obvious in the work Christ in the house of Simon the Pharisee (one version auctioned at Sotheby's 4 November 2009, London, lot 56, one version in the church of St. Martin, Bergues, and another in the New Gallery (Kassel) (now considered a copy)), which was originally considered a work by van Veen. The composition itself is loosely based on Rubens' work of the same subject in the Hermitage Museum, Saint Petersburg, but reversed. A more dynamic Baroque style influenced by Rubens arose after 1630.

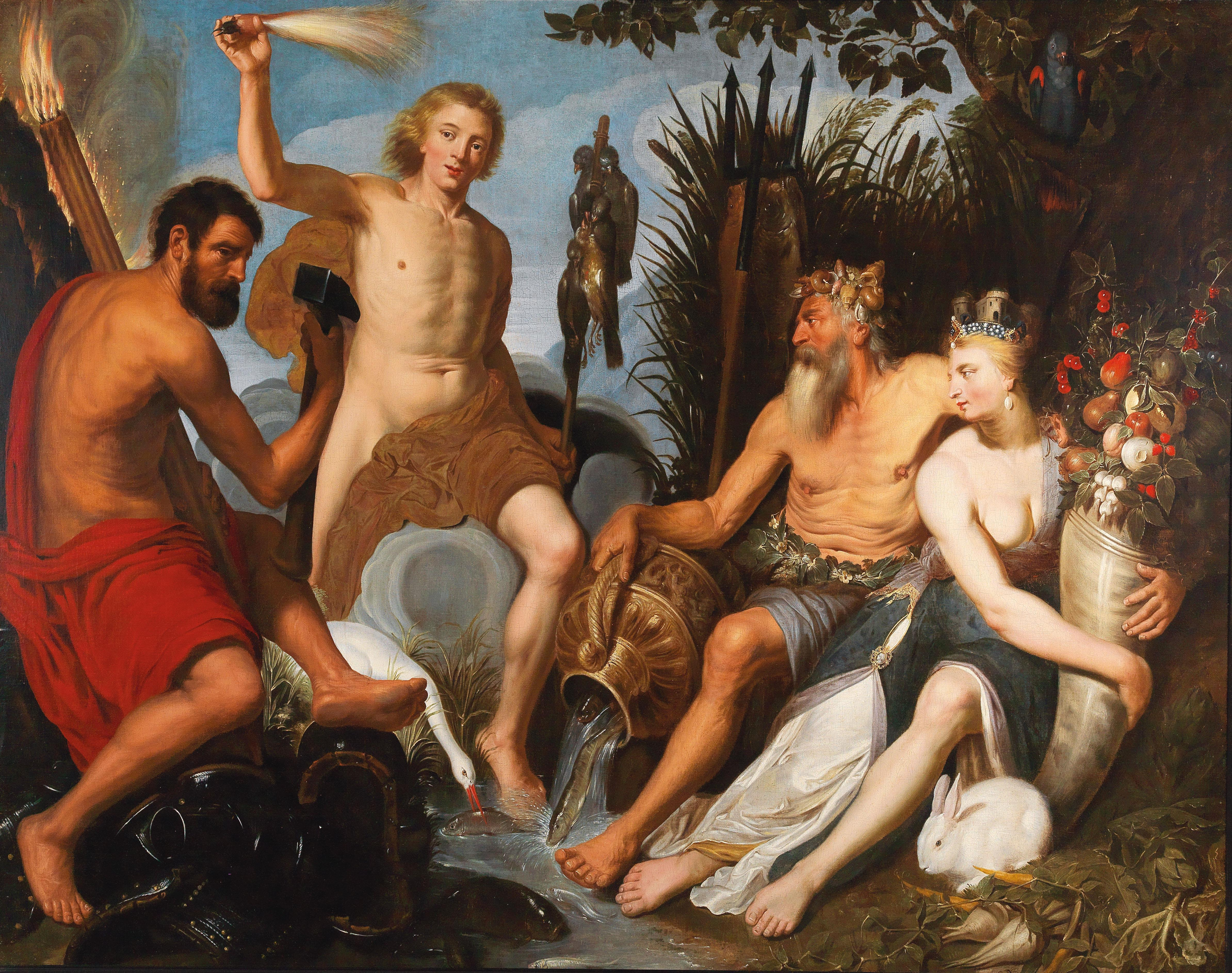
The Four Elements
