= Gerard Thomas =

Flemish Baroque painter

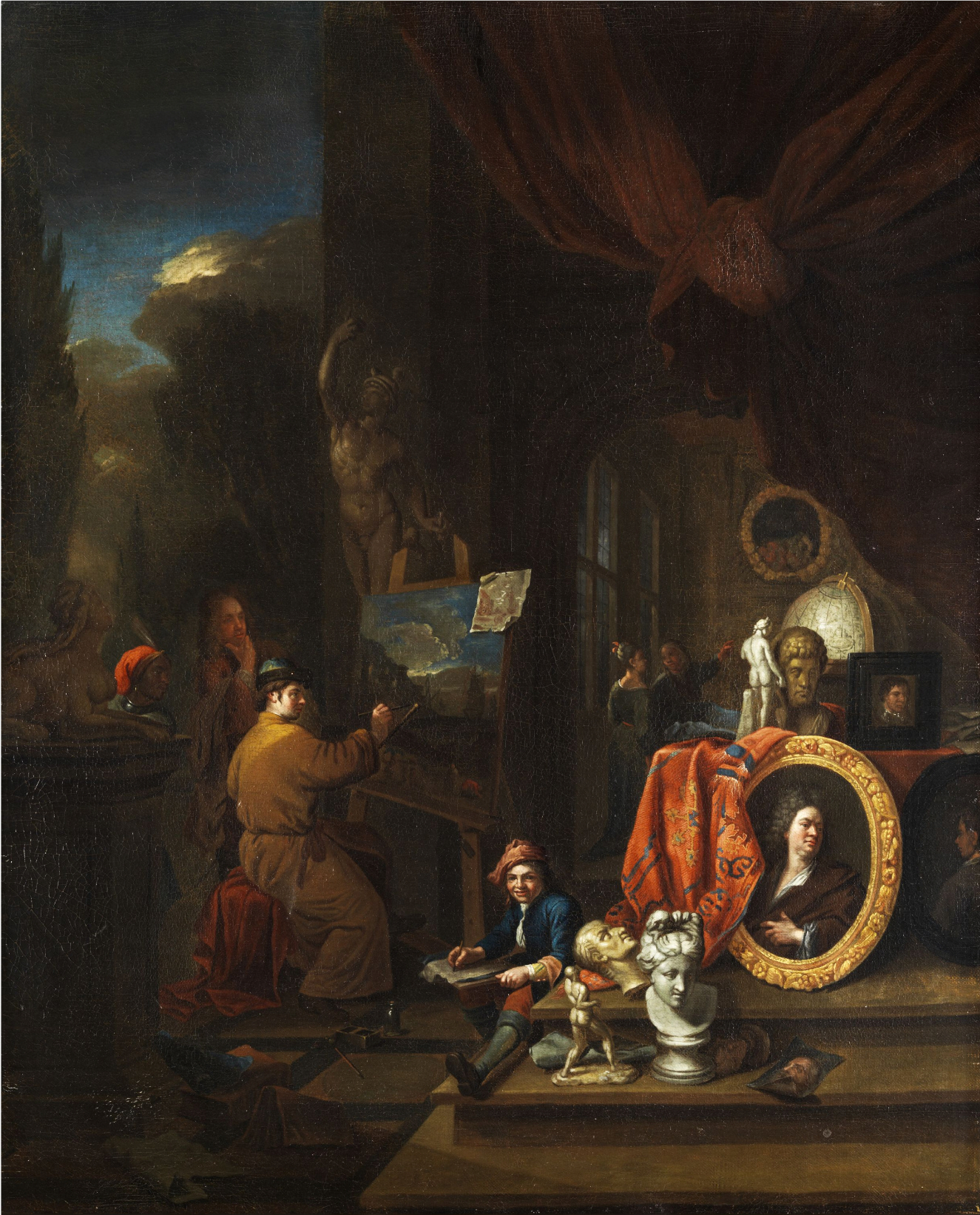
Gerard Thomas: The painter in his studio

Gerard Thomas (1663–1721) was a late Flemish Baroque painter who specialized in studio and picture gallery interiors. He became a master in Antwerp's Guild of St. Luke in 1688–89, and was dean twice. Many of his paintings reflect a trend in Antwerp painting around 1700 that shows artists—often historical masters from earlier in the century like Peter Paul Rubens, Anthony van Dyck or Jacob Jordaens—in their studios, surrounded by paintings and sculptures, and teaching the craft to a young apprentice. The masters are often only hinted by the works of art pictured in the painting itself, however.

== Sources ==
- Filipczak, Z. Z. (1987). Picturing art in Antwerp, 1550–1700. Princeton, N.J.: Princeton University Press. ISBN 0-691-04047-8
