= Roels =

Roels is a Dutch patronymic surname ("Roel's son") most common in East Flanders. People with this surname include:

- Dominik Roels (born 1987), German racing cyclist
- Frederick Roels (1891–1939), Australian (New South Wales) politician
- Louis Roels (1912–1984), Belgian racing cyclist
- Oscar Roels (1864–1938), Flemish composer and conductor
- Rene Roels (born 1937), Belgian sprint canoer
- Willem Roels (1889–1951), Dutch Olympic wrestler

== See also ==
- Roel, Dutch masculine given name
- Roelandts, Dutch surname of similar origin
- Roelofs, Dutch surname of similar origin
