= Jacob Foppens van Es =

Flemish painter (c.1596–1666)

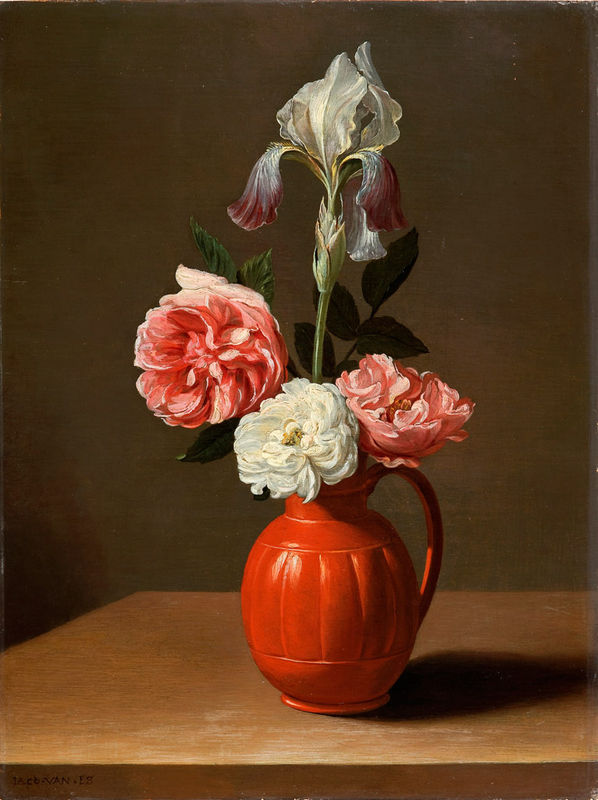
An iris and three roses in an earthenware pot

Jacob Foppens van Es, Jacob Fopsen van Es or Jacob van Es (c. 1596 Antwerp – 1666 Antwerp) was a Flemish Baroque painter known for his still lifes mainly of food and occasionally flower paintings. He collaborated with other artists on garland paintings. Together with Osias Beert and Clara Peeters, he was one of the leading representatives of the first generation in Flemish still-life painting.

== Life ==
Biographical data about Jacob Foppens van Es' life are scarce. The inscription on a portrait of Foppens van Es engraved by Wenceslaus Hollar after a design by Joannes Meyssens states that he was born in Antwerp. There is no documentary evidence that corroborates his place of birth. In 1617 he became a master of the Antwerp Guild of St. Luke. The fact that he was not registered as a pupil with the Guild before becoming a master, indicates that he likely trained outside Antwerp.

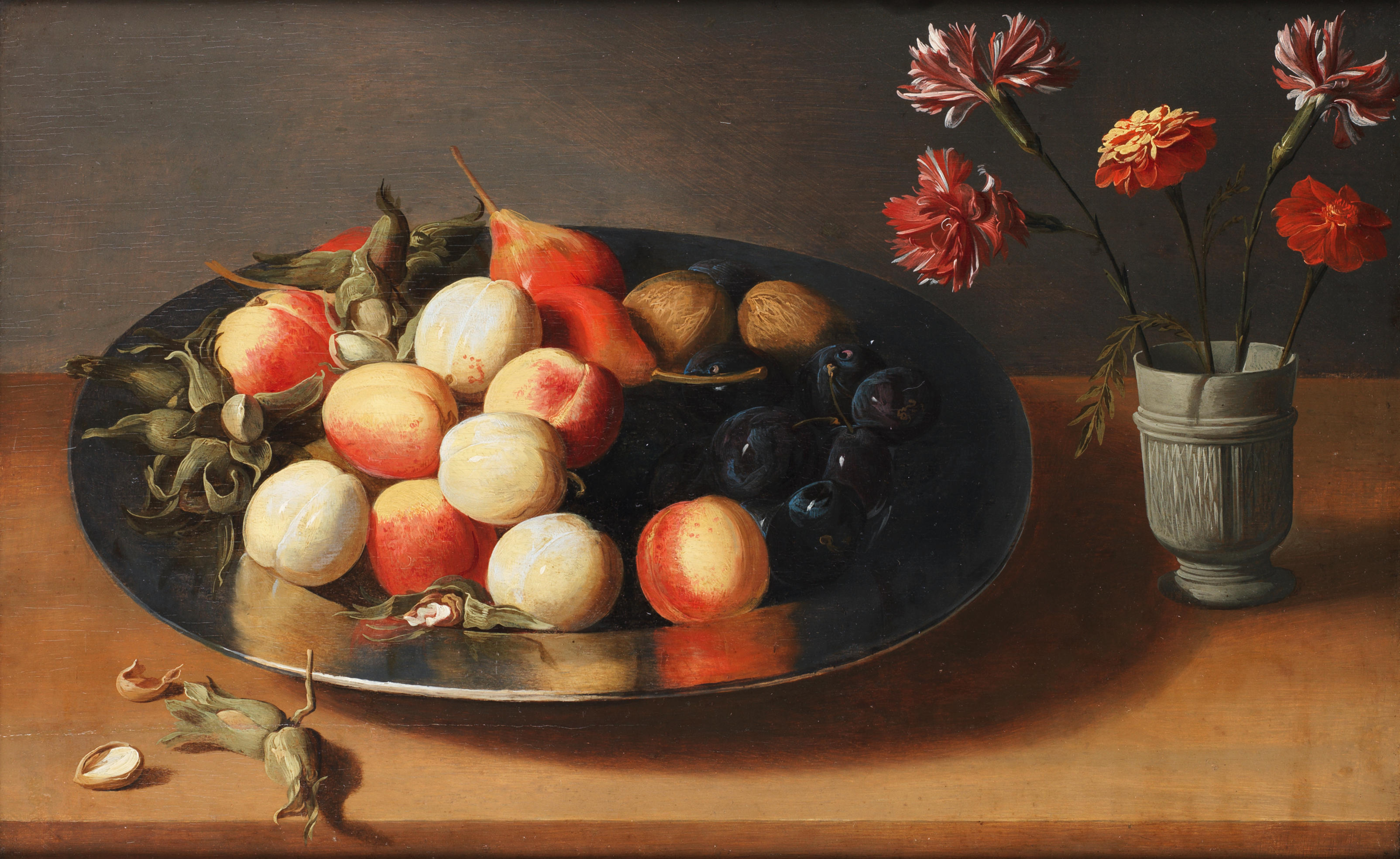
Fruit, nuts and a vase of carnations on a table top

At the time of his registration as a master in Antwerp, he was already married to Joanna Claessens with whom he had a son called Nicolaas. Nicolaas became a master of the Guild in 1648. Jacob Foppens van Es and his wife had three more sons and three daughters. The fact that the godfathers of his last three children were the prominent artists Jacob Jordaens, Cornelis Schut and Deodat del Monte shows that he had a respected position among the leading Antwerp artists. These artists were also godfathers to his children.

His success as an artist is testified by evidence that works of his were recorded in many 17th century Antwerp collections. Even the inventory of the leading Flemish Baroque painter Peter Paul Rubens included two of his works. Further proof of his success is that his portrait made by Joannes Meyssens and engraved by Wenceslaus Hollar was included in the collection of artist portraits entitled Images de Divers Hommes Despirit Sublime qui par leur art et science debvrovent vivre eternellement et des quels la louange et renomée facit estonner le monde ('Images of Various Men of Sublime Spirit who by their art and science should live forever and whose praise and renown astound the world'), published in Antwerp in 1649, with the following text:

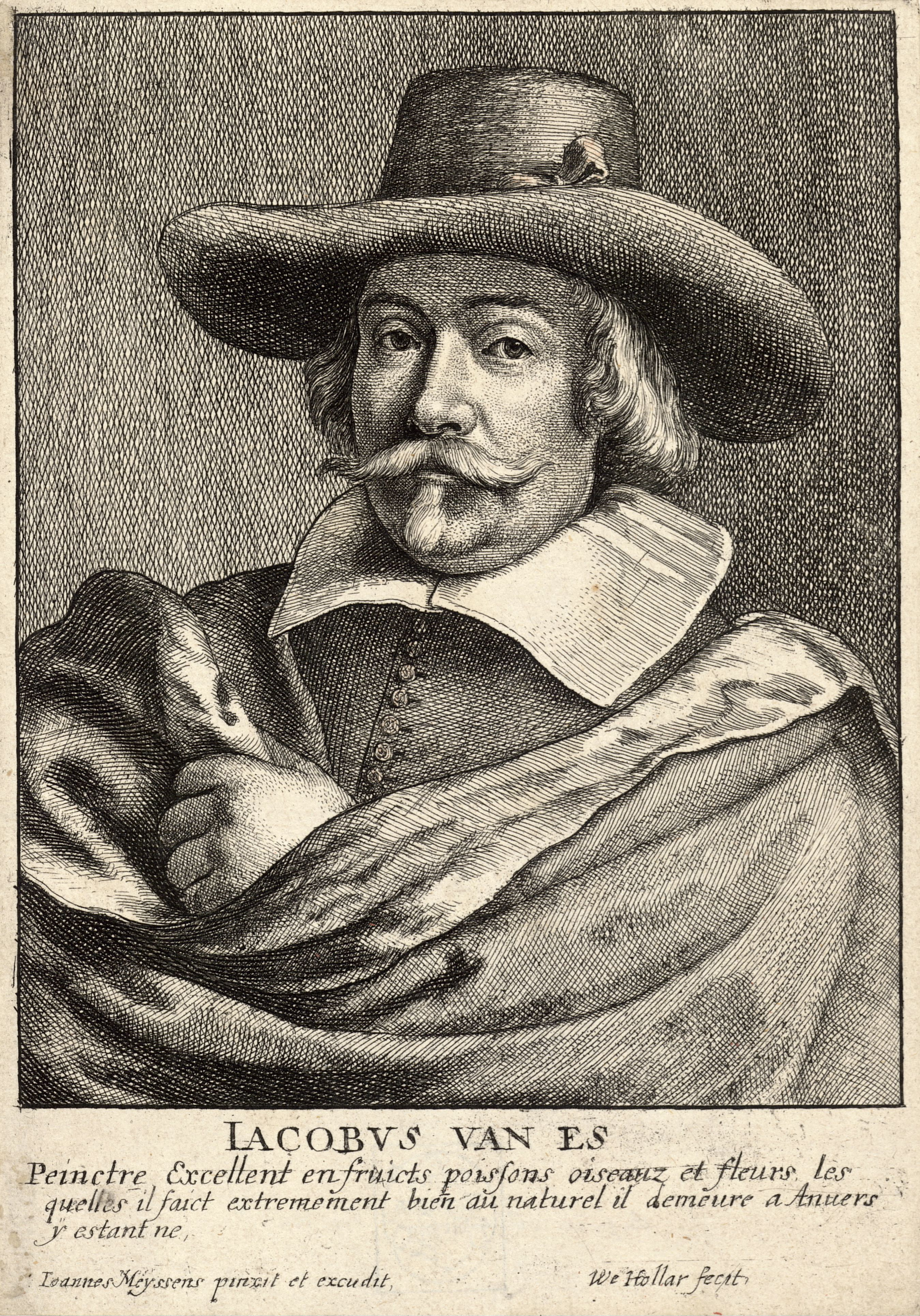
Jacob van Es by Wenceslaus Hollar

IACOBVS VAN ES/ Peinctre Excellent en fruicts poissons oiseauz et fleurs les/ quelles il faict extremement bien au naturel il demeure a Anvers/ y estant ne.

(Translation: Jacobus van Es, painter who excels in fruit, fish, birds and flowers which he renders very well as nature he lives in Antwerp where he was born)

He was active in Antwerp for 50 years. His pupils included Jacob Gillis in 1621 and Jan van Tienen in 1623.

He was buried in Antwerp on 11 March 1666.

== Works ==
=== General ===
Jacob Foppens van Es was a very prolific artist. About 125 of his works have survived. The pictures are usually signed with his full name "I. (or IACOB) VAN ES". As he did not generally date his works, it is impossible to establish the chronology or evolution in his work.

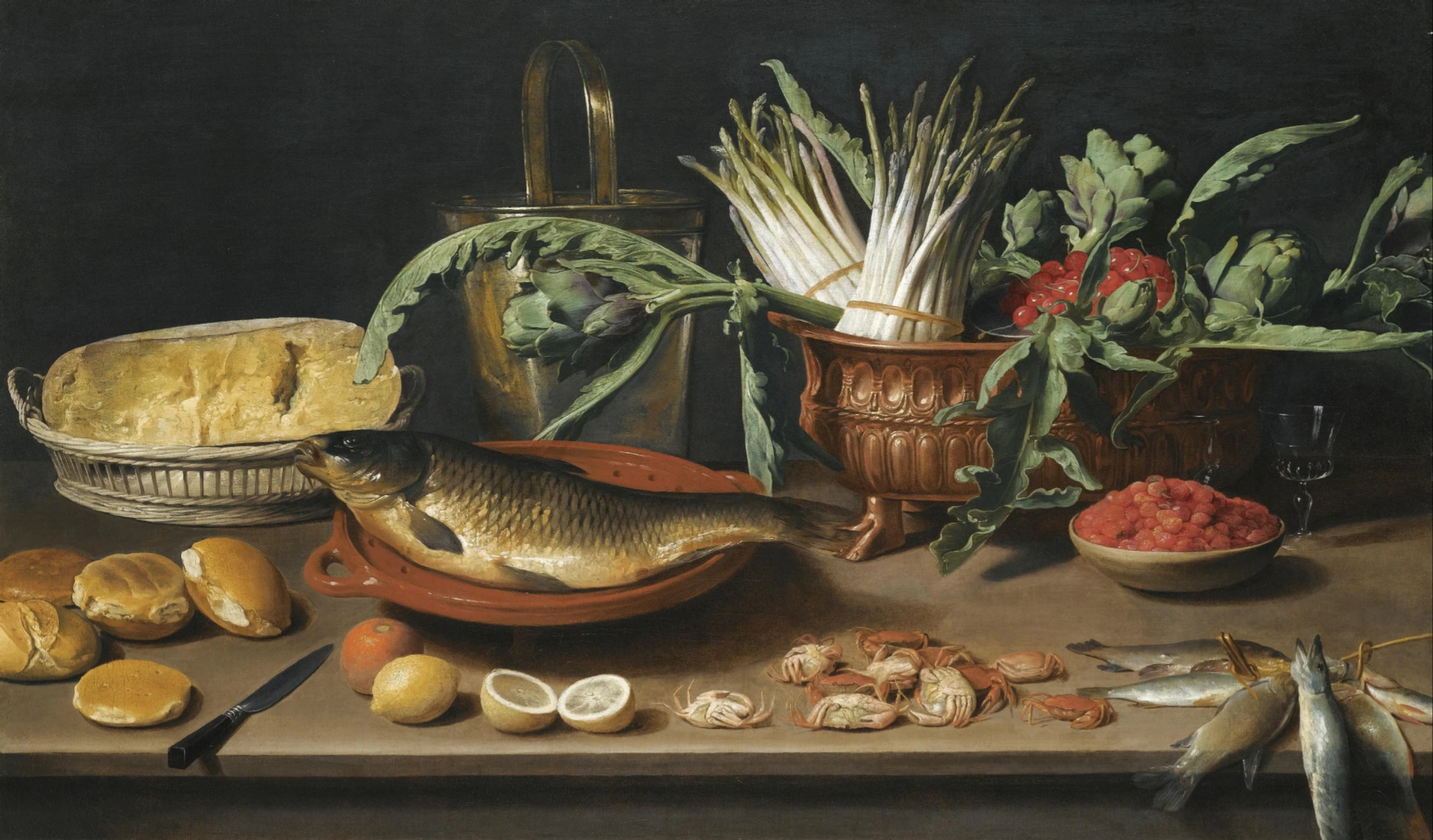
Still life with fish, asparagus, artichokes and cherries etc. on a table top

Jacob Foppens van Es painted mainly still lifes and in particular still lifes of food. They typically depict fruit, fish, lobster, oysters, mussels, cheese, ham, bread, olives, lemons and oranges together with objects such as glassware, pitchers and silver. Occasionally his compositions include animals such as butterflies, birds or squirrels or a flower. His still lifes typically depict a random accumulation of unrelated objects on a sharply inclined table with the principal concern being the realisation of rich colour.

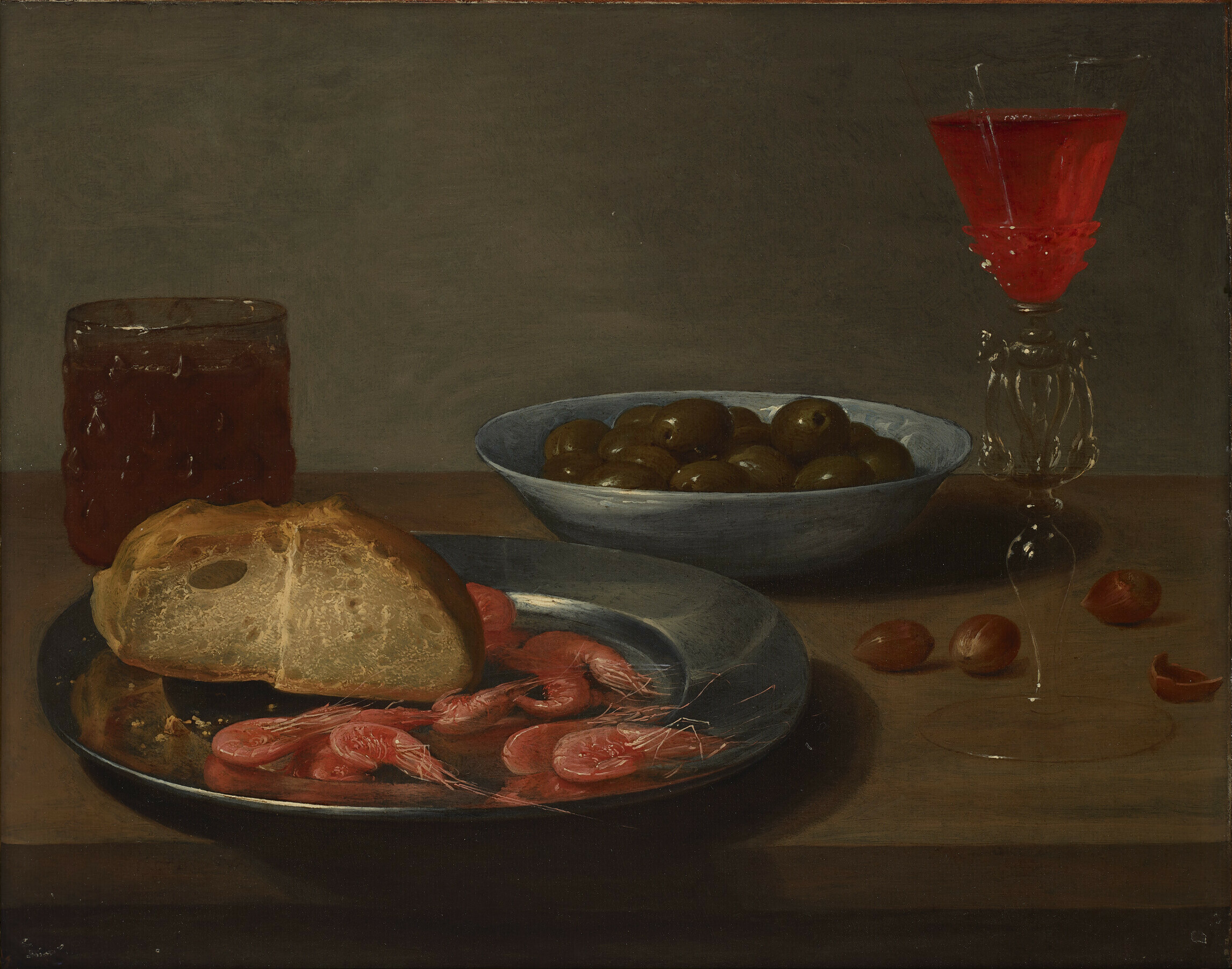
A plate with prawns and a roll, a bowl with olives, a façon de Venise, a glass of beer and almonds on a table

His still lifes are generally archaizing in style and follow the small 'breakfast still life's' of the Flemish masters Osias Beert and Clara Peeters. He later came under the influence of the Dutch still life painter Floris van Schooten. His works achieve a sense of three-dimensionality through dramatic lighting and a wide range of colours.

=== Flower pieces ===
He also produced about five to six flower pieces which are of an exceptional simplicity, use original colour combinations and a powerful technique. An example is An iris and three roses in an earthenware pot (Fondation Custodia, Paris). This composition is of a charming simplicity with its three roses and an iris placed in an earthenware jug on a wooden table. The extreme simplicity of the arrangement, the few, perfectly harmonized shades and the spontaneous but firm brushstroke make the panel exceptional in Flemish still life painting as a whole. The muted palette may indicate that this work was created around 1630.

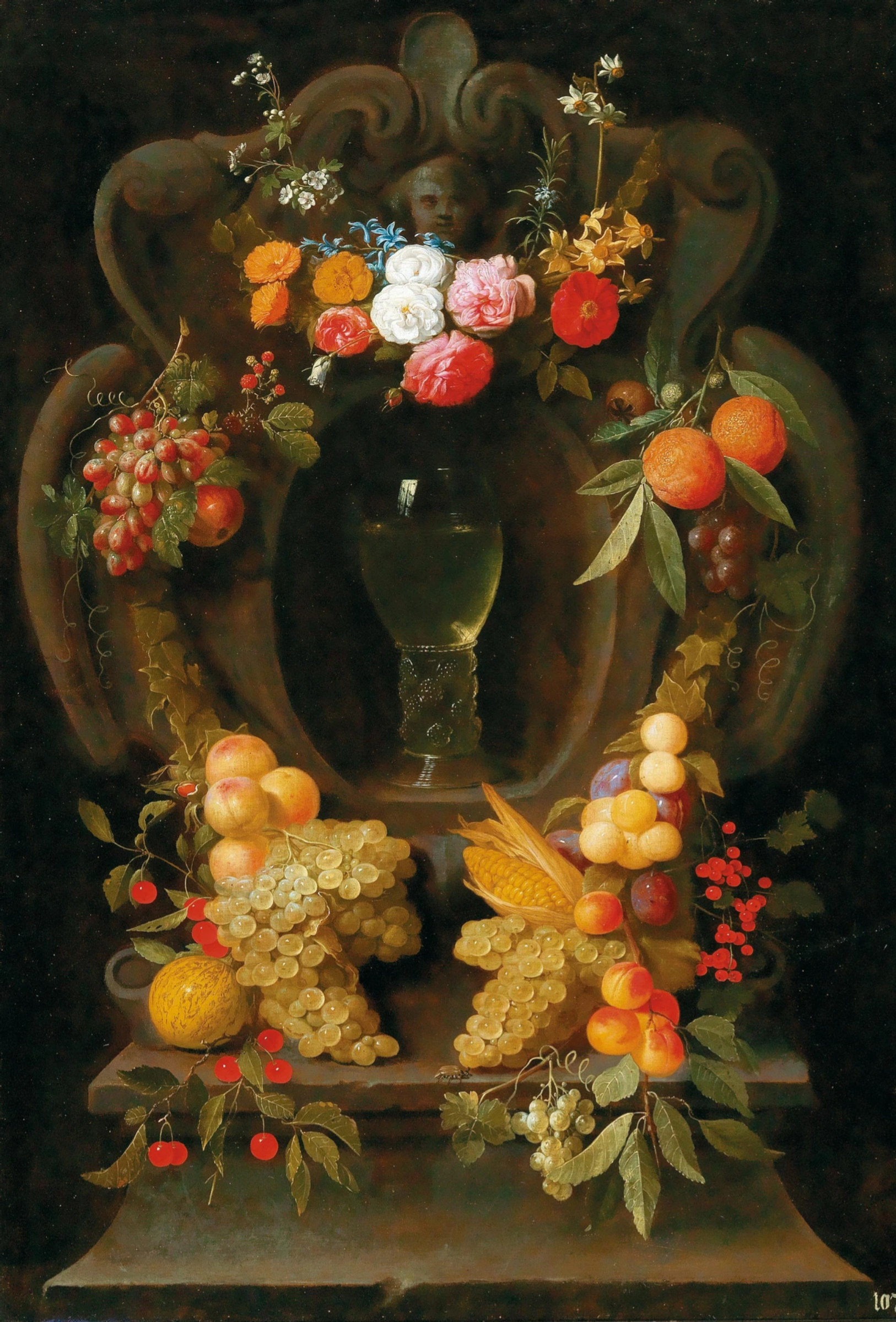
Garland of fruit and flowers around a cartouche with a glass of wine

=== Garland paintings ===
Foppens van Es occasionally worked on garland paintings in which the staffage was painted by other artists. Garland paintings are a special type of still life developed in Antwerp by Jan Brueghel the Elder and Hendrick van Balen at the request of the Italian cardinal Federico Borromeo at the beginning of the 17th century. Other artists involved in the early development of the genre included Andries Daniels, Peter Paul Rubens and Daniel Seghers.

The garland genre was initially connected to the visual imagery of the Counter-Reformation movement. It was further inspired by the cult of veneration and devotion to Mary prevalent at the Habsburg court (then the rulers over the Southern Netherlands) and in Antwerp generally. Garland paintings typically show a flower garland around a devotional image, portrait or other religious symbol (such as the host).

An example of a collaboration by Foppens van Es on a garland painting is Garland of flowers and fruit around a cartouche with the Holy Family (Musée des Beaux-Arts d'Orléans) (c. 1620–1630). Hendrick van Balen is believed to have painted the cartouche while Foppens van Es painted the garland of fruit and flowers.
