= Johannes Kuveenis the Elder =

Dutch painter (born c. 1620)

Johannes Kuveenis the Elder, or Cuevenis or Cuvenes (Bremen, c. 1620 – The Hague, post 1666), was a Dutch painter of the Dutch Golden Age. He is known for his still lifes, which mainly depict dishes on shelves indoors and sometimes game outdoors.

== Biography ==
Little evidence supports knowledge about the artist's life. Contemporary sources report that, born in Bremen, in Lower Saxony, during the Thirty Years' War he moved to The Hague, where he married, in 1649, Catharina Cornelia van Doesburch and in 1652 was the father of Johannes Kuveenis II, who would also be a painter. He became a member of the local Guild in 1650, also serving, in 1655, in the relevant militia. He worked in The Hague until 1659 and then moved, around the middle of the seventh decade, to Amsterdam. The date of his death, which occurred in The Hague, is uncertain, but it is presumed to be shortly after 1666.

== Artistic activity ==
Few works of certain authorship are known today by Kuveenis, although there is news of payments, made in 1650, following the sale of his paintings at auctions organised by the Hague Guild. The small number of certain signed works has so far hindered the initiation of a monographic critical study on the artist.

His still life paintings focus on fruit and vegetables, fish, game and everyday edible objects, on simple tables, and are free from symbolic or allegorical connotations. Despite the simplicity of his forms and compositional structure, in the panorama of Flemish-Dutch still life painters of the first half of the century, Kuveenis can be included, with Floris van Schooten, in the category of the so-called Dutch 'decorative painters', on a par with the Flemish Frans Snyders and Jan Fyt, who in the same years elaborated opulent still life compositions. He signed as "J. Kuveenis", with the J sometimes superimposed on an O to form the monogram JO (for Johannes).

== Works ==
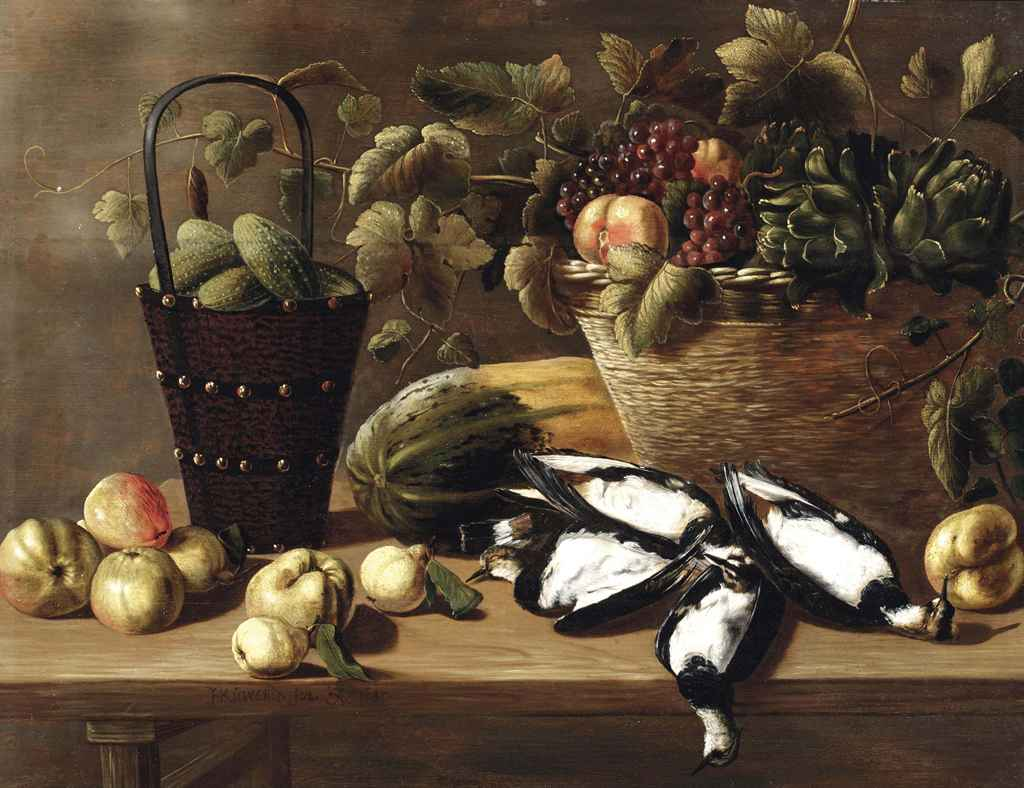
Apples, pears, a melon, a bucket with gherkins and a basket with grapes, peaches and artichokes, all on a wooden table with four lapwings, 1645, oil on panel

- Still Life with Fish and a Ceramic Jug on a Table, oil on panel, Fries Museum, Leeuwarden, Netherlands.
- Apples, Pears, a Melon, a Bucket with Cucumbers and a Basket with Grapes, Peaches and Artichokes, on a Wooden Table with Four Lapwings, dated 1645, oil on panel.
- Still Life with Herring, Cheese, Crab and Birds, dated 1645, oil on panel.
- Still Life with Various Fish, a Shell, a Terracotta Jug and Other Objects, on a Wooden Table, dated 1647, oil on panel.
- Hunting scene with a hound, a dead heron, feathered game, a birdcage and a rifle, oil on canvas.
- Ruff hanging from a ribbon, oil on panel, dated 1647.
