= Roslof =

Roslof is a surname. Notable people with the surname include:

- Jim Roslof (1946–2011), American artist
- Laura Roslof (1948–2018), American artist

== See also ==
- Roelof
