= Roelofsen =

Roelofsen is a Dutch patronymic surname ("Roelof's son"). People with this surname include:

- Diane Roelofsen (born 1975), Dutch handball player
- Grant Roelofsen (born 1996), South African cricketer
- Johan Roelofsen (1933–2011), Dutch milkman and inventor of wagon-bed riding
- Marco Roelofsen (born 1969), Dutch association football midfielder
- Pieter Roelofsen (1908–1966), Dutch rower
- Richard Roelofsen (born 1968), Dutch association football striker
- Ruan Roelofse (born 1989), South African tennis player

== See also ==
- Roelofs, Dutch surname of the same origin
