= Floris van Dyck =

Dutch painter

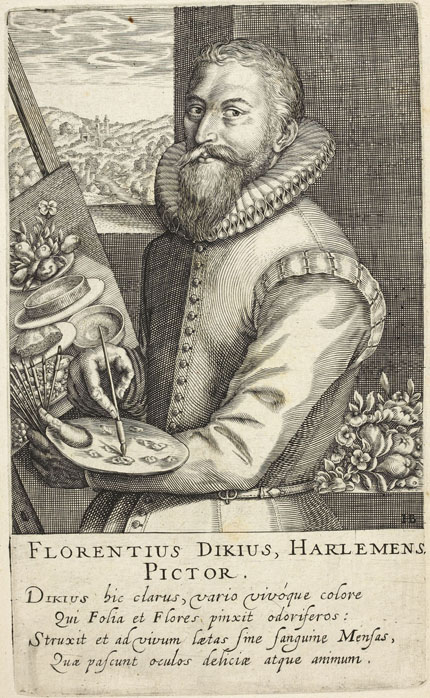
Portrait of "Florentius Dikius Harlemens", by Hendrik Hondius I for his Pictorum, 1610

Floris van Dyck, also called Floris van Dijck or Floris Claesz. van Dyck (c.1575 – before 26 April 1651) was a Dutch Golden Age still life painter.

== Biography ==
Van Dyck lived in Haarlem for most of his life, but he was born in Delft. He was a cousin of Pieter Cornelisz van Rijck, whose father, Cornelis, first had a brewery in Delft before moving to the "De Olyphant" brewery in Haarlem. In 1600 he was documented as being in Rome, where he was a good friend of Joseph van Arpino and witnessed him being cured of an ailment with Olio del gran Duco, an oil given to him by the Pope's personal physician, with which he smeared himself all over his body. Thanks to this miracle cure, Arpino could finish an altarpiece in the Archbasilica of St. John Lateran.

In 1606, he returned to the Netherlands, where he settled in Haarlem and became one of Karel van Mander's sources on modern Italian painters for his Schilder-boeck. He probably lived with or near his uncle, the brewer Cornelis van Rijck. Like the young Frans Hals and other assistants to Karel van Mander, Floris is not listed with his own entry in that book, though he was already an established painter on his return from Italy. After Karel van Mander's death, Floris joined the Haarlem Guild of St. Luke in 1610 and became dean in 1637. On 11 September 1625, he married for the second time to Cornelia Jansdr. Vlasman and the wealthy Gijsbert Claesz van Campen were his only witnesses.

He was influenced by Osias Beert and Clara Peeters and is considered the inventor of the banketje (banquet still life genre similar to breakfasts, or ontbijtjes), together with Nicolaes Gillis. Besides Nicolaes Gilles, he influenced the painters Floris van Schooten, Pieter Claesz, and Roelof Koets. He died in Haarlem.

Paintings

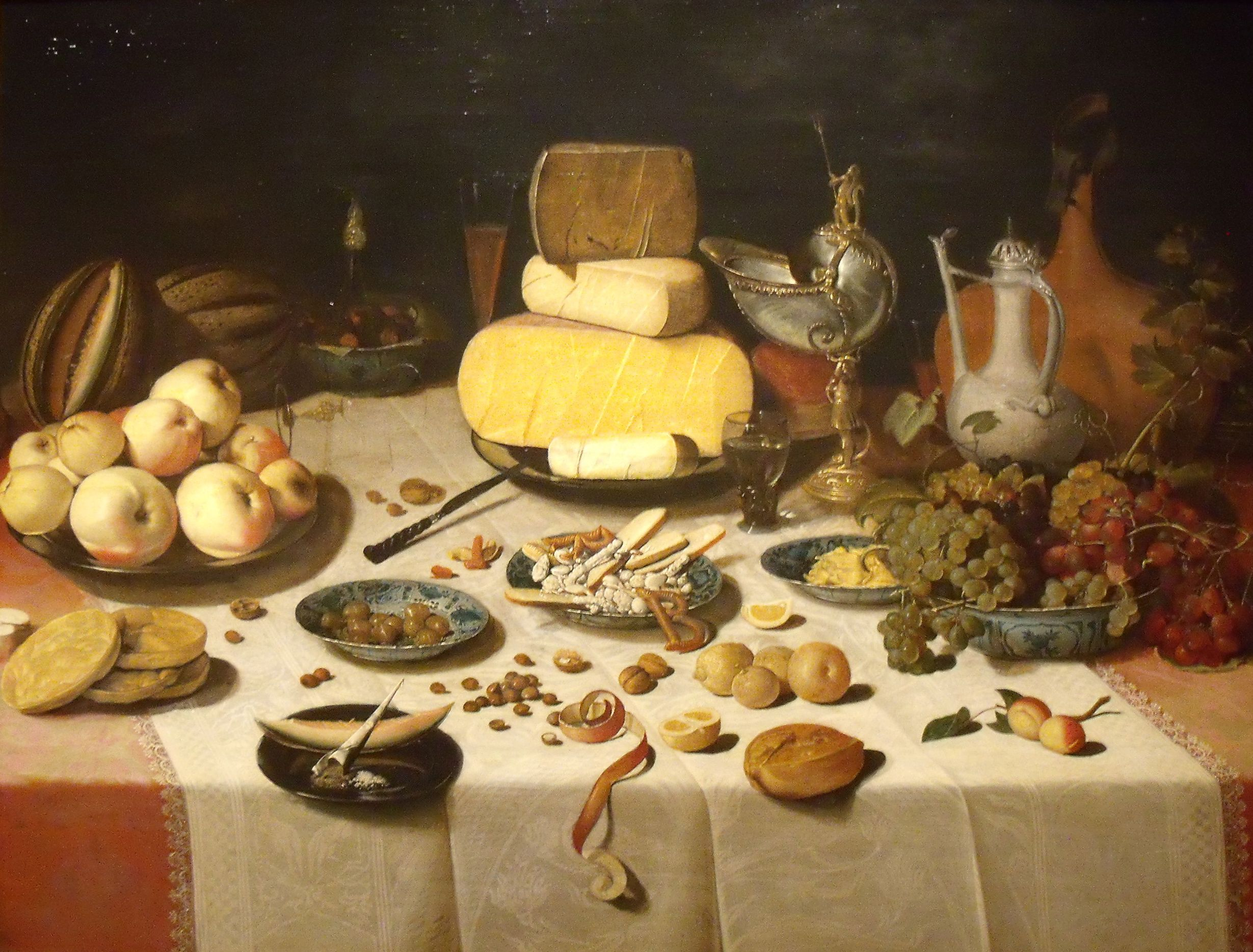
Dutch banquet with cheese, bread, nuts and fruit

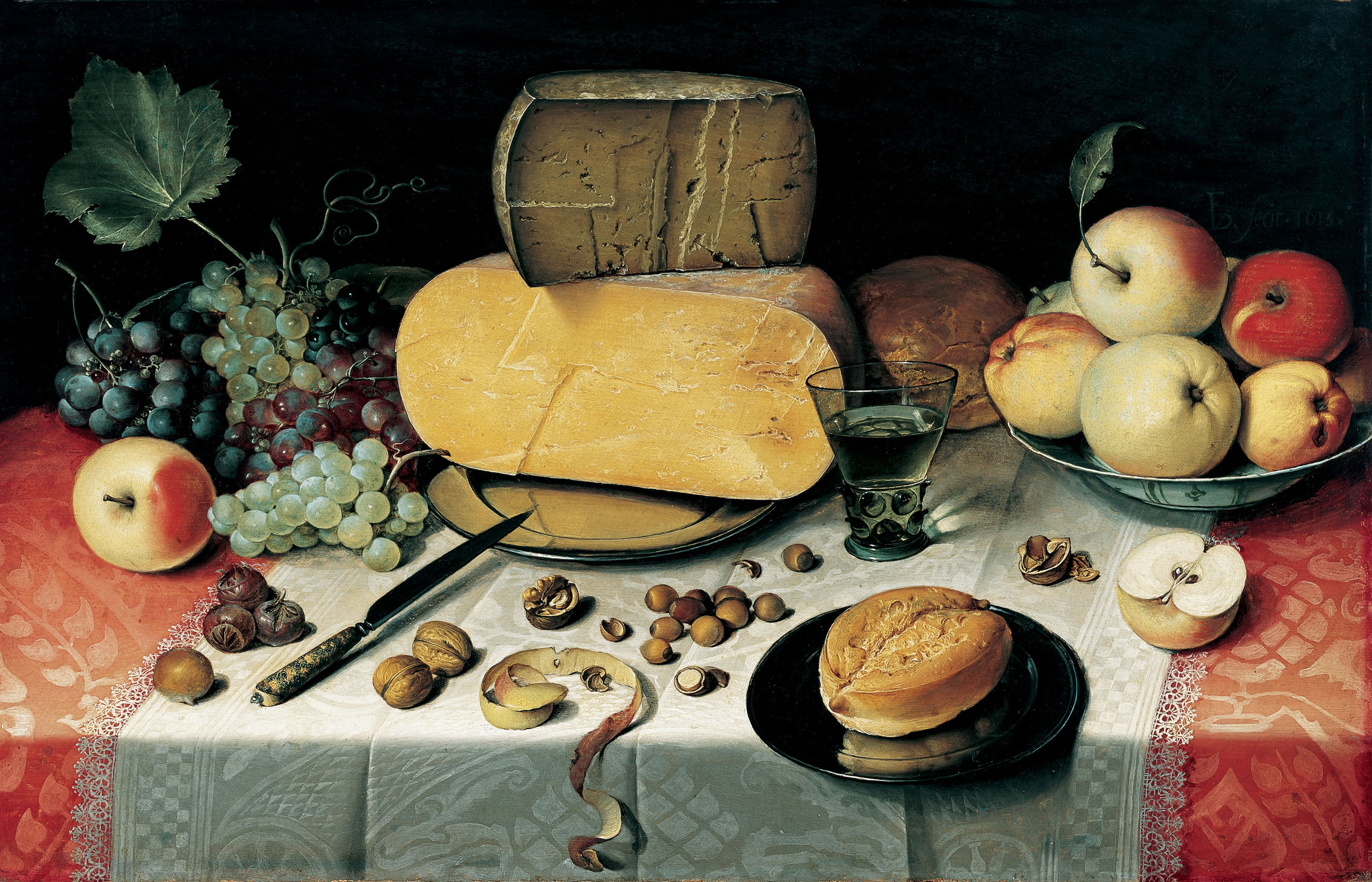
Ontbijtje still life from 1610 at the Frans Hals Museum, showing a Dutch breakfast with cheese, bread, nuts and fruit, served on a fine white linen napkin protecting the tablecloth, which is a red or karmozijn example of a kind popular in 17th-century Haarlem

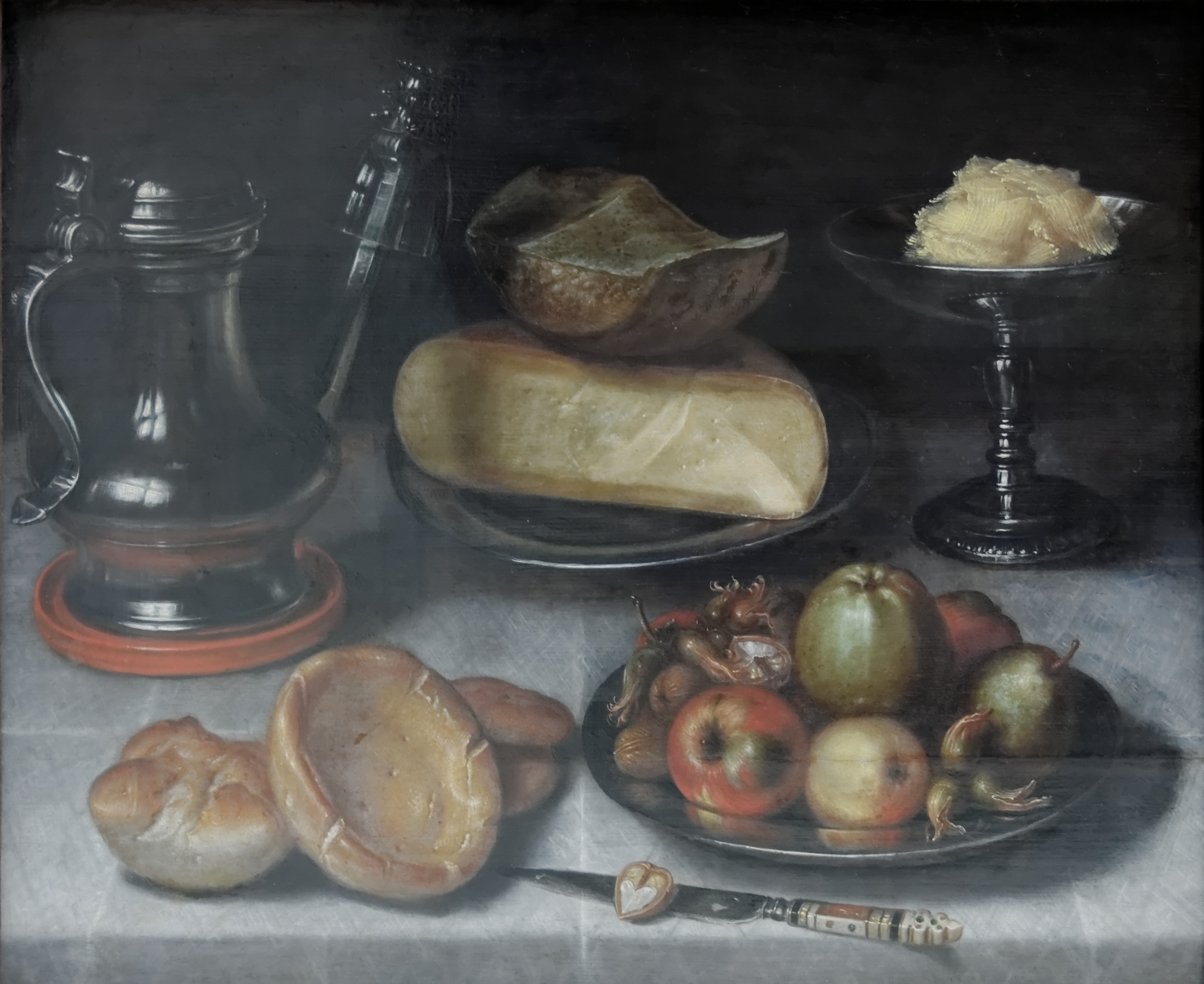
Still life with pewter jug, fruit, and cheese

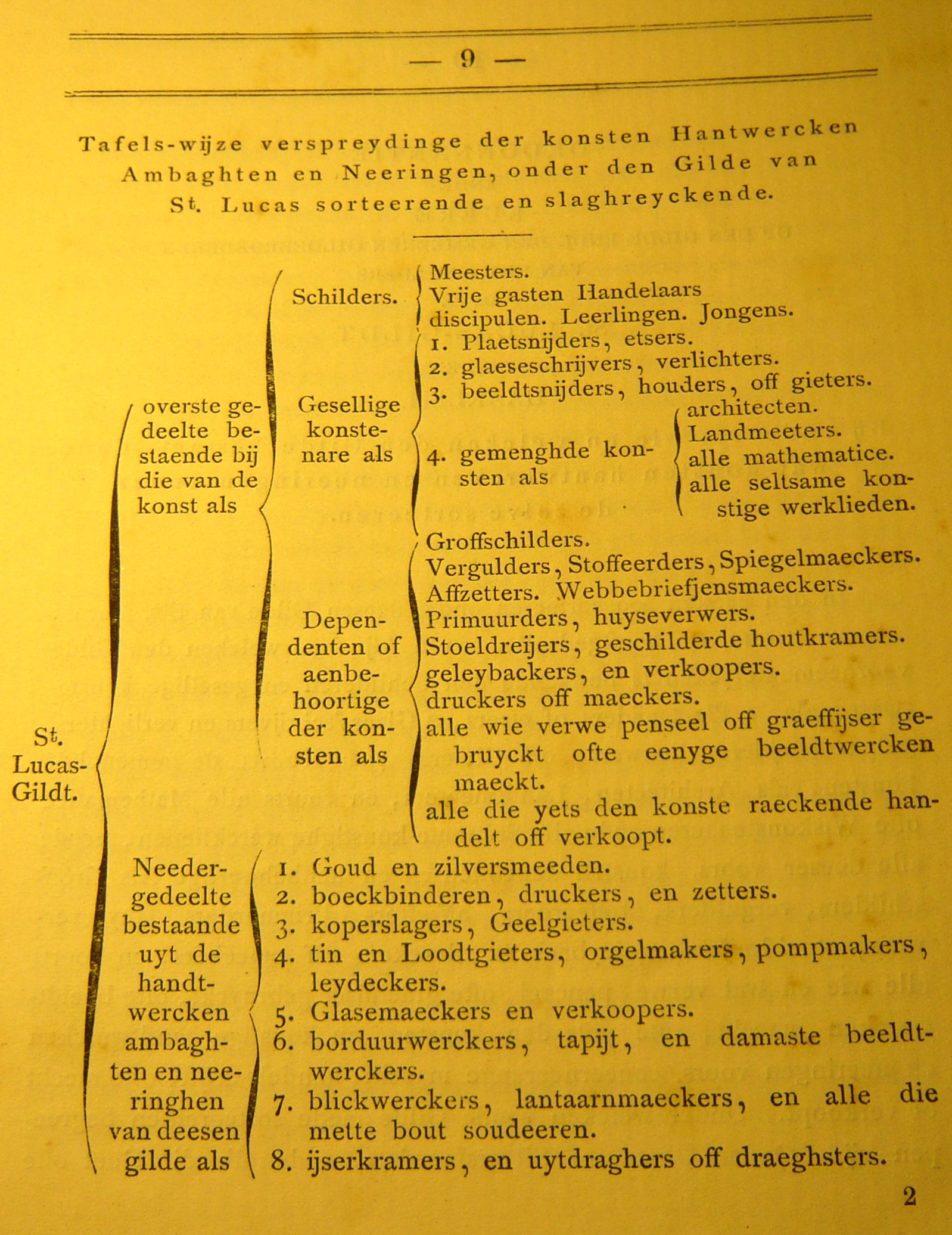
Transcription from 1877 of the proposed Haarlem painters' guild hierarchy in 1631. Floris van Dyck was one of the signatories, along with Pieter de Molijn, Outgert Ariss Akersloot, Willem Claesz Heda, Salomon de Bray, Cornelis Cornelisz, Cornelis Claesz van Wieringen, and Isaak Halinck.

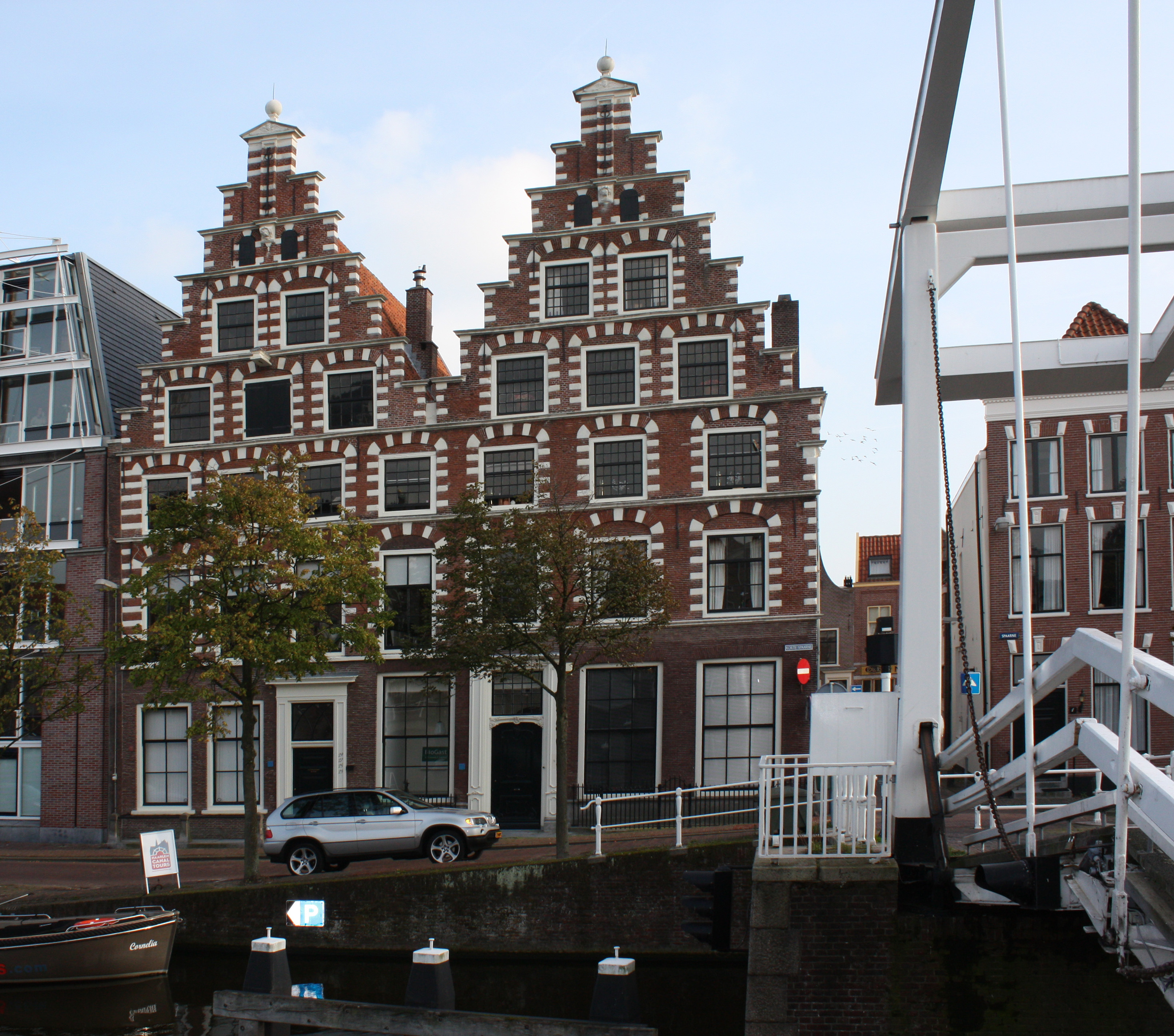
The former "De Olyphant" brewery, where Cornelis van Rijck lived and worked, and where he and his cousin Pieter probably kept a studio.
