= Roel =

Roel may refer to a Dutch masculine given name that is a short form of either Roeland or Roelof, or to a Hispanic surname. People with the name include

== Given name ==
=== Academics ===
- Roel van den Broek (born 1931), Dutch religious history scholar
- Roel Konijnendijk, Dutch historian and Classicist
- Roel Kuiper (born 1962), Dutch historian, philosopher, and politician
- Roel Nusse (born 1950), Dutch developmental biologist at Stanford University
- Roel Sterckx (born 1969), Belgian-British sinologist and anthropologist
- Roel in 't Veld, (born 1942), Dutch Public administration scholar
- Roel Vertegaal (born 1968), Dutch-Canadian computer interface scientist
- Roel Wieringa (born 1952), Dutch computer scientist

=== Arts ===
- Roel Bos (born 1942), Dutch movie actor, in Italy known as "Glenn Saxson"
- Roel Cortez (1967–2015), Filipino singer and songwriter
- Roel D’Haese (1921–1996), Belgian surrealist sculptor and graphic artist
- Roel Dieltiens (born 1957), Belgian cellist and composer
- Roel Caboverde Llacer (born 1947), Cuban painter
- Roel Reiné (born 1969), Los Angeles-based Dutch film director
- Roel van Velzen (born 1978), Dutch singer and songwriter
- Roel Jeroen van der Linden (born 1982), Dutch painter

=== Business ===
- Roel Campos (born 1949), Hispanic-American business lawyer
- Roel Pieper (born 1956), Dutch IT-entrepreneur
- Roel de Vries (born 1968), Dutch born engineer and businessman

=== Politics ===
- Roel Degamo (1966–2023), Filipino politician
- Roel van Duijn (born 1943), Dutch politician, political activist and writer
- Roel Robbertsen (born 1948), Dutch politician
- Roel de Vries (born 1943), Dutch trade union leader
- Roel de Wit (1927–2012), Dutch Labour Party politician and conservationist

=== Sports ===
- Roel Boomstra (born 1993), Dutch draughts player
- Roel Braas (born 1987), Dutch rower
- Roel Brouwers (born 1981), Dutch football defender
- Roel Buikema (born 1976), Dutch football midfielder
- Roel van Hemert (born 1984), Dutch football defender
- Roel Janssen (born 1990), Dutch football defender
- Roel Koolen (born 1982), Dutch baseball player
- Roel Luynenburg (1945–2023), Dutch rower
- Roel de Mon (1919–1973), Dutch baseball pitcher
- Roel Moors (born 1978), Belgian basketball player
- Roel Paulissen (born 1976), Belgian mountain biker
- Roel Rothkrans (born 1979), Dutch handball player
- Roel van de Sande (born 1987), Dutch football midfielder
- Roel Santos (born 1987), Cuban baseball player
- Roel Stoffels (born 1987), Dutch football midfielder
- Roel Velasco (born 1969), Filipino boxer
- Roel Wiersma (1932–1995), Dutch football defender
- Roel De Bie (born 1988), Belgian volleyball player

=== Fictional ===
- Roel Dijkstra, eponymous football player of a comic book series (1977–1995)

== Surname ==
- César Roel Schreurs (born 1941), Mexican actor and rock-and-roll singer
- Fernando García Roel (1921 – 2009), Mexican chemical engineer
- Gabriela Roel (born 1959), Mexican film and television actress
- José Roel Lungay (born 1960, also known as Father Roel, or Fro), Filipino priest
- Lise Roel (1928–2017), architect from Denmark
- Válber Roel de Oliveira (born 1967), former association footballer from Brazil
