= Nicolaes Gillis =

Dutch Golden Age painter

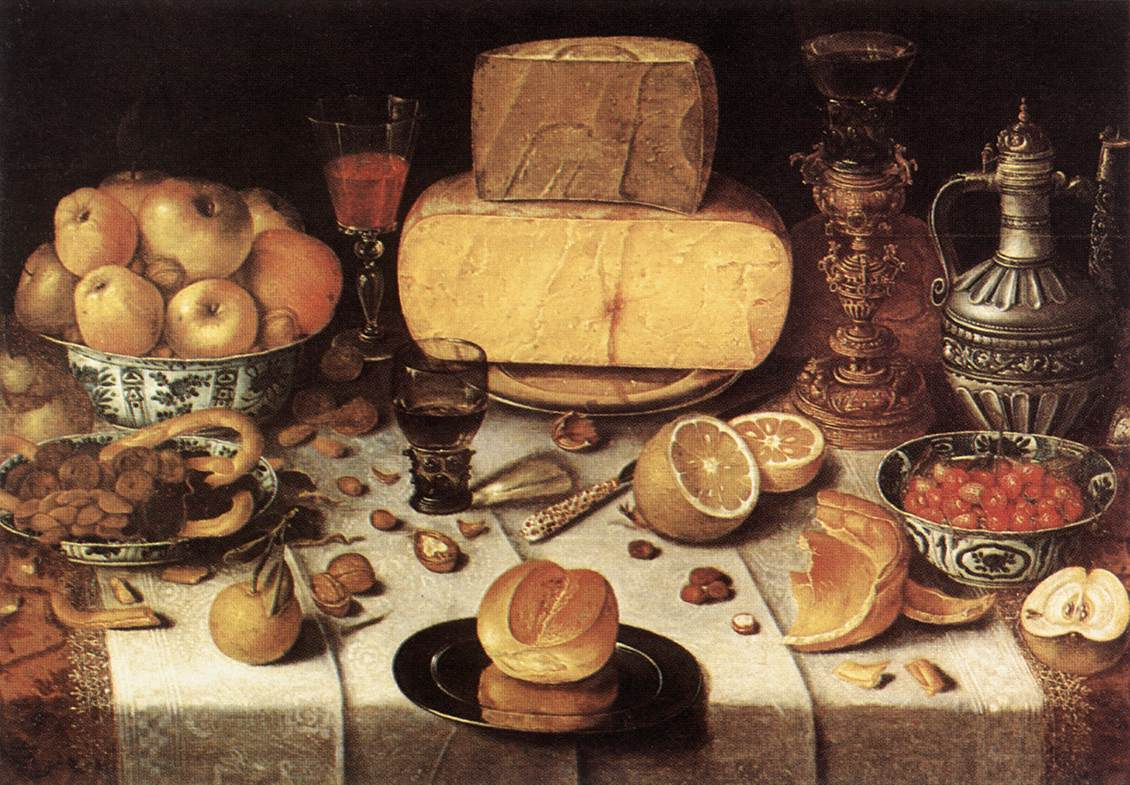
Still life, 1611

Nicolaes Gillis (1593, Antwerp – 1630, Haarlem), was a Dutch Golden Age still life painter.

== Biography ==
Gillis was one of the first artists to paint independent still life paintings and is considered a pioneer of the Haarlem fruit and flower still life. His oeuvre consists of fruit and flower still lifes and he was one of the first few painters of the banketje, or "breakfast still life". After training in Antwerp, where Gillis learned much from Osias Beert, he moved to Haarlem, bringing these Antwerp influences with him. Research has revealed a fruitful exchange of influences with his colleague Floris van Dyck.

He married Tanneken Abeels in Haarlem in 1615 and is documented there up to his passing in 1630.
