= Roelof =

Given name

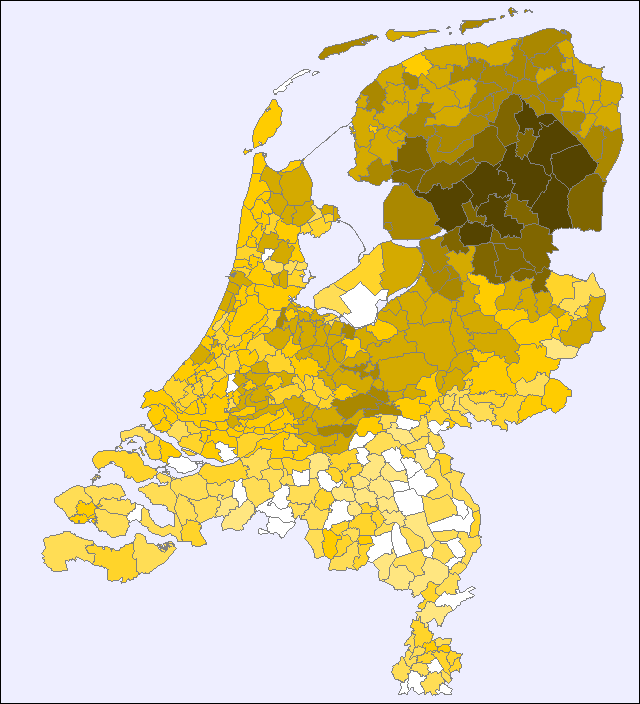
Distribution map of Dutch people named Roelof born before 2018

Roelof is a given name, the Dutch cognate of Rudolph. Notable people with the name include:

- Roelof Bisschop (born 1956), Dutch historian and politician
- Roelof Botha (born 1973), venture capitalist and company director
- Roelof Frederik Botha or Pik Botha (1932–2018), former politician from South Africa
- Johannes Roelof Maria van den Brink (1915–2006), Dutch politician and banker
- Paulus Roelof Cantz'laar (1771–1831), Dutch naval officer and colonial governor
- Roelof Dednam (born 1985), male badminton player from South Africa
- Roelof Diodati (1658–1723), governor of Dutch Mauritius in the late 17th century
- Roelof Frankot (1911–1984), Dutch painter
- Roelof Hordijk (1917–1979), Dutch fencer
- Roelof Huysmann (1444–1485), pre-Erasmian humanist of the northern Low Countries
- Roelof Klein (1877–1960), Dutch rower who competed at the 1900 Summer Olympics in Paris
- Roelof Koets (1592–1654), Dutch Golden Age painter
- Roelof Koets (Zwolle) (1655–1725), 18th-century painter from the Northern Netherlands
- Roelof Koops (1909–2008), Dutch speed skater who competed in the 1936 Winter Olympics
- Roelof Kranenburg (1880–1956), Dutch politician, lawyer and professor of state law
- Roelof Kruisinga (1922–2012), Dutch physician and politician
- Roelof van Laar (born 1981), Dutch politician
- Roelof van Lennep (1876–1951), Dutch male tennis player
- Roelof de Man (1634–1663), Dutch colonial administrator in South Africa
- Roelof van der Merwe (born 1984), South African cricketer
- Roelof Nelissen (1931–2019), retired Dutch politician of the defunct Catholic People's Party
- Roelof Smit (born 1993), South African rugby union player
- Roelof Jansz van Vries (1631–1681), Dutch Golden Age painter
- Roelof Wunderink (born 1948), Dutch former racing driver

== See also ==
- Roelofs
- Rolf
- Roel
