= Roeland =

Roeland, Roelandt or Roelant (all pronounced /rulɑnt/) is a Dutch masculine given name equivalent to English Roland. It is a Germanic name consisting of the elements -hrod- ("fame") and -land- (i.e. "famous in the land") or -nand- ("brave"). A common short form is Roel. People with the name include:

- Roeland van Duijn (born 1943), Dutch politician, political activist and writer
- Roeland Kerbosch (born 1940), Dutch movie director
- Roeland van Laer (1598 – aft. 1635), Dutch landscape painter
- Roeland Lievens (born 1983), Dutch rower
- Roeland van der Marel (born 1967), Dutch astronomer, NASA space telescope project leader
- Roeland Nusse (born 1950), Dutch developmental biologist
- Roelant Oltmans (born 1954), Dutch hockey coach
- Roeland Paardekooper (born 1970), Dutch archaeologist
- Roeland Pruijssers (born 1989), Dutch chess grandmaster
- Roeland Raes (born 1934), Belgian politician
- Roelant Roghman (1627–1692), Dutch painter, sketcher and engraver
- Roelant Savery (1576–1639), Dutch still life and bird painter
- Roeland Schaftenaar (born 1988), Dutch basketball player
- Roeland J. in 't Veld (born 1942), Dutch public administration scholar
- Roeland Vertegaal (born 1968), Dutch-Canadian computer interface designer
- Roeland Wiesnekker (born 1967), Swiss actor

== See also ==
- Roeland Park, town in Kansas, US named after John Roe (Roe-land)
- Roland (disambiguation)
- Rowland (disambiguation)
