= Roelandts =

Roelandts is a Dutch patronymic surname ("Roeland's"). Closely similar forms of the name are Roeland, Roelands, Roelandse, Roelandt, Roelans, Roelant, and Roelants. Notable people with these surnames include:

Roeland

- Joop Roeland (1931–2010), Dutch Catholic priest in Austria

Roelandt

- Danny Roelandt (born 1955), Belgian sprinter
- Louis Roelandt (1786–1864), Flemish architect

Roelandts

- Jürgen Roelandts (born 1985), Belgian road cyclist
- Kevin Roelandts (born 1982), Belgian footballer, currently playing for Zulte-Waregem

Roelants

- Astrid Roelants, Belgian singer-songwriter of Tunisian origin better known as Ameerah
- François Roelants du Vivier (born 1947), Belgian FDF politician
- Gaston Roelants (born 1937), Belgian steeplechaser and cross country runner
- Maurice Roelants (1895–1966), Flemish novelist and poet

== See also ==
- Roeland, a Dutch masculine given name
