= Deodat del Monte =

Flemish painter, architect, astronomer (1582–1644)

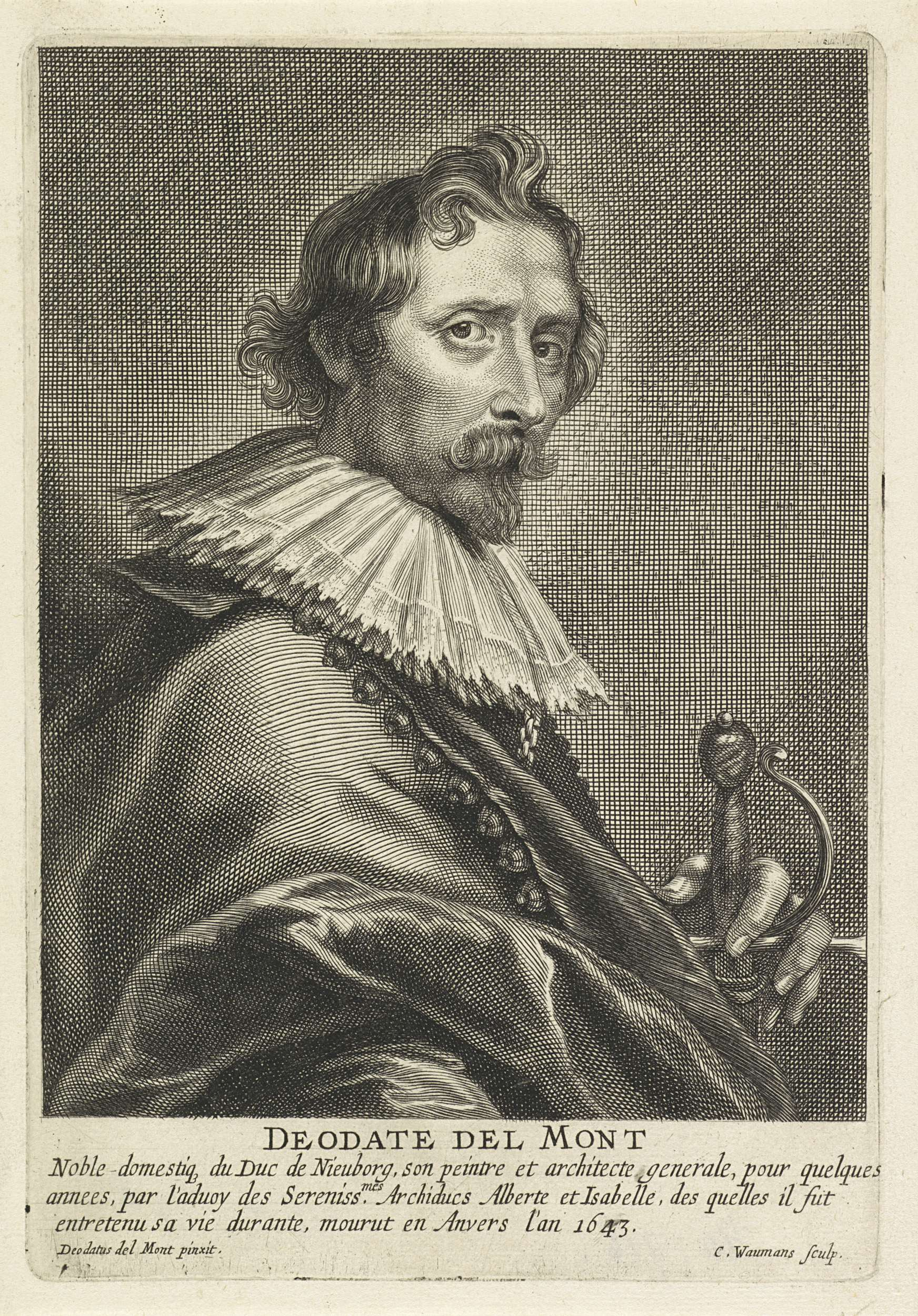
- Born: 1582, Sint-Truiden
- Died: 24 November 1644, Antwerp
- Known for: Painting, Architecture, Astronomy

Deodat del Monte, Deodat van der Mont or Deodatus Delmont (baptized 24 September 1582, in Sint-Truiden – 24 November 1644, in Antwerp) was a Baroque painter, architect, engineer, astronomer, and art dealer who was part of the inner circle of Peter Paul Rubens. He worked for ruling princes in Germany, the Spanish Netherlands and Spain and was knighted.

== Life ==
Deodat van der Mont was born on or shortly before 24 September 1582 (the date of his baptism) in Sint-Truiden. His parents were Guilliam van Dermonde (Ghuilliam van der Mont or vander Monden), a goldsmith and type caster, and Margriet Pruynen. His family was influential locally but was not a part of the aristocracy as some sources have assumed. His father moved the family to Antwerp in 1587 or 1590 after he was forced to leave Sint-Truiden in the Prince-Bishopric of Liège due to accusations of money forgery.

Del Monte's life is closely connected to that of Rubens. According to contemporary witnesses, del Monte and Rubens were best friends from an early age. Del Monte would also have been his earliest pupil, at least in the area of painting. It is believed that he became a pupil of Rubens between 1598 (the year in which Rubens became a master) and 1600. He possibly studied under another master before becoming Rubens' pupil.

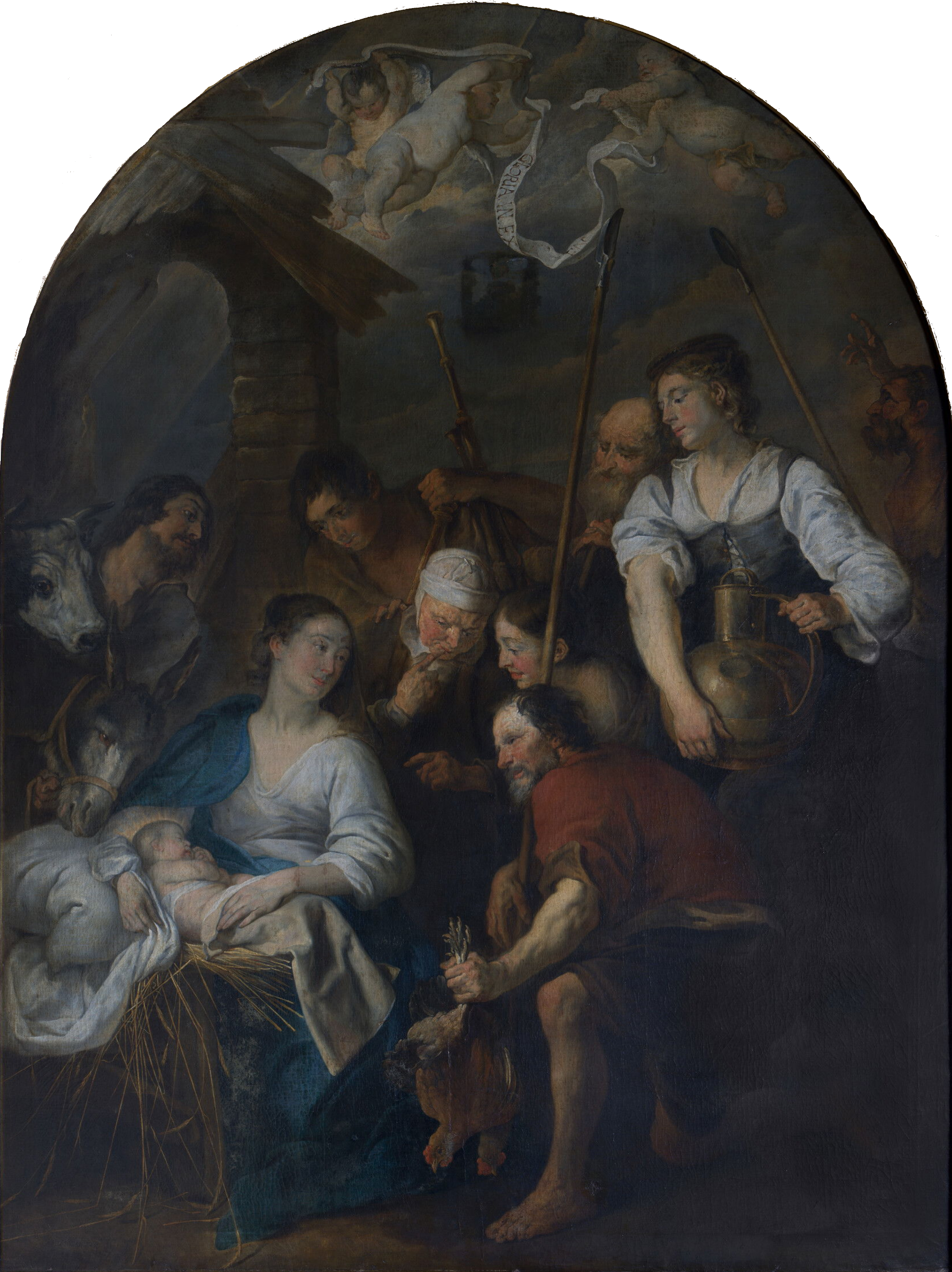
The Adoration of the Shepherds, a collaboration with Jan Cossiers

Del Monte travelled with Rubens to Italy in 1600, according to some sources in Rubens' service while others state that they travelled as best friends. The pair travelled over the Rhine, via Strasbourg, Basel and Schaffhausen, over the Alps and probably entered Italy by way of the Gotthard Pass. Del Monte stayed with Rubens during his service as court painter in Mantua and his residences in Rome. During this period they became acquainted with the scientist Galileo Galilei. The pair were together in Italy most of the time for a period of 8 years. This is evidenced by del Monte's witnessing in 1608 of a contract between Rubens and the Oratorians for the execution of an altarpiece for the San Filippo Neri church in Ferro, Italy.

Immediately upon his return to Antwerp with Rubens in 1608, del Monte was registered as a 'wijnmeester' ('wine master') of the local Guild of St Luke. This was a title reserved for the sons of members of the Guild. His father had been admitted as a member of the Guild in 1593. Del Monte joined in 1609 the 'sodaliteit der bejaerde jongmans', a fraternity for older bachelors established by the Jesuit order in Antwerp. He served as the 'consultor' of the fraternity in December 1609, 1610 and 1614. He worked as a painter and is recorded as having a workshop with two pupils in 1610. His earliest commission was for a triptych for the main altar of the Saint Benedict Church in Mortsel. This work was completed in 1612 but was later replaced by a work by Anton Goubau and is now lost.

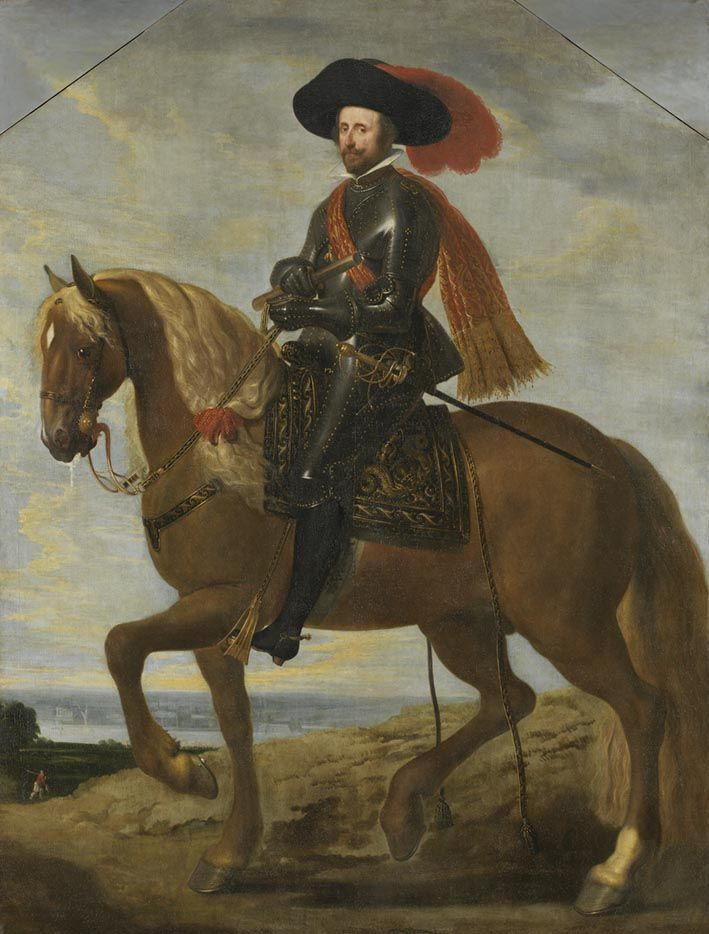
Equestrian portrait of Wolfgang Wilhelm von Pfalz-Neuburg

Del Monte married Geertruyt (Gertrudis) van den Berghe on 26 October 1614. The couple had three sons. The family remained close to the Rubens family. Rubens' first wife was the godmother of del Monte's youngest son. Del Monte bought on 31 March 1620 a house called De Roosen Hoed (now on Prinsstraat 2) which remained his Antwerp residence until his death. The early biographer Cornelis de Bie asserts in his book Het Gulden Cabinet published in 1662 that del Monte was in the service of Wolfgang Wilhelm, Count Palatine of Neuburg for some time. Some historians place this period of service in the 1610s. This is unlikely since during this time there are ample records of del Monte's presence in Antwerp. It is, however, likely that del Monte was in Wolfgang Wilhelm's service since the Count Palatine knighted him in 1626 and allowed him to have a coat-of-arms.

It is further believed that he entered the service of the then governors of the Spanish Netherlands, the Archdukes Albert and Isabella. He also worked as an architect and military engineer for King Philip III of Spain. The King granted him several privileges that were threatened in his later years. Cornelis de Bie alleged that the king's son Philip IV of Spain intervened on Del Monte's behalf with his brother Cardinal-Infante Ferdinand of Austria, who at the time was the governor of the Habsburg Netherlands, and his privileges were restored.

In his later years del Monte's financial situation deteriorated, probably because he was no longer able to work due to illness. He died in November 1644 and buried on 27 November 1644 in the Saint James Church in Antwerp. According to Cornelis de Bie he had long predicted from the stars that he would die in his 63rd year, a feat he was likely held to be capable of since he was an astronomer.

Del Monte's pupils included Boudewyn Claessen (1610), Thomas Morren (1610), Thomas van Bemelen (1621–22), Jakus Adriaenssen (1622–23), van den Berch (1623–24) and Martin Goes (1625–26).

== Work ==
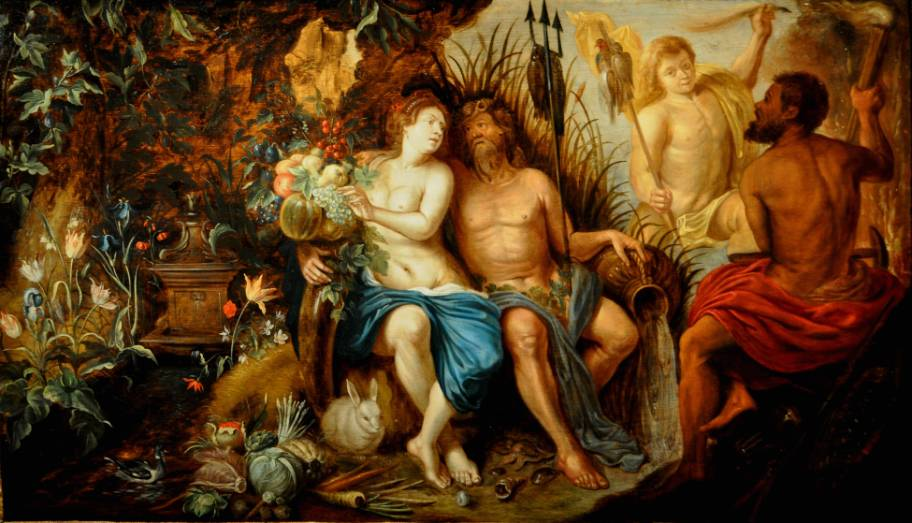
The four elements

There is little information about del Monte's painterly oeuvre as only a few signed works have survived. He worked in de genres of history painting and portrait painting. In 1610 he made an altarpiece for the St Benedict church of Mortsel, which is lost. In 1614 he painted a Transfiguration for the Antwerp Cathedral which is now in the Royal Museum of Fine Arts Antwerp. There is a signed The Descent from the Cross (1623) in the Onze-Lieve-Vrouw Hemelvaart Church in Munsterbilzen. These works show the classical plasticity that characterise the works that Rubens painted between 1612 and 1618.

An Adoration of the Magi and a Transfiguration in the collection of the (Royal Museum of Fine Arts Antwerp) formerly attributed to del Monte appear to have been re-attributed to Artus Wolffort, another Antwerp artist in the Rubens circle.

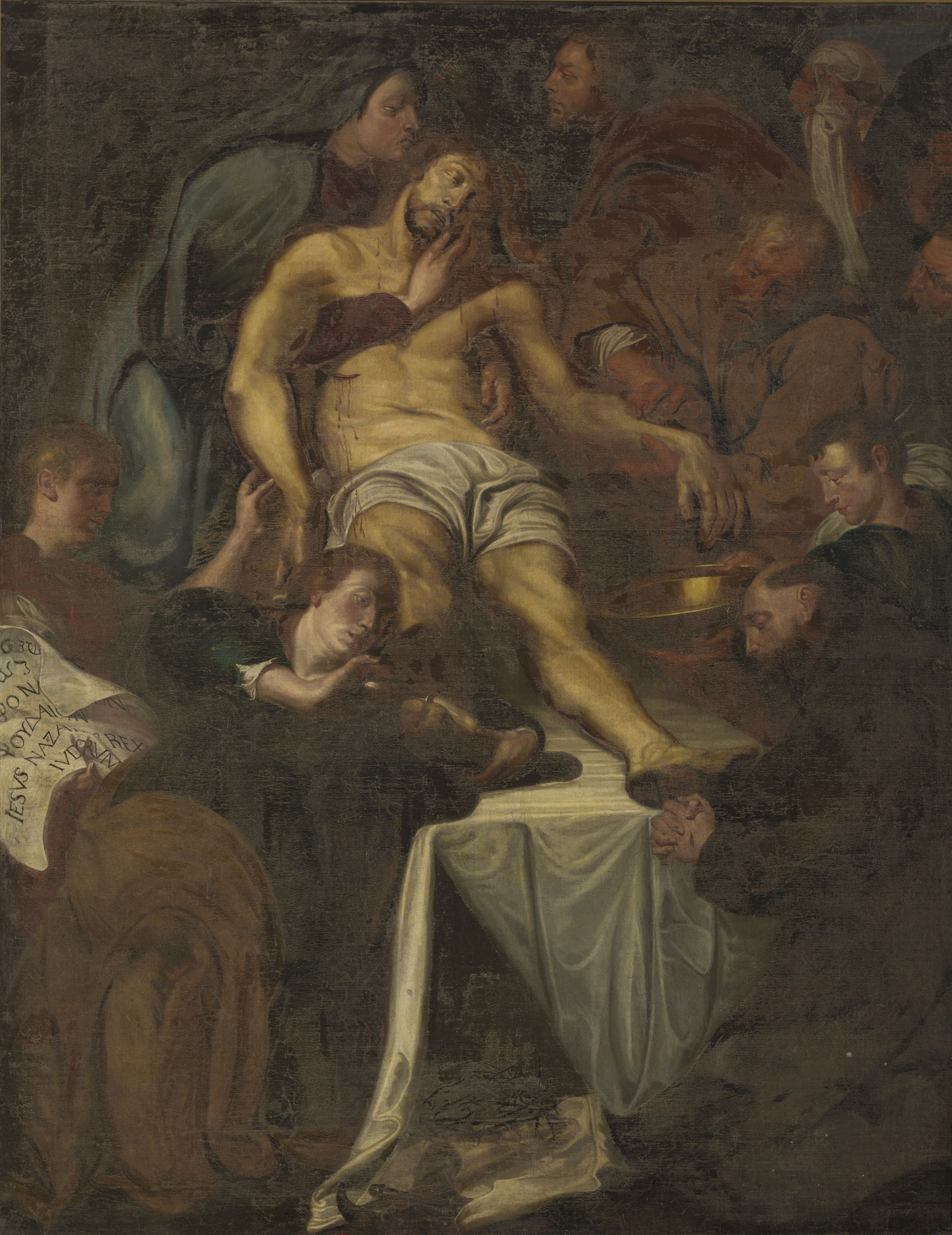
Lamentation with Saint Francis of Assisi

Other attributions to del Monte include a painting on The four elements (sold at Jean Moust) dated 1644, which must then have been painted in the year he was ill and died. The still life in the composition is attributed to Osias Beert the Younger. Another collaborative work is the fully signed and dated Adoration of the Shepherds painted together with Antwerp artist Jan Cossiers in 1643 (M – Museum Leuven). A Triumph of Bacchus was attributed to del Monte when auctioned by Dorotheum in 2000 but to Simon de Vos when auctioned by the same auction house in 2002.

A drawing entitled the Lamentation with Saint Francis of Assisi (former title: Anointing the Dead Christ) in the Fogg Museum has been attributed to del Monte. It is a preparatory drawing for a painting by del Monte (signed and dated 1623) in the Onze-Lieve-Vrouw Tenhemelopnemingskerk (Church Our Lady of the Assumption) in Munsterbilzen, Belgium. Del Monte's Lamentation is clearly inspired by Rubens' Holy Trinity altarpiece or around 1620 (painted for the Church of the Calced Carmelites but now in the Royal Museum for Fine Arts, Antwerp) in its use of foreshortening in the body of Christ and the classicising style.

It is assumed that del Monte who was active as an architect assisted Rubens in his architectural designs and publications.
