= Roel Stoffels =

Dutch footballer

Personal information
- Date of birth: 10 January 1987 (age 39)
- Place of birth: Leidschendam, Netherlands
- Height: 1.89 m (6 ft 2 1/2 in)
- Position: Midfielder

Senior career*
Years	Team	Apps	(Gls)
2007–2009	ADO Den Haag	14	(0)
2010–2013	Haaglandia	82	(11)
2013–2015	Excelsior Maassluis	49	(2)
- * Club domestic league appearances and goals as of 17:56, 31 March 2014 (UTC)

Roel Stoffels (born 10 January 1987) is a Dutch former professional footballer.

== Career ==
Born in Leidschendam, Stoffels signed a two-year contract with ADO Den Haag in September 2007. He made 14 appearances for them in the Eerste Divisie during the 2007–08 season, before being released by the club in March 2009. He later played in the Topklasse for Haaglandia and Excelsior Maassluis.
