= Roelof Koets =

Dutch painter

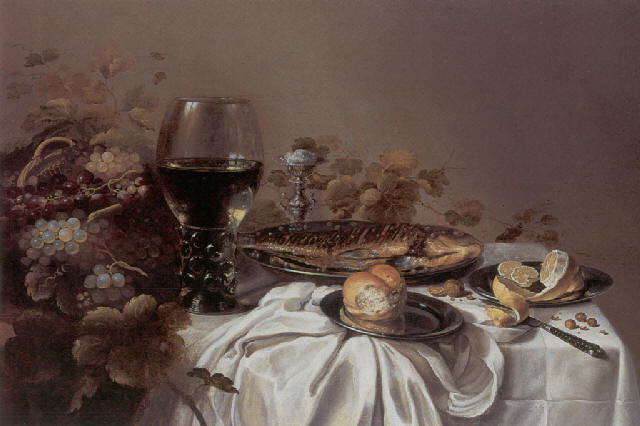
Still life of a fish, bread, a peeled lemon, grapes in a basket, a salt and roemer, all on a draped table, by Roelof Koets (the elder)

Roelof Koets (1592, Haarlem – 1654, Haarlem) was a Dutch Golden Age painter.

== Biography ==
Koets became a member of the Haarlem Guild of St. Luke in 1654 as a vinder. He collaborated with Haarlem still life painters Pieter Claesz and Jan Jansz van de Velde. He himself was influenced by Floris van Dyck and in turn influenced Floris van Schooten. He became the teacher of his son, the later painter Andries Koets. He is not to be confused with the later painter Roelof Koets of Zwolle, who painted mostly portraits.
