= Roelofs =

Roelofs is a Dutch language patronymic surname. The common Dutch given name Roelof is equivalent to Rudolph. People with this surname include:

- Al Roelofs (1906–1990), Dutch-born American art director
- Albert Roelofs (1877–1920), Dutch painter, son of Willem
- Annemarie Roelofs (born 1955), Dutch trombone player and violinist
- Arjen Roelofs (1754–1828), Dutch astronomer
- Garritt Roelofs (1900–1976), American politician
- Ingeborg Roelofs (born 1983), Dutch handball player
- Jan Roelofs (born 1985), Dutch motorcycle racer
- Joris Roelofs (born 1984), Dutch jazz saxophonist, clarinetist, and flutist
- Justin Roelofs, American musician
- Karl Roelofs (born 1964), American video game developer
- Ramon Roelofs (born 1968), Dutch DJ
- Sandra Roelofs (born 1968), Dutch linguist and the First Lady of Georgia from 2004 to 2013
- Wendell L. Roelofs (born 1938), American organic chemist
- Willem Roelofs (1822–1897), Dutch painter

A less common spelling is Roeloffs:

- Eleanor Roeloffs (born 1940), American political reporter
- Hugo Roeloffs (1844–1928), Syndicus of Hamburg

== See also ==
- Roelof
- Roelofsen, Dutch surname of the same origin
