= Roelof Koets (Zwolle) =

Dutch painter

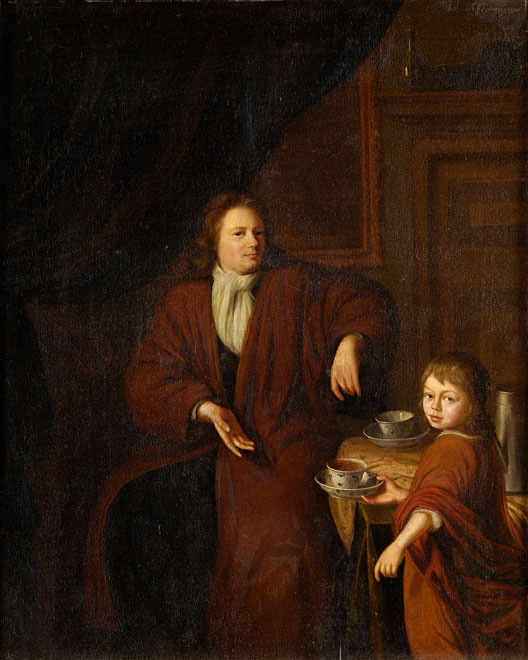
Boy Brings his Father a Cup of Coffee

Roelof Koets, or Coets (1655–1725), was an 18th-century painter from the Dutch Republic.

== Biography ==
He was born in Zwolle as the son of Andries Koets and is known as a portrait painter and the teacher of the miniature painter Herman Wolters, the husband of Henriëtta van Pee. According to his biographer Johan van Gool, he had been a pupil of Gerard ter Borch and painted upwards of 5000 portraits of various gentry in Friesland and Overijssel, including portraits of the family of Hendrik Casimir. Though sometimes still life paintings are attributed to him, most of these are by an earlier Roelof Koets, who could possibly have been his descendant. He died in Zwolle.
