= Floris van Schooten =

Dutch painter

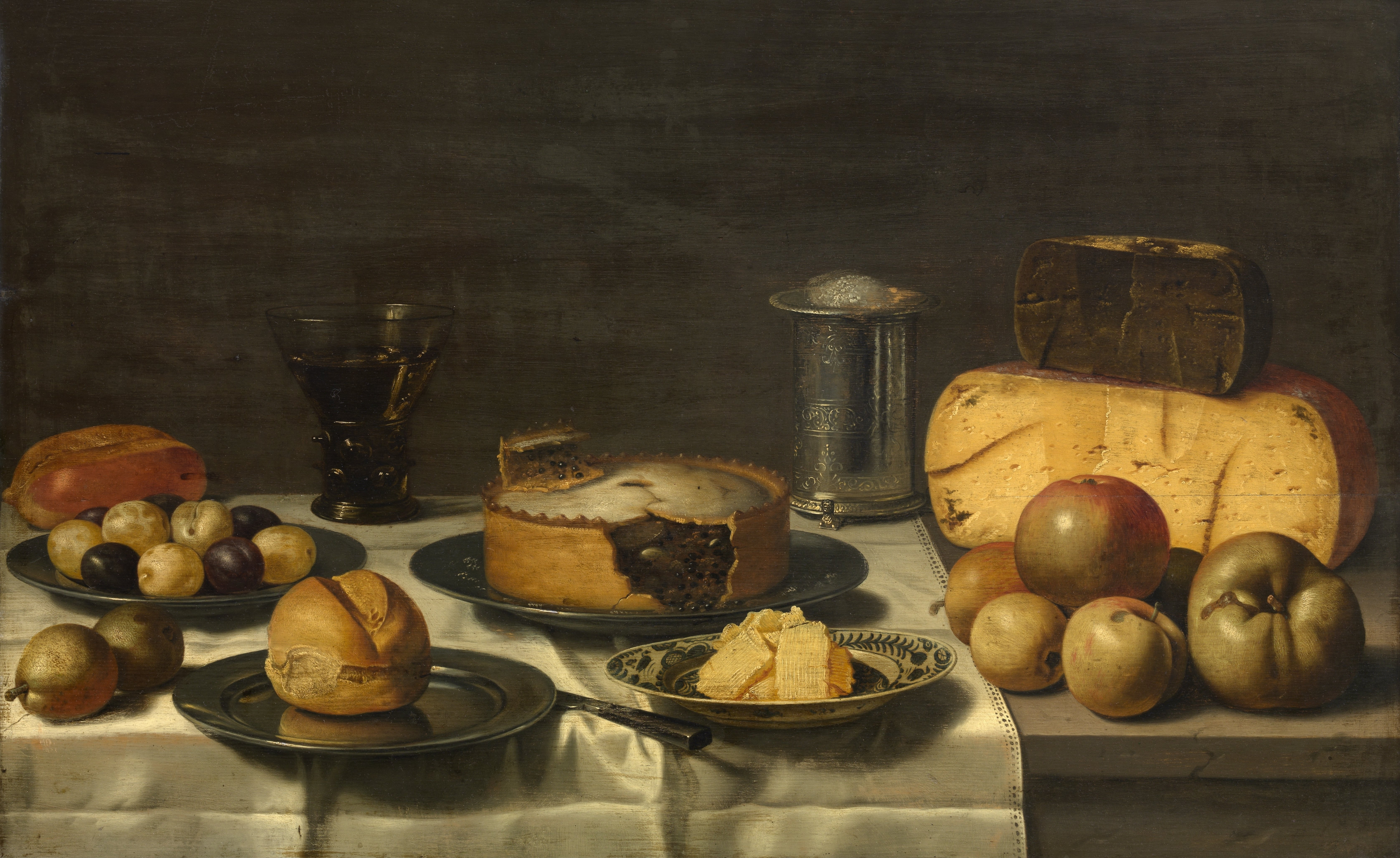
Dutch breakfast

Floris Gerritsz van Schooten or Floris van Schooten (between 1585 and 1588 – buried 14 November 1656) was a Dutch painter who practised in a broad range of still life genres including breakfast pieces, fruit pieces, market scenes and large kitchen pieces.

== Life ==
Floris van Schooten was the son of Gerrit Jacbsz van Schooten, a member of a prosperous Catholic family from Amsterdam, who had moved to Haarlem in 1612. At that time, many Catholic families left Amsterdam, where the Protestants had the upper hand in local government, for Haarlem, where the climate for Catholicism was more tolerant.

The young van Schooten became a member of the Haarlem Guild of St. Luke. He served as the dean of the Guild of Saint Luke in 1639.

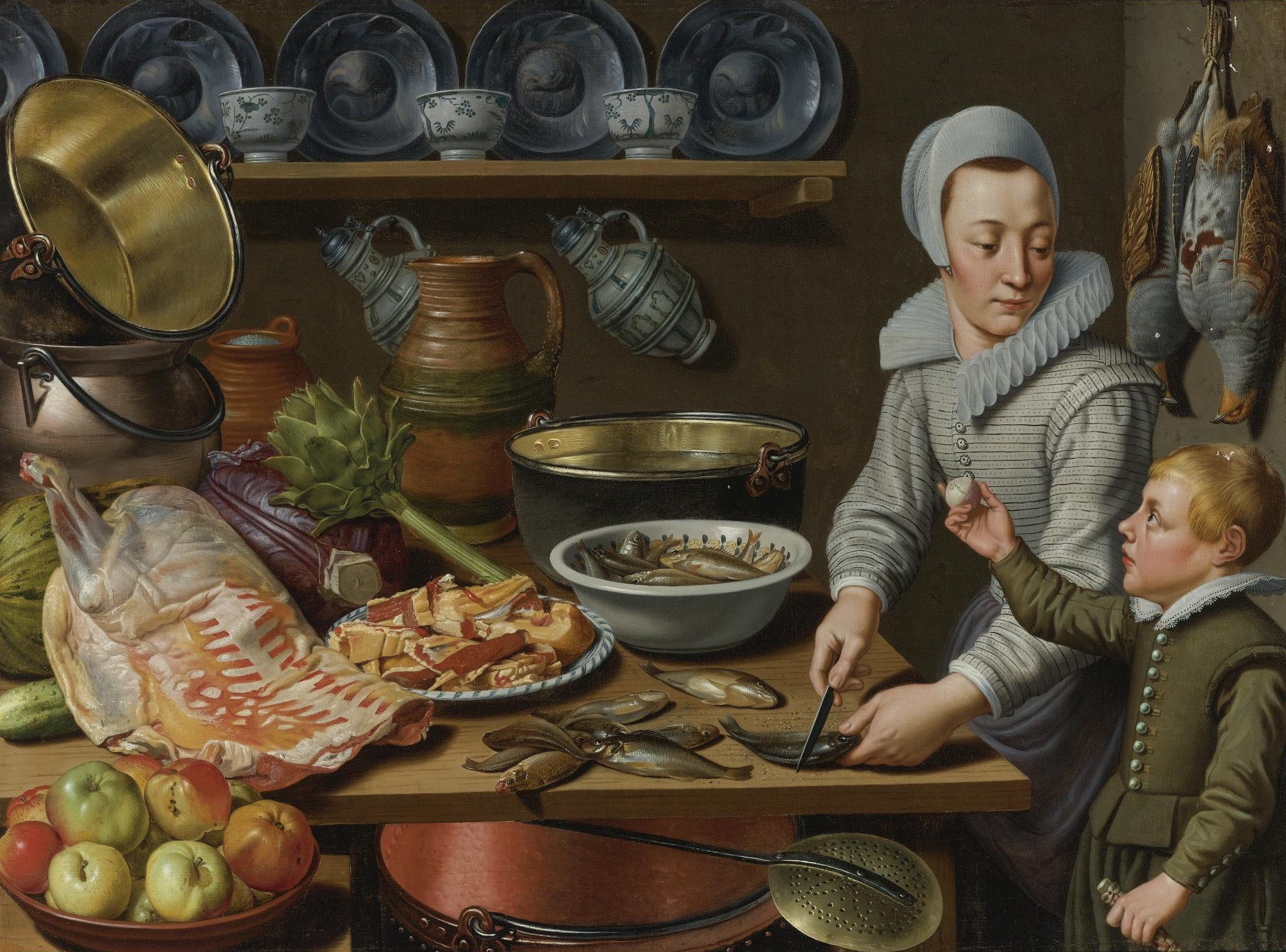
Kitchen scene

In 1612, he married the daughter of the most prosperous local beer brewer, Rycklant Bol van Zanen. Together, they had three daughters and a son, Johannes, who also became a painter. Floris van Schooten is mentioned as a member of the city's Corporation in 1641.

He died in Haarlem, where he was buried on 14 November 1656 in the Grote Kerk.

== Work ==
About 120 works are attributed to Floris van Schooten. The Dutch art historian Abraham Bredius attributed the works of the monogrammist "F.v.S" or "FVS" to Floris van Schooten in 1918. There is only one fully signed work known by van Schooten, a breakfast still life, which is now in the Von der Heydt Museum of Wuppertal in Germany. There are over 60 monogrammed paintings known and an even larger number which are unsigned, but are securely attributed to him.

Floris van Schooten painted in various still life genres, including breakfast pieces, fruit pieces, market scenes and large kitchen pieces. He was not an innovator himself, but reflected in his works promptly the innovations that occurred in the local still life scene. His oeuvre thus bears testimony to the historic development of still life painting in the Netherlands. His works show the influence of his contemporaries in the Haarlem guild, Floris van Dyck, Pieter Claesz., and Roelof Koets. His work also shows familiarity with the work of the painters Pieter Aertsen and Joachim Beuckelaer, who in the preceding century had created in Antwerp large-scale market scenes incorporating still lifes. Floris van Schooten simplified the format of these predecessors, thus creating a greater sense of order and stability.

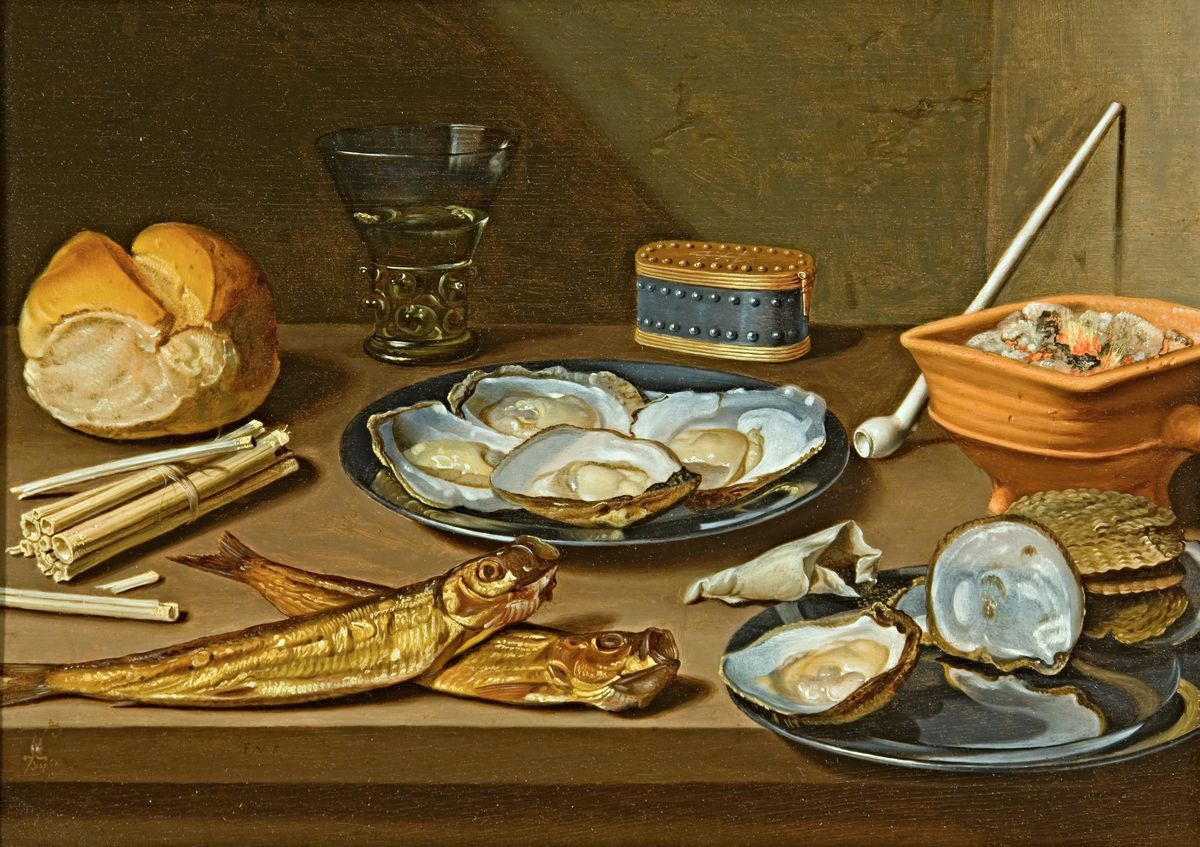
Still life with herrings, oysters and smoking paraphernalia

He painted many still lifes featuring his recurrent favourite motifs of ham and cheese. He influenced Jacob Samuel Beck, François Garnier, Hans van Sant, and the Monogrammist "VS.Z".
