= Roel Nusse =

Dutch biologist

Roeland "Roel" Nusse
- Born: 9 June 1950 (age 76); Amsterdam
- Education: University of Amsterdam, University of California, San Francisco
- Scientific career
- Workplaces: Stanford University
- Academic advisors: Harold Varmus

Roeland "Roel" Nusse (born 9 June 1950, Amsterdam) is a professor at Stanford University and an investigator at the Howard Hughes Medical Institute. His research was seminal in the discovery of Wnt signaling, a family of pleiotropic regulators involved in development and disease.

== Research ==
Nusse received his BSc in biology and his PhD from the University of Amsterdam. Nusse did a postdoctoral fellowship under the guidance of Harold Varmus at the University of California, San Francisco. In 1982, Nusse and Varmus discovered the Wnt1 gene.

After his postdoctoral fellowship, Nusse joined the Netherlands Cancer Institute expanding on the earlier work on the Wnt pathway and identifying the pathway in fruit flies. In 1990, he joined the department of Developmental Biology at Stanford University. His lab is currently focused on the role of Wnt in stem cell development and tissue repair.

== Awards ==
Nusse received the Peter Debye Prize from the University of Maastricht in 2000. He is a member of the U.S. National Academy of Sciences, European Molecular Biology Organization, and the Royal Netherlands Academy of Arts and Sciences (since 1997). He is a fellow of the American Academy of Arts and Sciences. He won a Breakthrough Prize in 2017. In 2020 he received the Canada Gairdner International Award.
