= Osias Beert =

Flemish painter (c.1580–1623)

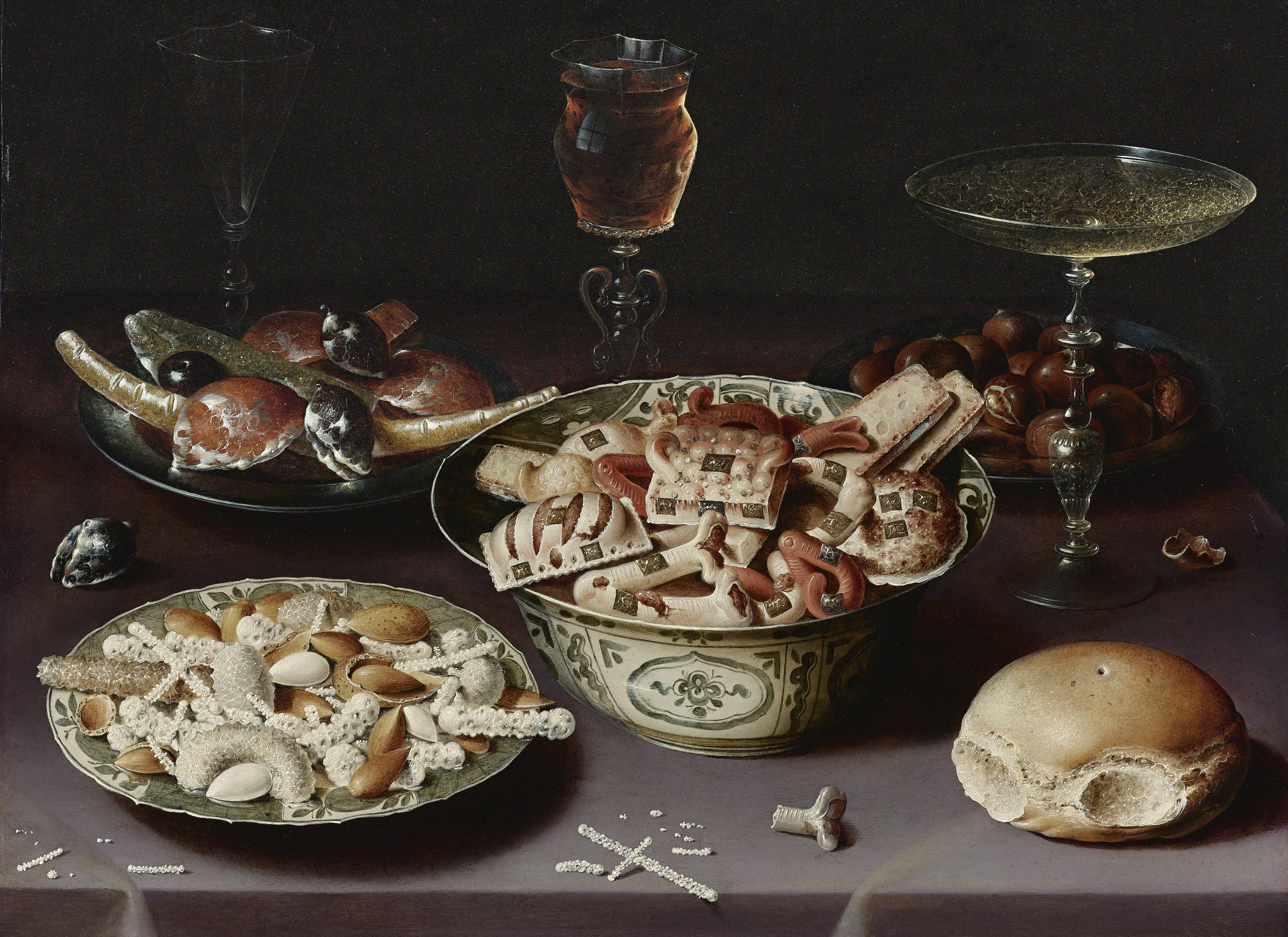
Still life of porcelain vessels and pewter plates with sweets and chestnuts

Osias Beert or Osias Beert the Elder (c. 1580 – 1623) was a Flemish painter active in Antwerp who played an important role in the early development of flower and "breakfast"-type still lifes as independent genres in Northern European art. He has been recognized as one of the most influential artists of the earliest generation of still life painters in Flanders. He contributed in particular to the development of still lifes placed on table tops featuring festive culinary delights as well as of sumptuous floral bouquets, typically displayed in Wan Li vases.

== Life ==
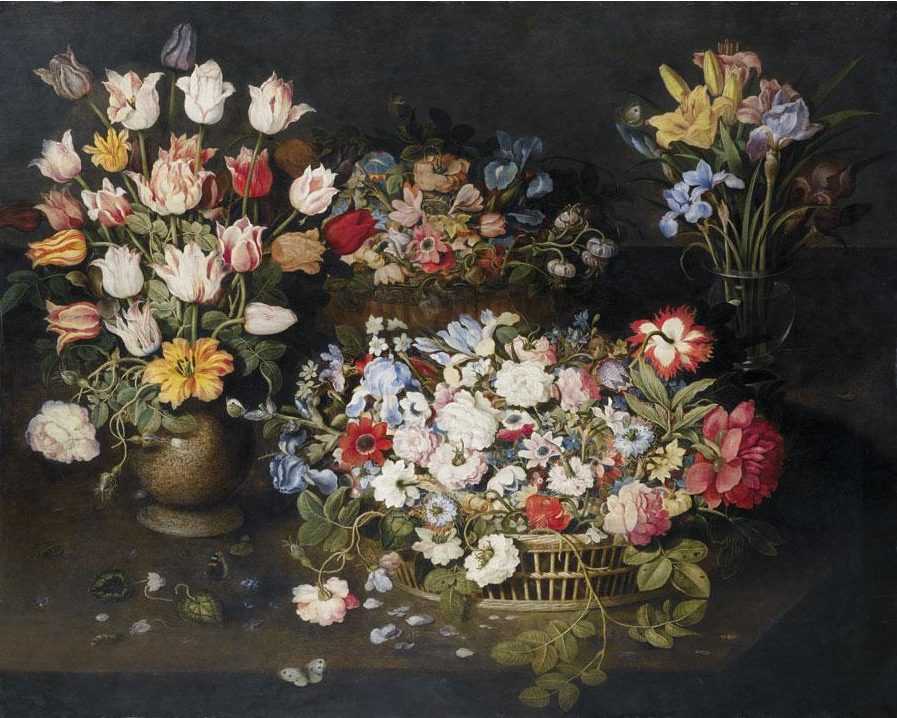
Still life of flowers in a stoneware vase, a glass vase and a wicker basket

Little is known about this artist's early life. It is believed that he was born in Antwerp or possibly Kortrijk around 1580. His family was established in Antwerp by 1582. Here he studied under the little-known Andries van Baesrode (or 'van Baseroo'). He joined the city's Guild of St. Luke in 1602.

He married Margriet (or Margarita) Ykens on 8 January 1606. in 1622 the couple had a son, Osias Beert the younger, who became a master of the guild of St. Luke in 1645. Osias Beert the younger, as well as the students of Osias Beert the Elder, are probably responsible for the many replicas and variant versions of Beert the Elder's compositions that still exist today. Osias Beert the Younger is unlikely to have studied under his father since his father is believed to have died when the son was very young. Margriet Ykens was the aunt of Frans Ykens.

Beert was not only a painter but also traded as a cork merchant. The fact that he had a second occupation suggests that he did not gain a high income from his artistic work. He lived in the Schipperskwartier (shipper's district), a modest district of Antwerp. After his death, his widow Margriet Ykens had to sell the couple's furniture and paintings to pay a debt to the painter David Rijckaert II who had lent money to them to open their business. Beert was also a member of one of the local Chambers of rhetoric, which suggests he was involved in intellectual pursuits other than painting. He is believed to have died in Antwerp at the end of 1623.

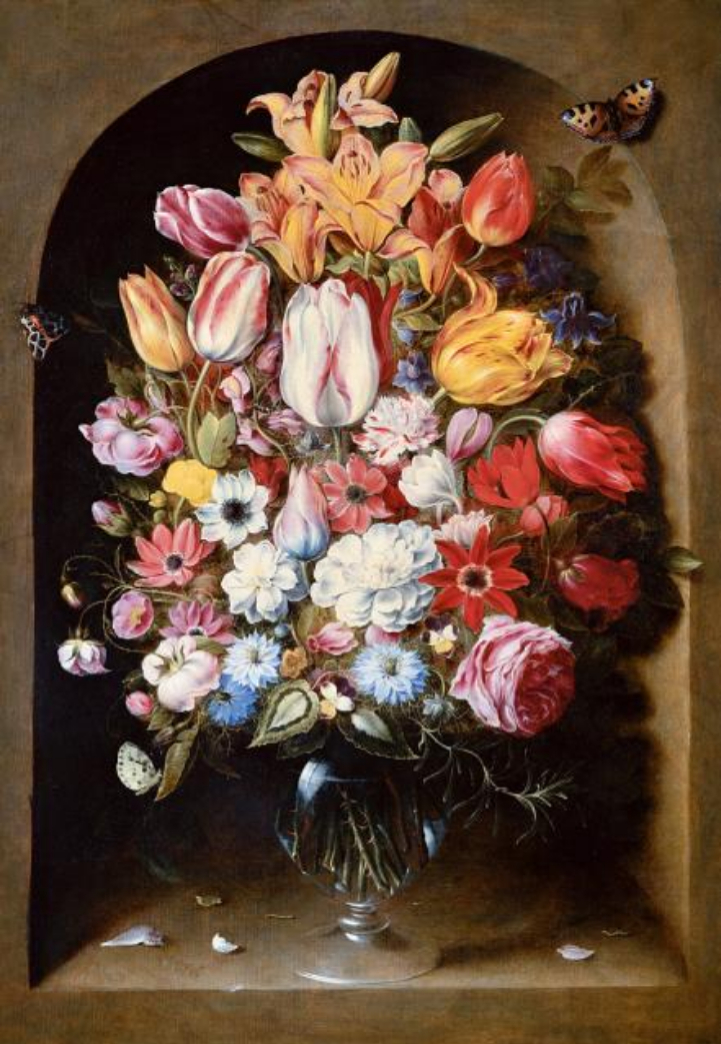
Bouquet in a niche

His pupils included Frans van der Borch, Frans Ykens (who was his nephew), Paulus Pontius and Jan Willemsen.

== Work ==
Osias Beert is mainly known as a painter of flowers and banquet (breakfast) pieces, genres in which he played a pioneering role. He rarely signed or monogrammed and never dated his work. Of his works created on copper three bear the mark of the panel maker Pieter Stas and the dates 1607, 1608 and 1609. Even while a lack of dated works has made it difficult to date his work, stylistic analysis allows a tentative chronology. The works with a high viewpoint and little overlapping of objects are regarded as earlier than those with a lower viewpoint and a compacter arrangement of objects. These later works also have a better spatial coherence.

Only four signed works by him are known and from these it has been possible to attribute four works in the Museum of Grenoble to him. Since knowledge about this early stage of the Flemish still life is still fragmentary there has been a tendency to attribute too many works to Beert. Some works attributed to him are likely by his pupils, while some attributed to Osias Beert the younger were probably painted by his father.

Osias Beert often painted on oak panels, using a glazing technique. By using multiple superimposed layers of very fluid oil he was able to obtain a transparency and a wide variety of colours. Some of his works are on copper.

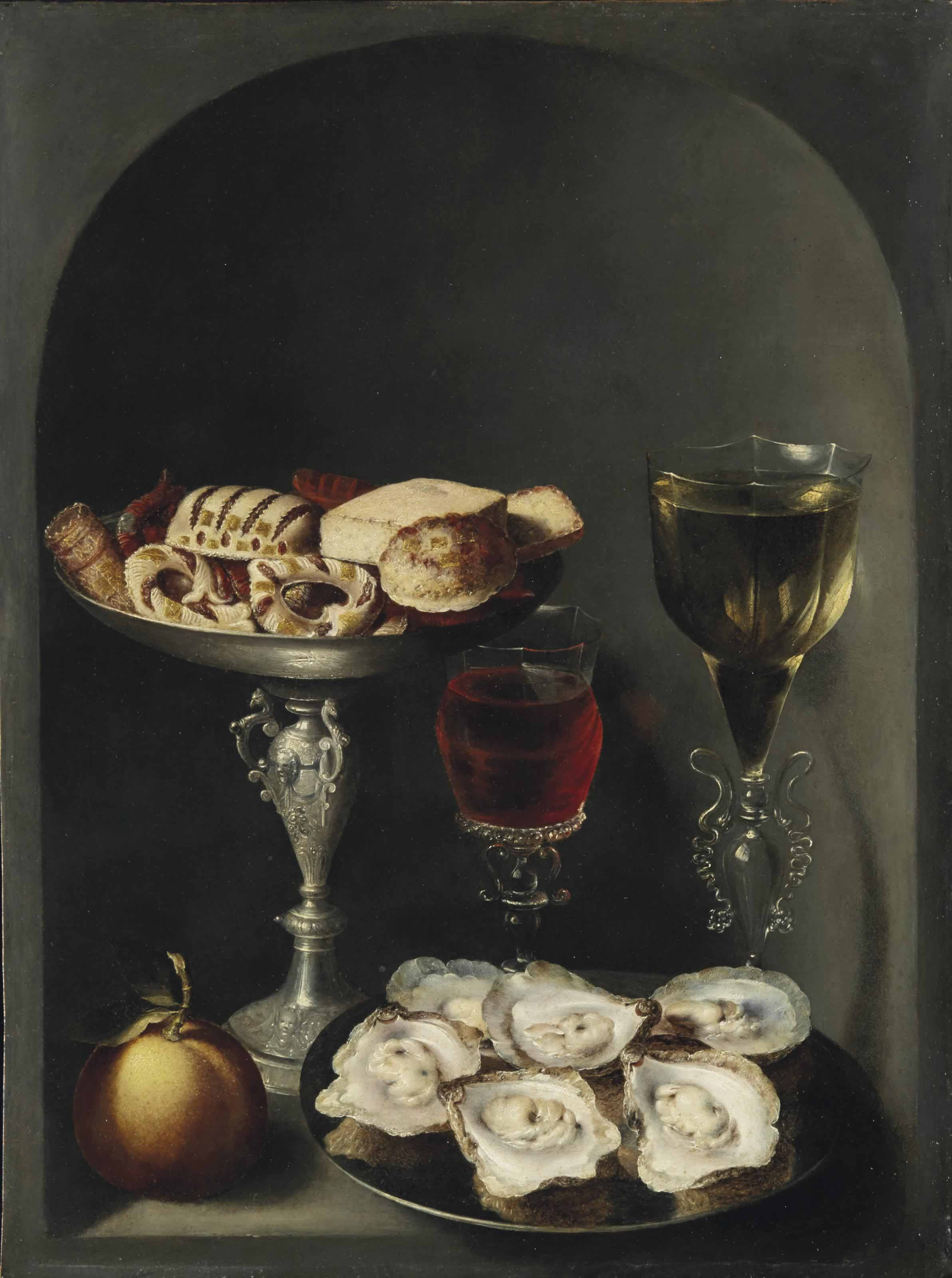
Still life with oysters on a pewter plate and wine glasses in a niche

He was one of the first artists to specialize in still life painting when the production of works in this genre was still minor and typically anonymous. His breakfast pieces, usually referred to by their Dutch name ontbijtjes ("little breakfasts"), represent the scene from a high viewpoint with a forced perspective.

This technique is commonly seen in early Flemish and Dutch still life painting. His compositions often show dense groupings in a balanced arrangement. His style is quasi-geometric and shows an eye for detail.

He strived for objectivity and displayed a strong sense of plasticity. His still lifes are bathed in an even and diffused light. An example is Still life with cherries and strawberries in China bowls (Gemäldegalerie, Berlin), which shows a banquet piece on a table that is slightly tilted so that the objects on it can be viewed without obstruction. The painting represents the last course of an eight to nine course banquet. The dragonfly and the butterfly have an emblematic meaning and represent the fight between good and evil.

He was known for his paintings of oysters and confectionery goods displayed orderly on tabletops together with precious wine glasses and Chinese porcelain. He was unmatched in his ability to depict oysters with light playing on the viscous and pearly flesh and the wetness distinguishing the oysters from the hard surface of the shell's interior. A good example is the Still life with oysters (National Gallery of Art, Washington), which shows oysters on a plate together with precious objects on a table extending on both sides outside of the canvas against a dark background.

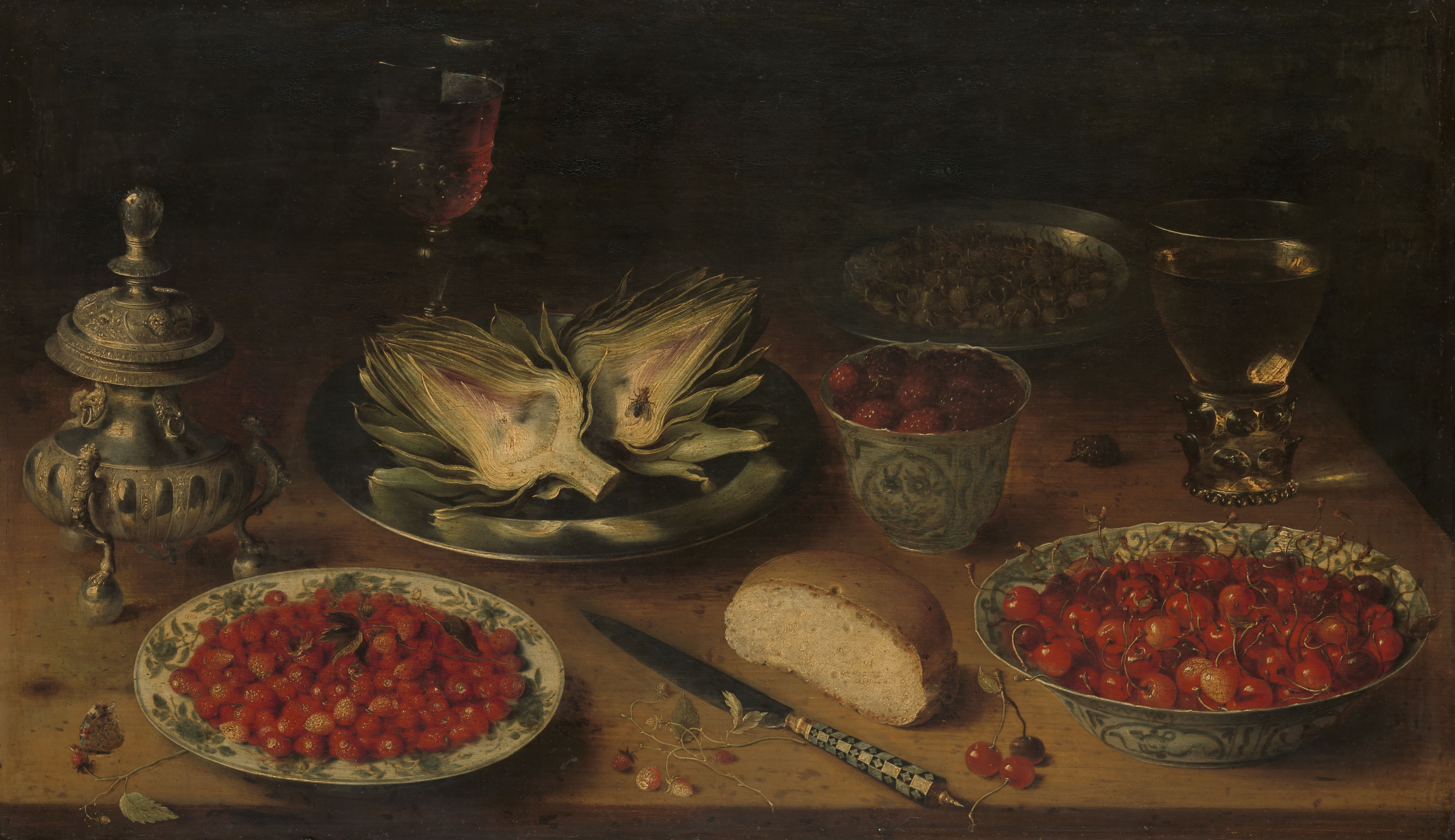
Breakfast still life

His flower still lifes, often showing a vase of flowers in a shallow niche or a basket full of flowers, as is visible in Basket of Flowers at the Museum of Fine Arts, Houston are reminiscent of the works of Ambrosius Bosschaert. In his flower pieces each flower is displayed at the peak of its bloom and with great detail. The flowers depicted in the same bouquet often bloomed in different seasons and could never in reality have been displayed in the same vase. As such they symbolize the transitory nature of man's earthly existence. An example is the Bouquet in a niche in the Rockox House, Antwerp.

He collaborated with Peter Paul Rubens on at least one painting, Pausias and Glycera (John and Mable Ringling Museum of Art). He influenced his nephew Frans Ykens as well as other Antwerp artists, such as Jacob Foppens van Es and Jacob van Hulsdonck.
