= Francken (surname) =

Francken is a Dutch patronymic surname, meaning "son of Frank". People with this name include:

- Christian Francken (c.1550–c.1611), German Jesuit writer
- Christoph Bernhard Francken or Francke (1670–1729), German military officer and painter
- Frank Francken (born 1964), Belgian racing cyclist
- Henry Andrew Francken (c.1720–1791), Dutch-born merchant and freemason in the West Indies
- Jacques Francken (1891–1949), Dutch footballer, brother of Mannes
- Mannes Francken (1888–1948), Dutch footballer, brother of Jacques
- Ruth Francken (1924–2006), Czech-American sculptor, painter, and furniture designer
- Theo Francken (born 1978), Belgian New Flemish Alliance politician
- The Francken family of Flemish painters:
  - Frans Francken the Elder (or Frans Francken I 1542–1616), his two sons:
    - Hieronymus Francken II, son of Frans I, brother of Frans II, Antwerp 1578–1623
    - Frans Francken the Younger (or Frans II, Antwerp, 1581–1642)
      - Frans Francken III, son of Frans II, 1607–1667
      - Hieronymus Francken III, son of Frans II, 1611–1671
        - Constantijn Francken, son of Hieronymus III, 1661–1717
  - Ambrosius Francken I, brother of Frans I, 1544–1618
  - Hieronymus Francken I, brother of Frans I, c. 1540–1610, mostly worked in France
    - Isabella Francken, probable daughter of Hieronymus I, active c.1600–1625

Fictitious

- Fritz Francken, pseudonym of Flemish writer Frederik Edward Clijmans (1893–1969)
- Jan Baptist Francken, non-existing member of the Flemish family of painters
- Sebastiaen Francken, name never used by the unrelated Flemish painter Sebastiaen Vrancx (1573–1647)

== See also ==
- Franken (surname), variant spelling of the same surname
- Franken (disambiguation), for other meanings
- Francke, German surname
