= Antwerp school =

The Antwerp School was a school of artists active in Antwerp, first during the 16th century when the city was the economic center of the Low Countries, and then during the 17th century when it became the artistic stronghold of the Flemish Baroque under Peter Paul Rubens.

== History ==
Antwerp took over from Bruges as the main trading and commercial center of the Low Countries around 1500. Painters, artists and craftsmen joined the Guild of Saint Luke, which educated apprentices and guaranteed quality.

The first school of artists that emerged in the city were the Antwerp Mannerists, a group of anonymous late Gothic painters active in the city from about 1500 to 1520. They were followed by Mannerist painters in the Italian tradition that developed at the end of the High Renaissance. Jan Gossaert was a major artist in the city at this time. Other artists, such as Frans Floris, continued this style.

The iconoclastic riots ('Beeldenstorm' in Dutch) of 1566 that preceded the Dutch Revolt resulted in the destruction of many works of religious art, after which time the churches and monasteries had to be refurnished and redecorated. Artists such as Otto van Veen and members of the Francken family, working in a late mannerist style, provided new religious decoration. It also marked a beginning of economic decline in the city, as the Scheldt river was blockaded by the Dutch Republic in 1585 diminishing trade.

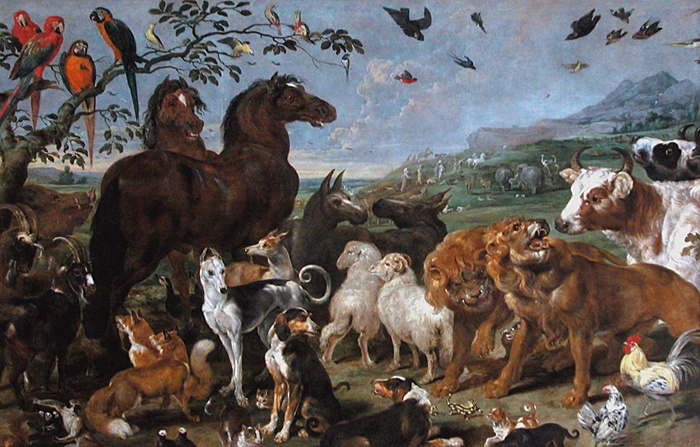
Paul de Vos, Noah's Ark; (Entry of the Animals into Noah’s Ark)

The city experienced an artistic renewal in the 17th century. The large workshops of Peter Paul Rubens and Jacob Jordaens, and the influence of Anthony van Dyck, made Antwerp the center of the Flemish Baroque. The city was an internationally significant publishing centre, and had a huge production of old master prints and book illustrations. Antwerp animaliers or animal painters, such as Frans Snyders, Jan Fyt and Paul de Vos dominated this speciality in Europe for at least the first half of the century. Many artists joined the Guild of Romanists, a society for which having visited Rome was a condition of membership. But as the economy continued to decline, and the Habsburg Governors and the Church reduced their patronage, many artists trained in Antwerp left for the Netherlands, England, France or elsewhere, and by the end of the 17th century Antwerp was no longer a major centre for art.

The artistic legacy of Antwerp is represented in many museums, and paintings of the Antwerp School are valued at auctions.

== Antwerp School Artists ==
=== Sixteenth century ===
- Pieter Aertsen
- Paul Bril
- Pieter Bruegel the Elder
- Joos van Cleve
- Gillis van Coninxloo
- Frans Floris
- Ambrosius Francken the Elder
- Frans Francken the Elder
- Hieronymus Francken the Elder
- Lucas de Heere
- Jan Sanders van Hemessen
- Jan Mandijn
- Jan Matsys
- Quentin Matsys
- Joos de Momper
- Jan Gossaert
- Adam van Noort
- Joachim Patinir
- Frans Pourbus the Elder
- Frans Pourbus the Younger
- Bartholomeus Spranger
- Otto van Veen
- Marten de Vos
- Sebastiaan Vranckx

=== Seventeenth century ===
- Hendrick van Balen the Elder
- Hendrick van Balen the Younger
- Pieter Boel
- Adriaen Brouwer
- Jan Brueghel the Elder
- Jan Brueghel the Younger
- Pieter Brueghel the Younger
- Gaspard de Crayer
- Abraham van Diepenbeeck
- Anthony van Dyck
- Frans Francken the Younger
- Jan Fyt
- Jacob Jordaens
- Erasmus Quellinus II
- Peter Paul Rubens
- Jan Siberechts
- Frans Snyders
- David Teniers the Younger
- Theodoor van Thulden
- Adriaen van Utrecht
- Cornelis de Vos
- Paul de Vos
- Jan Wildens
- Thomas Willeboirts Bosschaert
