= Hieronymus Francken =

Hieronymus Francken may refer to one of the following three Flemish artists from the same family:

- Hieronymus Francken I (ca. 1540–1610)
- Hieronymus Francken II (1578-1623)
- Hieronymus Francken III (1611– 1671)
