= Franken (surname) =

Franken is a German and/or Dutch patronymic surname, meaning "son of Frank". Origins being the Frankenwald (Franconian Forest) district in Germany most notably as the source of the surname. Notable people with the surname Franken include:

- Al Franken (born 1951), American politician, satirist, writer, and comedian
- Bernard Franken (1914–2001), Dutch racing cyclist
- Björn Franken (born 1983), Dutch record producer, songwriter, and DJ known as Vato Gonzalez
- Björn Franken (politician) (born 1979), German politician
- Bob Franken (born 1941), American journalist
- Bram Franken (born 2001), Dutch footballer
- Charlotte Franken (1894–1969), British feminist author
- Christian Franken / Francken (c. 1550–1610), German Jesuit and later Unitarian
- Giovanni Franken (born 1977), Dutch footballer
- Henk Franken (born 1987), Namibian rugby player
- Henry Franken (born 1966), Dutch engineer and enterprise architect
- Karin Franken, Dutch animal rights advocate working in Indonesia
- Lex Franken (born 1916, date of death unknown), Dutch water polo player
- Mannus Franken (1899–1953), Dutch filmmaker
- Marianna Franken (1928–2025), Dutch ceramicist
- Marianne Franken (1844–1945), Dutch painter
- Max Franken (fl. 1980s), Dutch rock drummer
- Michael Franken (born 1957), U.S. Navy vice admiral and politician
- Paul Franken (1894–1944), German Socialist politician
- Peter Franken (1928–1999), American physicist
- Rob Franken (1941–1983), Dutch jazz pianist and organist
- Rose Franken (1895–1988), American author and playwright
- Steve Franken (1932–2012), American actor
- Tony Franken (born 1965), Australian soccer goalkeeper
- Wallis Franken (1948–1996), American fashion model
- Wilhelm Franken (1914–1945), German U-boat commander
- Wim Franken (1922–2012), Dutch composer, pianist, and carillonneur

== See also ==
- Franken (disambiguation), for other meanings
- Francken (surname), variant spelling of the same surname
- Franke, German surname
