= Frenken =

Frenken is a German surname. Notable people with the surname include:

- Josef Frenken (1854–1943), German jurist and politician
- Miriam Frenken (born 1984), German sprint canoeist

== See also ==
- Franken (disambiguation)
- Frenkel
