= Franken =

Franken may refer to:

== Places ==
- Franken, Haut-Rhin, a commune of the Haut-Rhin département of France
- Franconia (wine region), or "Franken", one of the 13 wine regions of Germany
- Franconia, or "Franken", a region situated in northern Bavaria and adjacent parts of Baden-Württemberg and Thuringia, Germany

== People with the name ==
- Franken (surname), a Dutch patronymic surname
- The Francken family of Flemish painters is sometimes (rarely) written as "Franken"
- Franken Fran, a Japanese manga and a fictional character
- Franken Stein, a Japanese manga/anime fictional character

== Other uses ==
- Franken, an alternative name used in Germany for wine made from the Silvaner grape (Frankenriesling or Frankentraube)
- Franc, or "Franken", a currency unit, its German name (Switzerland, Liechtenstein, and formerly Belgium and Luxembourg)
- Franks, or "Franken", medieval Germanic tribes

== See also ==
- Francken (surname)
- Frank (disambiguation)
- Franke, surname
