= Herman van der Mast =

Dutch painter

- Born: c. 1550; Brielle
- Died: 9 January 1610; Delft

Herman van der Mast (c. 1550 – 1610) was a Dutch Renaissance painter from the Netherlands.

What little we know about Mast are the notes related by Karel van Mander in his Schilder-boeck, who mentioned him as part of a long list of pupils of Frans Floris. Mast was born in Brielle and was living in Delft when Van Mander was writing. After Frans Floris died he went to live with Frans Francken the Elder, who he served (along with other ex-Floris pupils) by copying works for production. While copying a painting by Floris there, namely a "cross-carrier" (eenen Cruys-drager van Floris), there was a hand holding a whitish cross, and while Mast was painting, a daddy long legs sat on the original, which Mast painted onto his copy very cleverly, including all the shadows. When his master came into the room, he said he could see he wasn't a very quick painter, because the spiders had time to shit on his work. Making a movement to brush it away with his hat, and seeing it wasn't moving but was painted, he became embarrassed and said that he shouldn't take it off but let it remain. The next day Mast showed it to his colleague Gortzius Geldorp and told him about what his master said, boasting "Zeuxis's birds! I fooled the Master with this creature!". Geldorp wouldn't believe him until he was told later to go look at the painting.

Van der Mast travelled to Paris where he lived for two years with the Archbishop of Bourges, for whom he painted a Saint Sebastian surrounded by all manner of herbs, that impressed the king's own personal physician. He then went to live with Monseur de la Queste, knight, president, en procureur-general of the King of France, for whom he worked for seven years. The last four years of which he was the personal assistant to his wife, who herself was a lady-in-waiting to the Queen. He was knighted by the King at the request of his mother at a masquerade ball held on Shrove Tuesday. Court life prevented him from painting. He is known for portraits and historical allegories, but only two portraits are known to be by him today. A painting in the Musée des Beaux-Arts de Rouen has long been attributed to him but this has been disputed.

In his work on Van Mander, Hessel Miedema was able to discover that Mast paid an admission fee for the Delft Guild of St. Luke in the year 1589 for 1587, and was chairman there in 1593. The mentioned Monseur de la Queste must refer to Jean de la Guesle (d. 1588), who was appointed president of the parliament of Burgundy by Catherine de' Medici, who Mander refers to as "Queen". It is unclear who the Archbishop of Bourges was, but Jean de la Guesle had a son Francois who was archbishop of Tours.

It is unknown why Mast returned to Delft, where he later died, but probably this was because both his patrons had died.

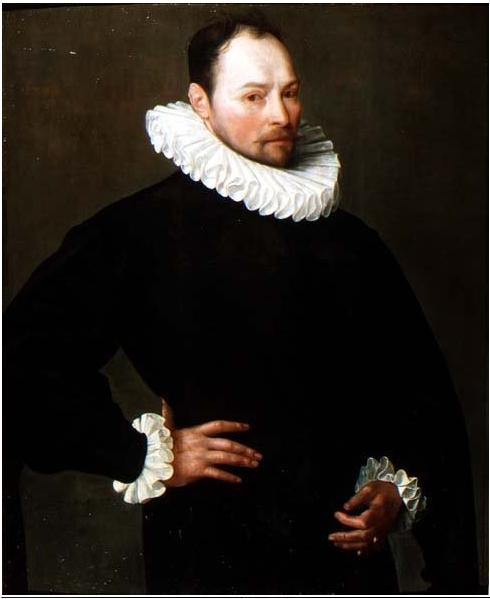
Portrait of a man aged 33 in 1589

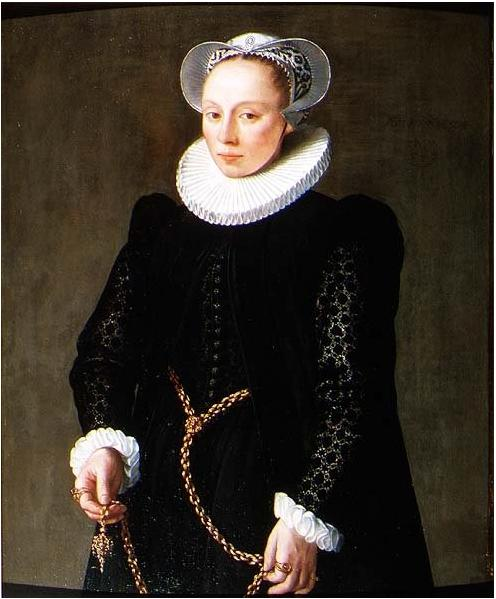
Portrait of a woman aged 24 in 1587
