= Jan Baptist Francken =

Apocryphal painter from Antwerp

Jan Baptist Francken was supposed to be a painter from the Francken family and/or the son of Sebastian Vrancx, but is now considered to have been an error and to have never existed. The confusion was created by the many painters named Francken, some poor attributions, and a portrait by Anthony van Dyck of a certain Johannes Baptist Franck, aged 32, of whom nothing more is known. He is sometimes said to be the same as Hans Francken (born in 1581), another obscure member of the same family.

In art histories from the 18th and 19th century like Michael Bryan's Bryan's dictionary of painters and engravers (1886) he received a lengthy lemma:

FRANCKEN, Jan Baptist, the son of Sebastiaen Francken, was born at Antwerp in 1599. He received his first instruction from his father, and for some time followed his style, which he afterwards improved by an attentive study of the works of Rubens and Van Dyck. His first efforts were historical subjects; but he adopted a mode of representing the interiors of saloons and galleries, embellished with pictures and statues, &c., with gallant assemblies of figures and conversations. His works of that description were painted with great beauty of colouring, and a very spirited touch. They were greatly sought after, and were placed in the choicest collections. He possessed a talent of imitating so exactly the peculiar touch and style of each master in the small pictures he introduced into his galleries, that it was easy to point out the original painter. It was the possession of this talent that induced so many contemporary artists to solicit his assistance to decorate their pictures with small figures, both in landscapes and interiors. Many of Pieter Neefils's are so ornamented. He died in 1653. Pictures by him of the Beheading of St. John the Baptist are at Augsburg and Brussels, and at Bruges there is a picture of Christ among the Doctors.

Other dictionaries and encyclopedias which included him were e.g. Friedrich Müller's Die Künstler aller Zeiten und Völker (1860) and Jean-Baptiste Descamps' La Vie des Peintres Flamands (1754) (as "Jean-Baptiste Franck"). The Old St. John's Hospital in Bruges listed two of his works in their collection in 1861. Théodore Lejeune's Guide théorique et pratique de l'amateur de tableaux even said that he was "considéré comme le meilleur peintre de la famille", i.e. "considered to be the best painter of the family".

Already in the 1857-1864 work by Christiaan Kramm, De levens en werken der Hollandsche en Vlaamsche kunstschilders, beeldhouwers, graveurs en bouwmeesters, van den vroegsten tot op onzen tijd, doubts were formulated about the biographical details given about this painter, which didn't match the dates given for some of his works, or the age given on the Van Dyck painting. Recent books or sites on the Francken family no longer list Jan Baptist Francken. Paintings earlier attributed to Jan Baptist Francken have now been reattributed to other painters, sometimes members of the Francken family, sometimes others like Louis de Caullery.
