= Constantijn Francken =

Flemish painter

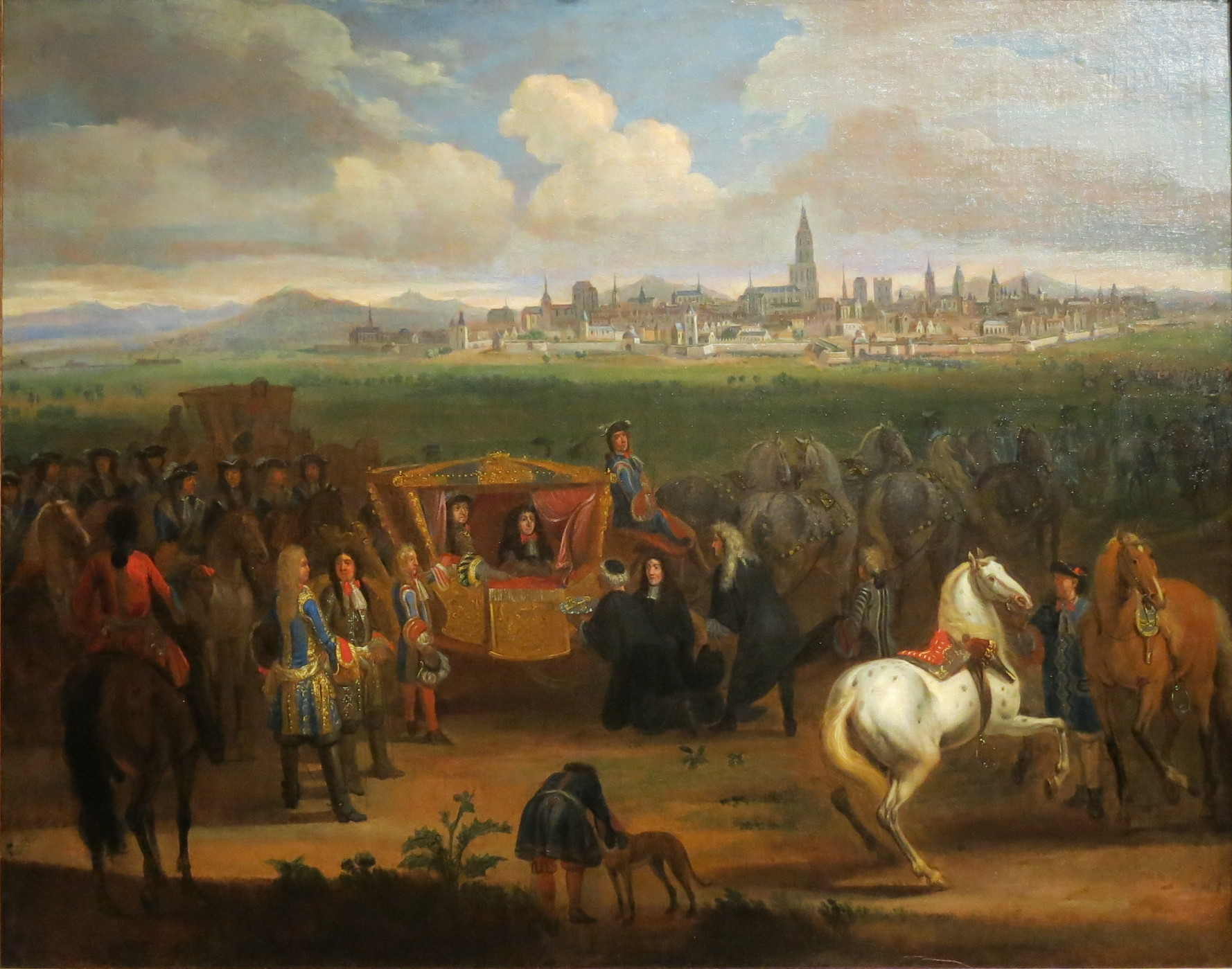
- Louis XIV receiving the keys of Strasbourg in 1681
- Born: April 5, 1661; Antwerp, Belgium
- Died: January 12, 1717 (aged 55); Antwerp, Belgium
- Burial place: St. James' Church, Antwerp
- Other names: Konstantijn Francken
- Occupation: Painter
- Spouse: Christina Clara (m. 1696)
- Father: Hieronymus Francken III
- Family: Frans Francken the Younger (grandfather)

Constantijn Francken or Konstantijn Francken (Baptised on 5 April 1661, Antwerp – 1717, Antwerp), was a Flemish Baroque painter and the final painter in the long line of the Francken family of artists. He is mainly known for his battle scenes. He worked for a long time in Paris where he was a court painter to the King and mainly painted portraits.

== Life ==
Francken was born in Antwerp as the son of Hieronymous Francken III and Cornelia Daep. He was baptised on 5 April 1661. He was the final artist in the Francken family of artists, which had played an important role in Flemish paintings since the second half of the 16th century and whose large workshop was a standard of quality artistic production in Antwerp. Constantijn's father Hieronymous was the son of Frans Francken the Younger, the most famous scion of the Francken dynasty. There are several attributions of work to Hieronymous but none authenticated. Hieronymous died in 1671 and cannot have played a major role in the artistic training of his son. It is unknown who his teacher was but it is possible that Constantijn was trained in the Francken family workshop.

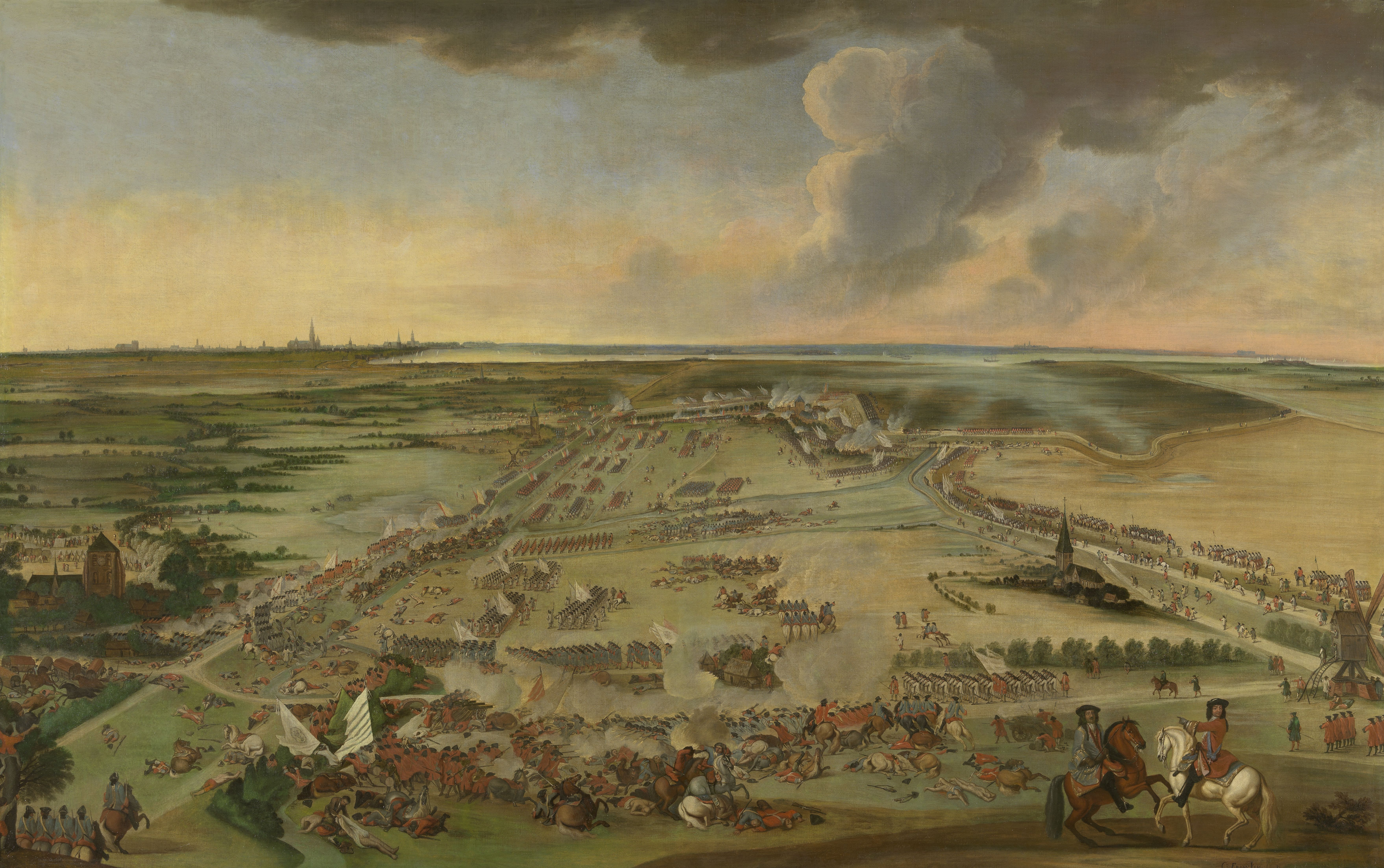
Battle of Ekeren of 1703

It is believed that at an early age he went to Paris where he may have been active between 1679 and 1694. During his period in Paris he may have produced work for the French king Louis XIV. Evidence of his residence in Paris is a declaration made on 2 May 1699 in Antwerp by the engraver Cornelis Vermeulen and others about Constantijn Francken's successful activities in Paris. Upon his return to Antwerp he declared in a submission to the Antwerp Magistrate dated 10 December 1694 that he had been active for 15 years in Paris, Versailles and other residences of the king of France where he had been painting portraits that gained him an excellent reputation. He further stated that he was ready to establish himself in Antwerp if he were relieved from the obligation to provide city services. He obtained a relief of military service on 24 January 1695.

In the guild year 1694-1695 he joined the Antwerp Guild of St. Luke as a 'wijnmeester', i.e. the son of a master.

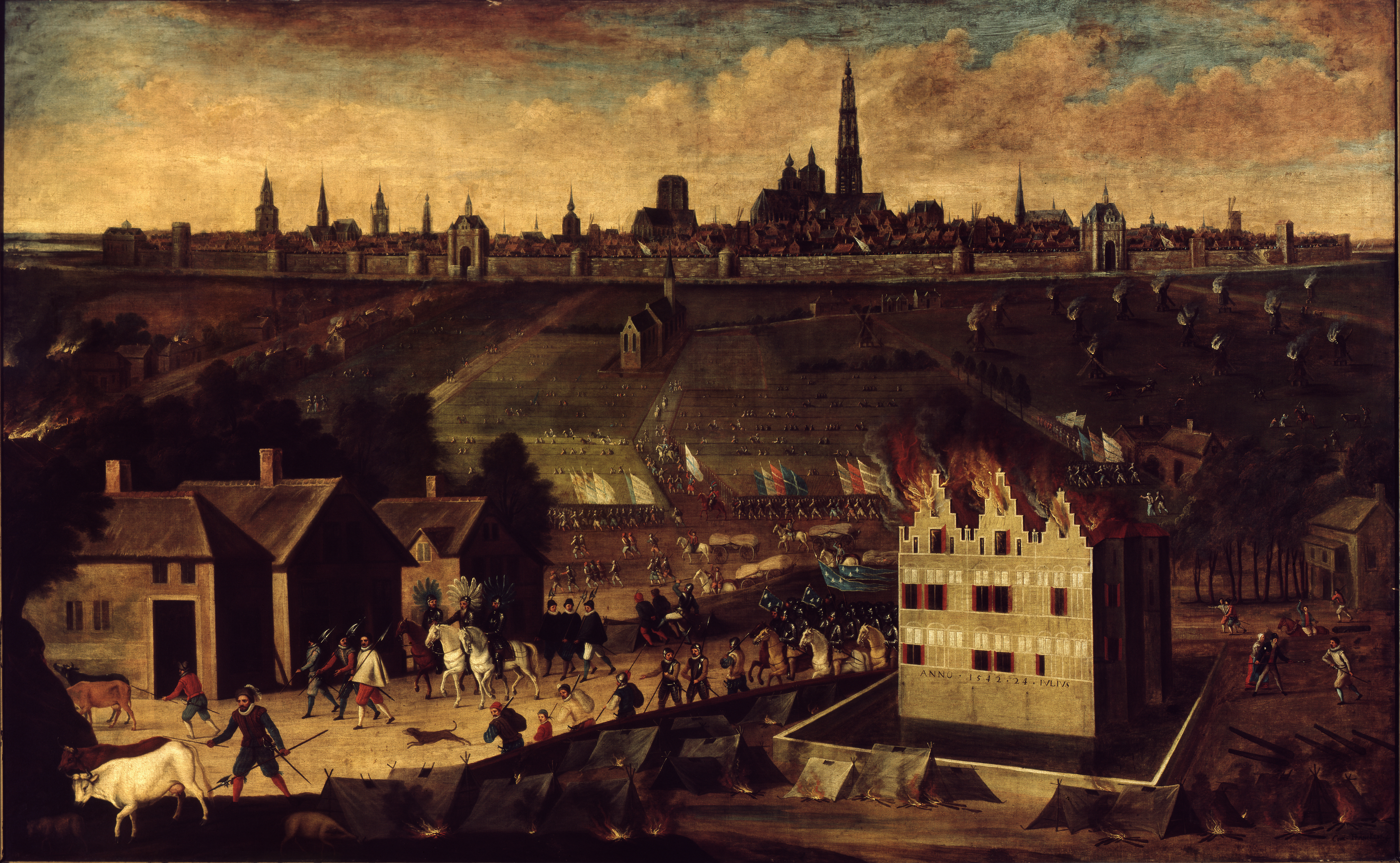
Maarten van Rossum's departure after his attack on Antwerp on 24 July 1542

In the guild year 1695-1696 he was dean of the guild but was exempted from active duties as a dean by a payment of 300 Guilders and some guns to the guild. He took on Karel van Falens as his pupil in the same year. Van Falens later specialised in hunting and hawking scenes and worked for the king of France.

On 28 April 1696 Francken married Christina Clara who was originally from Boechout. His wife later developed a mental illness and was said to have run away from home naked. His wife's family accused Francken of having caused his wife's illness by squandering her inheritance. The dispute between the two families became quite heated and Constantijn was ordered by penalty of physical punishment to desist from insulting his brother-in-law. It appears that he spent above his means although he was successful as an artist and his works fetched high prices. He sold in 1703 a large painting of the Battle of Ekeren of 1703 (now in the Royal Museum of Fine Arts Antwerp) to the city of Antwerp for 280 Guilders.

He died debt-laden on 12 January 1717 in Antwerp in a house he was renting in de Lange Nieuwstraat. He was buried on the same day in the St. James' Church.

== Work ==
While Francken seems to have worked mainly as a portrait painter during his 15-year residence in France, there are no known portraits by his hand. He is now only known for landscapes depicting military episodes. In addition to the Battle of Ekeren, he painted a canvas showing Maarten van Rossum's departure after his attack on Antwerp on 24 July 1542 (Museum aan de Stroom, Antwerp), The siege of Namur by William III of Orange (unknown location), the Presentation of the keys of Strasbourg to Louis XIV (Musée historique de Strasbourg) and an unlocated bird's eye view of a battle painted in 1702.

He was very skilled at placing the various actors in the military scenes in lively positions.

== Family tree ==
Francken family tree

Nicolaes Francken; 1515–1596
Hieronymus Francken I 1540–1610	Frans Francken I 1542–1616	Ambrosius Francken I 1544–1618	(Cornelius Francken)
Isabella Francken	Thomas Francken; 1574–1625	Hieronymus Francken II; 1578–1623	Frans Francken II; 1581–1642	Ambrosius Francken II; 1590–1632	Hans Francken; 1581–after 1610
Frans Francken III; 1607–1667	Hieronymus Francken III; 1611–after 1661	Ambrosius Francken III; 1614–1662
Constantijn Francken; 1661–1717
