= Ambrosius Francken II =

Flemish painter

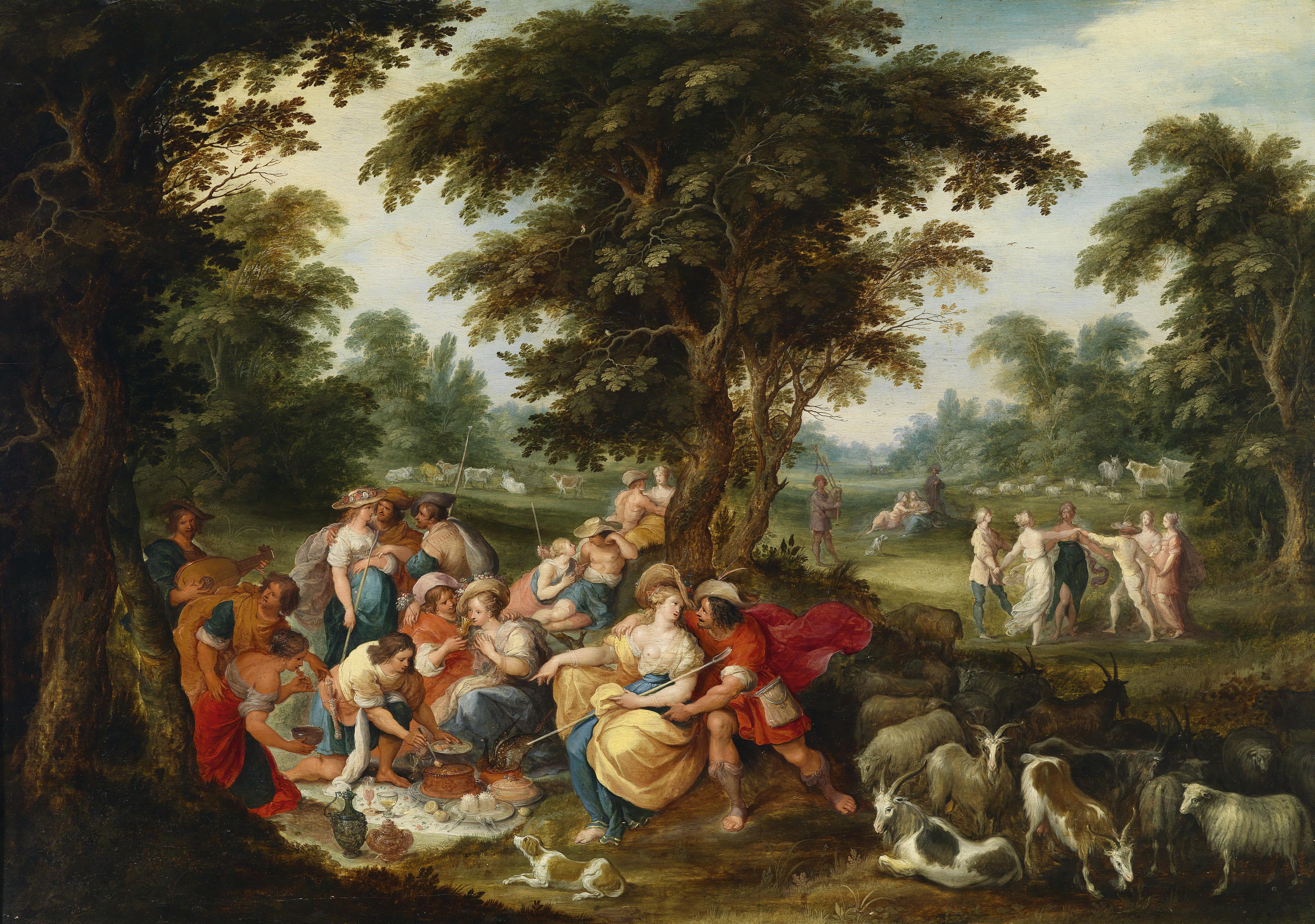
- Arcadia; The Golden Age, a collaborative work by Ambrosius Francken II, Frans Francken the Younger, Hans III Jordaens, Abraham Govaerts and Alexander Keirincx
- Born: Late 16th century Antwerp, Belgium
- Died: 1632
- Other names: Ambrosius Francken the Younger
- Occupation: Painter
- Father: Frans Francken the Elder

Ambrosius Francken II, also called Ambrosius Francken the Younger to distinguish him from his uncle of the same name, was born at Antwerp in the latter part of the 16th century. He studied under his father, Frans Francken the elder, whose style he imitated. In 1624 he was registered as a master in the Guild of St. Luke at Antwerp, and he is said to have painted some time in Leuven. He died in 1632. Little else is known of him.

== Family tree ==
Francken family tree

Nicolaes Francken; 1515–1596
Hieronymus Francken I 1540–1610	Frans Francken I 1542–1616	Ambrosius Francken I 1544–1618	(Cornelius Francken)
Isabella Francken	Thomas Francken; 1574–1625	Hieronymus Francken II; 1578–1623	Frans Francken II; 1581–1642	Ambrosius Francken II; 1590–1632	Hans Francken; 1581–after 1610
Frans Francken III; 1607–1667	Hieronymus Francken III; 1611–after 1661	Ambrosius Francken III; 1614–1662
Constantijn Francken; 1661–1717
