= Karin Franken =

Dutch animal welfare advocate

Karin Franken is a Dutch animal welfare advocate working in Indonesia. She is the co-founder of the Jakarta Animal Aid Network (JAAN).

== Biography ==
Franken was born and raised in the Netherlands, on the outskirts of The Hague. In the early 1990s, her parents moved to Jakarta. While visiting and travelling in Indonesia she noticed a need for improvements to animal welfare standards and began to volunteer with animal rescue organisations such as Pondok Pengayom Satwa in Ragunan, South Jakarta. She became the head of the organisation, until 2008, when she established JAAN with Femke den Haas and Natalie Stewart. She campaigned actively against the use of dog meat as food for human consumption and saw its trade as a way rabies was spread across Indonesia.
