= Fritz Francken =

Belgian writer

- Born: Frederik Edward Clijmans; 17 April 1893; Antwerp, Belgium
- Died: 15 August 1969 (aged 76); Antwerp, Belgium
- Occupations: Poet, prose writer

Frederik Edward Clijmans (17 April 1893 – 15 August 1969) was a Flemish poet and prose writer, he used the pseudonym Fritz Francken. He is best known for his war poetry and prose.

Clijmans initially worked as a journalist and as a librarian. Thereafter he concentrated more on writing fiction. His first collection of poems Festijnen uit een huisgetij was published in 1914. Francken fought in the First World War and later wrote about his experiences as a soldier. In the 1930s Francken was head of the tourism department in his native Antwerp for several years. In the course of his life he concentrated mainly on stories, novels, essays and memoirs. He mainly wrote about the little things in everyday life.

== Bibliography ==
- Het heilige schrijn, collection of war verses, 1918.
- De vijf glorierijke wonden, collection of war verses, 1919.
- Ónder ons, sketches and narrations, 1912-1920.
- De planeet der onsterfelijken novella, 1921.
- Vrijbuiters, stories, 1923
- De laatste nacht van Mata Hari, story, 1923
- De roode pelikaan, stories, 1924.
- Aan het vinkentouw, stories, 1928.
- Een galg vol!, novella, 1929.
- Beknopte geschiedenis van Antwerpen, monograph on the history of Antwerp, 1931.
- Batig saldo, poetry, 1934.
- Met klein zeil, poetry, 1936.
- Korte vertellingen, stories, 1938.
- Verzamelde gedichten, 1941.
- Groote parade en klein garnizoen, stories, 1944.
- Halte op verzoek, stories, 1958.
- Bange Dagen, short stories, 1959.
- Belofte maakt schuld, 1959.
- Galgenaas, short stories, 1960.
- De Sater, short stories, 1961.
- Normandische suite, poetry, 1964.
- Nagras, poetry, 1964
- Silhouetten, short pieces of prose, 1966
- Laatste verzen, poetry, 1968
