= Isabella Francken =

Dutch artist

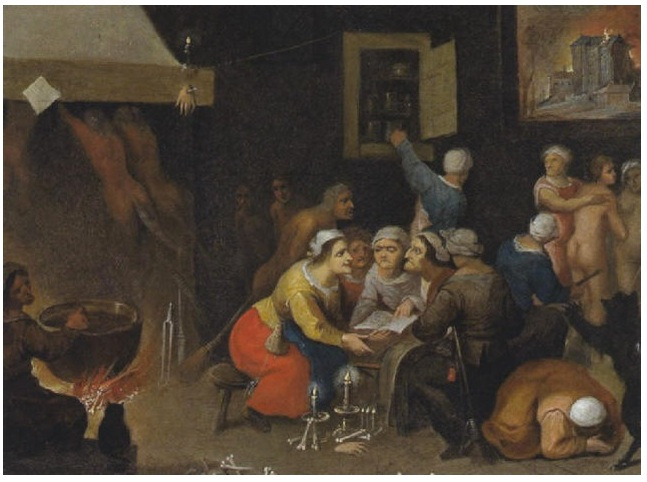
- A Gathering of Witches, Isabella Francken
- Occupation: Painter
- Father: Hieronymus Francken I

Isabella Francken (d. after 1631) was a Flemish painter who was active in the first part of the 17th century. She was a member of the large Francken family of artists. Only a few works are currently attributed to her. These are history, landscape, and genre paintings, which are in the style representative of the Francken family workshop.

== Life ==
Very little is known about the life and training of Isabella Francken. She was the daughter of Hieronymus Francken I. Her father had been a pupil of Frans Floris and had settled in France in 1578.

Isabella Francken was primarily active between 1600-1614 in Paris.

== Work ==
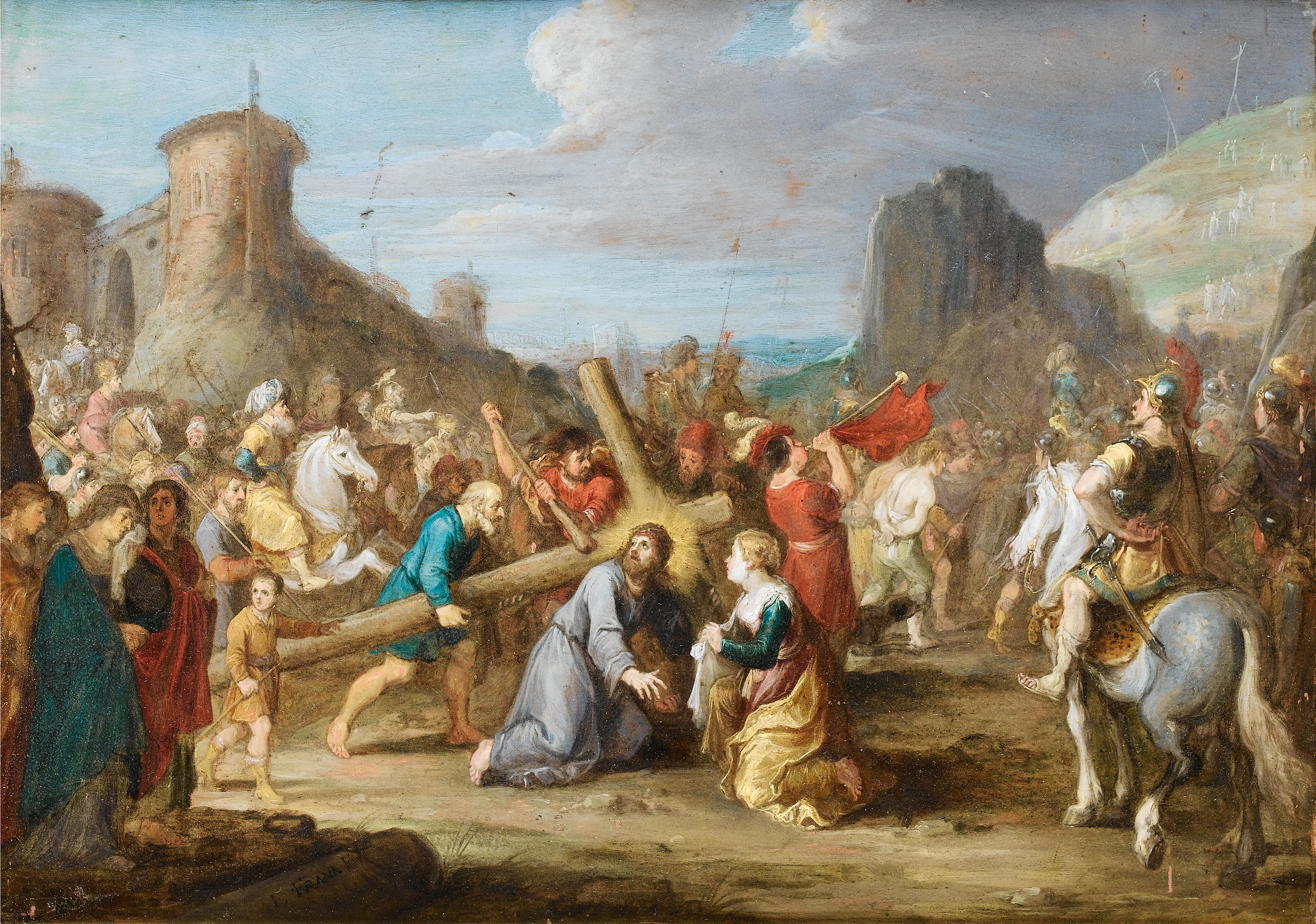
The Road to Calvary

Only two works are currently attributed to Isabella Francken: The Road to Calvary (Sold at Bonhams on 8 July 2009 in London, lot 76) and A Gathering of Witches (Sold at Dorotheum on 2 October 2002 in Vienna, lot 360). Both works are oil on copper paintings.

The Road to Calvary is similar to two groups of paintings by her cousin Frans Francken II of the same subject, which are generally dated either to the first decade of the seventeenth century or to circa 1618. The composition depicts the meeting between Christ carrying the cross and Saint Veronica who has a cloth to wipe Christ's face. It is signed and dated lower left: I. FRANCK.F / 1631.

A Gathering of Witches depicts a group of witches in an interior space. It is extremely similar to the compositions of the same subject by her cousins Frans Francken II and Hieronymous Francken II.

== Family tree ==
Francken family tree

Nicolaes Francken; 1515–1596
Hieronymus Francken I 1540–1610	Frans Francken I 1542–1616	Ambrosius Francken I 1544–1618	(Cornelius Francken)
Isabella Francken	Thomas Francken; 1574–1625	Hieronymus Francken II; 1578–1623	Frans Francken II; 1581–1642	Ambrosius Francken II; 1590–1632	Hans Francken; 1581–after 1610
Frans Francken III; 1607–1667	Hieronymus Francken III; 1611–after 1661	Ambrosius Francken III; 1614–1662
Constantijn Francken; 1661–1717
