= Frans Francken III =

Flemish Baroque painter (1607–1667)

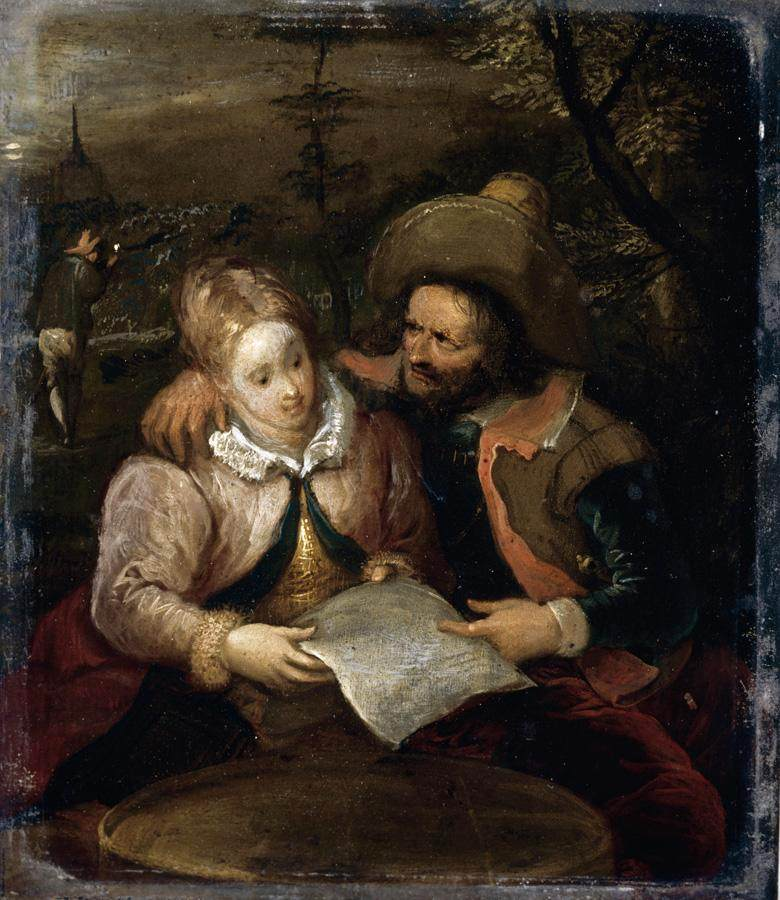
- A Young Lady and a Cavalier Holding a Letter
- Born: 1607; Antwerp, Belgium
- Died: 1667 (aged 59–60); Antwerp, Spanish Netherlands
- Occupation: Painting
- Father: Frans Francken the Younger

Frans Francken III (1607–1667) was a Flemish Baroque painter and the best known member of the fourth generation of the Francken family of artists.

== Life ==
Francken was born and died in Antwerp. He was the son of Frans Francken II and Elisabeth Placquet and became a master in the Antwerp Guild of St. Luke in 1639. He was dean of the Guild of St. Luke in 1656–66.

He was the teacher of Carstian Luyckx, and Jan Baptist Segaert.

== Work ==
Frans Francken III is known for genre works and portraits, and painted staffage in the works of Pieter Neeffs I and, more frequently, his son Pieter Neeffs II. While his figures generally follow his father's style, they are painted with less accuracy. He was skilled at arranging his figures well in the composition and light.

His cabinet-size history paintings also follow his father's style generally while showing a strong influence of Rubens' style. As a result, Frans Francken III was sometimes referred to the 'Rubensschen Francken' (the 'Rubensian Francken').

== Family tree ==
Francken family tree

Nicolaes Francken; 1515–1596
Hieronymus Francken I 1540–1610	Frans Francken I 1542–1616	Ambrosius Francken I 1544–1618	(Cornelius Francken)
Isabella Francken	Thomas Francken; 1574–1625	Hieronymus Francken II; 1578–1623	Frans Francken the Younger; 1581–1642	Ambrosius Francken II; 1590–1632	Hans Francken; 1581–after 1610
Frans Francken III; 1607–1667	Hieronymus Francken III; 1611–after 1661	Ambrosius Francken III; 1614–1662
Constantijn Francken; 1661–1717
