= Francken family =

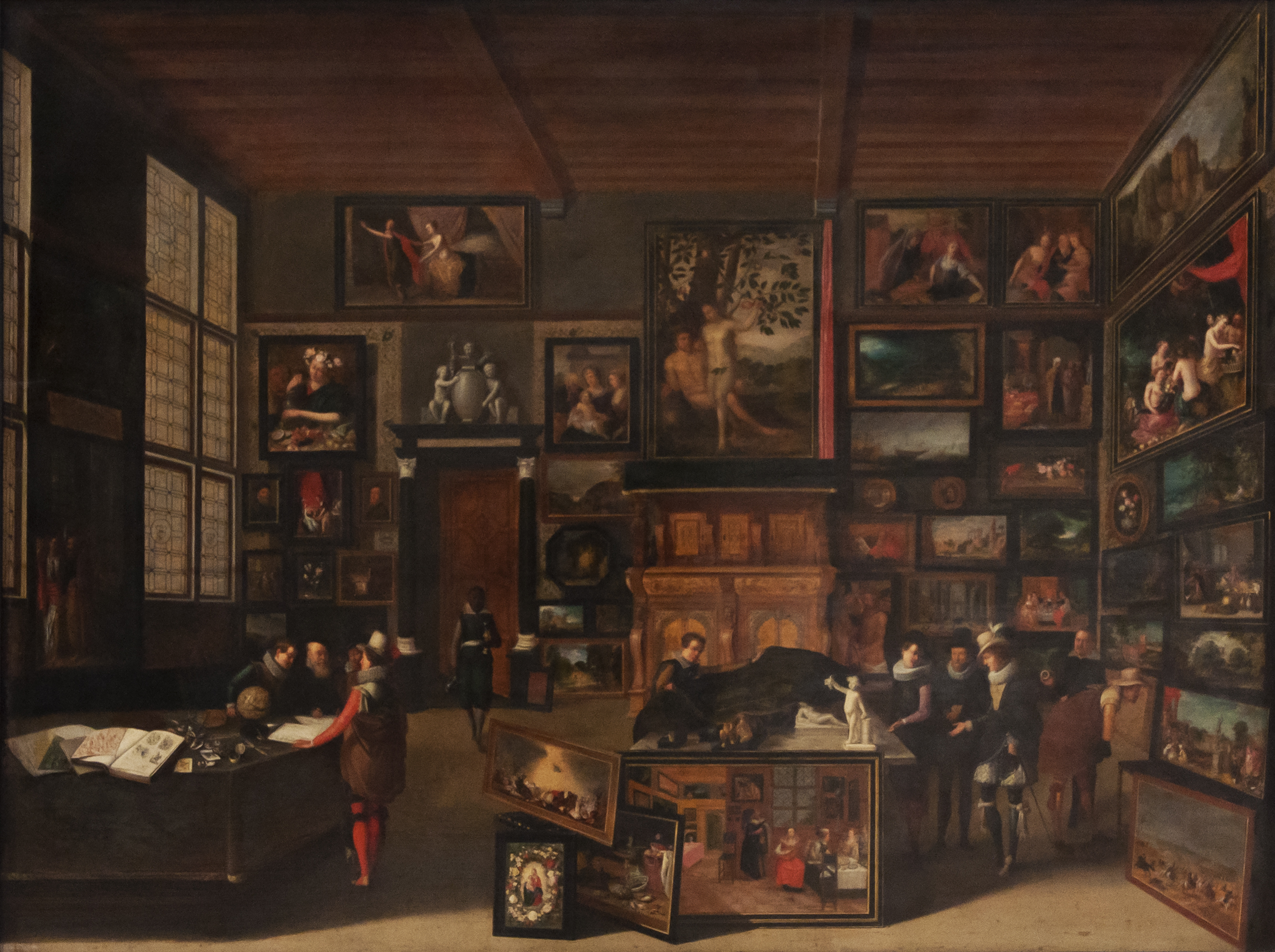
The Cabinet of an Art Collector, by Hieronymus Francken II, 1621

The Francken family was a family of artists the members of which were mainly active in Antwerp in the 16th and 17th centuries. Many of the members over three generations had the same first names—Frans, Hieronymus and Ambrosius. While this may at the time have been effective as a marketing method by ensuring continuity of the family business, today's legacy is some confusion in the attribution of paintings, which often do not differ widely in style or execution between the various family members. The confusion is exacerbated by the signing practices of some family members: when Frans I's son Frans II reached his majority and began to sign paintings, Frans I started to add "the elder" to his signature to distinguish himself from his son, who then signed his works as "the younger". This happened again in the next generation when Frans II's son Frans III reached his majority. Frans II then started to sign his works with the elder, while Frans III used Frans the younger.

== Family tree ==
Francken family tree

Nicolaes Francken; 1515–1596
Hieronymus Francken I 1540–1610	Frans Francken I 1542–1616	Ambrosius Francken I 1544–1618	(Cornelius Francken)
Isabella Francken	Thomas Francken; 1574–1625	Hieronymus Francken II; 1578–1623	Frans Francken II; 1581–1642	Ambrosius Francken II; 1590–1632	Hans Francken; 1581–after 1610
Frans Francken III; 1607–1667	Hieronymus Francken III; 1611–after 1661	Ambrosius Francken III; 1614–1662
Constantijn Francken; 1661–1717

== Nicolaes Francken ==
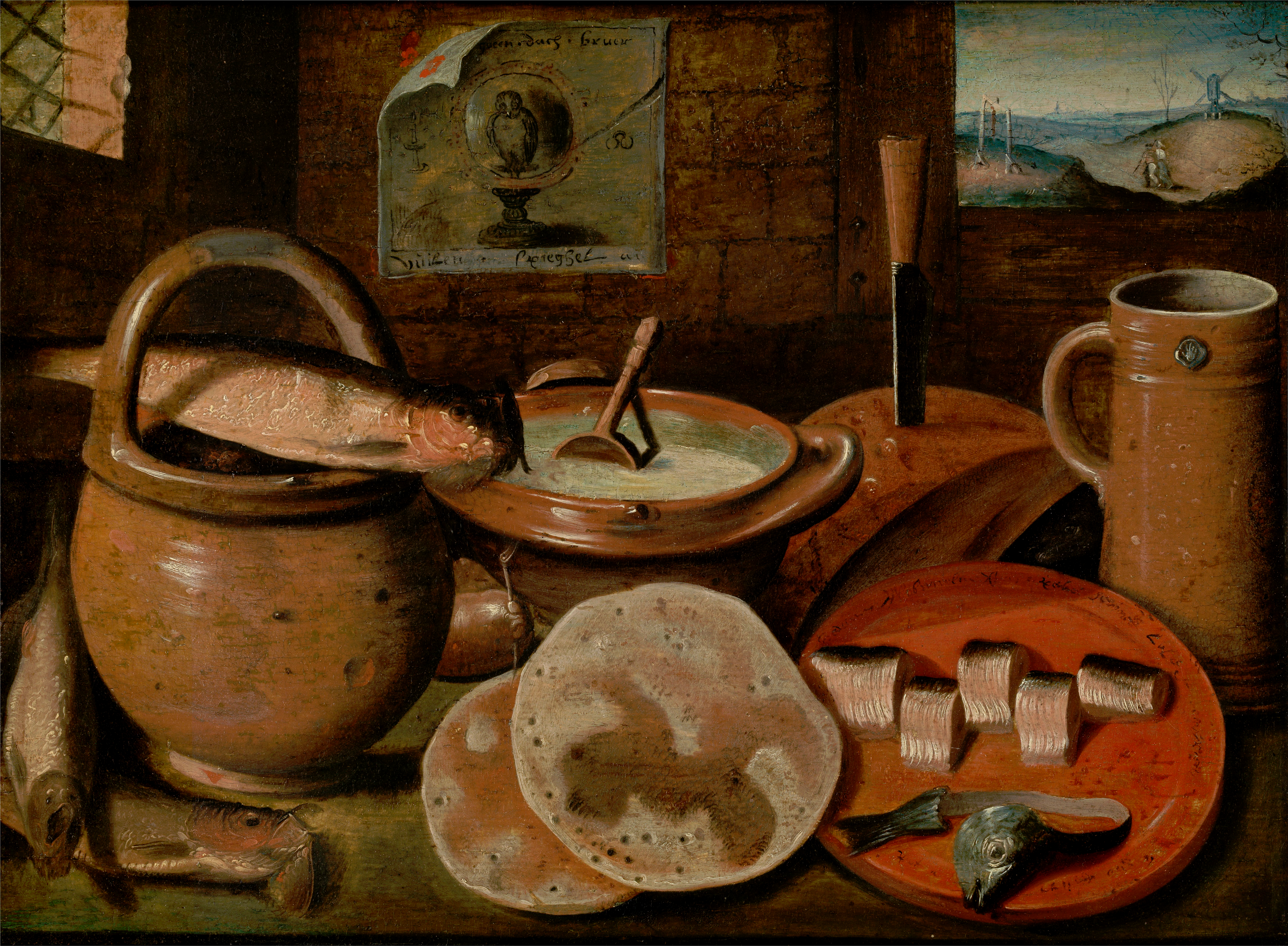
Poor Man's Dinner, by Hieronymus Francken (II)

The founder of the painting dynasty was Nicolaes Francken, also known as 'Nicolaes Francken van Herentals' as he was born c. 1520 in the town of Herentals before he moved to Antwerp c. 1580. He was married to Lucia van de Broeck from Mechelen with whom he had five children. Nicolaes was active in Antwerp where he died in 1596. None of his works have survived.

== Sons of Nicolaes ==
Nicolaes Francken had three sons who became painters after training under their father and Frans Floris :

- Hieronymus I (ca. 1540 –1610): he became a court painter in France.
  - The history and genre painter Isabella Francken probably was his daughter
- Frans I (1542 – 1616): he was a leading Counter-Reformation painter in Antwerp.
- Ambrosius I (1544 – 1618): he became known for his religious works and historical allegories painted in a late Mannerist style.

== Sons of Frans I ==
Frans I trained four sons in his profession:

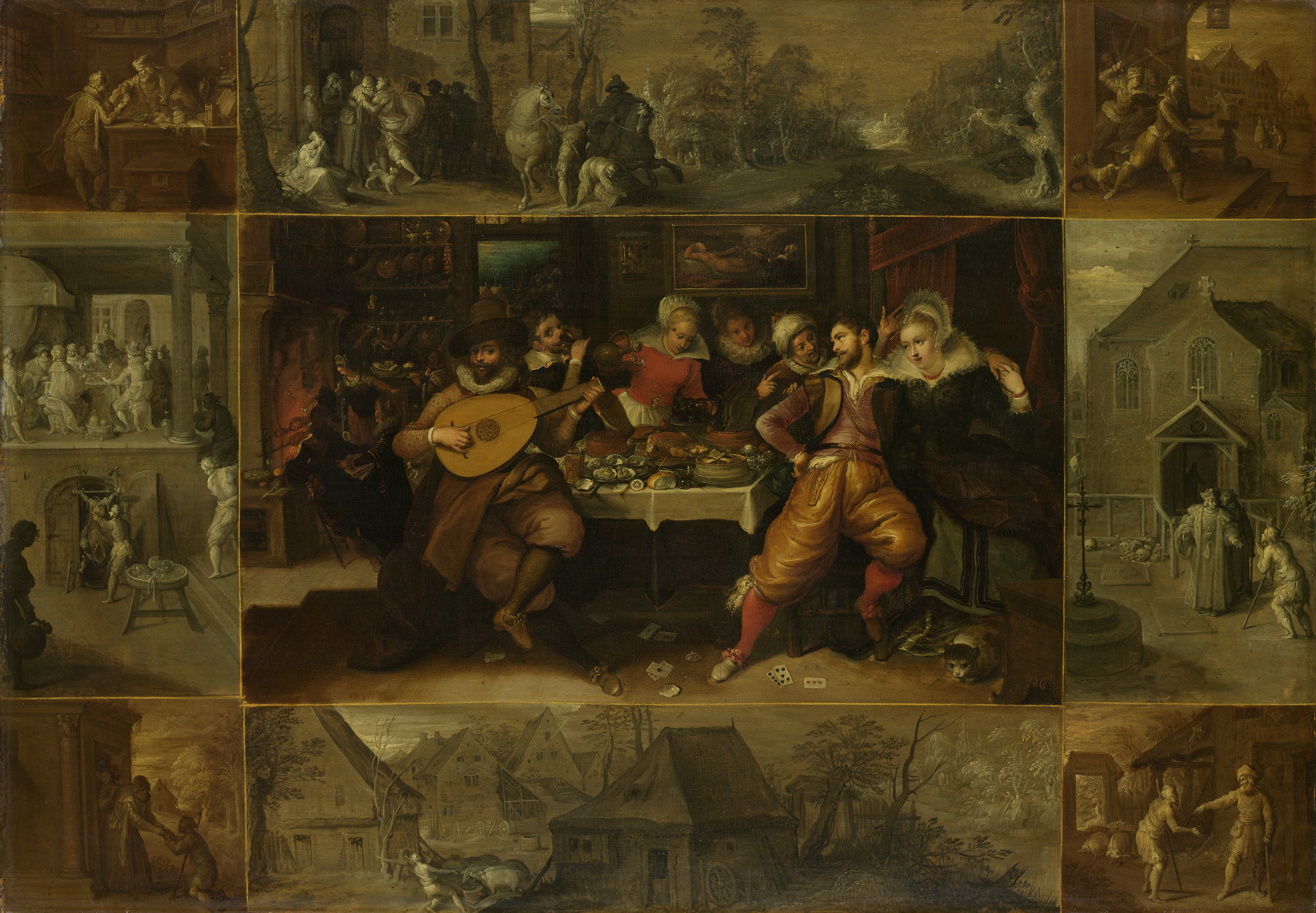
The Parable of the Prodigal Son, by Frans Francken II, c. 1610

- Thomas Francken (1574 – 1625): he was active in Antwerp c. 1600 - 1610 and had numerous students.
- Hieronymus II (1578–1623): he trained under his father and was an important contributor to developments in Flemish genre painting.
- Frans II (1581 – 6 May 1642): he trained under his father and became one of the most prominent members of the Francken family of artists. He played an important role in the development of Flemish art in the first half of the 17th century through his innovations in genre painting and introduction of new subject matter.
- Ambrosius II (after 1581–1632): he trained under his father and was active in Antwerp.

== Next generation ==
Frans Francken III (1607–1667) is the last Frans Francken who enjoyed an artistic reputation. He entered the Antwerp guild in 1639 and died in Antwerp in 1667. His practice was chiefly confined to adding figures to the architectural or landscape pieces of other artists. Frans III often introduced staffage into the works of Pieter Neefs the Younger. His cabinet-size history paintings follow his father's style generally but also show a strong influence of Rubens' style. As a result, Frans Francken III was sometimes referred to the 'Rubensschen Francken' (the 'Rubensian Francken'). Frans III had a brother Hieronymus Francken III (1611–1671), whose son Constantijn Francken (1661–1717) was the youngest painting branch of the family.

== See also ==
- Jan Baptist Francken, a member of the family who never existed, recorded in error
