= Ambrosius Francken I =

Flemish painter

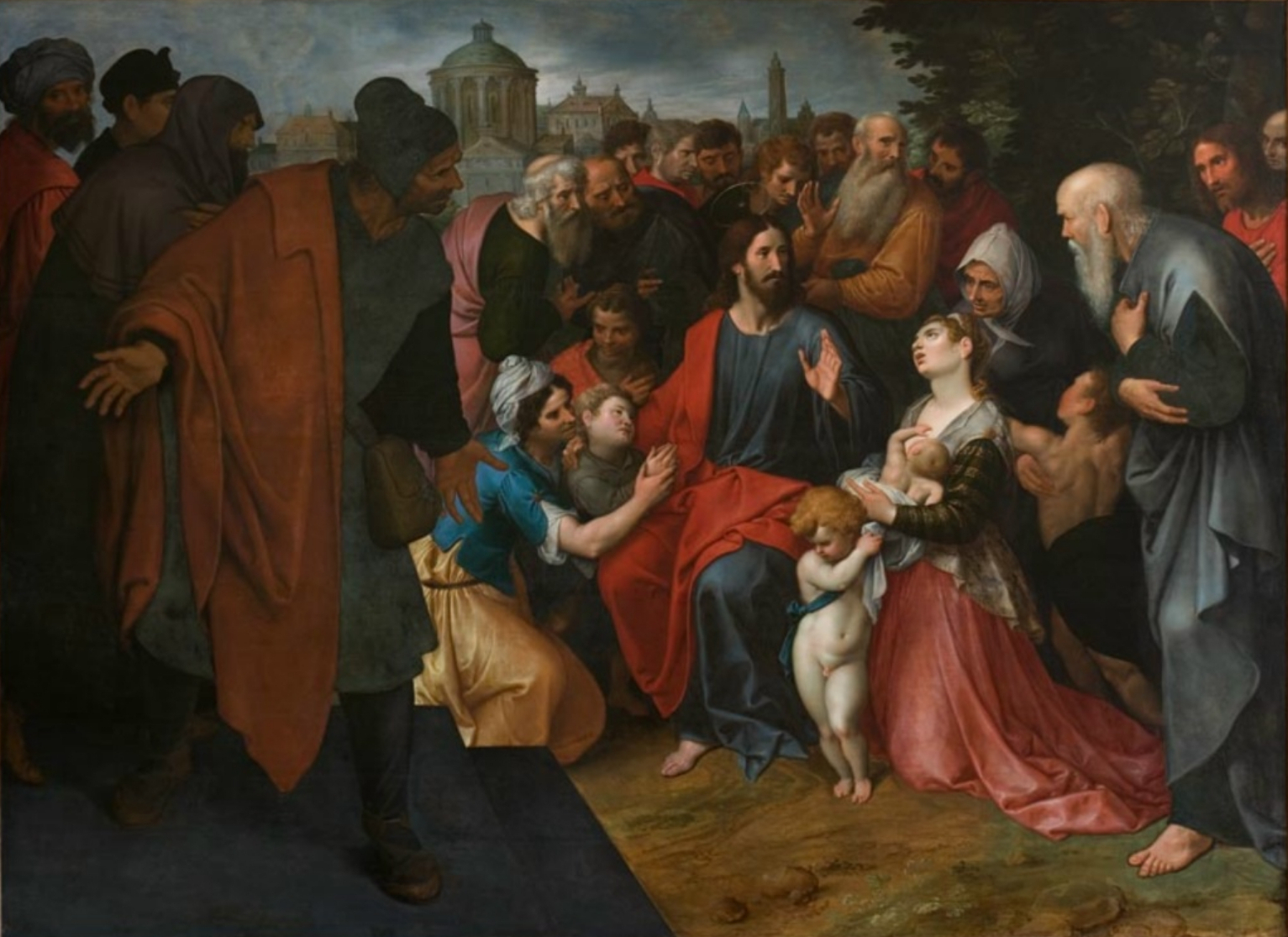
- Christ blessing the Children, 1600
- Born: 1544/45; Herentals, Antwerp, Habsburg Netherlands
- Died: 1618 (aged 73–74); Antwerp, Habsburg Netherlands
- Occupation: Painter

Ambrosius Francken I (1544/45–October 1618) was a Flemish painter known for his religious works and historical allegories painted in a late Mannerist style. He was also active as a stone dealer and possibly art dealer. He was a prominent member of the Francken family of artists, which played a very important role in the Flemish art scene from the late 16th to middle 17th century.

== Life ==
Ambrosius Francken I was born in Herentals, the son of painter Nicolaes Francken and Lucia van den Broeck. His brothers Frans Francken I and Hieronymus Francken I both became successful painters. Ambrosius studied initially under his father. His father then sent him to Antwerp where between 1566 and 1568 he worked as a journey man in the workshop of the leading Antwerp Mannerist painter Frans Floris. Floris's workshop was the busiest of Antwerp and turned out many history paintings for the rich merchants and poorters of Antwerp. Ambrosius lived in a very turbulent time due to the conflict between Calvinists and Catholics in the Low Countries. In 1566, Calvinist iconoclasts had destroyed many artworks in the churches of Antwerp and other Flemish cities.

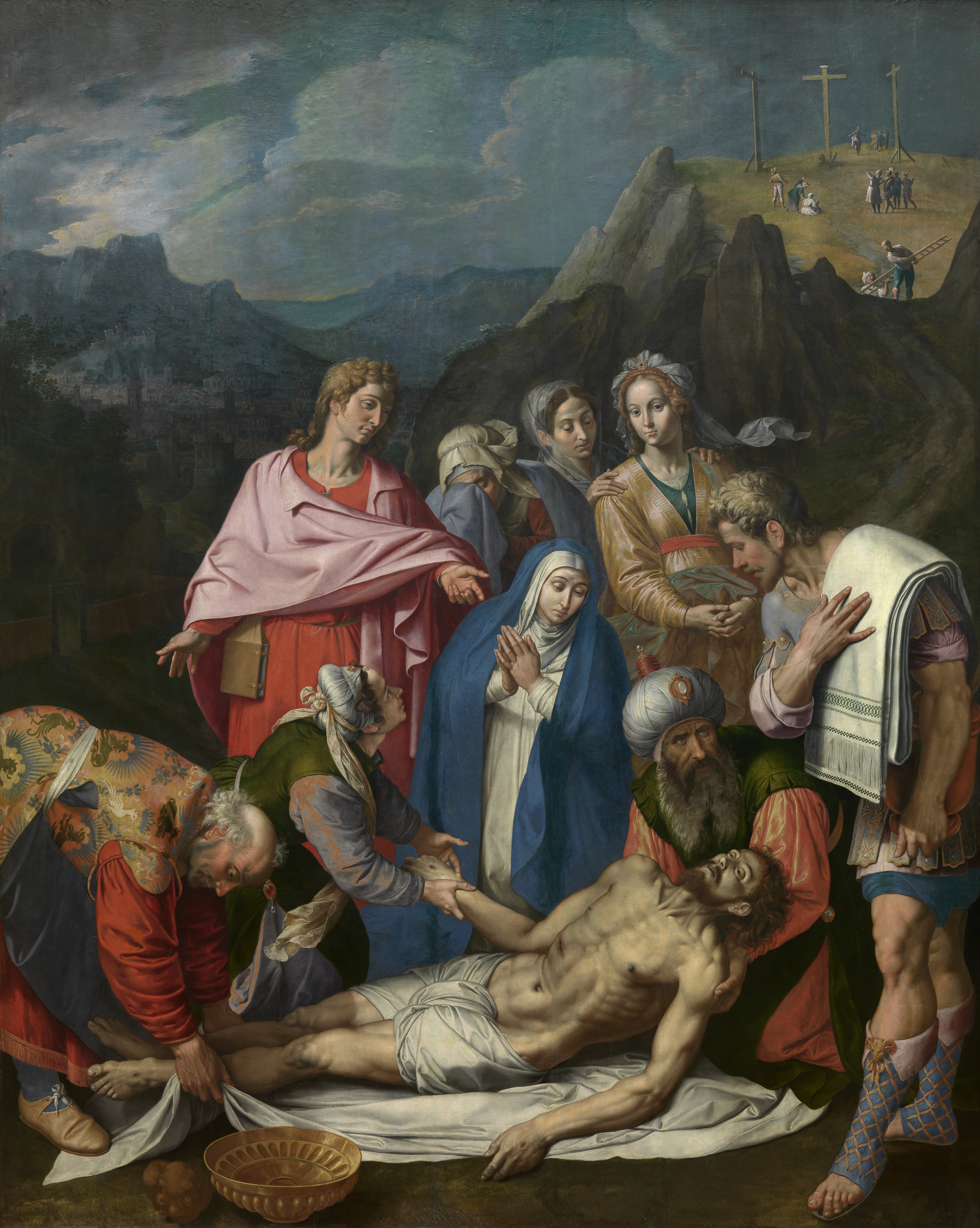
The Entombment

The early biographer Karel van Mander reports in the Schilder-boeck that Francken spent time in Tournai where he lived at the Bishop's residence. Van Mander met him in Tournai while he himself was residing there as a young pupil at his master Pieter Vlerick's house. There was much work for artists in Tournai as it had also been ravaged by the Calvinist fury against artworks. He did not remain in Tournai for long. Between 1568 and 1570 he worked some time in Fontainebleau where his older brother Hieronymus had already settled in 1566. No records remain of his activities in Fontainebleau where a large number of international artists had found work on the decoration of the king's new palace. He is believed to have made some drawings on commedia dell'arte performances. He was a witness at a baptism ceremony in Avon, Île-de-France, France on 27 May 1570. He resided from 1570 to 1573 in Paris.

Around 1573 Ambrosius Francken I was back in Antwerp where he joined the local Guild of Saint Luke as a master the same year. In 1577 he became a poorter (citizen) of Antwerp. He married in the same year 50 year old Barbara Reyns, the widow of Peeter de Bruyne with whom she already had two children. His wife was 30 years older than him and had inherited her husband's stone trading business. Francken and his wife continued the stone trading business, which was very lucrative as many buildins in Antwerp needed repairs after the damage caused by the troubles in the preceding years. In 1577 Antwerp had elected a Calvinist city council. The council ordered in 1581 the systematic removal of all images from local churches. This event is referred to as the 'silent iconoclasm'. It is unclear whether Ambrosius converted to Calvinism himself. He was elected dean of the Guild in 1582. After the death of his wife in July 1582 he was no longer involved in the stone trading business as this was inherited by his wife's children from her first marriage. He married on 11 April a second time to Clara Pickarts, who was the widow of a hosemaker. He also took in the two children of his deceased brother Cornelis. After the Fall of Antwerp, the city became Catholic again and Ambrosius made it known he had was of the Catholic faith.

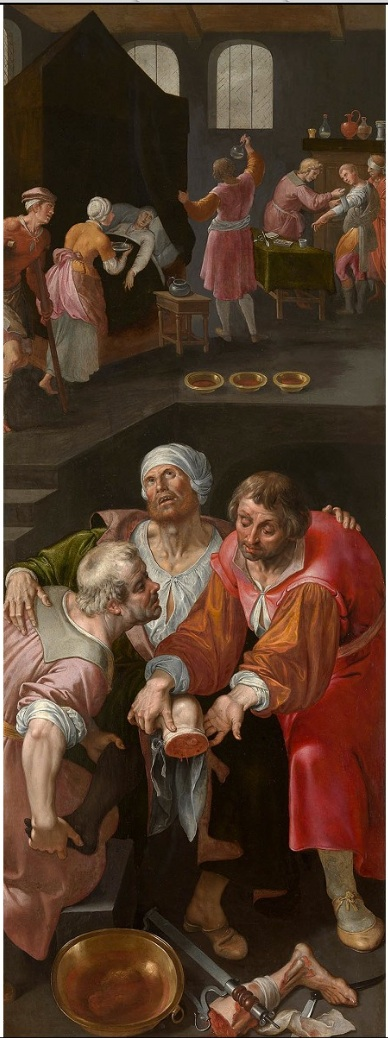
The Charity of Saints Cosmas and Damian

He clearly established a name for himself as a prolific maker of the many altarpieces that replaced the ones destroyed during the iconoclastic troubles. His reputation was such that in 1589 he together with Maerten de Vos was appointed by the Ghent magistrate to value the painting of the Last Judgment by Raphael Coxie. Raphael Coxie was involved in a dispute with the Ghent magistrate who he felt was offering a sum that was too low for his masterpiece. Ambrosius Francken and Marten de Vos were also chosen as the chief designers of the decorations for the 1594 Joyous Entry into Antwerp of the newly appointed governor of the Southern Netherlands, Archduke Ernest of Austria.

He was the teacher of Hieronymus Francken II, the son of his brother Frans Francken I, Hans Fonck, Dierick Mosel, Frans Marselaer, in 1605 of his nephew Hieronymys Francken II (Rombouts/Van Lerius 1872/1961). He died in Antwerp, probably on 16 October 1618.

== Work ==
Ambrosius Francken I is known for religious works and historical allegories. He made large altarpieces for churches in Antwerp that replaced the many artworks that had disappeared during the iconoclastic fervour of the Beeldenstorm a few decades before. His compositions depicting muscular figures based on classical prototypes exercised an important influence on contemporary artists.

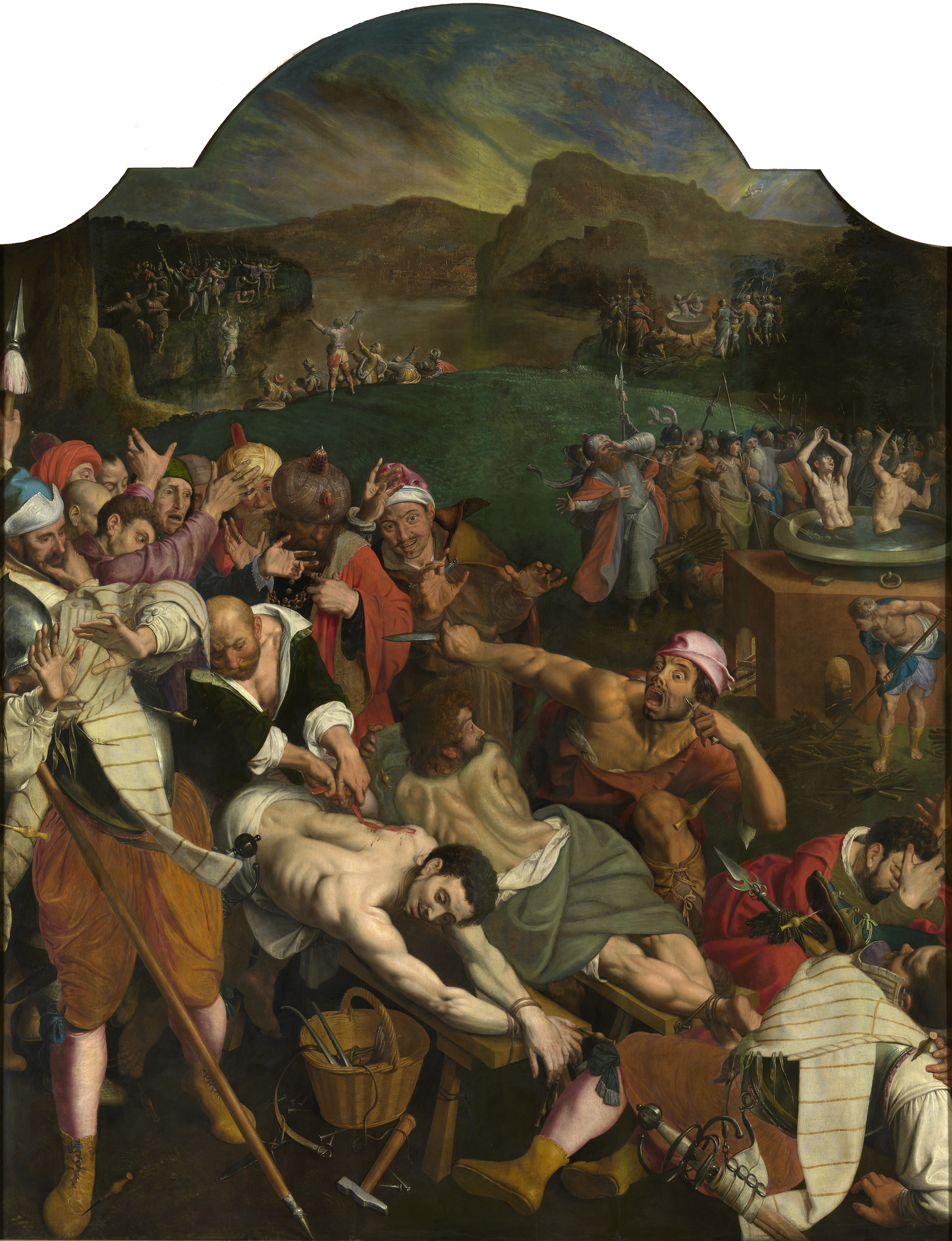
Martyrdom of the Saints Crispin and Crispinian of Soissons

His style shows the influence of Maerten de Vos in the opulently draped robes and other details. He occasionally painted the staffage in the landscapes of Abraham Govaerts.

Many of his works that have survived depict martyrdoms, a theme popular in Counter-Reformation Flanders. One of his important commissions was the painting of the triptych for the Guild of Barbers and Surgeons in 1590. One of the wings of the triptych depicts the miracles of the Saints Cosmas and Damian. The saints' most famous miraculous exploit was the grafting of a leg from a recently deceased Ethiopian to replace a patient's ulcered or cancerous leg. Unlike earlier representations of the subject which accentuate the role of the divine by including angels, a halo around the saints' heads and the role of the peaceful sleep of the patient receiving the transplant, Ambrosius' composition dwells more on the technique of the amputation and also shows the patient as a normal person whose face is distorted in pain. The saints have no nimbus and do not have help of angels. They use their own hands and their instruments are lying on the floor and are clearly recognizable. The depiction is more naturalistic than the earlier representations as it discounts the miraculous and makes the technical procedure take centre stage.

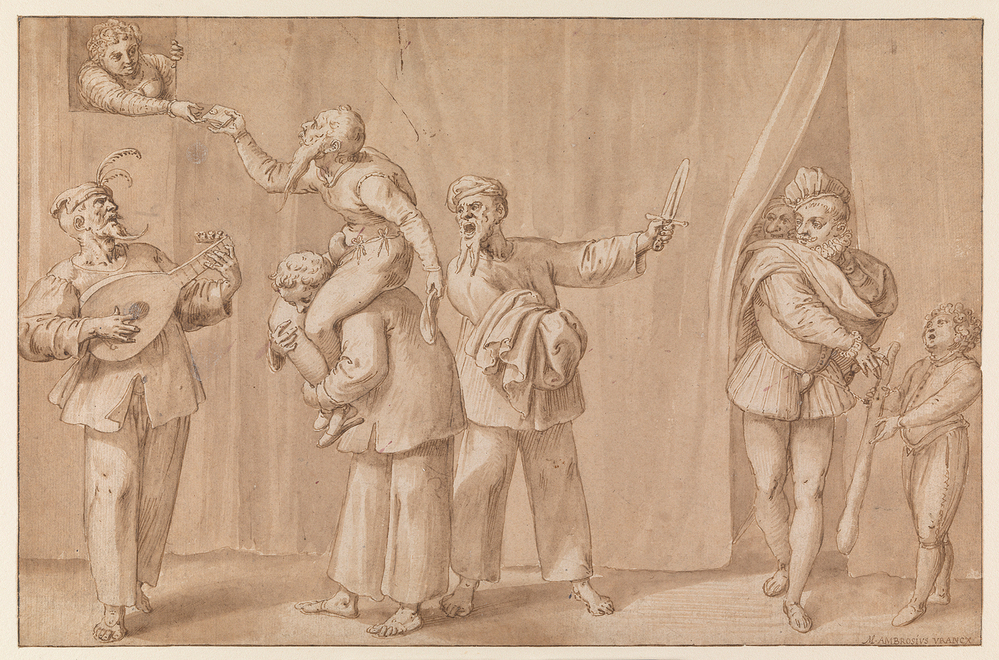
Pantalone handing over a love letter

During his Calvinist period (roughly 1579 to 1585) Ambrosius was responsible for a set of engravings called The Fate of Mankind that strongly criticised, even ridiculed, the Catholic clergy.

Very few of his drawings have survived. Some drawings of scenes from the commedia dell’arte (including a drawing at the Amsterdam Museum) that are ascribed to Ambrosius I are interesting and show commedia dell'arte performances that he may have seen while residing in Fontainebleau in the 1570s. It is possible the drawing was initially planned for a print project which eventually was not realized. He also provided designs for print projects in Antwerp including for a picture bible published in Antwerp between 1579 and 1585. In 1578 he designed a series on the theme of The Fate of Man, which comprised three prints: Vanitas, Casus Hominis, and Exitatio Hominis. In the same year he made the designs for a series of the Eight Virtues.

== Family tree ==
Francken family tree

Nicolaes Francken; 1515–1596
Hieronymus Francken I 1540–1610	Frans Francken I 1542–1616	Ambrosius Francken I 1544–1618	(Cornelius Francken)
Isabella Francken	Thomas Francken; 1574–1625	Hieronymus Francken II; 1578–1623	Frans Francken II; 1581–1642	Ambrosius Francken II; 1590–1632	Hans Francken; 1581–after 1610
Frans Francken III; 1607–1667	Hieronymus Francken III; 1611–after 1661	Ambrosius Francken III; 1614–1662
Constantijn Francken; 1661–1717
