= Hieronymus Francken III =

Flemish painter

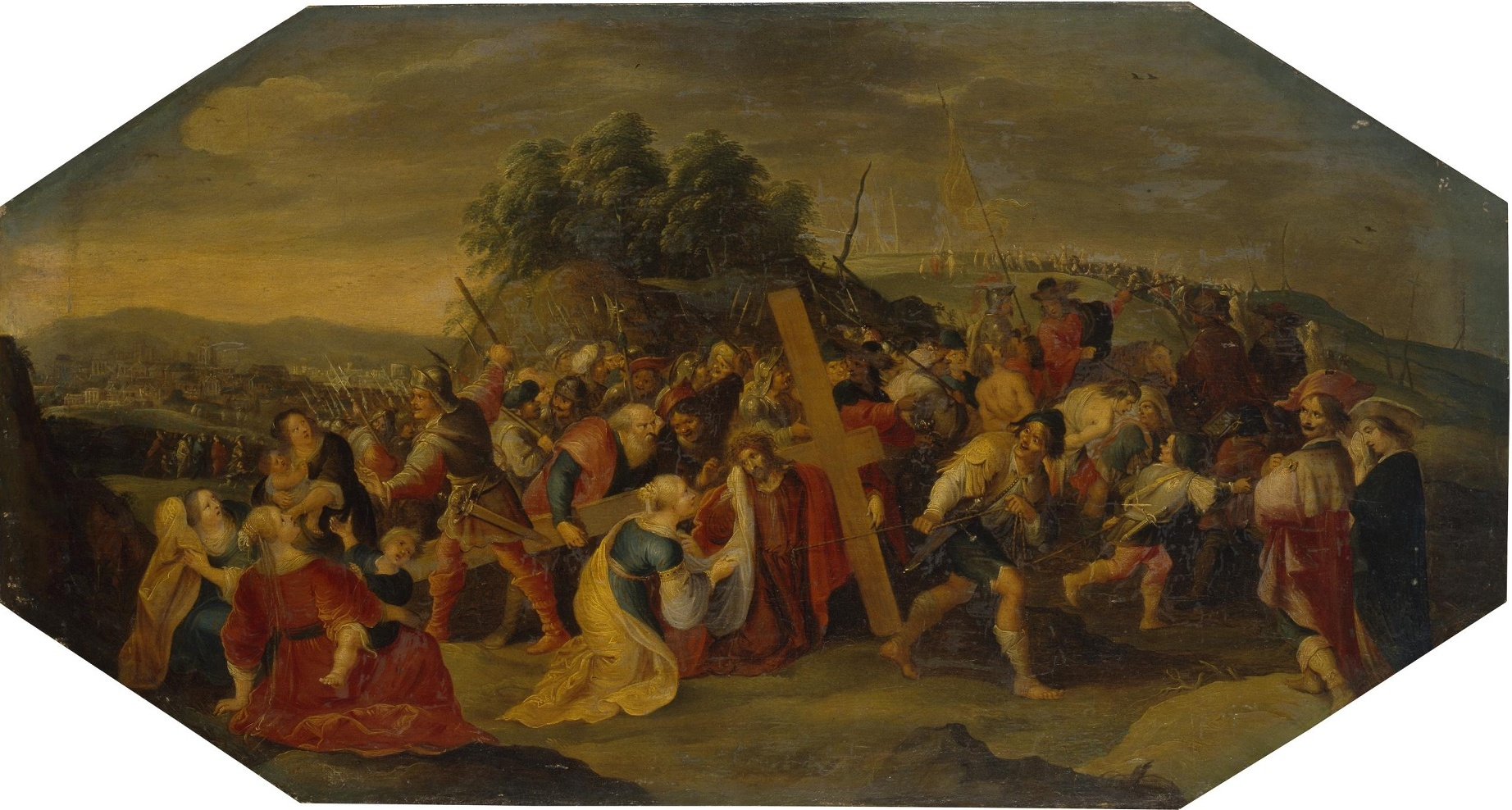
- Carrying the Cross, 1650s
- Born: 1611; Antwerp, Belgium
- Died: 1671 (aged 59–60); Antwerp, Belgium
- Occupation: Painter
- Spouse: Cornelia Deep
- Children: 1, including Constantijn
- Father: Frans Francken the Younger

Hieronymus Francken III (1611 in Antwerp – 1671 in Antwerp), was a Flemish Baroque painter and a well known member of the Francken family of artists.

== Life ==
He was the son of Frans Francken II and Elisabeth Placquet and painted in the family tradition of religious works and historical allegories. He was the father of Constantijn Francken but he died before he could teach him to paint.

== Family tree ==
Francken family tree

Nicolaes Francken; 1515–1596
Hieronymus Francken I 1540–1610	Frans Francken I 1542–1616	Ambrosius Francken I 1544–1618	(Cornelius Francken)
Isabella Francken	Thomas Francken; 1574–1625	Hieronymus Francken II; 1578–1623	Frans Francken II; 1581–1642	Ambrosius Francken II; 1590–1632	Hans Francken; 1581–after 1610
Frans Francken III; 1607–1667	Hieronymus Francken III; 1611–after 1661	Ambrosius Francken III; 1614–1662
Constantijn Francken; 1661–1717
