= Hieronymus Francken II =

Flemish painter

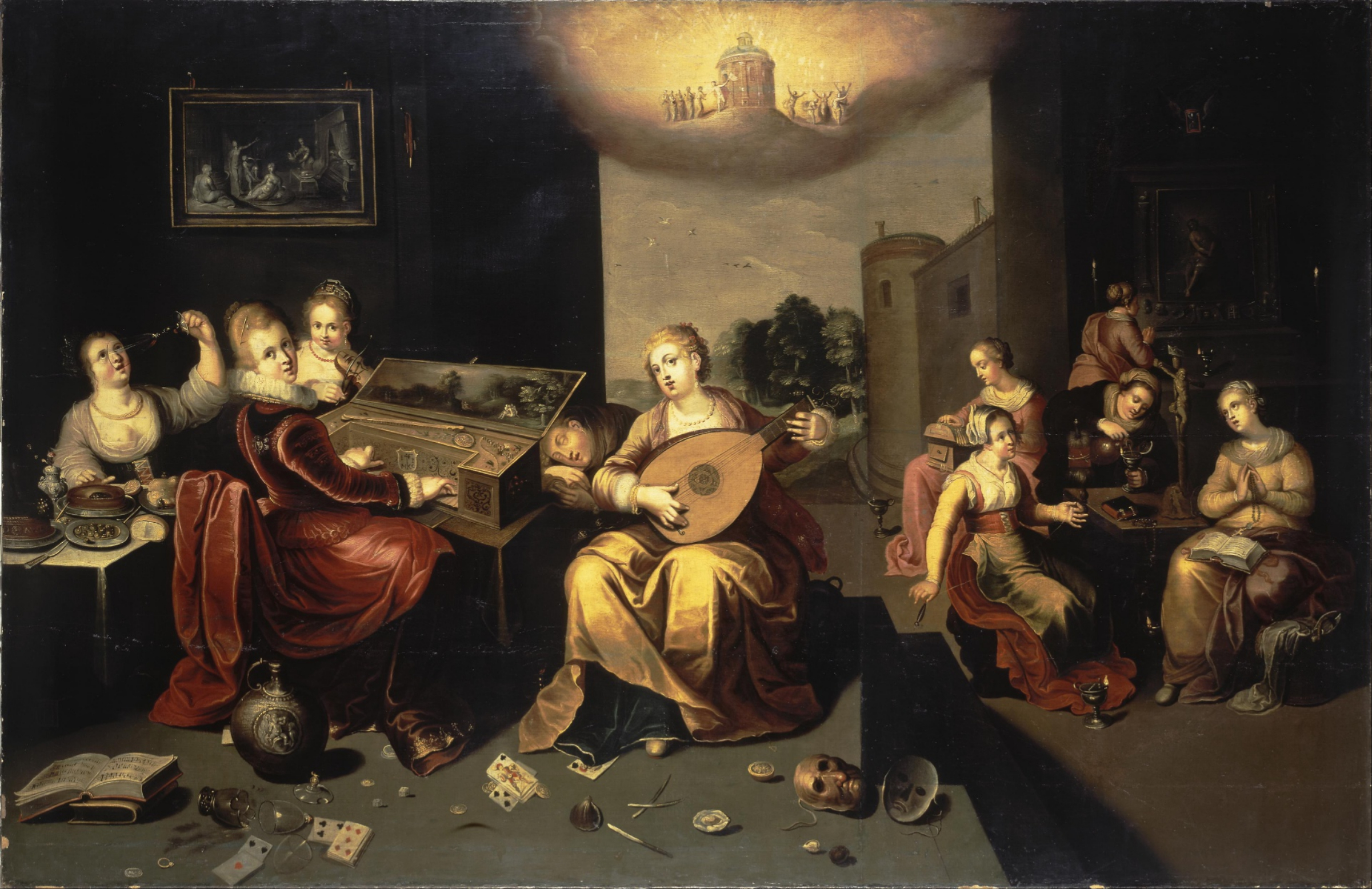
Parable of the Ten Virgins, c. 1616

Hieronymus Francken the Younger or Hieronymus II (Antwerp, 1578 – Antwerp, 1623) was a Flemish painter and one of the most prominent members of the large Francken family of artists. Along with his brother Frans Francken II he played an important role in the development of new genres in Flemish art in the early 17th century. He was a prolific artist with a wide range who painted religious scenes, allegorical subjects, portraits, fruit pieces, genre scenes, architectural paintings and art galleries.

== Life ==
Hieronymus Francken II was the son of Elisabeth Mertens and Frans Francken the Elder. His father was a painter born in Herentals who had moved with his painter father to Antwerp. There he had become one of the principal painters during the Counter-Reformation. Hieronymus had three brothers who were painters: Thomas, Frans II and Ambrosius II.

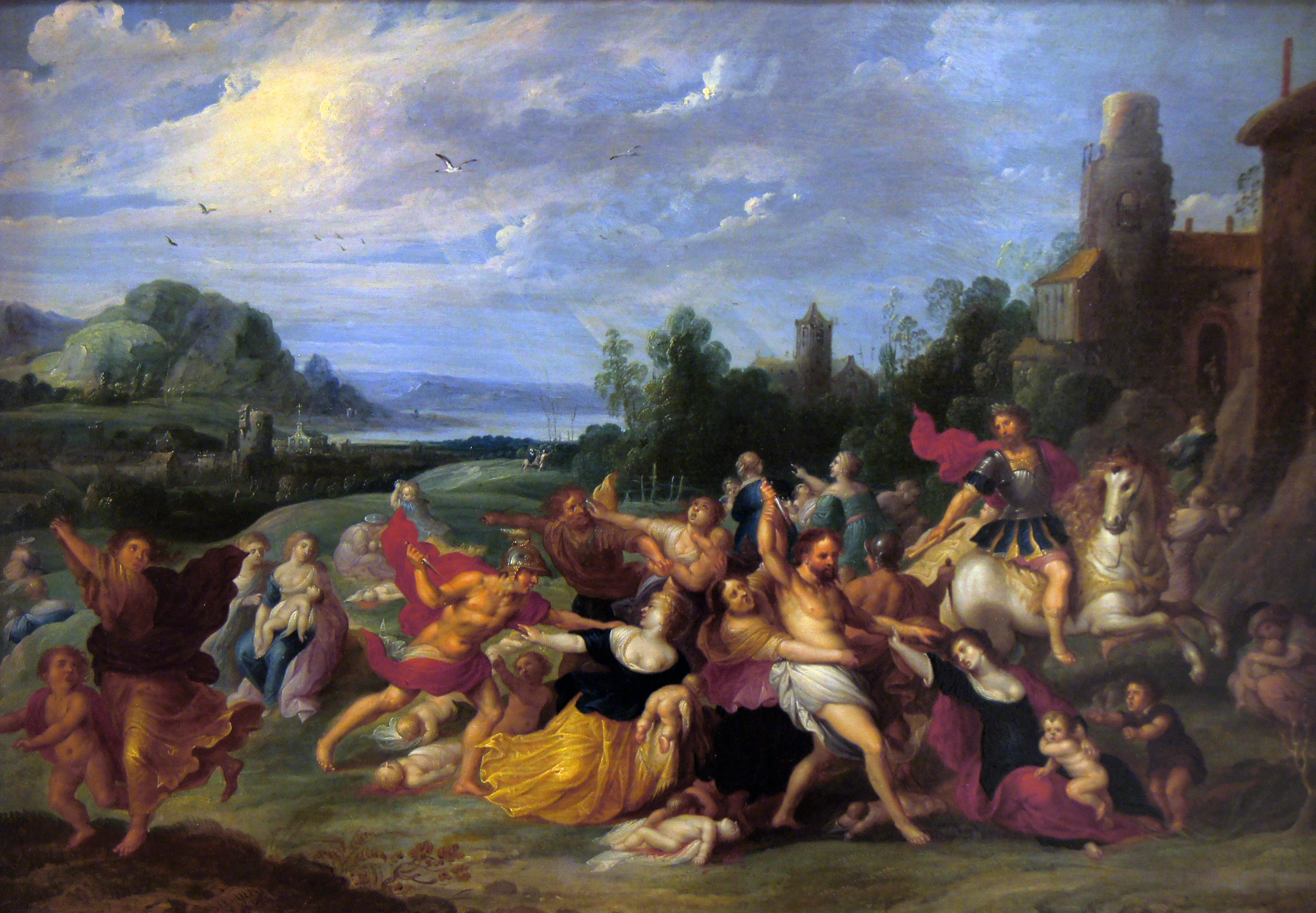
The massacre of the innocent

Hieronymus received his first training from his father. He was entered into the books (liggeren) of the Antwerp Guild of Saint Luke in 1605 as a pupil of his uncle Ambrosius. Ambrosius Francken I had trained with Frans Floris and had worked some time in Fontainebleau. In 1607 Hieronymus Francken II was formally admitted as a master of the Antwerp Guild.

In 1609 he likely spent time in Paris, where like his brother Frans II, he may have studied under his uncle Hieronymus Francken I. Hieronymus Francken I worked most of his career in Paris and Fontainebleau and was a court painter to the French court from 1594.

Hieronymus Francken II returned to Antwerp where he spent the rest of his career. From 1616/17 he worked as "ionckmann" (bachelor) in the house of his father Frans Francken I (1542–1616). He became in 1618 a consultor of the 'Sodaliteit van de bejaerde jongmans' (Sodality of the Unmarried Men of Age), a fraternity for bachelors established by the Jesuit order. He became an assistant of the Sodality in 1619, a prefect in September 1620 and a consultor for the second time in September 1622. This suggests that he never married.

== Work ==
Hieronymus Francken the Younger was a versatile artist who practised in many genres. Hieronymus painted art galleries and Kunstkammer, genre scenes of elegant balls and dances, history paintings, monkey scenes (the so-called singeries), allegorical paintings and still lifes. He also copied some of the scenes of witches and witchcraft, including portrayals of witches' sabbats, invented by his brother Frans II.

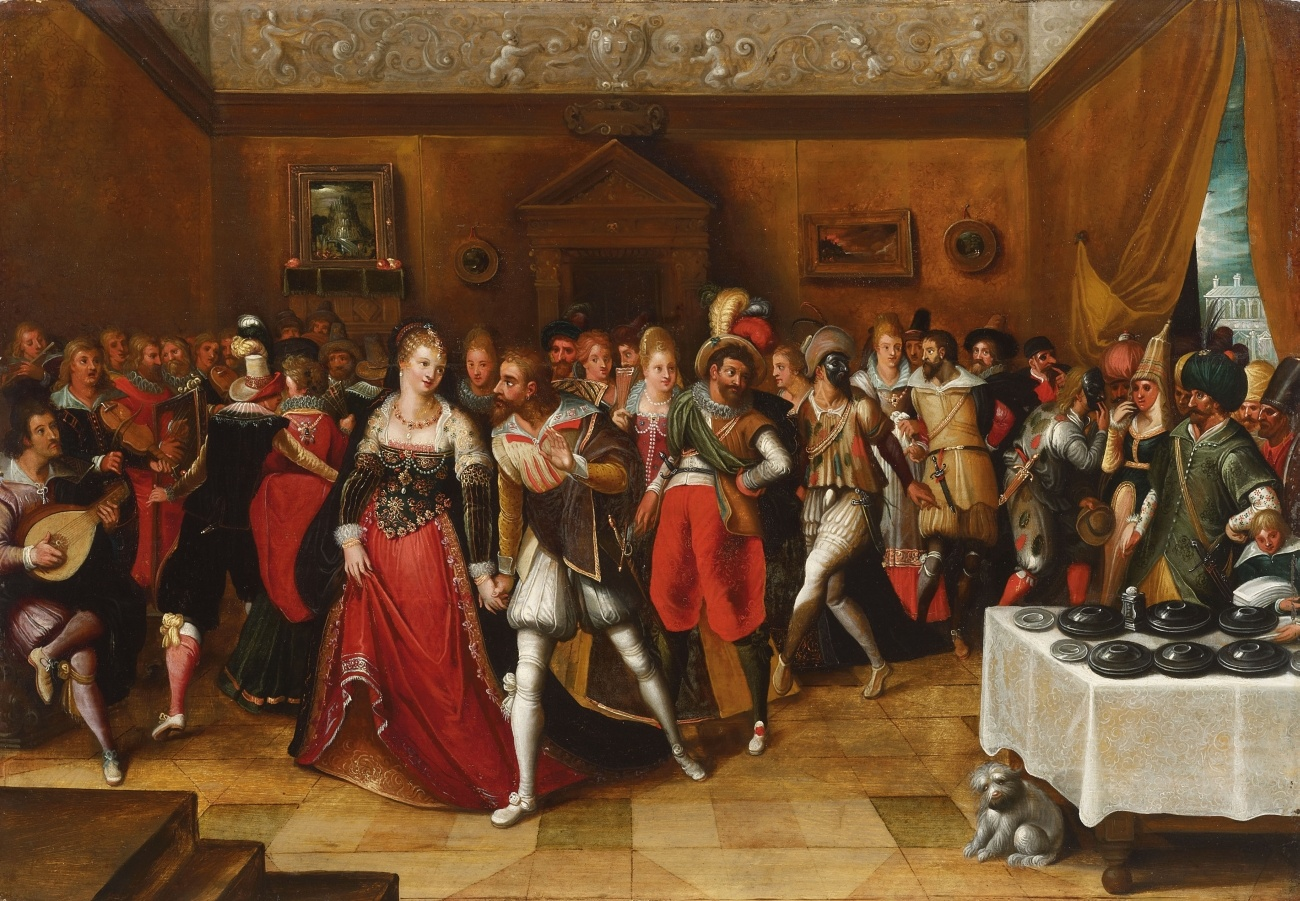
Festive Company

As the paintings of various members of the Francken family were so similar in style and they rarely signed their work, it has been difficult for a long time to identify the works by Hieronymus II. In particular the works of Hieronymus II and Frans II have been difficult to distinguish as they had a similar training and worked in close proximity and as a result their figure style and subject matter is very similar. Various works of Hieronymus II were in the past attributed to his brother. On the basis of the few signed works by his hand historians have been able to reconstruct Hieronymus' oeuvre and re-attribute to him a number of works.

Typical characteristics of Hieronymus' work are the use of broad brush strokes and earth colours, such as brick-red and variations of brown tones. The scale of his figures is occasionally awkward.

=== Elegant balls ===
Hieronymus as well as his brother Frans the Younger created many paintings depicting elegant balls. They typically represent anonymous events where couples or larger groups of elegant persons are dancing on music in an interior. It is possible that the brothers developed this subject under the influence of their uncle Hieronymus Francken I under whom they may have studied briefly during a presumed residence in Paris. Hieronymus I had developed this genre of elegant balls while working for the French court in Fontainebleau and Paris. The execution of these works by both brothers is similar in style.

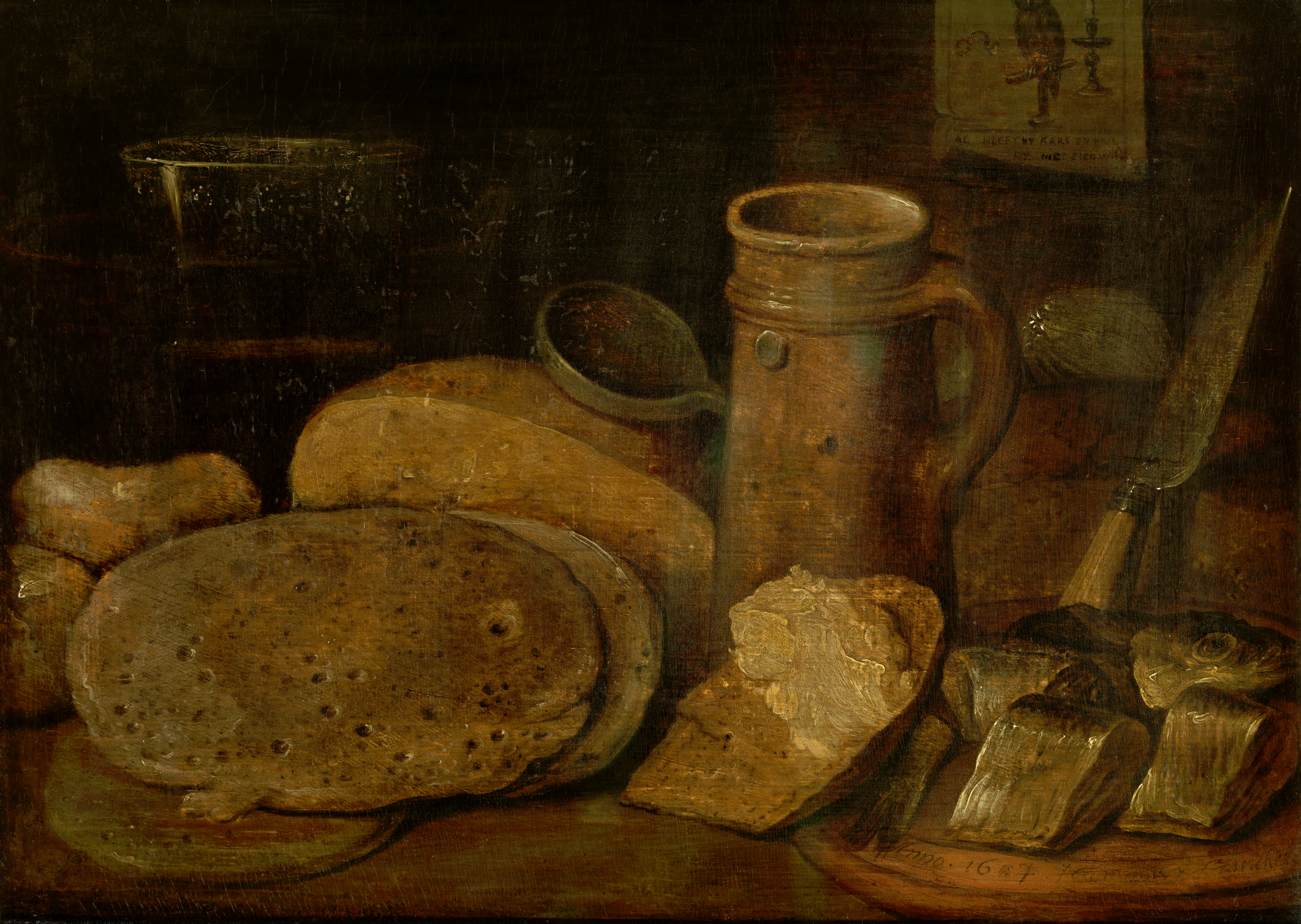
Rich and the Poor at Table

The architecture in these paintings was occasionally the work of another painter such as Paul Vredeman de Vries in the case of the work Elegant company in the Kunsthistorisches Museum.

=== Still lifes ===
Some of the most original work of Hieronymus II was in the area of still lifes. He specialized in monochrome banquet still lifes typically of simple food and pottery. Gradually an oeuvre is being ascribed to him on the basis of his sole signed still life referred to as Still life with pottery, herring and pancakes, a print of an owl on the wall or Rich and the Poor at Table in the collection of the Royal Museum of Fine Arts Antwerp dated 1604.

Another still life in the Royal Museum of Fine Arts Antwerp referred to as the Poor Man's Meal has been attributed to Hieronymus II. A very similar work was sold at Christie's on 17 May 2004 in Amsterdam as lot 72. There exists a third similar work in a private collection. It is believed that this composition Poor Man's Meal is a pendant to a composition representing a Rich Man's Meal of which there is only one copy preserved in a private collection.

=== Gallery paintings ===
Frans Francken the Younger and Jan Brueghel the Elder were the first artists to create paintings of art and curiosity collections in the 1620s. Gallery paintings depict large rooms in which many paintings and other precious items are displayed in elegant surroundings. The earliest works in this genre depicted art objects together with other items such as scientific instruments or peculiar natural specimens. Some gallery paintings include portraits of the owners or collectors of the art objects or artists at work. The genre became immediately quite popular and was followed by other artists such as Jan Brueghel the Younger, Cornelis de Baellieur, Hans Jordaens, David Teniers the Younger, Gillis van Tilborch and Hieronymus Janssens.

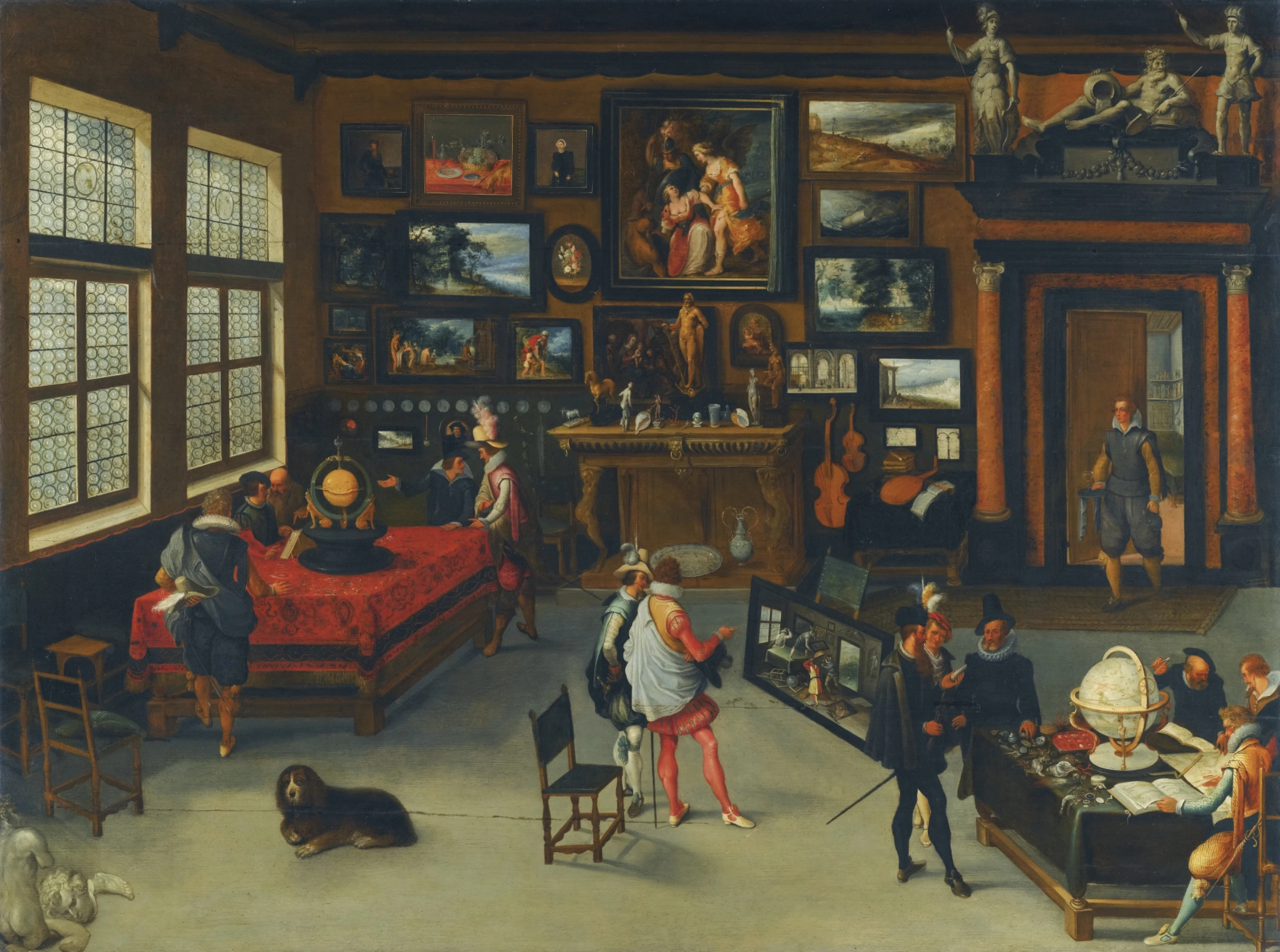
Collector's Cabinet

Hieronymus II created a number of gallery paintings. Only one of these, the composition referred to as The Cabinet of an Art Lover or The Art Gallery of Jan Snellinck (Royal Museums of Fine Arts of Belgium) is signed and dated 1621. This painting has been the basis for the attribution to Hieronymus of a number of gallery paintings formerly attributed to other artists such as his brother Frans II and Adriaen van Stalbemt. The best known of these pictures is The Archdukes Albert and Isabella Visiting a Collector's Cabinet, which is now generally regarded as a collaboration between Jan Brueghel the Elder and Hieronymus Francken II even though some see the hand of van Stalbemt here too. It is part of the collection of The Walters Art Museum in Baltimore, Maryland. Other cabinet paintings that were formerly attributed to van Stalbemt have also been re-attributed to Hieronymus. This includes the composition The Sciences and Arts and the reduced replica of the lower right hand corner called The Geographer and the Naturalist (both in the Prado). A Collector's Cabinet, which is similar to the paintings in the Prado, was sold at Sotheby's on 9 July 2014 as lot 57. What the three compositions The Archdukes Albert and Isabella Visiting a Collector's Cabinet, The Sciences and Arts and A Collector's Cabinet have in common is that they give prominence among the artworks included in the gallery painting to compositions that are allegories of iconoclasm and the victory of painting (art) over ignorance. These are references to the iconoclasm of the Beeldenstorm that had raged in the Low Countries in the 16th century and the victory over the iconoclasts during the reign of the Archdukes Albert and Isabella who jointly ruled the Spanish Netherlands in the beginning of the 17th century.

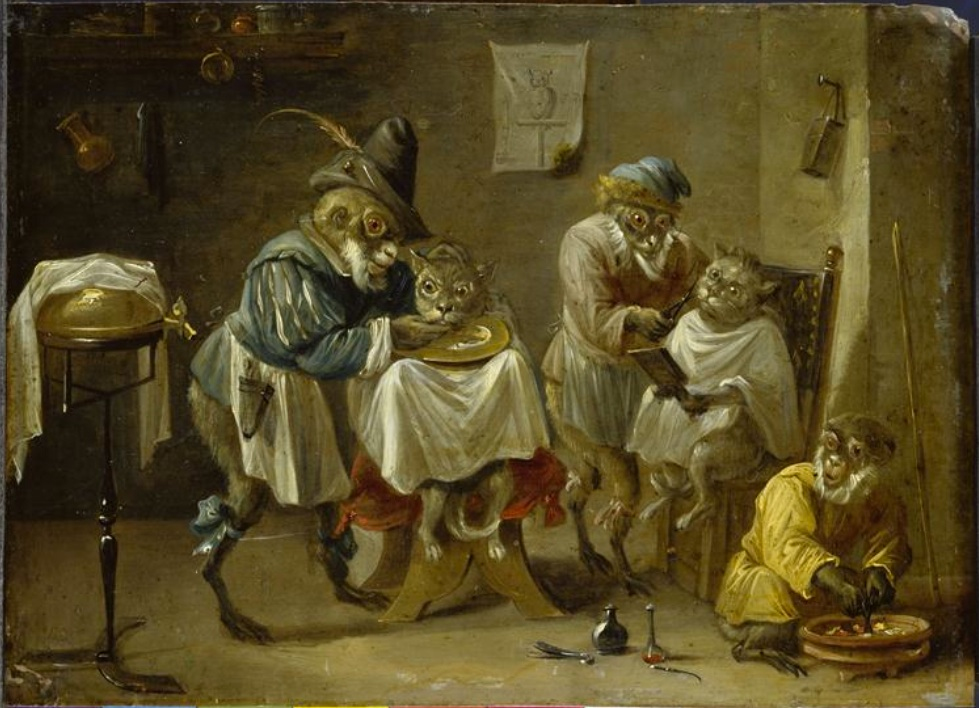
Bathroom with monkeys and cats

Hieronymus' gallery paintings represent the early phase of the genre of collector's cabinets. During this early 'encyclopaedic' phase, the genre reflected the culture of curiosity of that time, when art works, scientific instruments, naturalia and artificialia were equally the object of study and admiration. As a result, the cabinets depicted in these compositions are populated by persons who appear to be as interested in discussing scientific instruments as in admiring paintings. Later the genre concentrated more on galleries solely containing works of art. Even though one of Hieronymus' gallery paintings was earlier believed to represent the real art gallery of the Flemish artist and collector Jan Snellinck it is now believed that all his galleries are in fact imaginary.

The identity of the painters who painted the figures in Hieronymus' gallery pictures is not known.

=== Singeries ===
Hieronymus' brother Frans the Younger had contributed to the development of the genre of the 'monkey scene', also called 'singerie' (a word, which in French means a 'comical grimace, behaviour or trick'). Comical scenes with monkeys appearing in human attire and a human environment are a pictorial genre that was initiated in Flemish painting in the 16th century and was subsequently further developed in the 17th century. The Flemish engraver Pieter van der Borcht introduced the singerie as an independent theme around 1575 in a series of prints, which are strongly embedded in the artistic tradition of Pieter Bruegel the Elder. These prints were widely disseminated and the theme was then picked up by other Flemish artists. The first one to do so was Frans Francken the Younger who played an important role in the development of the genre. David Teniers the Younger became the principal practitioner of the genre and developed it further with his younger brother Abraham Teniers. Later in the 17th century Nicolaes van Verendael started to paint these 'monkey scenes' as well.

Like his brother, Hieronymus II is known to have created singeries such as the Bathroom with monkeys and cats (Staatliches Museum Schwerin).

== Family tree ==
Francken family tree

Nicolaes Francken; 1515–1596
Hieronymus Francken I 1540–1610	Frans Francken I 1542–1616	Ambrosius Francken I 1544–1618	(Cornelius Francken)
Isabella Francken	Thomas Francken; 1574–1625	Hieronymus Francken II; 1578–1623	Frans Francken II; 1581–1642	Ambrosius Francken II; 1590–1632	Hans Francken; 1581–after 1610
Frans Francken III; 1607–1667	Hieronymus Francken III; 1611–after 1661	Ambrosius Francken III; 1614–1662
Constantijn Francken; 1661–1717
