= Frans Francken the Elder =

Flemish painter (1542–1616)

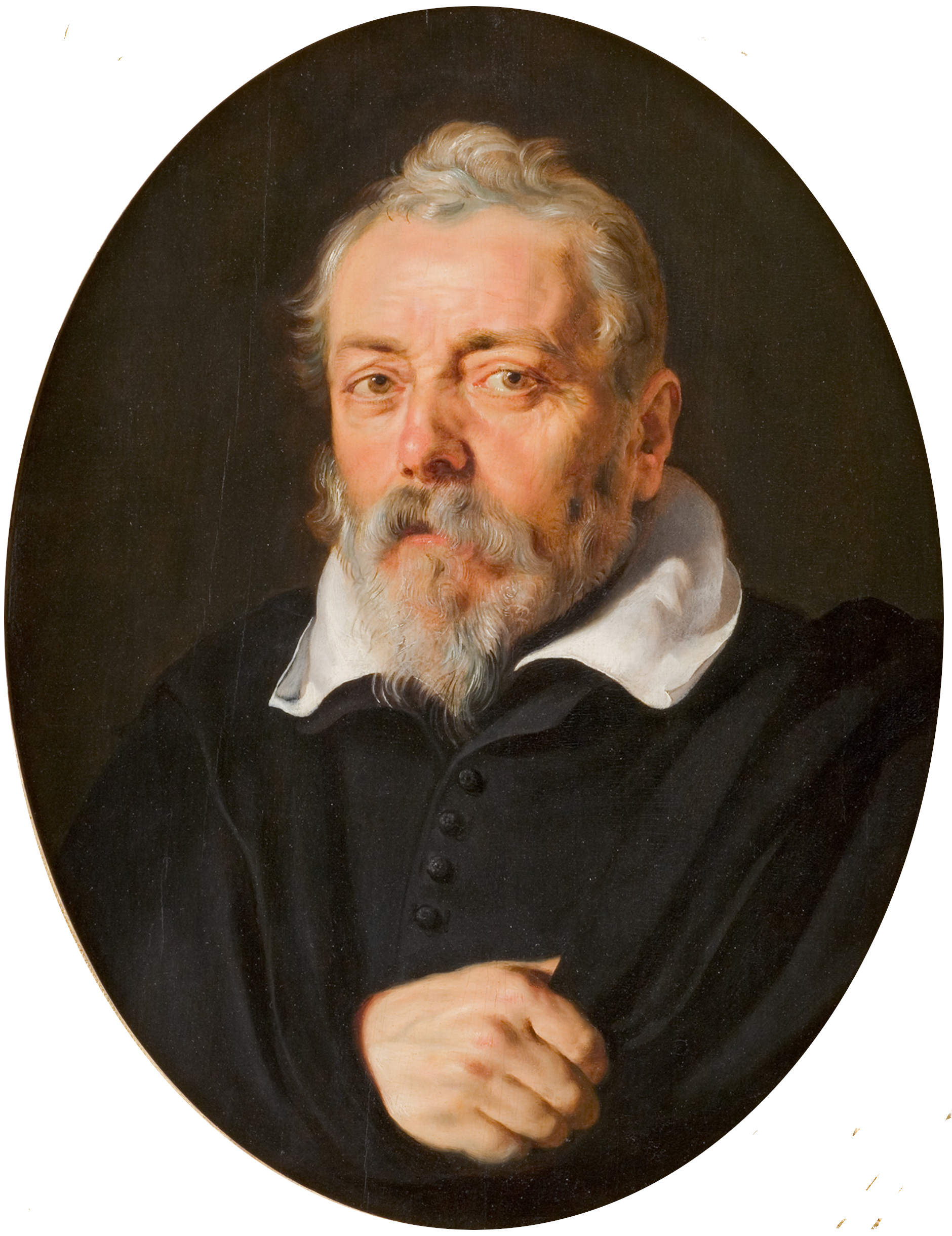
Frans Francken by Rubens

Frans Francken I or Frans Francken the Elder (1542–1616) was a Flemish painter who was one of the principal painters in Antwerp during the Counter-Reformation. He is mainly known for his large altarpieces and allegorical paintings. He was a member of the Francken dynasty of painters that played an important role in the Antwerp art scene in the late 16th century and the 17th century.

== Life ==
Francken was born in Herentals as the son of Nicholas Francken, an obscure painter from Herentals. His father later settled in Antwerp and was likely his first teacher. He became a master of the Antwerp Guild of St. Luke in 1567 and was its deacon in 1587. His younger brothers Hieronymus Francken I and Ambrosius Francken I both became successful painters. The early biographer Karel van Mander wrote that Frans Francken the Elder was a pupil of the leading Antwerp Romanist painter Frans Floris. The Romanists were Netherlandish painters who had typically travelled to Italy to study the works of leading Italian High Renaissance artists such as Michelangelo, Raphael and their followers. Their art assimilated these Italian influences into the Northern painting tradition.

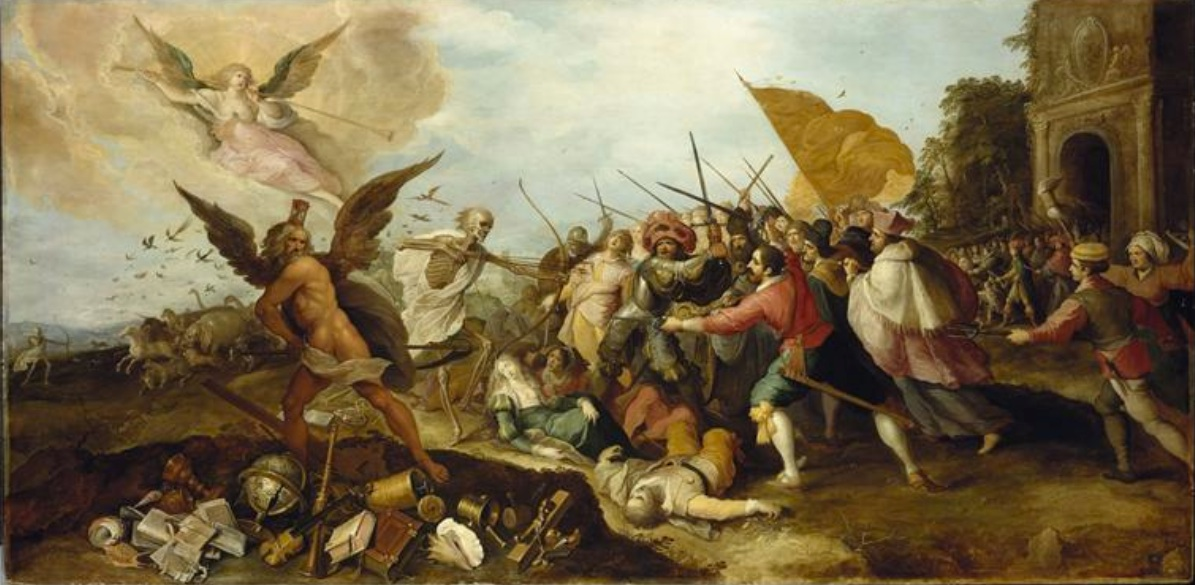
The Battle of Time against Death

In 1571 he collaborated with his older brother Hieronymus on a large Adoration of the Magi triptych (Brussels, Royal Museums of Fine Arts of Belgium and London, Brompton Oratory) which bears his monogram as well as that of his brother Hieronymus. The brothers included self-portraits in profile: Hieronymus on the left side and Frans on the right side of the triptych.

Frans Francken married Elisabeth Mertens. The couple had many children, of whom at the time of his death in 1619 six were still alive: Thomas ( b Antwerp, 28 Feb 1574; d Antwerp, c. 1625 ), Frans, Hieronymus, Ambrosius II ( b Antwerp, c. 1590; d Antwerp, bur 8 Aug 1632 ), Magdalena and Elisabeth. The four sons all became painters.

His pupils included his son Frans, Gortzius Geldorp, Herman van der Mast and Jan de Wael.

He died in Antwerp in 1616.

== Work ==
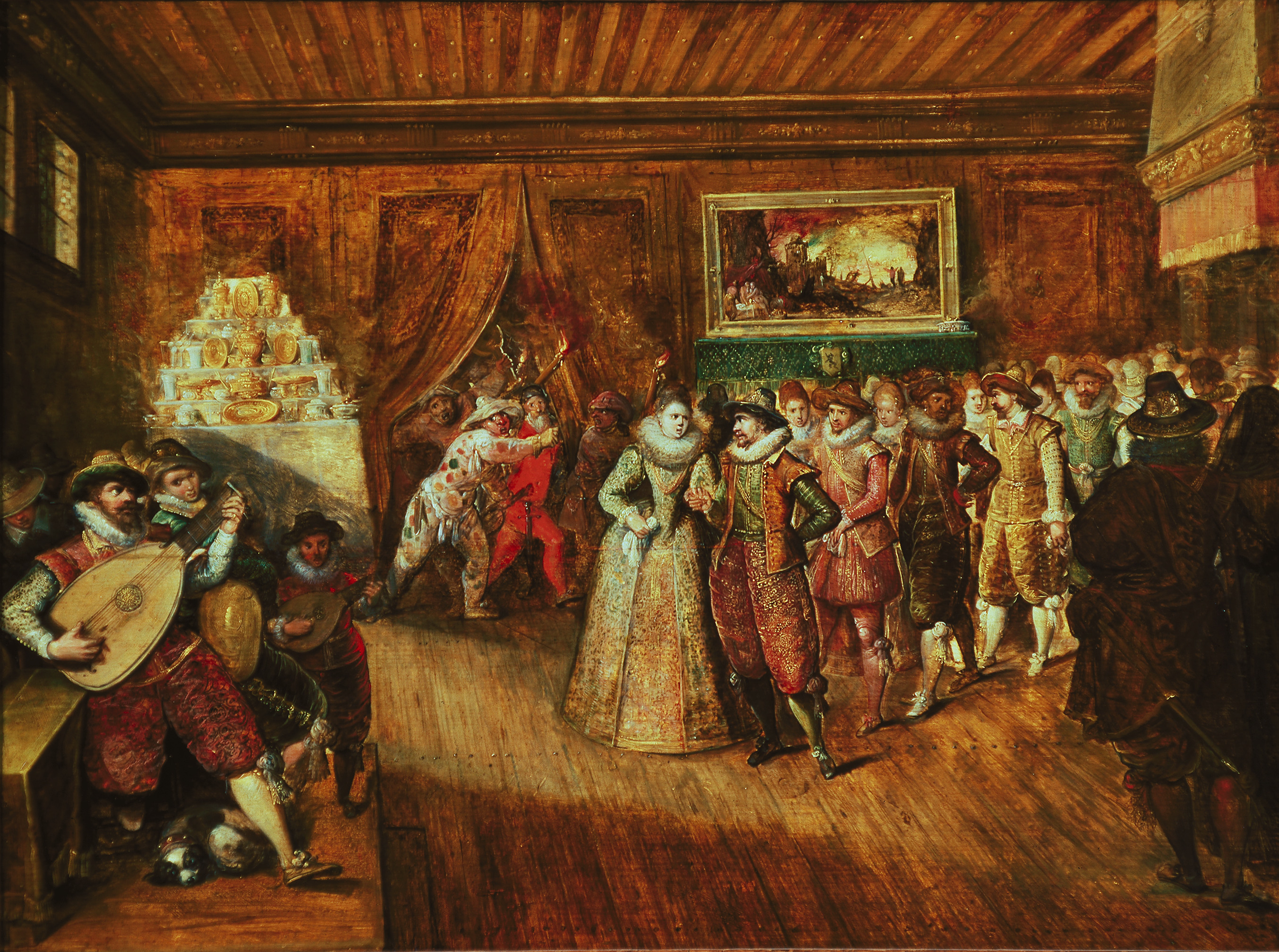
Wedding Dance

Frans Francken the Elder worked mainly on altar pieces as there was a great demand for such works as a result of the iconoclasm of the Calvinists. His masterpiece is a triptych entitled Christ among the Scribes, which was made for the Antwerp Cathedral in 1587. The figures are rather wooden in the late Mannerist style. However, the heads show the artist's skill for portraiture. Frans Francken I was also a portrait painter and a few court portraits have been attributed to him.

His earliest paintings were in the style of Frans Floris but after 1600 he developed his own style which displayed classicising characteristics not unlike those in the work of Otto van Veen.

Frans Francken the Elder painted small-scale cabinet pictures, a genre in which his sons Frans and Hieronymus would excel. He was further known for his allegorical paintings and his son Frans would continue this tradition. An example of an allegorical painting is The Battle of Time against Death in the Bayerische Staatsgemäldesammlungen.

== Family tree ==
Francken family tree

Nicolaes Francken; 1515–1596
Hieronymus Francken I 1540–1610	Frans Francken I 1542–1616	Ambrosius Francken I 1544–1618	(Cornelius Francken)
Isabella Francken	Thomas Francken; 1574–1625	Hieronymus Francken II; 1578–1623	Frans Francken II; 1581–1642	Ambrosius Francken II; 1590–1632	Hans Francken; 1581–after 1610
Frans Francken III; 1607–1667	Hieronymus Francken III; 1611–after 1661	Ambrosius Francken III; 1614–1662
Constantijn Francken; 1661–1717
