= Hieronymus Francken I =

Flemish painter (c.1540–1610)

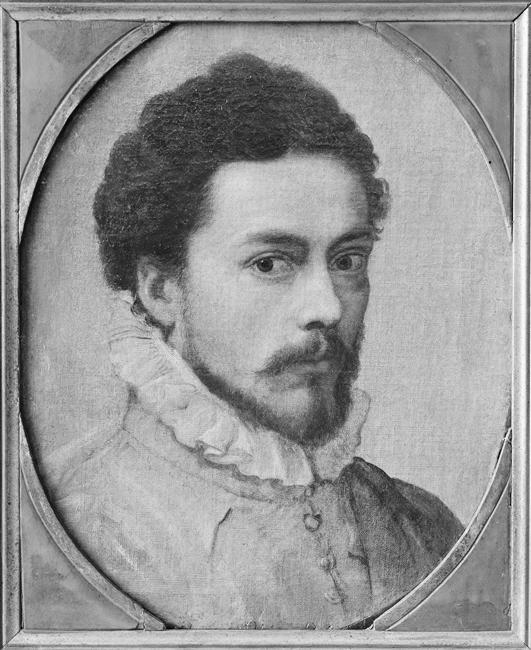
Self-portrait, c. 1583

Hieronymus Francken I or Hieronymus Francken the Elder (ca. 1540, Herentals – 1610, Paris) was a Flemish painter and an important member of the Francken family of artists. After training in Antwerp, he was mainly active in France, where he became court painter at the French court. His compositions with elegant groups of dancing figures, musicians and courtiers anticipate the development of this genre in the 17th century.

== Life ==
Hieronymus Francken I was born in Herentals as the son of Nicolaes Francken, a painter from Herentals. His father later settled in Antwerp and was likely his first teacher. His brothers Frans Francken I and Ambrosius Francken I both became successful painters.

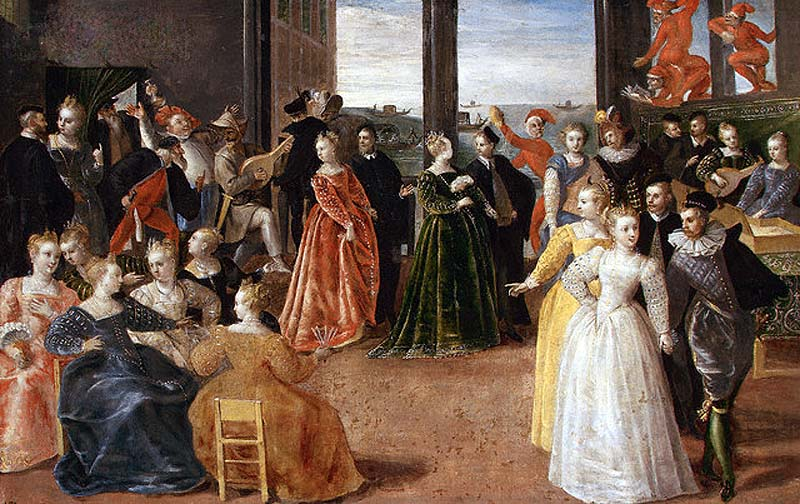
Carnival in Venice, c. 1565

According to the early 17th century biographer Karel van Mander, who referred to him three times using three different names, i.e. Ieroon Francken van Herenthals, Ieroon Vrancks, and Ieroon Franck, Francken was a pupil of Frans Floris. He probably went to work with Floris in the early 1560s. It is unclear whether he traveled to Italy after his training in Antwerp. Such a trip is suggested by a work of his hand dated 1565 that depicts a scene from the Carnival of Venice (in the Suermondt-Ludwig-Museum in Aachen).

From 1566 to 1572 he was in France where he was one of the masters employed to decorate the Palace of Fontainebleau. Cornelis Floris, the Antwerp architect and brother of Francken's master Frans Floris, sent his son to Paris in 1568 to train with Hieronymus Francken I. Hieronymus became a master in Paris in 1570 and a naturalized French citizen in 1572. This did not stop him from returning to Antwerp regularly. In 1571 he was back in Antwerp to finish the large Adoration of the Magi triptych (Brussels, Royal Museums of Fine Arts of Belgium and London, Brompton Oratory) that Frans Floris had left unfinished when he died in 1570. His younger brother Frans collaborated on this commission. The brothers included self-portraits in profile: Hieronymus on the left side panel and Frans on the right side panel of the triptych.

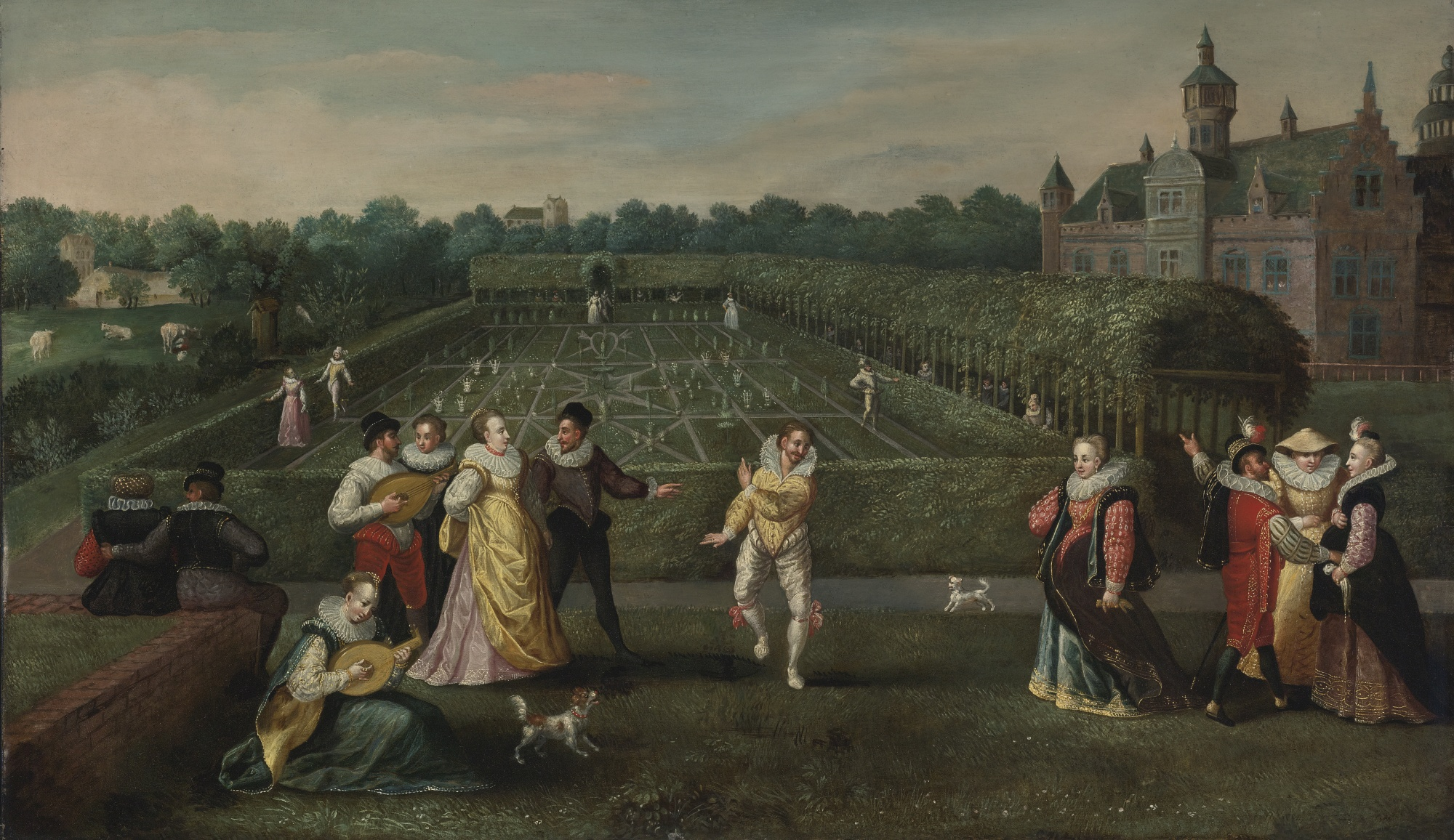
Courtiers strolling in a garden, 1610

In 1574 he is documented in Antwerp. From 1578 until his death Hieronymus lived in Paris and Fontainebleau. In 1578 hes married for the second time. His second wife was Françoise Miraille, the daughter of an Italian embroiderer who was also concierge of Madame de la Roche-sur-Yon in Tournon Street. The couple went on to have seven children. In 1619 four of his children were recorded as still being alive. His daughter Isabella was a history and genre painter. He was successful and frequented higher middle-class circles. It is possibly that he also operated a side business as an art dealer.

In 1585, Hieronymus was commissioned to paint an Adoration of the Shepherds by Jacques-Auguste de Thou of the illustrious French De Thou family. It was made for the no longer extant church of the Cordeliers (now in the Notre-Dame de Paris cathedral). He included a self-portrait as a man holding a lance is on the far left hand side. The patron Jacques-Auguste de Thou is kneeling on the left. Hieronymus was appointed court painter to the French court in 1594. His service at the French court had already started before this date. In the course of his career he served a large number of kings and queens including Louise de Lorraine (in 1578, 1587 and 1588), Henry III of France (in 1583), the Queen-mother Catherine de' Medici (in 1586, 1600 and 1603) and Henry IV of France (in 1603 and 1610) as well as Marie de' Medici (in 1603). Near the end of his life, in 1607, Hieronymus was elevated to the nobility and could from then onwards refer to himself as 'noble homme, peintre du roy' ('nobleman, painter to the king').

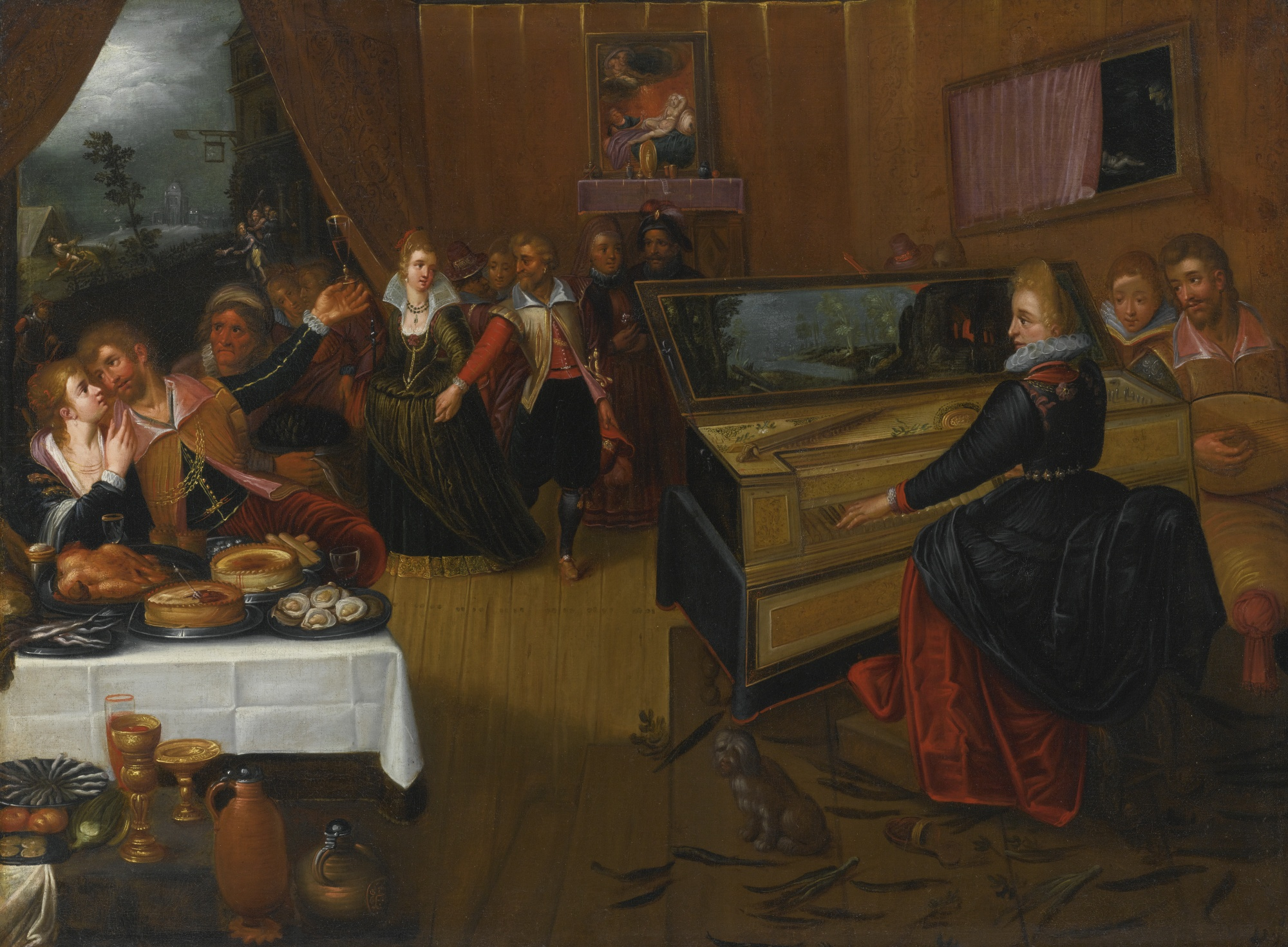
Banquet Scene, An Allegory on Love and Lust, 1555–1610

Hieronymus Francken I was the teacher of Abraham Bloemaert during Bloemaert's short stay in Paris and Fontainebleau from 1581 to 1583.

== Work ==
Hieronymus Francken I painted religious works, that were idealistic and fully in line with 16th-century taste. He also painted allegorical works and groups of dancers at the court. Along with the work of Lodewijk Toeput, these compositions with elegant groups of dancing figures, musicians and courtiers of Francken anticipate the development of this genre in the 17th century, especially in the work of his nephew Frans Francken II.

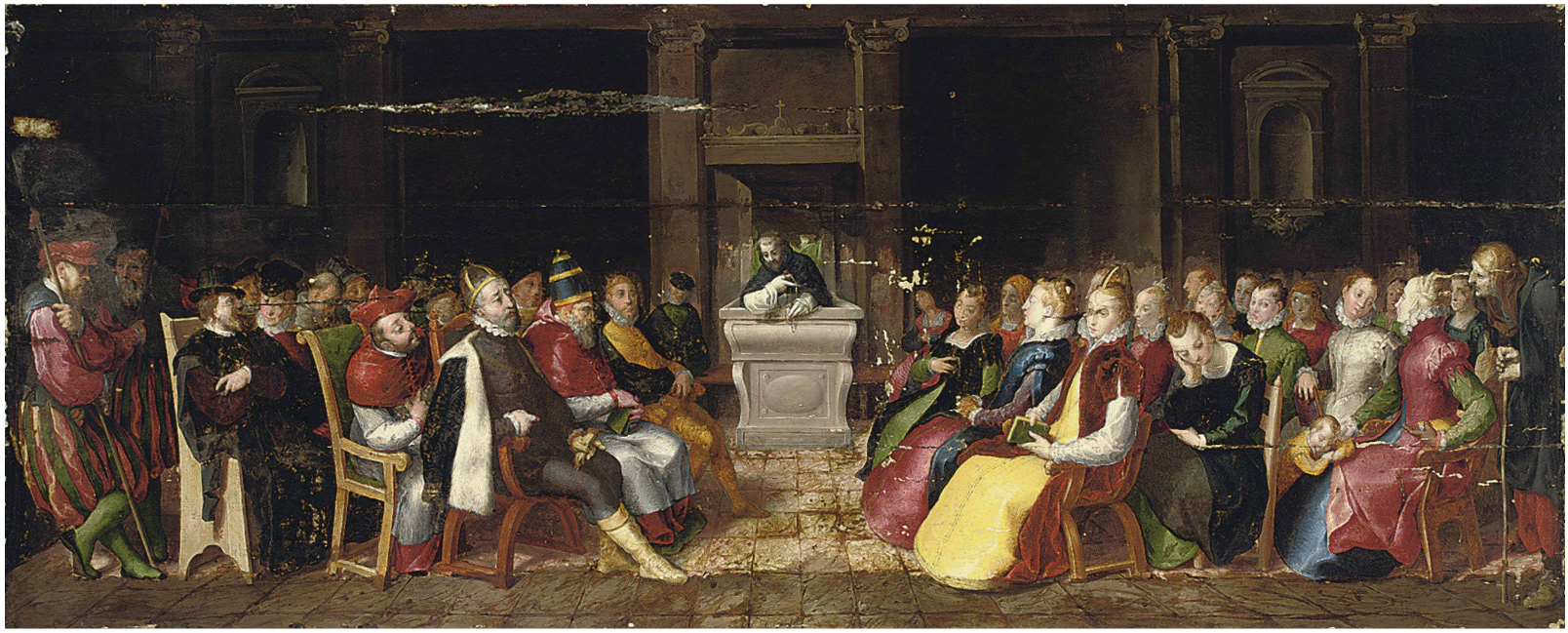
Vanitas, Capriccio of a Dominican preaching to Emperor Charles V, 1583–1610

He also painted portraits. A self-portrait has been preserved and he included self-portraits in various of his history paintings. In 1602, Hieronymus made a group-portrait of the senior merchants, city officers and aldermen of Paris (current location unknown, probably destroyed in 1871).

His paintings are in an elegant Mannerist style and unite elements of the Antwerp, Italian (especially Venetian) and French styles, although the influence of Fontainebleau is the most pronounced.

Hieronymus was much acclaimed for his anatomical drawings, as is confirmed by Philip Galle's series of prints published under the title Instruction et fondements de bien pourtraire. He likely also made designs for prints. A signed Let the children come unto me was engraved by Peeter Baltens but no other print design by his hand is known.

== Family tree ==
Francken family tree

Nicolaes Francken; 1515–1596
Hieronymus Francken I 1540–1610	Frans Francken I 1542–1616	Ambrosius Francken I 1544–1618	(Cornelius Francken)
Isabella Francken	Thomas Francken; 1574–1625	Hieronymus Francken II; 1578–1623	Frans Francken II; 1581–1642	Ambrosius Francken II; 1590–1632	Hans Francken; 1581–after 1610
Frans Francken III; 1607–1667	Hieronymus Francken III; 1611–after 1661	Ambrosius Francken III; 1614–1662
Constantijn Francken; 1661–1717
