= 1637 in art =

Events from the year 1637 in art.

== Events ==
- October 13 – English Royal Navy first-rate ship of the line Sovereign of the Seas is launched at Woolwich Dockyard at a cost of £65,586, adorned from stern to bow with gilded carvings after a design by Anthony van Dyck.
- Claude Lorrain produces a series of etchings of a display of fireworks in Rome.
- Nicolas Poussin begins to paint the first series of Seven Sacraments.

== Works ==
=== Paintings ===
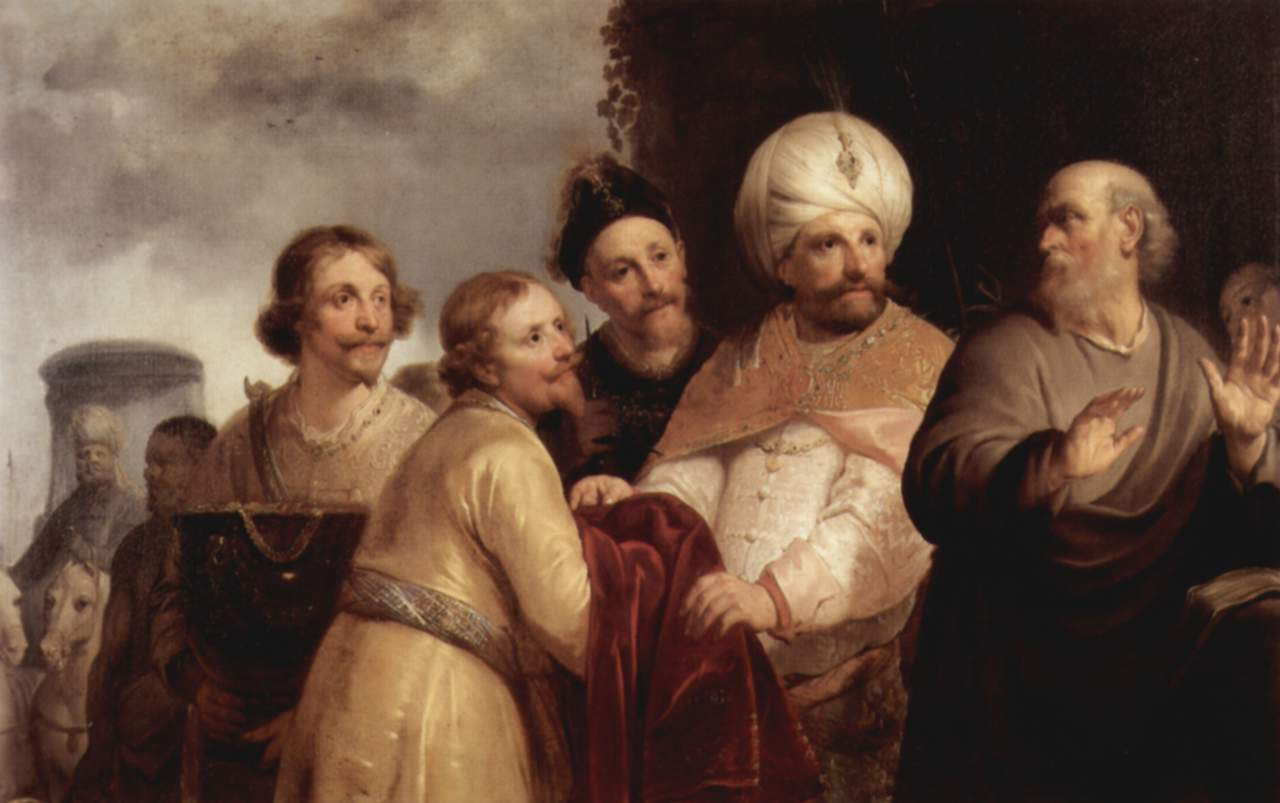
de Grebber, Elisha

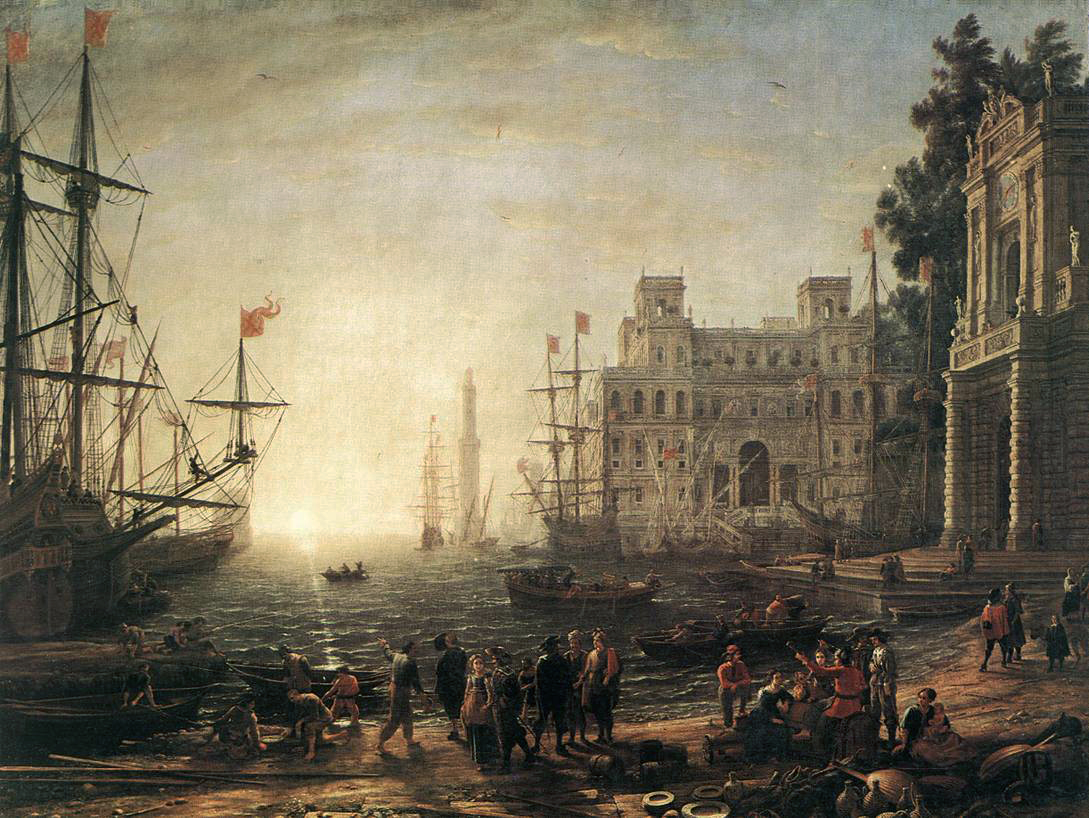
Claude, Seaport
- Cornelis de Baellieur
  - Interior of an Art Gallery
- Claude Lorrain
  - Landscape with a Country Dance
  - Seaport (Villa Medici)
- Pieter de Grebber – Elisha refusing the gifts of Naaman
- Rembrandt – A Polish Nobleman
- Anthony van Dyck – Prince Rupert of the Rhine (approximate date)

=== Sculptures ===
- Bernini – Bust of King Charles I of England

== Births ==
- March 5 – Jan van der Heyden, painter, printmaker and inventor (died 1712)
- April 16 – Jean-Jacques Clérion, French sculptor (died 1714)
- June 25 – Christophe Veyrier, French sculptor (died 1689)
- December 12 – Cesare Gennari, Italian painter (died 1688)
- date unknown
  - Abraham Begeyn, Dutch painter of landscapes and cattle (died 1697)
  - Niccolò Berrettoni, Italian painter (died 1682)
  - Francesco Bonifaccio, Italian painter (d. unknown)
  - Sigismondo Caula, Italian painter (died 1724)
  - Andrea Celesti, Venetian painter (died 1712)
  - Martin Desjardins, French sculptor and stuccoist of Dutch birth (died 1694)
  - Carl Ferdinand Fabritius, German painter (died 1673)
  - Vicente Salvador Gómez, Spanish Baroque painter (died 1678)
  - Giovanni Marracci, Italian painter (died 1704)
  - Giovanni Moneri, Italian painter (died 1714)
  - Pieter Mulier II, Dutch Golden Age painter (died 1701)
  - Michelangelo Palloni, Italian painter (died 1712)
  - Niccola Ricciolini, Italian painter (d. unknown)
  - Girolamo Troppa – Italian painter of the Baroque (died 1710)

== Deaths ==
- January 3 - Daniel Rabel, French painter, engraver, miniaturist, botanist and natural history illustrator (born 1578)
- March 6 - Crispijn van de Passe the Elder, Dutch publisher and engraver (born 1564)
- July 12 – Willem van Haecht, Flemish painter (born 1593)
- September 14 – Theodoor Rombouts, Flemish painter (born 1597)
- December 27 – Vincenzo Giustiniani, art collector, patron of Caravaggio (born 1564)
- date unknown
  - Honami Kōetsu, Japanese craftsman, founder of the Rinpa school (born 1558)
  - Diego de Leyva, Spanish religious painter (born c. 1580)
  - Willem de Passe, Dutch engraver and designer of medals (born 1598)
  - Arent Passer, stonemason and architect (born c. 1560)
  - Domenico Robusti, painter (born 1562)
  - Cornelis Verbeeck – Dutch painter of the Baroque period (born 1590)
