= Poilly (surname) =

Poilly is a surname. Notable people with the surname include:

- François de Poilly or François Poilly (1623–1693), French engraver
- Nicolas Jean Baptiste Poilly (1712–1780), French draftsman and engraver
- Nicolas de Poilly the Younger (1675–1747), French engraver and painter, nephew of François de Poilly
