= The Sciences and the Arts =

Painting by Hieronymous Francken II or Adriaan van Stalbemt

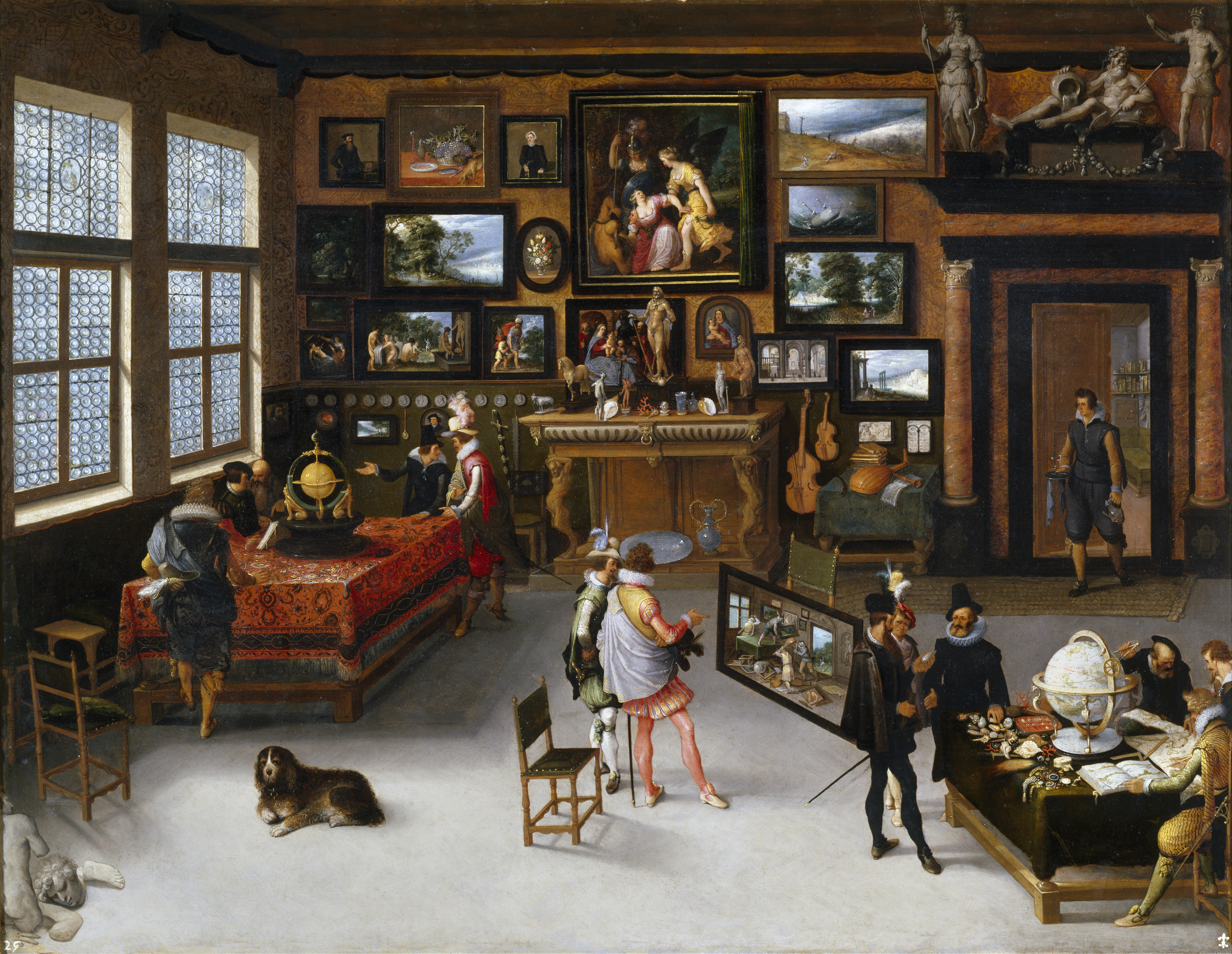
- Artist: Adriaen van Stalbemt or Hieronymus Francken the Younger
- Year: c.1650
- Medium: Oil on canvas
- Dimensions: 117 cm × 89.9 cm (46 in × 35.4 in)
- Location: Museo del Prado, Madrid

The Sciences and the Arts is a 17th-century painting which is part of the collection of the Museo de Prado in Madrid. It has traditionally been attributed to Adriaen van Stalbemt, but more recently some art historians have re-attributed the work to Hieronymus Francken the Younger.

== Description and analysis ==
A scholarly group discusses around several tables, while a second group of people contemplate the paintings on the walls of the room. At the center two characters looking at a chart representing the destruction of works of art by Protestants in the late sixteenth century. A wooden table in the right part of the image shows albums, maritime maps, compasses and a terrestrial globe.

One of the interpretations of the painting is that is serves a propagandistic purpose for the rulers of the Southern Netherlands. The painter's intention is to highlight the protection enjoyed by culture and the arts in the Spanish Netherlands under its Spanish rulers, while this protection is not available in the rebellious Protestant United Provinces in the North.

== A gallery painting ==
The painting falls in the genre of the gallery paintings. Gallery paintings depict large rooms in which many paintings and other precious items are displayed in elegant surroundings. The earliest works in this genre depicted art objects together with other items such as scientific instruments or peculiar natural specimens. Frans Francken the Younger and Jan Brueghel the Elder started the genre by creating paintings of art and curiosity collections in the 1620s. Some gallery paintings include portraits of the owners or collectors of the art objects or artists at work. The genre became immediately quite popular and was followed by other artists such as Jan Brueghel the Younger, Cornelis de Baellieur, Hans Jordaens, David Teniers the Younger, Gillis van Tilborch and Hieronymus Janssens.

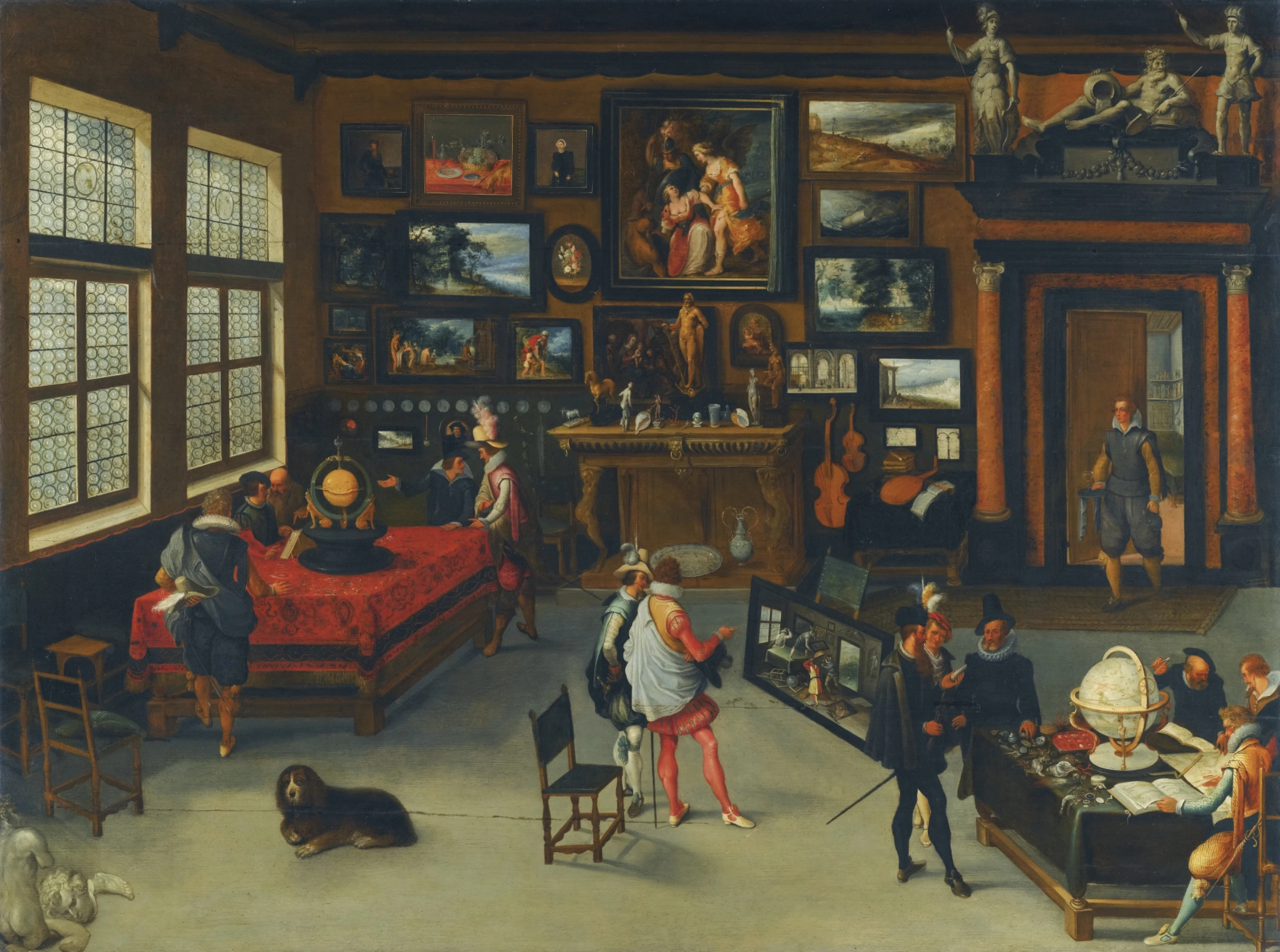
A Collector's Cabinet, attributed to Hieronymus Francken II, at Sotheby's

A number of gallery paintings have traditionally been attributed to van Stalbemt. This includes the composition The Sciences and the Arts discussed here and its reduced replica of the lower right hand corner called The Geographer and the Naturalist (also in the Prado). A Collector's Cabinet, which is similar to the paintings in the Prado, was sold at Sotheby's on 9 July 2014 as lot 57. Most art historians now appear to agree that these works should be attributed to Hieronymus Francken II as van Stalbemt's figures differ from those in these gallery paintings. The staffage in all of the gallery interiors is now seen as most probably the work of as yet unidentified figure painters. Other gallery paintings that were formerly attributed to van Stalbemt have also been re-attributed to Hieronymus Francken II. Even so, some art historians still are of the view that van Stalbemt was also active in this genre. For instance, some art historians still see the hand of van Stalbemt in one of the best known gallery pictures - The Archdukes Albert and Isabella Visiting a Collector's Cabinet (collection of The Walters Art Museum in Baltimore, Maryland).

== Versions ==
There are five known versions of this composition. One in the Prado Museum in Madrid, another in the Galerie Kugel in Paris in 1988; the third was recorded in Hawkins Collection of London in 1951, a fourth version, the Galerie de Jonckheere in Paris in 2002 and the fifth at the Galerie Robert Finck in Brussels on 1955 (which was auctioned at Sotheby's on 9 July 2014 lot 57, as Hieronymus Francken II).
