= 1712 in art =

The following events happened in art in the year 1712.

== Events ==
- August 15 – The new abbey church at Fulda, with its high altar designed by Johann Neudecker and the stuccoist Giovanni Battista Artari, is dedicated by Prince-Abbot Adalbert von Schleifras.
- Charles-André van Loo travels to Rome to study under Benedetto Luti and Pierre Legros.
- Lorenzo Mattielli settles in Vienna.

== Paintings ==
- Rosalba Carriera – Bacchante with a tambourine
- Giuseppe Maria Crespi – The Seven Sacraments series
- Ádám Mányoki – Portrait of Francis II Rákóczi
- Paolo de Matteis – The Choice of Hercules (Ashmolean Museum, Oxford)
- Adriaen van der Werff – The Judgement of Paris

== Births ==
- February 19 – Arthur Devis, English portrait painter, particularly known for his conversation pieces and other such small portraits (died 1787)
- October 5 – Francesco Guardi, Venetian painter of veduta (died 1793)
- October 30 – Christian Wilhelm Ernst Dietrich, German painter (died 1774)
- December 11 – Francesco Algarotti, Italian philosopher and art critic (died 1764)
- date unknown
  - Giuseppe Angeli, Italian painter of the late-baroque active mainly in Venice (died 1798)
  - John Cleveley the Elder, English marine artist (died 1777)
  - Simon Fokke, Dutch designer, etcher, and engraver (died 1784)
  - Nicolas Jean Baptiste Poilly, French draftsman and engraver (died 1780)
  - Toriyama Sekien, scholar and ukiyo-e artist of Japanese folklore (died 1788)
  - Johan Stålbom, Finnish painter who later lived and worked in Sweden (died 1777)
  - Stefano Torelli, Italian painter of altar-pieces and ceiling decorations (died 1784)
- probable
  - Károly Bebo, Hungarian sculptor, builder and decorator noted for his stucco work (died 1777)

== Deaths ==
- May 30 – Andrea Lanzani, Italian painter for the Habsburg court (born 1645)
- August 23 – Jan Kryštof Liška, Czech Baroque painter (born 1650)
- September 9
  - Jan Jiří Heinsch, Czech-German painter of the Baroque style (born 1647)
  - Jean Mauger, French medallist (born 1648)
- September 12 – Jan van der Heyden, Dutch painter (born 1637)
- November 26 – Pietro Dandini, Italian painter of the Baroque period active in Florence (born 1646)
- date unknown
  - Louis Audran, French engraver (born 1670)
  - Andrea Celesti, Venetian painter (born 1637)
  - Giovanni Evangelista Draghi, Italian painter of the Baroque period (born 1657)
  - Buhurizade Mustafa Itri, Ottoman-Turkish musician, composer, calligrapher, singer and poet (born 1640)
  - Francesco Monti (il Brescianino), Italian painter of battle scenes (born 1646)
  - Lars Myra, Finnish painter (born unknown)
  - Michelangelo Palloni, Italian painter (born 1637)
