= Adriaen van Stalbemt =

Flemish Baroque painter (1580–1662)

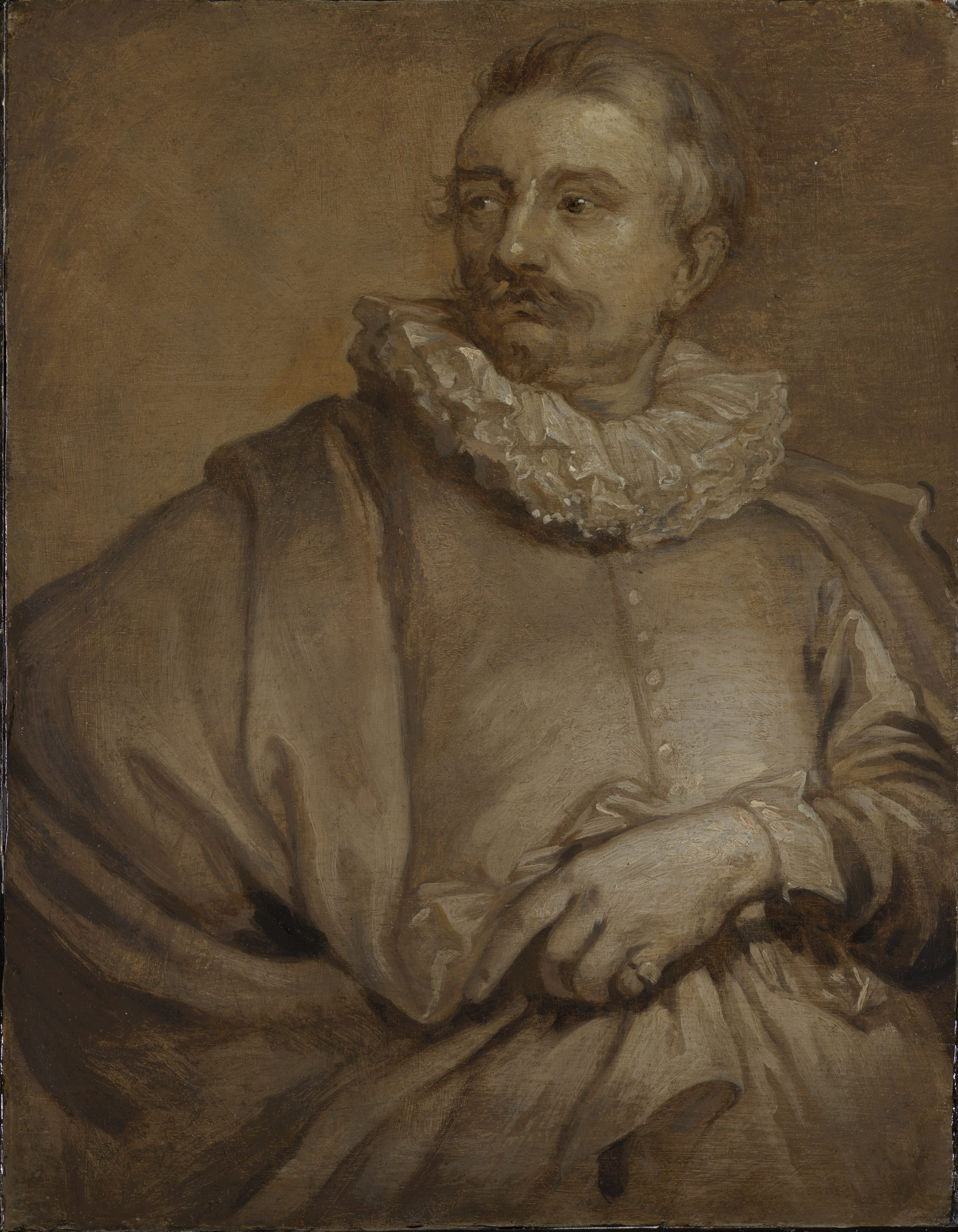
Adriaen van Stalbemt by Anthony van Dyck

Adriaen or Adriaan van Stalbemt or Adriaen van Stalbempt (12 June 1580 – 21 September 1662) was a Flemish painter and printmaker who is known for his landscapes with religious, mythological and allegorical scenes. He was also a gifted figure painter who was regularly invited to paint the staffage in compositions of fellow painters.

== Life ==
The Flemish biographer Cornelis de Bie stated in his book of artist biographies Het Gulden Cabinet, published in 1661, that Adriaen van Stalbemt was born on 12 June 1580. No baptismal records from Antwerp's churches for the artist exist as his family was Protestant. After the fall of Antwerp in 1585, his family moved for religious reasons to Middelburg where he probably received his artistic training.

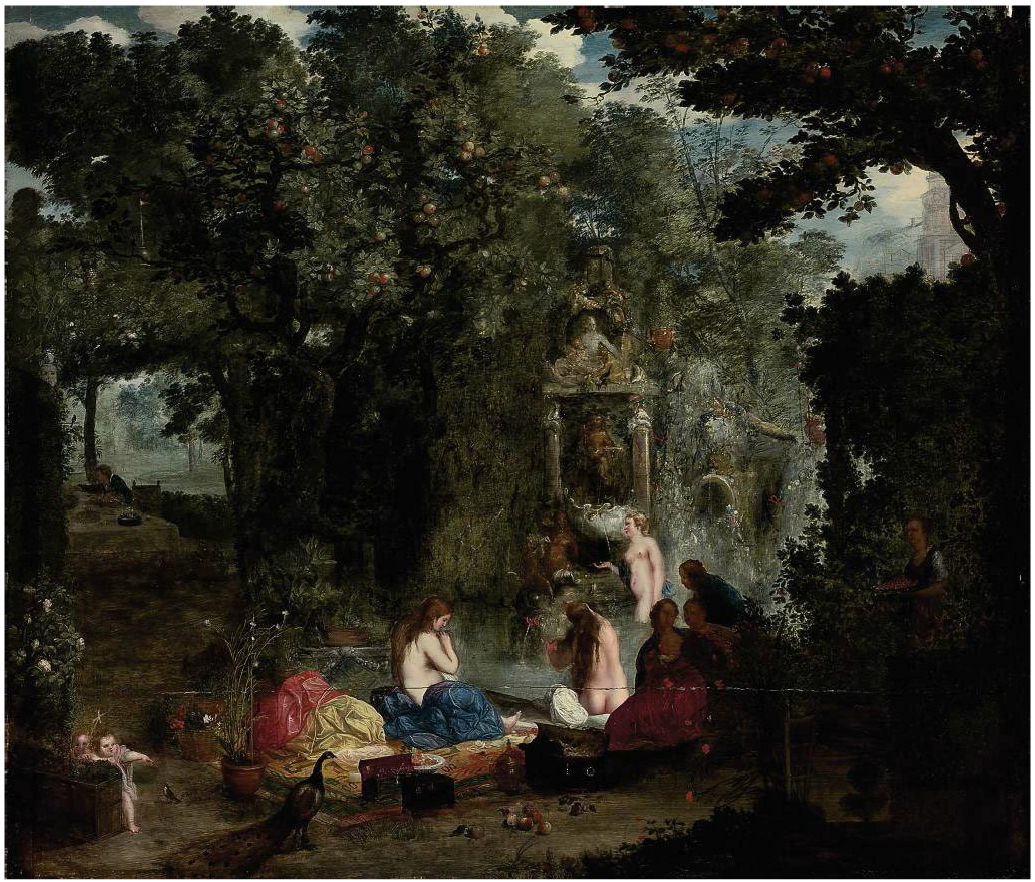
Classical landscape with nymphs bathing in a grotto

He returned to Antwerp after 1609, probably after the entry into effect of the Twelve Years' Truce, which heralded a cessation of hostilities between the Habsburg rulers of the Habsburg Netherlands and the Dutch Republic. He was admitted in 1610 as a master of the Antwerp Guild of St Luke. In 1616 Hans Mesmaeckers was registered as his pupil. In 1617 he was elected dean of the Guild. In this role he was able to obtain the reinstatement of certain privileges of the chamber of rhetoric the Violieren, which was linked to the Guild. He established himself as a painter of landscapes but was also a capable staffage and animal painter. He worked on commissions for the art dealer Peter Goetkint II for whom he made cabinet paintings, i.e. small paintings on copper that were integrated into cabinets. He also produced paintings for the Antwerp art dealer Chrysostomos van Immerseel.

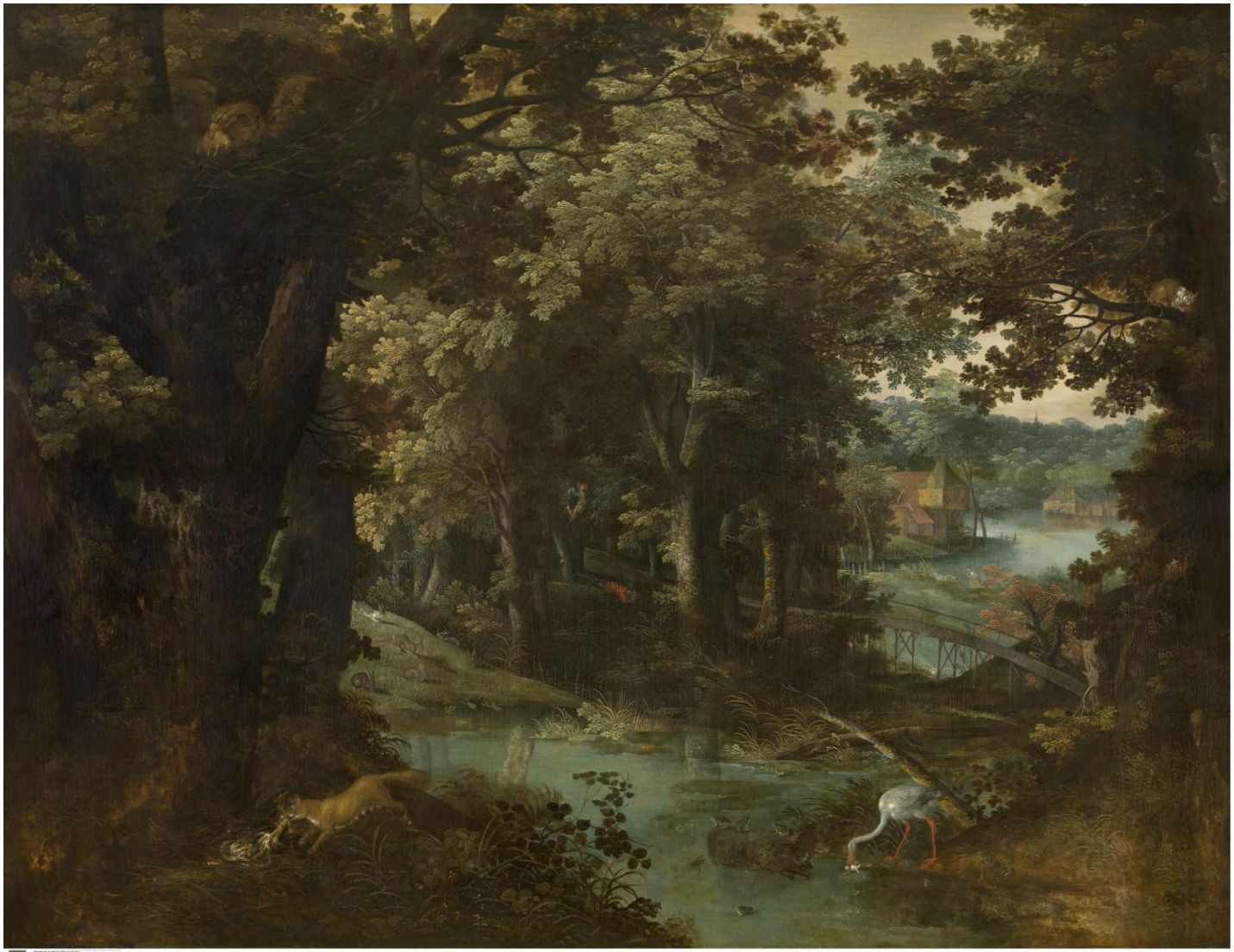
Landscape with fables

On 5 May 1613, van Stalbemt married Barbara Verdelft, daughter of the art dealer Jan Verdelft. A daughter born to the couple died young and the couple remained childless. After his wedding the artist's career started to take off and the family was able to acquire a home in the fashionable city centre on the Meir.

In 1633 the artist was active in London for about ten months. Cornelis de Bie reported that King Charles I of England had invited the artist to England. During his stay he painted two landscape views of Greenwich with King Charles I and Queen Henrietta Maria (still in the Royal Collection).

The artist had converted back to Catholicism upon his wedding but had returned to the Protestant faith shortly before his death. He died on 21 September 1662 and was buried in an unconsecrated burial site in Putte.

== Work ==
=== General ===
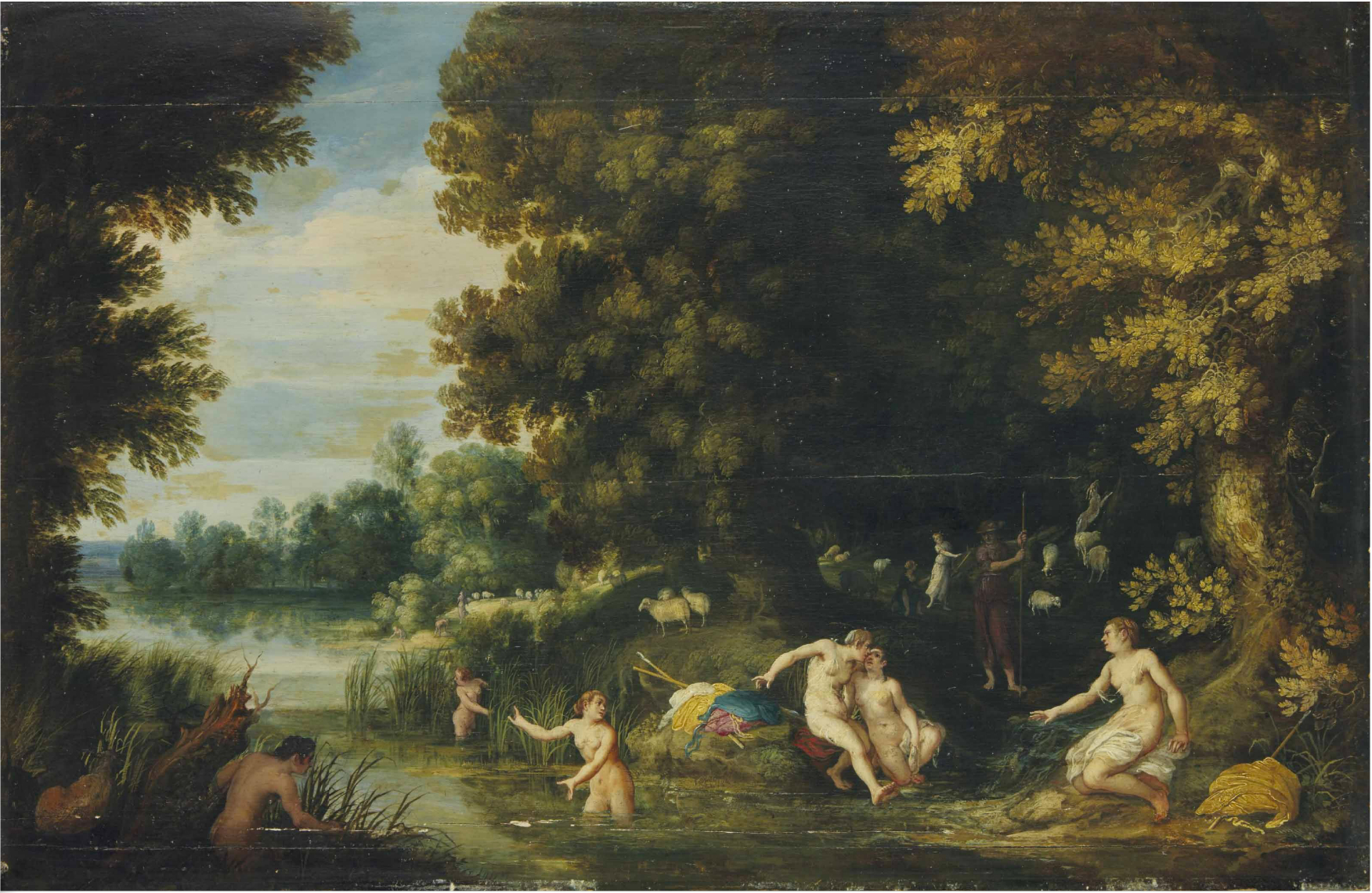
Diana and Callisto, Actaeon in the distance

Van Stalbemt was a versatile artist who was active as a painter as well as a printmaker. He was mainly known for his landscapes which typically included religious, mythological and allegorical scenes. Only a small number of his works is dated which makes it difficult to establish a chronology. One of the reference works for attributions is the Feast of the Gods in the Gemäldegalerie Alte Meister in Dresden, which is signed and dated 1622.

His style has been described as eclectic, as it shows the influences of various artists such as Jan Brueghel the Elder, Jan Brueghel the Younger, Hendrick van Balen, Paul Bril and Adam Elsheimer. His landscapes are also influenced by Gillis van Coninxloo.

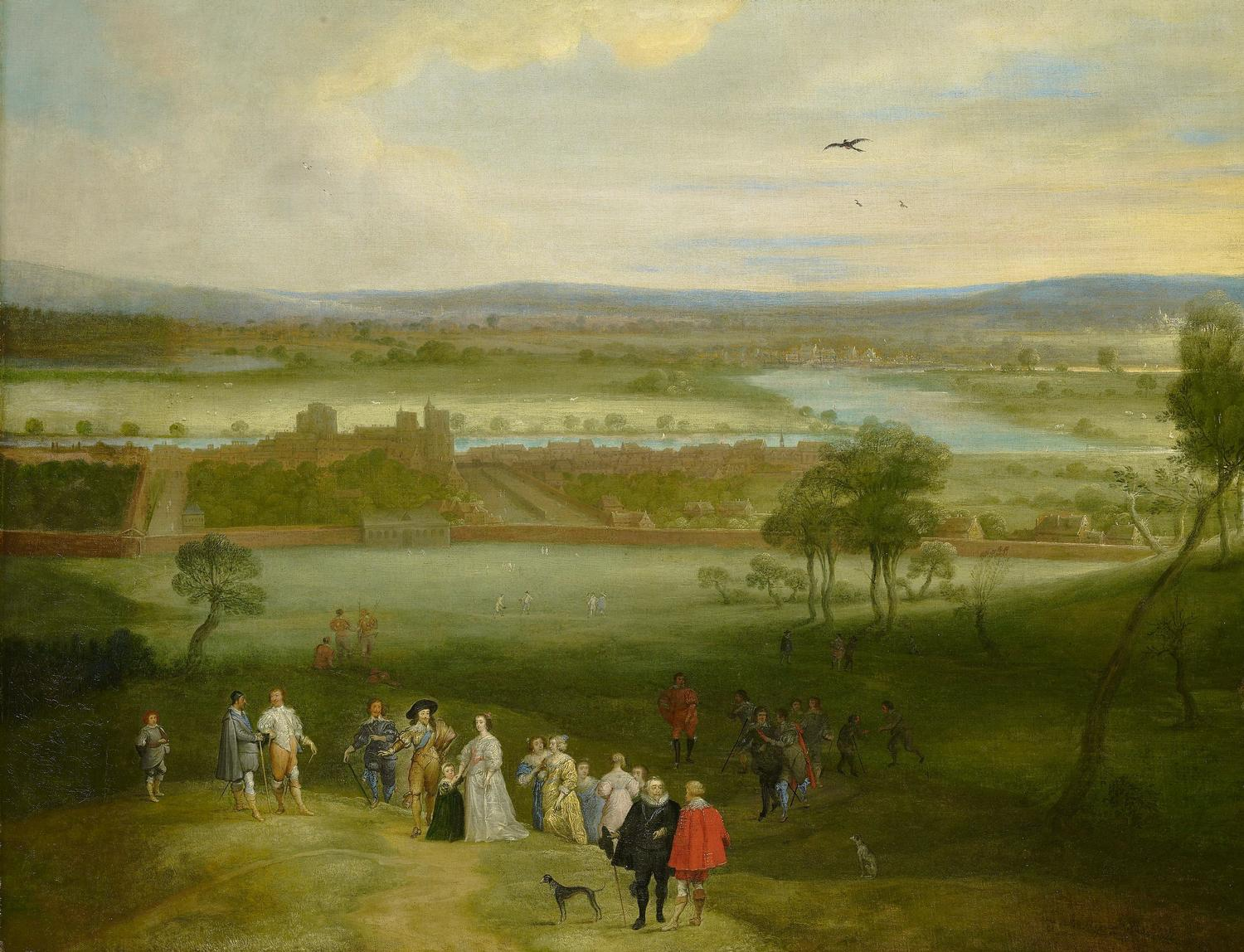
A View of Greenwich

A work showing Jan Brueghel the Elder's influence is the Landscape with Fables (Royal Museum of Fine Arts Antwerp). This is reflected in van Stalbemt's meticulous brush technique and the miniature treatment of details. Alongside Abraham Govaerts, van Stalbemt is considered one of the best followers and imitators of Jan Brueghel the Elder. Various characteristics help distinguish his works from those of Breughel: to render foliage and the colour of the houses he used light yellow rather than pink as Jan Brueghel the Elder did.

Other works are duller in colour and do not display the same meticulous brush technique. The composition David slaying Goliath (1618, Museo del Prado, Madrid) is a collaborative work with Pieter Brueghel the Younger, in which the figures were the work of van Stalbemt. One group of works previously attributed to Adam Elsheimer has been reattributed to van Stalbemt. The influence of Elsheimer, which is particularly apparent in the composition, is believed to have been passed on via David Teniers the Elder, who had worked for a period in Elsheimer's studio. Van Stalbemt's later work shows similarities with Hendrick van Balen's work.

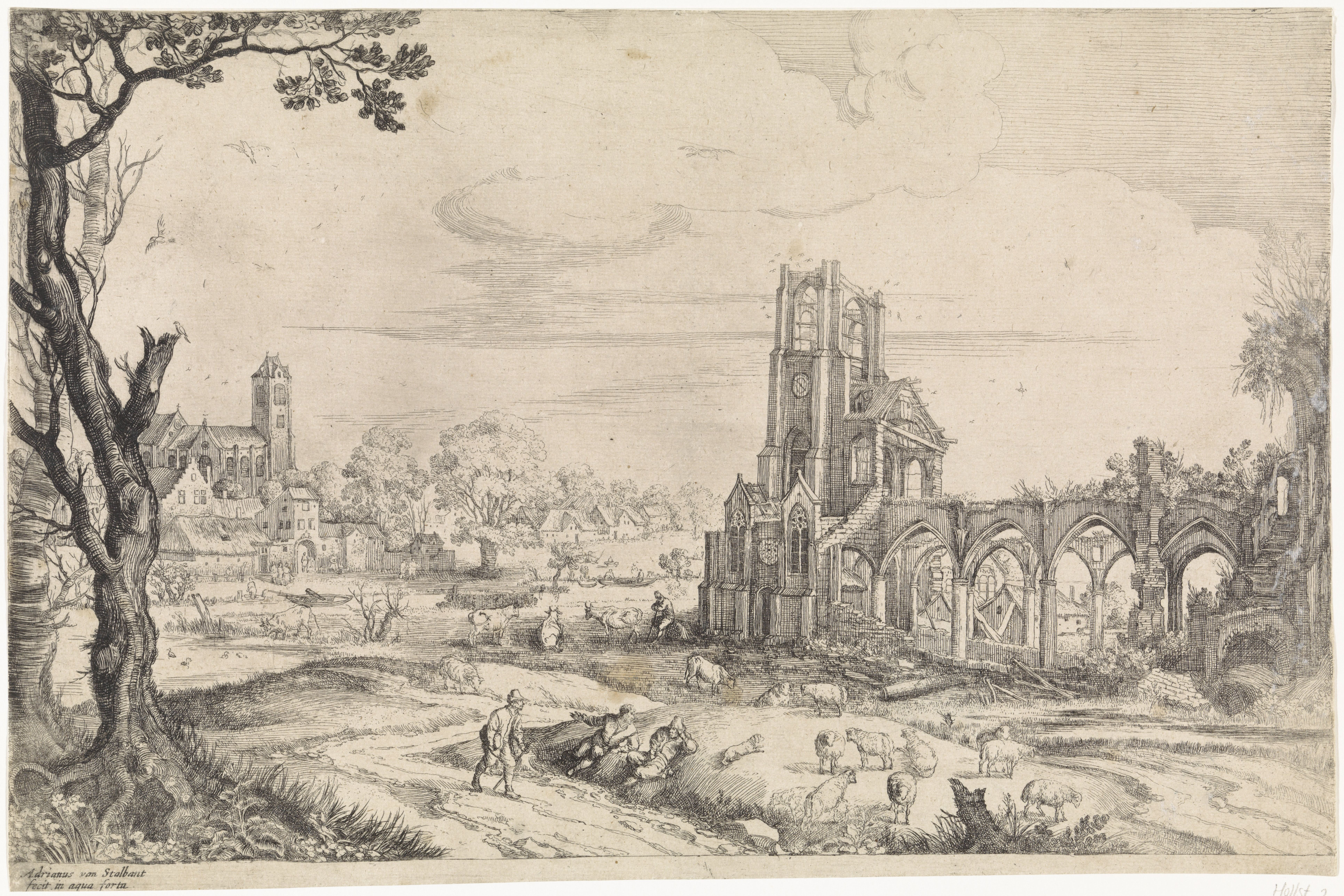
Landscape with the ruin of an abbey

Van Stalbemt was also active as a printmaker. A series of landscape prints by his hand represent respectively a coastal marine view with ships, a watermill, a windmill, ruins and a castle on a mountain.

=== Gallery paintings ===
Gallery paintings depict large rooms in which many paintings and other precious items are displayed in elegant surroundings. The earliest works in this genre depicted art objects together with other items such as scientific instruments or peculiar natural specimens. Frans Francken the Younger and Jan Brueghel the Elder started the genre by creating paintings of art and curiosity collections in the 1620s. Some gallery paintings include portraits of the owners or collectors of the art objects or artists at work. The genre became immediately quite popular and was followed by other artists such as Jan Brueghel the Younger, Cornelis de Baellieur, Hans Jordaens, David Teniers the Younger, Gillis van Tilborch and Hieronymus Janssens.

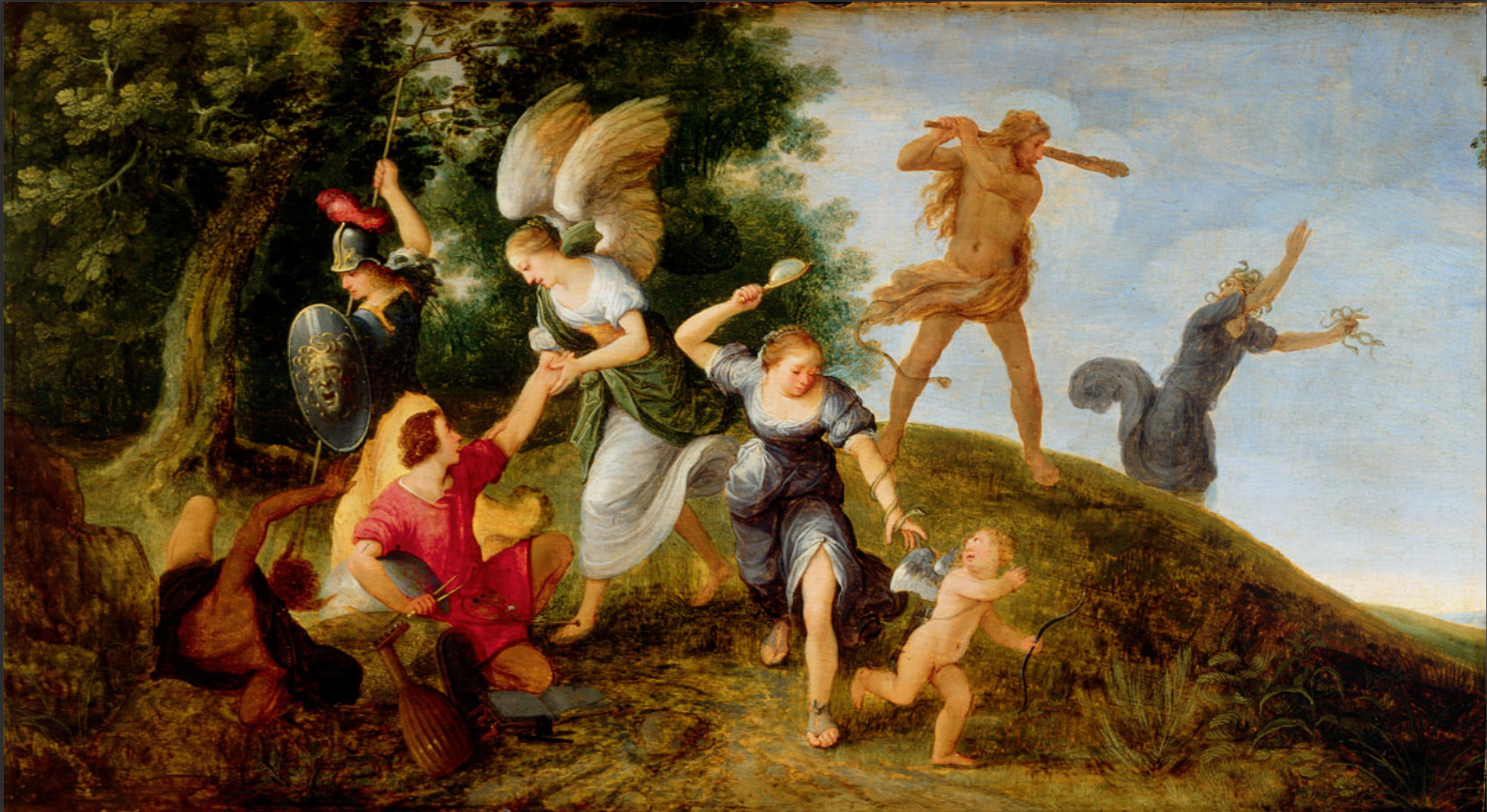
Protectors of the young artist

A number of gallery paintings have traditionally been attributed to van Stalbemt. This includes the composition The Sciences and the Arts and the reduced replica of the lower right hand corner of that composition called The Geographer and the Naturalist (both in the Prado). A Collector's Cabinet, which is similar to the paintings in the Prado, was sold at Sotheby's on 9 July 2014 as lot 57. Most art historians now appear to agree that these works should be attributed to Hieronymus Francken II as van Stalbemt's figures differ from those in these gallery paintings. It is now believed that the staffage in all of the gallery interiors was most likely the work of as yet unidentified figure painters. Other gallery paintings that formerly were attributed to van Stalbemt have been re-attributed to Hieronymus Francken II. Even so, some art historians still are of the view that van Stalbemt was also active in this genre. For instance, some art historians still see the hand of van Stalbemt in one of the best known gallery pictures – The Archdukes Albert and Isabella Visiting a Collector's Cabinet (collection of The Walters Art Museum in Baltimore, Maryland).
