= François de Poilly =

French engraver (1623–1693)

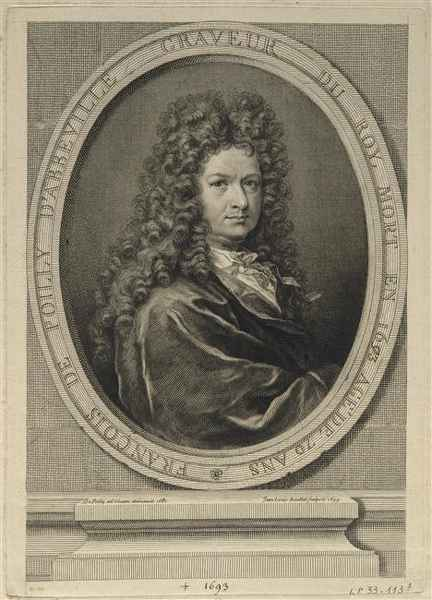
- François Poilly. Portrait par Jean-Louis Roullet
- Born: 1623; Abbeville, France
- Died: 1693; Paris, France
- Education: apprenticeship with parisian engraver Pierre Daret, Flemish engraver Cornelis Bloemaert
- Known for: Engraving

François Poilly, or François de Poilly, (1623 –1693) was a French engraver.

== Biography ==
He was born in Abbeville, the son of a goldsmith who gave him his first drawing lessons. He was apprenticed to the Parisian engraver Pierre Daret. Poilly then travelled to Rome where he stayed for seven years with the engraver Cornelis Bloemaert, where he acquired mastership of the art. He died in Paris.

Il réussit parfaitement dans cette manière, où la sorte de froideur qui en est inséparable, est entièrement gazée par la douceur, le moelleux et la beauté du faire; par le rare talent qu'avait Poilly de conserver les grâces, la noblesse et la précision des tableaux qu'il gravait; avantage résultant de ce qu'il était excellent dessinateur

— F. E. Joubert, Manuel de l'amateur d'estampes, Paris, 1821, vol. II, pp. 365–366.

== Works ==
Poilly's is noted for approximately 400 engravings. He is known for mainly religious subjects after Raphael, Guido Reni, Annibale Carracci, Pierre Mignard, Charles Le Brun, Nicolas Poussin, Sébastien Bourdon, and Eustache Lesueur.

He made the engraved illustrations of the ceremonial clothes of the orders mentioned in "Maximilien Bullot & Pierre Hélyot's Histoire des ordres ...", Ed. Nicolas Gosselin, Paris, 1719 (Google Books). See François de Poilly – History of Orders in Wikimedia commons

== Legacy ==
His apprentice Jean-Louis Roullet has left of him a remarkable portrait, about which Pierre-Jean Mariette wrote:

Roullet avait commencé de [le] graver par motif de reconnaissance, et il en voulait faire un présent aux enfants de Poilly, son ancien maître; mais il mourut sur cet ouvrage et le laissa imparfait. Pierre Drevet se chargea de le rachever et le voulut aussi faire gratuitement; l'on reconnaît aisément son travail dans la perruque et dans plusieurs parties de la tête. C'est M. Poilly, le fils de François, qui m'a appris cette particularité

— Pierre-Jean Mariette, Abecedario de P.-J. Mariette, et autres notes inédites de cet amateur sur les arts et les artistes, ouvrage publié par MM. Ph. de Chennevières et A. de Montaiglon, Dumoulin, Paris, vol. IV, 1857–1858, p. 188. Modernized Orthograph.

François' younger brother, Nicolas de Poilly (1626–1698), was an engraver too, as well as the latter's two sons, Jean-Baptiste de Poilly (1669–1728) and Nicolas de Poilly the Younger (1675–1723).

== See also ==
- Pierre Daret
- Cornelis Bloemaert
- Boucher-de-Perthes Museum in Abbeville
