= Nicolas de Poilly the Younger =

French painter (1675-1747)

- Born: 28 June 1675; Paris, France
- Died: 12 August 1747 (aged 72); Paris, France
- Education: pupil of Pierre Mignard and Jean Jouvenet
- Father: Nicolas de Poilly the Elder
- Relatives: The Poilly family of engravers
- Awards: Prix de Rome, 1698

Nicolas de Poilly (June 28, 1675 – August 12, 1747), also called Nicolas de Poilly the Younger, Nicolas de Poilly jeune, or Nicolas II de Poilly (to distinguish him from his father, Nicolas de Poilly the Elder), was an academically trained French artist who won the Prix de Rome for painting in 1698. Despite an impressive start, he largely abandoned painting for drawing and became an engraver like his father, his uncle François de Poilly, and several others in the Poilly family.

== Education and early success ==
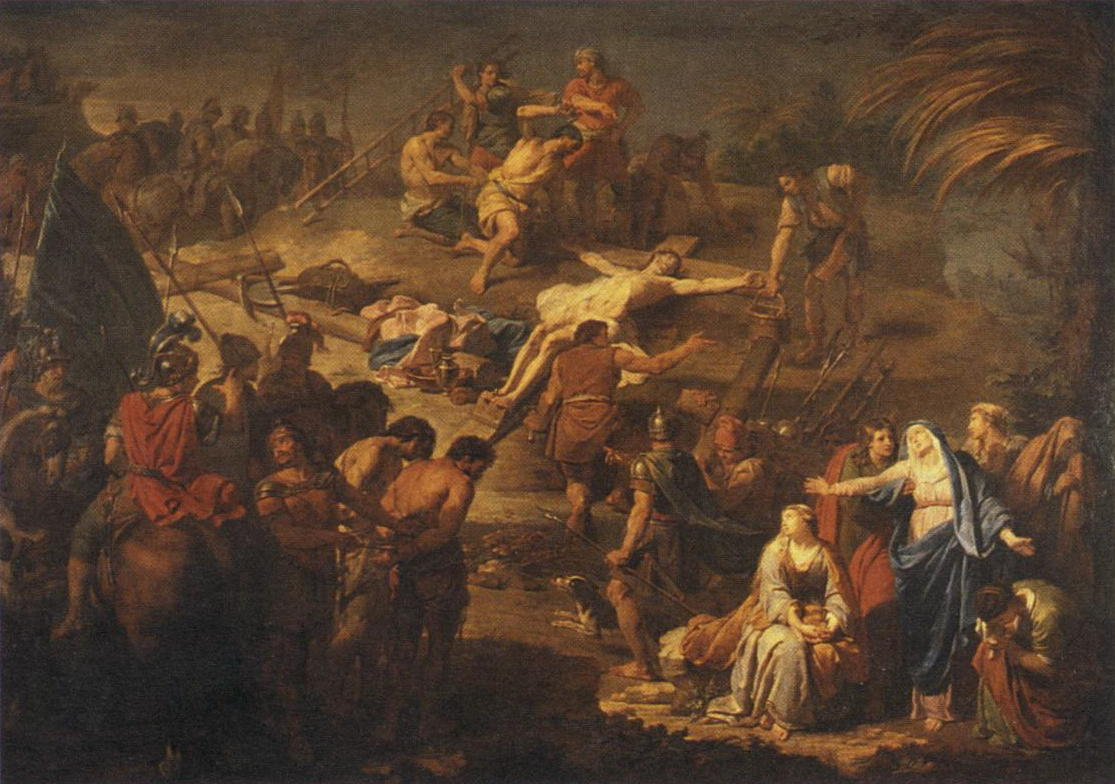
Le Christ cloué sur la Croix (1697), Musée Boucher-de-Perthes.

Originally from Abbeville, Nicolas' father and uncle settled in Paris in the middle of the 17th century and became successful engravers. Nicolas learned engraving from his father, then studied painting at the Académie royale de peinture et de sculpture, becoming the pupil first of Pierre Mignard and then of Jean Jouvenet, two leading artists of the court of Louis XIV. He won minor prizes (petits prix) at the quarterly drawing competitions in 1693 and 1696, then won first prizes in 1697 and 1698. "No one at the academy drew as well as he," wrote Pierre-Jean Mariette.

In 1697, Poilly gained recognition as a painter with Le Christ cloué sur la Croix, a work "that astonished all who saw it." Florent Le Comte wrote that the young Poilly (then 21 or 22) displayed "a sense for color so precise and so deeply understood that one would believe the work must come from one of our famous Moderns if one had not seen him paint it."

In August, 1698, he won the Prix de Rome, for which all contestants painted the same Old Testament subject, The Finding of Joseph's Cup in Benjamin's Sack. The prize was especially coveted because the winner traditionally received a scholarship to live and study in Rome for a number of years at the expense of the King of France.

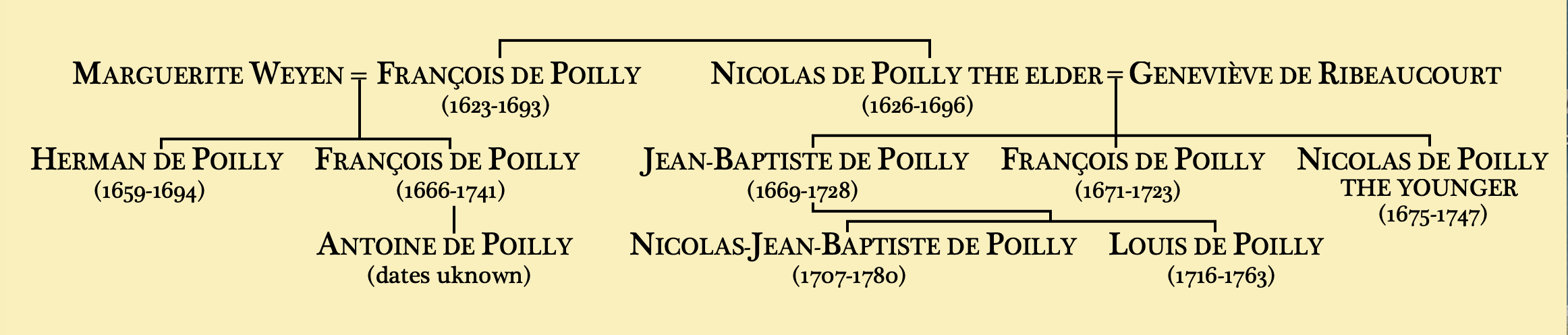

== Denial of scholarship, later career ==
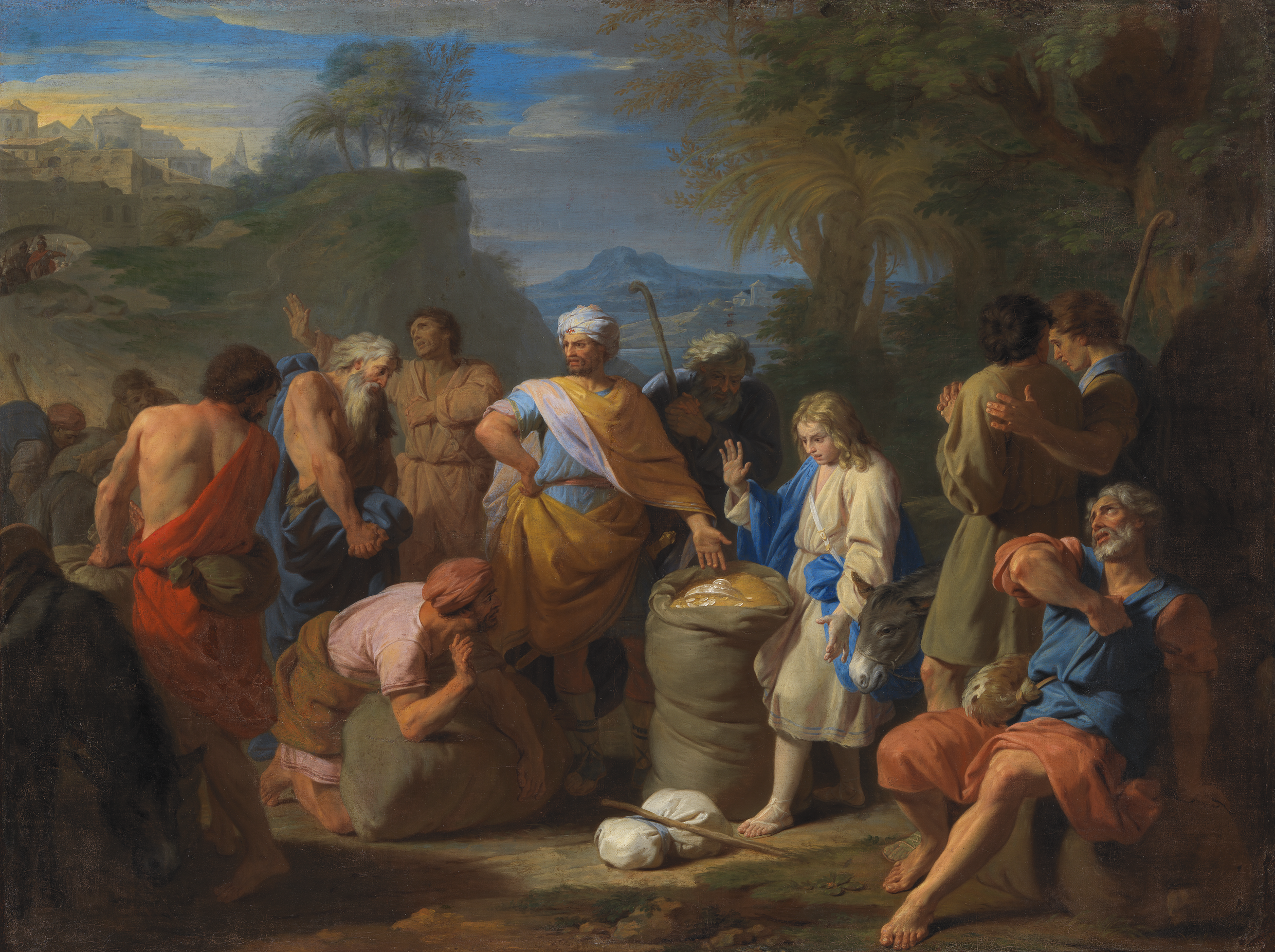
The Finding of Joseph's Cup in Benjamin's Sack (1698), National Gallery of Ireland.

In a letter dated April 3, 1699, seeking to secure travel funds for Poilly's Prix de Rome scholarship, Noël Coypel, who had been director of the academy in both Rome and then Paris, wrote that Poilly's was "the best work to compete for the Prix in a long time." But within days of Coypel's letter the architect Jules Hardouin-Mansart was named superintendent of the Bâtiments du roi, giving him control of the Prix de Rome funds. Hardouin-Mansart ignored Poilly's right to a scholarship and instead channeled funds to his own favorites and (in a cost-cutting move) to painters already in Rome who did not require travel expenses.

Poilly decided to travel to Rome at his own expense in November, 1699, but the double-dealing of the academy and his sudden reversal of fortune may have soured Poilly on a painting career. Mariette writes that "a dark and taciturn mood seized him; he became misanthropic; he divorced himself from society. He missed the opportunities to paint, and found himself only good at making drawings."

This skill served him well when Pierre Crozat undertook to have engravings made of the best paintings in France; Poilly (without credit) executed the drawings and oversaw the work of the engravers. The result was Recueil d'estampes d'après les plus beaux tableaux et d'après les plus beaux desseins qui sont en France, also known as Recueil Crozat. A volume of 140 plates was published in 1729, and a second volume of 42 prints in 1740. After Crozat's death, the plates were sold to a company of booksellers who commissioned Pierre-Jean Mariette to reorganize the Recueil; Mariette divided the plates into two volumes, added some missing descriptions, and advertised the set to the public in 1742.

Poilly may not have given up painting entirely. A painting at Versailles dated 1723, Le Parnasse français, is attributed to Poilly. It depicts a statue designed by Louis Garnier that was never built. Poilly is known to have made the drawing, and presumably the painting as well.

At the time of his death in 1747, Poilly was unmarried and without children. Drawing on archival records, Marandet calculates his net worth at "almost 89,000 livres, a large estate for an artist whose career was cut off so early on."

== Extant works ==
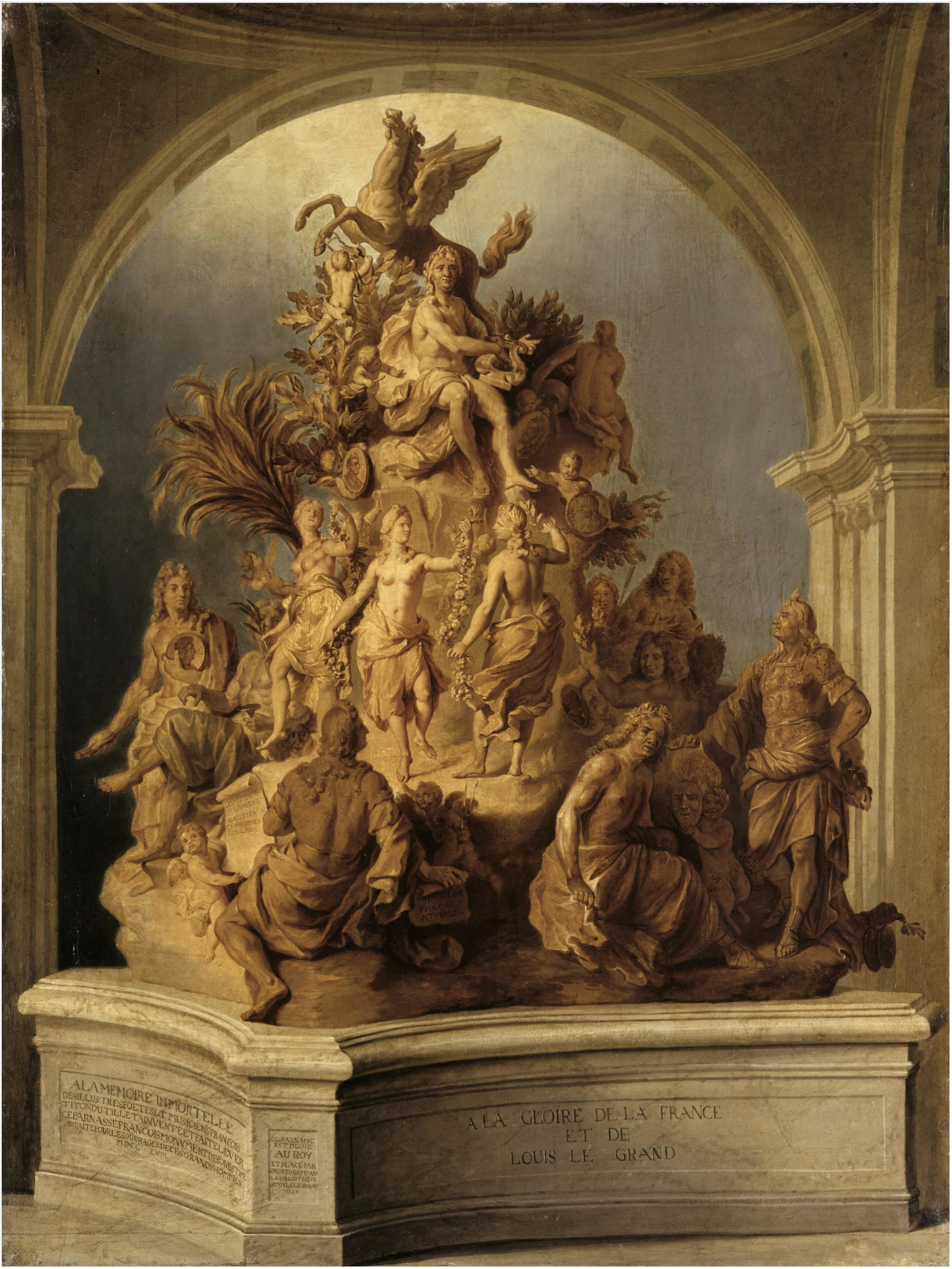
Le Parnasse français (1723), attributed to Poilly, Château de Versailles.

The number of known works by Poilly is small. Paintings considered lost include Notre Seigneur servi par les anges ("a piece well composed and elegantly drawn"), l'Adoration des bergers, and Diane au retour de la chasse. Benezit lists St. Charles Borromeo Visiting the Plague Victims of Milan.

Its location long unknown, Le Christ cloué sur la Croix (which Mariette said "astonished all who saw it"), reappeared in 1969 when it entered the collection of the Musée Boucher-de-Perthes in Abbeville, the hometown of the Poilly family. It is his only signed and dated work. The museum also owns Poilly's portrait paintings Saint Jean l'Évangéliste and Saint Pierre.

A study for a painting of the Crucifixion, Le Christ mis en croix, is at the Château de Compiègne in France.

The Finding of Joseph's Cup in Benjamin's Sack, the painting for which Poilly's won the Prix de Rome, is in the collection of the National Gallery of Ireland, which also owns a copy of the painting by Nicolas Bertin.

Le Parnasse français (1723) at Versailles is attributed to Poilly.

Benezit lists Christ Seated, with Open Arms and Raised Head (black chalk heightened with white) at the Musée Antoine-Lécuyer in Saint-Quentin.

At least two of his academies (nude studies from life) are preserved, a drawing of a male nude at the Bibliothèque Municipale, Rouen, and a drawing of a bearded figure kneeling over a fallen warrior (perhaps Menelaus and Patroclus) which is known from two different engravings, one by Nicolas' brother, Jean-Baptiste, and the other by Johann Conrad Reiff. Le Comte wrote of Jean-Baptiste, "to convey the strength of his brother's paintings, no other engraver will do."

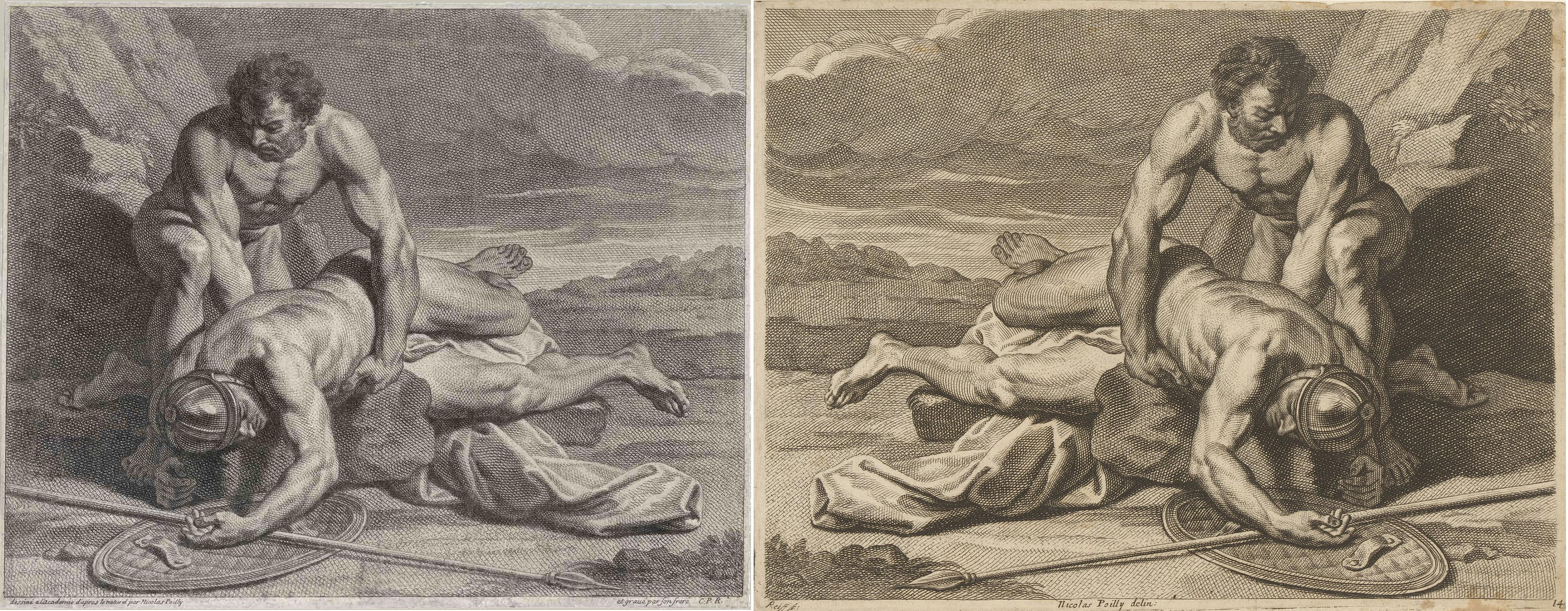
After an untitled academie by Nicolas de Poilly the Younger, two different engravingsː left, by his brother Jean-Baptiste de Poilly, and right, by Johann Conrad Reiff.

== Exhibition ==
From July 30 to November 13, 2011, the Musée Boucher-de-Perthes in Abbeville presented an exhibition of 86 works, De Poilly, famille d'artistes. The family originated in Abbevile and the museum has many of their works, spanning three generations. The exhibit featured works by Nicolas de Poilly the Younger in pastel, pencil, engraving, and oil on canvas, including Saint Jean l'évangéliste and Saint Pierre, both restored in 2010–2011.

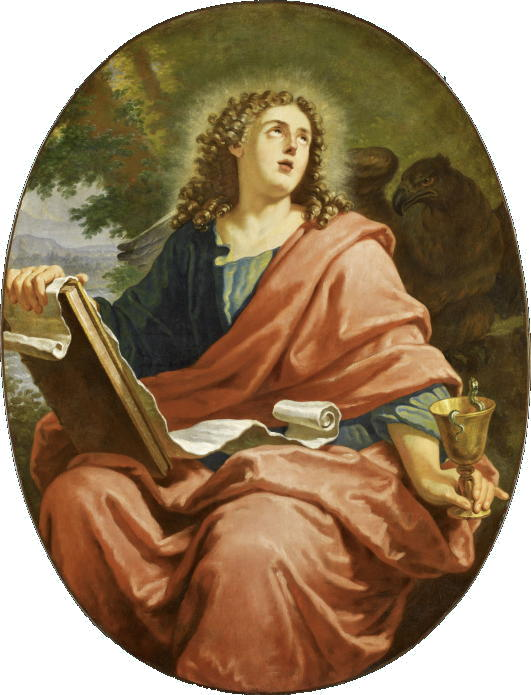
Saint Jean l'évangéliste, Musée Boucher-de-Perthes

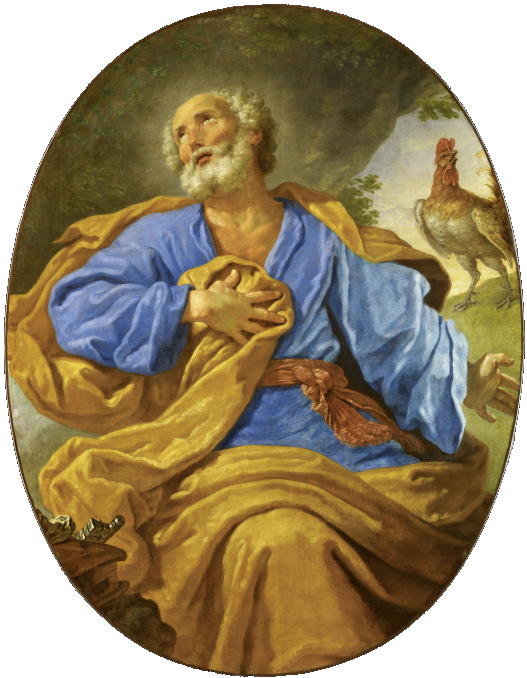
Saint Pierre, Musée Boucher-de-Perthes

== Sources ==
- Coypel, Antoine. Lettre du Peintre Antoine Coypel (1699), Archives de l'art français, De Nobele, 1873, volume 14, pp. 346–348.
- Dezallier d'Argenville, Antoine-Nicolas. Voyage pittoresque de Paris, Paris: Chez de Bure, 1749.
- Guiffrey, Jules. Liste des pensionnaires de l'Académie de France à Rome, donnant les noms de tous les artistes récompensés dans les concours du Prix de Rome de 1663 à 1907, Paris: 1908.
- Le Comte, Florent, Lambert Marchant, and Jacobus Harrewijn. Cabinet Des Singularitez D'architecture, Peinture, Sculpture, Et Graveure, Ou, Introduction a La Connoissance Des Plus Beaux Arts, Figurés Sous Les Tableaux, Les Statues & Les Estampes, second edition, volume 3, Brusselles: Chez Lambert Marchant, 1702, pp. 398–399.
- Lothe, José (1994). L'oeuvre gravée de François et Nicolas de Poilly d'Abbeville, Paris 1994.
- Lothe, José (2000). “Histoire de la gravure” in École pratique des hautes études. Section des sciences historiques et philologiques. Livret-Annuaire 14 [reports from 1998 to 1999 conferences], 2000, pp. 159–161.
- Marandet, François. “The Grand Prix of Nicolas De Poilly the Younger”, The Burlington Magazine, August, 2005, Vol. 147, No. 1229, pp. 549–551.
- Mariette, Pierre-Jean. Abecedario de P. J. Mariette et autres notes inédites de cet amateur sur les arts et les artists: Ouvrage publié d'après les manuscrits autographes conservés au cabinet des estampes de la Bibliothèque impériale, et annoté par mm. Ph. de Chennevières et A. de Montaiglon, Paris: J. B. Dumoulin, 1851/53-1859/60, pp. 193–194.
- Schnapper, A., "Abbeville Musée: Apropos d'un tableau de N. de Poilly, 'peintre maudit'", La Revue du Louvre et des Musées de France 22 (1972), pp. 325–328.
