= Interior of an Art Gallery =

1637 painting by Cornelis de Baellieur

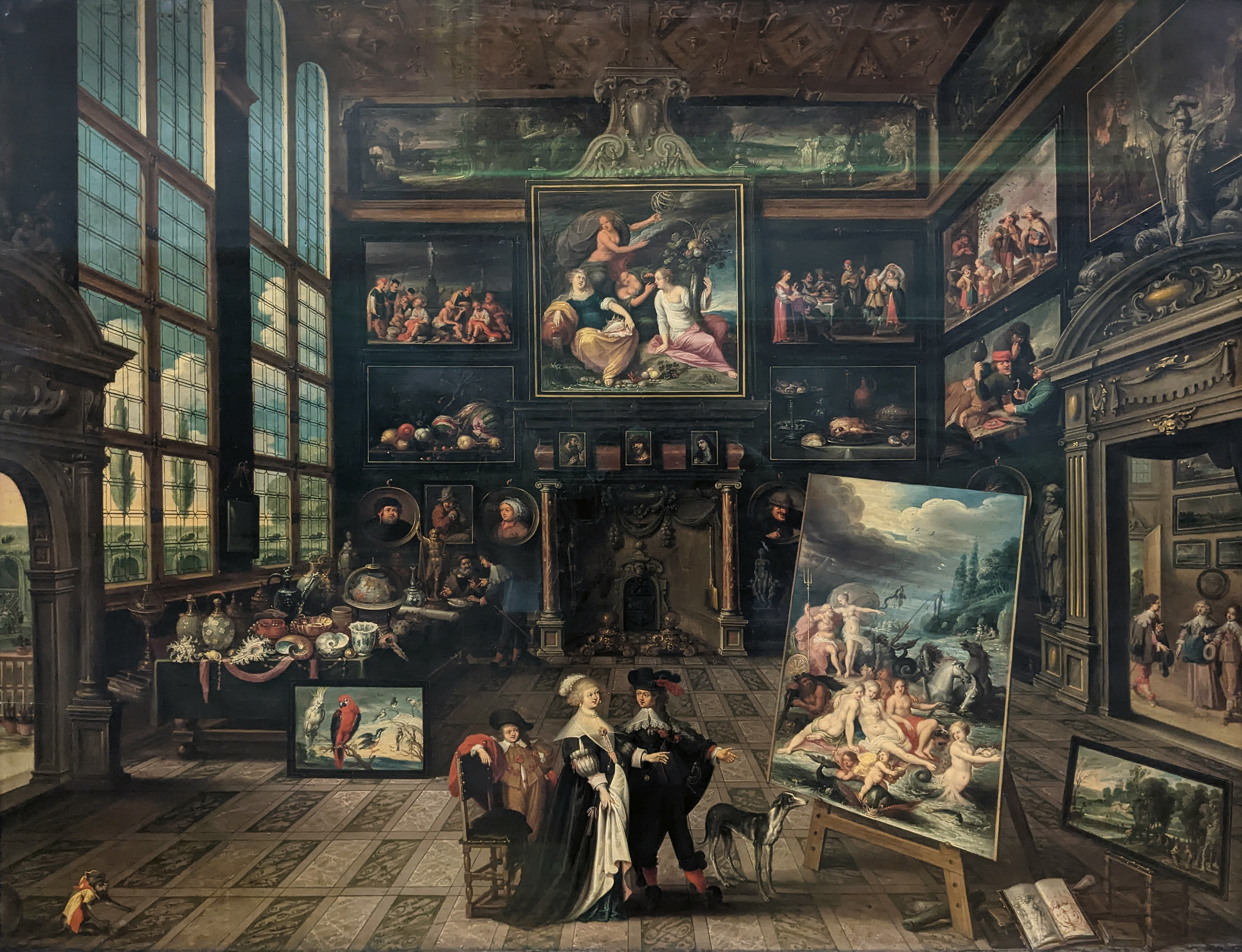

Interior of an Art Gallery is a 1637 oil on canvas painting by Cornelis de Baellieur, with the architecture and the paintings on the walls added by Hans Jordaens III. Alexandre Cart left it to the Louvre Museum in 1864 and it still hangs there as MI 699. It was exhibited at the Rubens' Europe exhibition at Louvre-Lens from 22 May to 23 September 2013.
