= Hans III Jordaens =

Flemish painter

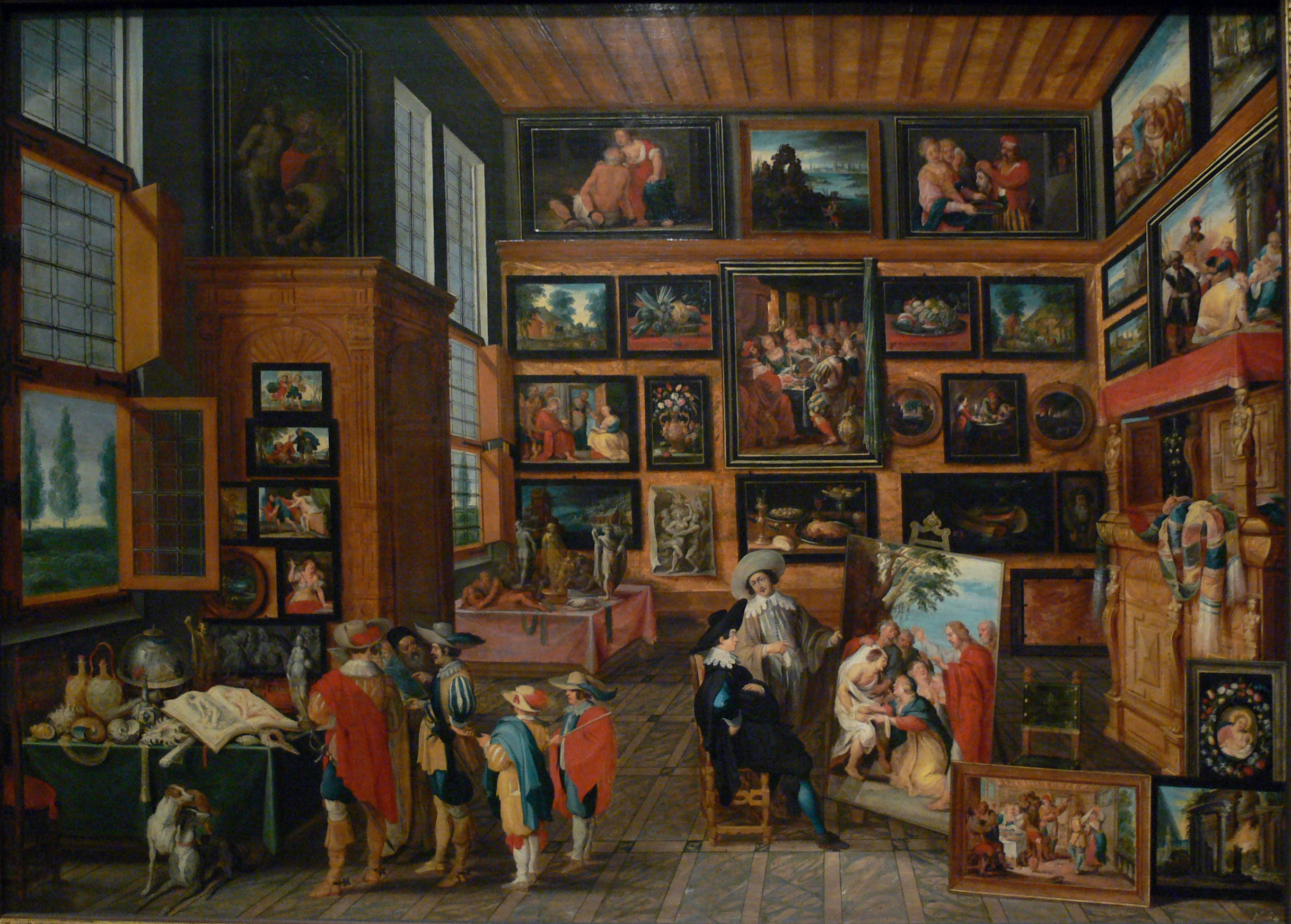
Interior of an Art Gallery, with the gallery by Jordaens and figures by Cornelis de Baellieur, ca. 1630.

Hans III Jordaens (1590–1643) was a Flemish Baroque painter.

== Biography ==
According to the RKD his birth year and place is uncertain. He could have been born in Delft as a son of Hans Jordaens, or he may have been born in Antwerp as a relative of Jacob Jordaens. He painted historical allegories, interiors, animals, and art galleries. He also painted staffage for Abraham Govaerts. His works are often confused with works of other painters by the same name.

According to Houbraken, the widow of the lawyer Nicolaas Muys van Holy (1653/54-1717) owned a painting by him of the Pharaoh's army crossing the red sea and drowning with horses and wagons. Houbraken confused him with the painter Hans IV Jordaens of Delft.
