= Pierre Daret =

French portrait painter and engraver (1604–1678)

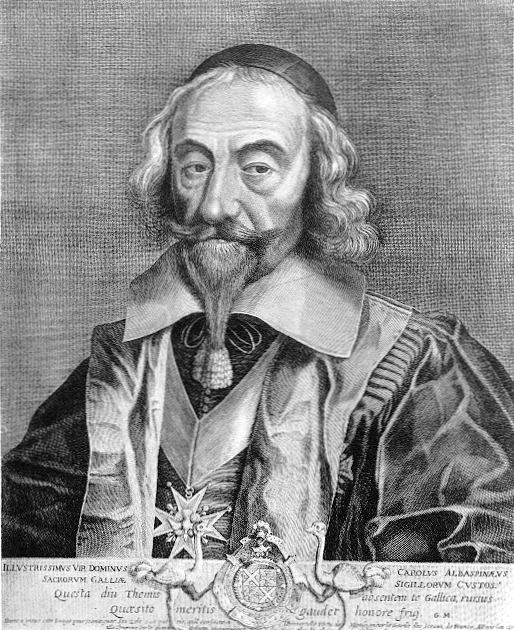
Charles de l'Aubespine, marquis de Châteauneuf

Pierre Daret de Cazeneuve (1604 – March 29, 1678) was a French portrait painter and engraver born in Paris. After receiving some instruction in engraving, he went to Rome to improve his skill, and spent a considerable time there. He was received into the Academy of Painting in 1663.

He died at the château of La Luque, near Dax (Landes) in 1678. Mariette says that this artist began and finished his career with painting. He engraved upwards of four hundred plates, not without merit, but very deficient in taste and correctness of drawing.

== Biography ==
He first trained in drawing and painting, possibly under Claude Vignon. Pierre-Jean Mariette wrote that he began and ended his career as a painter. He probably learned engraving from Jacques Blanchard.

In 1631, he requested an inventory of the possessions of Vespasian Daret, master ebony carpenter.

On August 23, 1632, he signed Pierre Palliot apprenticeship contract, which he took on for two years.

His oldest known engraving depicts Charlotte des Ursins, Viscountess of Auchy, offering the Virgin Mary her homilies on Saint Paul's Epistle to the Hebrews, created in 1634.

On July 1, 1640, he witnessed and signed the marriage contract of Simon Vouet and Radegonde Béranger, widow of Léonard Margerie, as well as Aubin Vouet, brother of Simon Vouet, painter, Jacques Sarrazin, sculptor and his nephew through his wife, Michel Dorigny, painter, Eustache Le Sueur, painter.

Daret is primarily known as an engraver. He was admitted to the Royal Académie royale de peinture et de sculpture on September 15, 1663, after submitting a portrait painting.

He drew some of his own designs and interpreted painters of his time such as Jacques Blanchard and Simon Vouet. He was also a print publisher, first on Rue Saint-Denis (Paris) and then on Rue Saint-Jacques.

== Portraits ==
- Bust of Alexander the Great.
- Pope Alexander VII.
- Charles I, king of Great Britain.
- Henri de Bourbon, Prince of Condé.
- Charlotte Marguerite de Montmorency, Princess of Condé.
- Marguerite Gaston, Duchess of Orleans.
- Vladislas IV, King of Poland.

== Subjects after various masters ==
- St. John sitting in the Desert with his Lamb; after Guido.
- The Virgin suckling the Infant; after A. Carracci.
- St. Peter delivered from Prison; after Domenichino.
- The Entombment of Christ; after Barocci.
- A Holy Family, with Angel presenting fruit to the Infant Jesus; after S. Vouet.
- The Dead Christ, with the Marys; after the same.
- St. Jerome; half-length; after Blanchard.
- Thetis ordering Vulcan to forge arms for Achilles; after the same.
- A Charity with five Children; after the same.
- The Visitation of the Virgin to St. Elizabeth; after Corneille.
- The Virgin and Infant; after Sarazin.

He also engraved one hundred small plates for a work entitled, 'La Doctrine des Moeurs,' after the designs of Otto van Veen, 1646; his engravings are mirror-image close copies of the van Veen engravings. He also produced a great number of portraits for a publication entitled, 'Tableaux historiques, où sont graves les illustres Prancois et Etrangers de I'un et 1' autre sexe; par Pierre Daret, Louis Boissevin, et B. Moncomet,' published in 1652 and 1656.

There was also a Pierre Daret, a painter upon vellum and in water-colours, who was living in 1664.
