= Florent le Comte =

French writer and engraver (1655–1712)

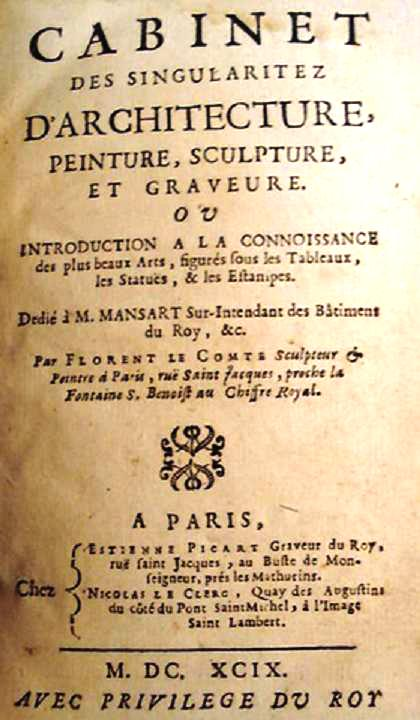
"Cabinet des singularitez d’architecture, peinture, sculpture, et graveure", 1699

Florent le Comte (1655–1712), was a French writer and engraver.

He wrote a comprehensive book about art Cabinet des singularitez which the historian Arnold Houbraken used as a source for Dutch painters active in France, along with similar books on artists by Roger de Piles and André Felibien. Though Houbraken quotes the French title, in his biographical sketch of Romeyn de Hooghe he includes a long citation in Dutch from the Dutch translation.

According to the RKD his Cabinet des singularitez written in 1699 was translated into Dutch in 1708. Though he called himself a painter and sculptor, no works are known.
