= Francesco Bonifaccio =

17th-century Italian painter

Francesco Bonifaccio was an Italian painter of the Baroque period. He was born at Viterbo in 1637, and was a pupil of Pietro da Cortona at the time that Ciro Ferri and Romanelli studied under that master.
