= The Archdukes Albert and Isabella Visiting a Collector's Cabinet =

Painting regarded as by Jan Brueghel the Elder and Hieronymus Francken II

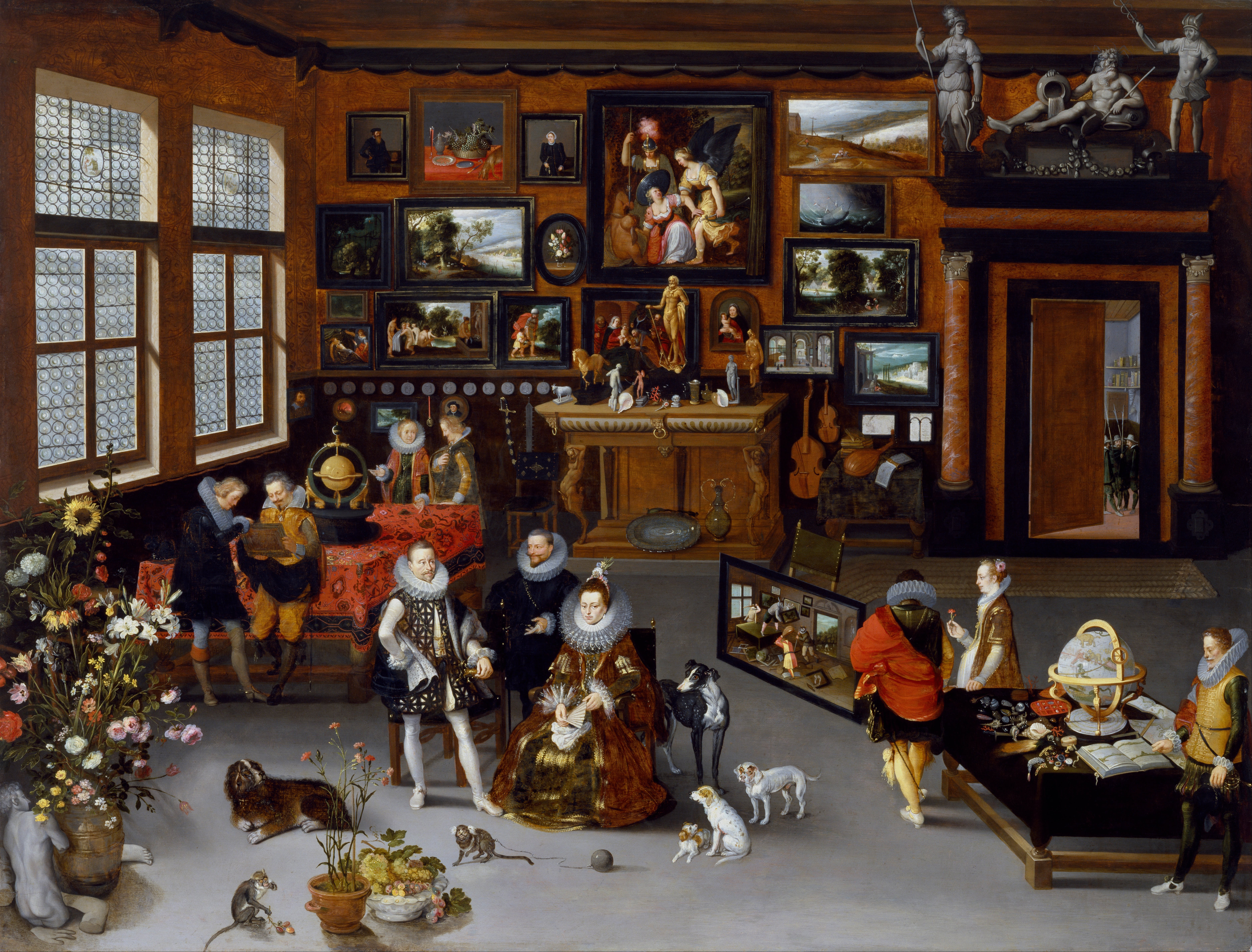
- Artists: Jan Brueghel the Elder and Hieronymus Francken II
- Year: ca. 1621–1623
- Medium: Oil on panel
- Dimensions: 94 cm × 123.3 cm (37 in × 48.5 in)
- Location: The Walters Art Museum, Baltimore

The Archdukes Albert and Isabella Visiting a Collector's Cabinet is a 17th-century Flemish collaborative painting, now regarded as by Jan Brueghel the Elder and Hieronymus Francken II. It is part of the collection of The Walters Art Museum in Baltimore, Maryland.

Archdukes Albert and Isabella jointly ruled the Spanish Netherlands in the beginning of the 17th century and were considered patrons of the arts. Until the death of Albert in 1621, the area of Flanders enjoyed peace and prosperity. This type of painting known as a constkamer, gallery painting or a depiction of a collector's cabinet was popular during this time in Flanders. The painting is deemed a collaborative effort between the artists Jan Brueghel the Elder and Hieronymus Francken II. It had been attributed previously to Hieronymus Francken II's brother Frans Francken the Younger and Adriaen van Stalbemt to whom is attributed a similar work which is now in the collection at the Prado in Madrid.

== Composition ==
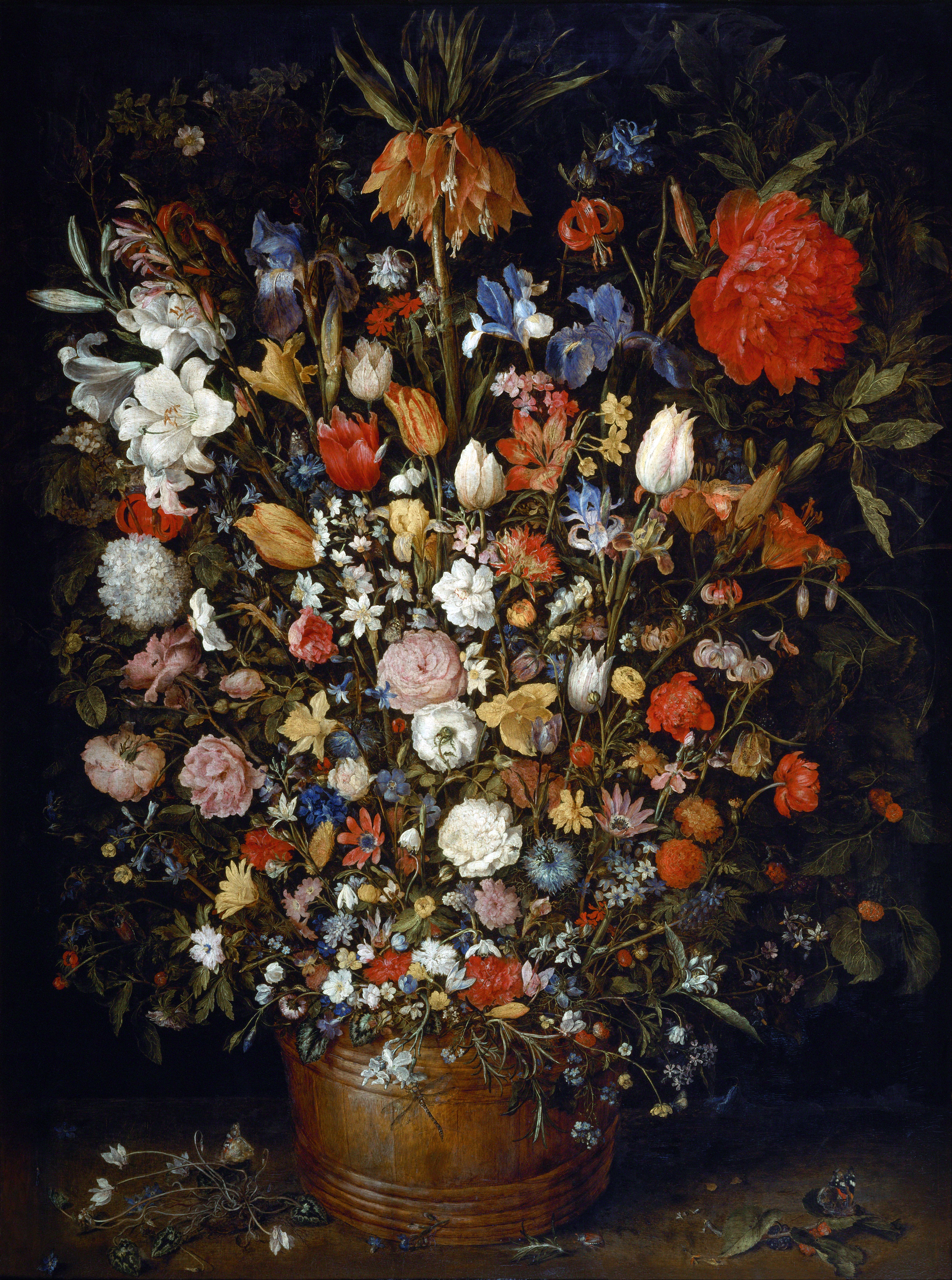
Bouquet. Jan Brueghel the Elder

The painting depicts a large room in which many persons and various art and other objects are present. An unknown Flemish collector accompanies Isabella (seated) and her husband, Albert, who stands behind her. The composition likely does not represent closely any actual occasion. The walls are covered by paintings by Flemish artists and there are also numerous sculptures including the bronze Allegory of Architecture by Giambologna.

The painting contains representations of the wonders of the natural world (animals, plants, and minerals), along with examples of human creativity (painting and sculpture), and attributes of the five senses. As such the composition represents the early phase of the genre of collector's cabinets. During this early ‘encyclopaedic’ phase, the genre reflected the culture of curiosity of that time, when art works, scientific instruments, naturalia and artificialia were equally the object of study and admiration and the cabinets depicted are populated by persons who were as interested in discussing scientific instruments as in admiring paintings.

The painting propped against the chair at the center, Allegory of Iconoclasm depicts an ass, a cat, a fool, and an ape (symbols of ignorance and evil) destroying musical instruments, paintings, and scientific instruments. The painting over the mantel depicts an allegory of Painting being rescued by Wisdom and Fame from Ignorance. The dog, on the left side, appears to have two heads which is a result of the underpainting coming through the surface. The globe on the table at the left is one of Cornelis Drebbels' attempts at a perpetual-motion clock. The large vase of flowers, at the far left corner, is Jan Brueghel's contribution to the painting. The flower arrangement is crowned by a large sunflower (Helianthus annuus), an American flower which can grow to 14 feet tall and turns toward the sun. A recent arrival in Europe, the flower had been illustrated in botanical books, but this is its earliest inclusion in a painting. It is shown turning toward Albert and Isabella instead of toward the sun.

== Interpretation ==
The artworks within the painting such as the Allegory of Iconoclasm and the painting above the mantel representing Painting saved from Ignorance are references to the iconoclasm of the Beeldenstorm that had raged in the Low Countries in the 16th century. The reference offered by the Allegory of Iconoclasm to the iconoclasm of the preceding century provides the meaning for the larger picture: the arts will be protected (as shown by the presence of soldiers in the open door) and flourish under the rule of the archdukes. The sunflower turning toward Albert and Isabella symbolizes the way that the arts will grow and blossom in the light and warmth of princely patronage.

== Other versions ==
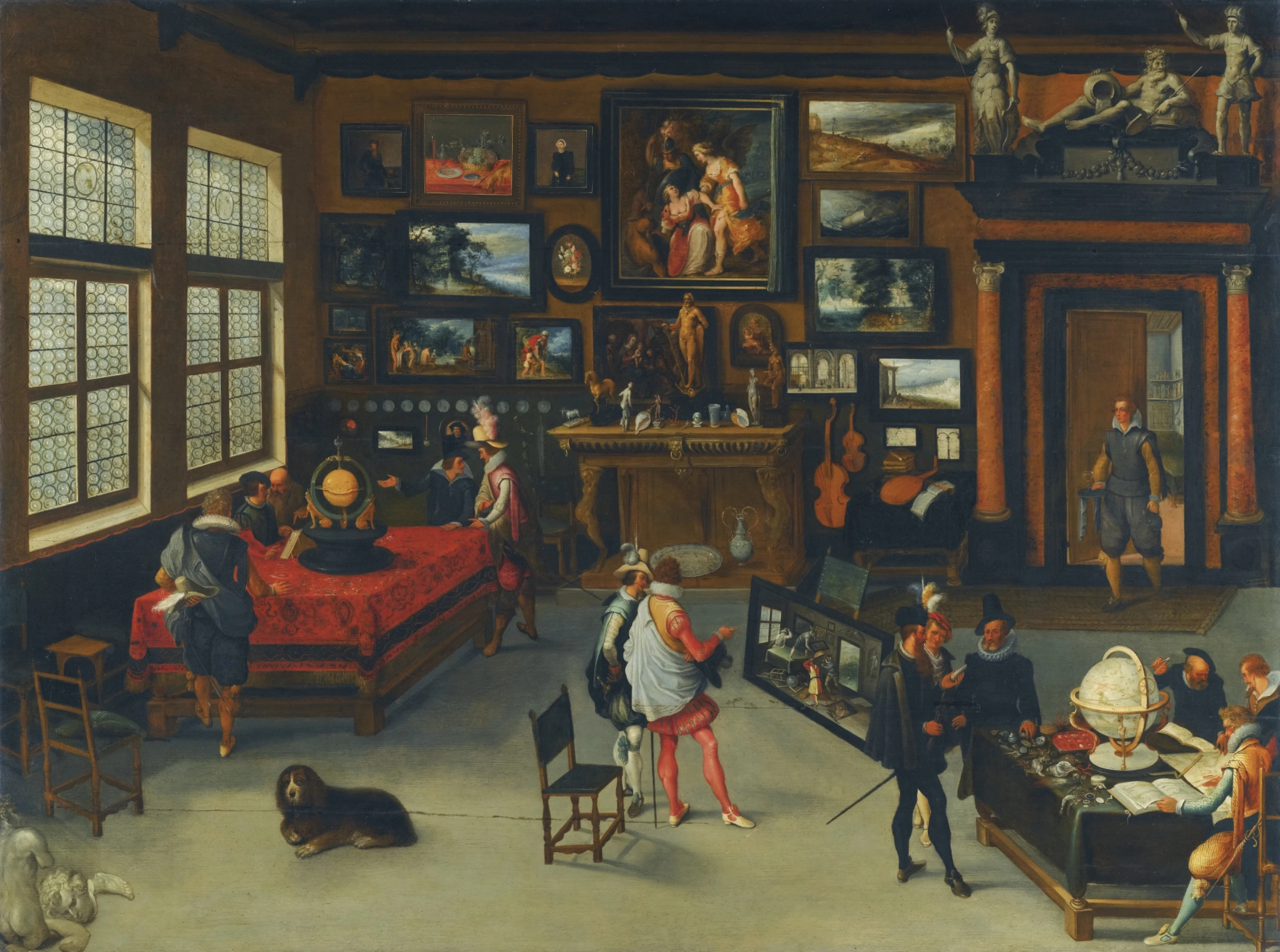
A Collector's Cabinet, private collection

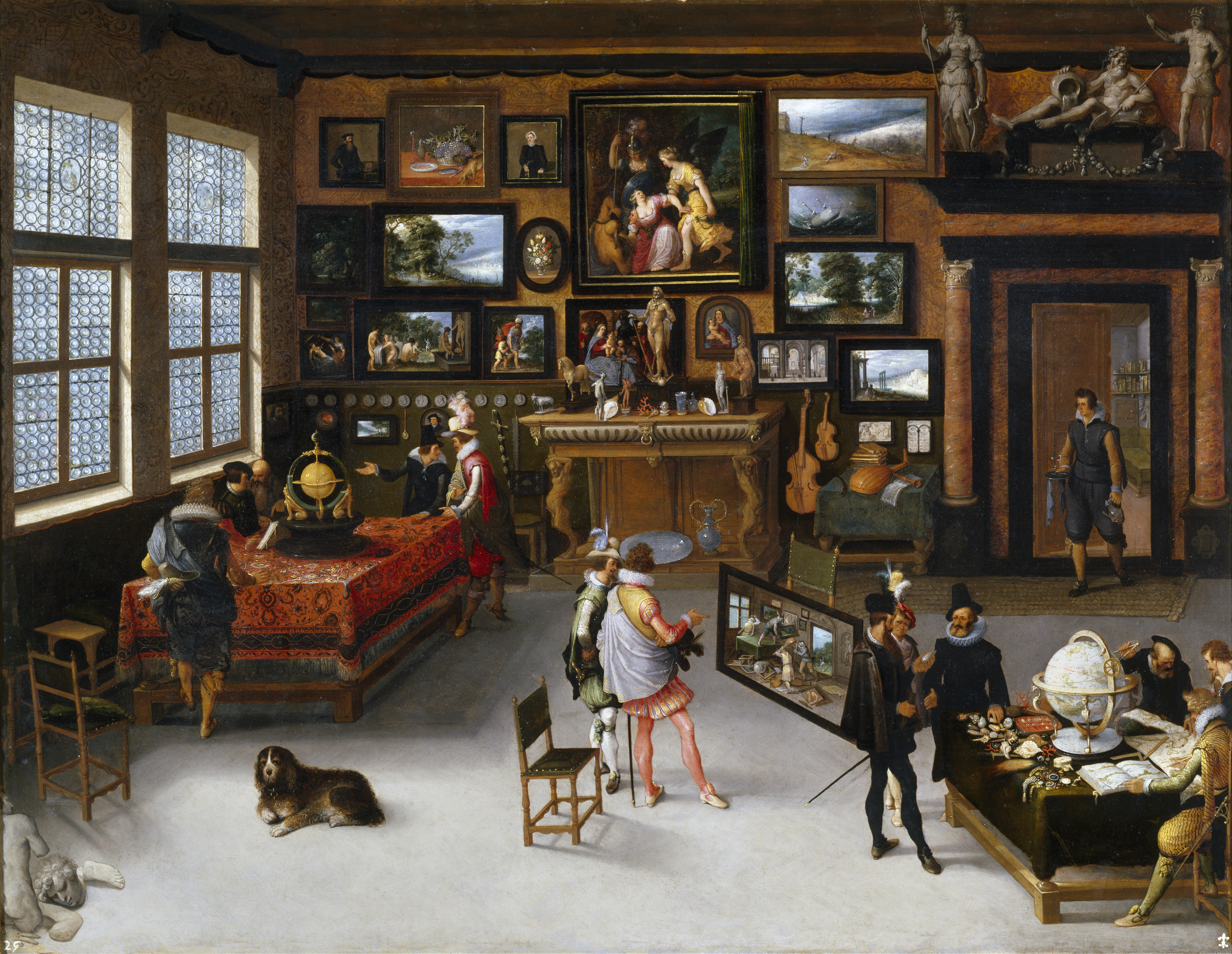
A Collector's Cabinet, Prado

== Variant Titles ==
- The Visit to the Antiquary's
- The Archdukes Albert and Isabella Visiting a Collector's Cabinet
- The Archdukes Albert and Isabella in a Collector's Cabinet
- Visit of the Archduke Albert and the Infanta Isabella to the Antiquary's

== Off the Wall ==
In 2012 The Archdukes Albert and Isabella Visiting a Collector's Cabinet featured in Off the Wall, an open-air exhibition on the streets of Baltimore, Maryland. A reproduction of the painting, the original is part of The Walters Art Museum collection, will be on display at Avenue Antiques. The National Gallery in London began the concept of bringing art out of doors in 2007 and the Detroit Institute of Art introduced the concept in the U.S.. The Off the Wall reproductions of the Walters' paintings are done on weather-resistant vinyl and include a description of the painting and a QR code for smart phones.
