= Niccola Ricciolini =

Italian painter

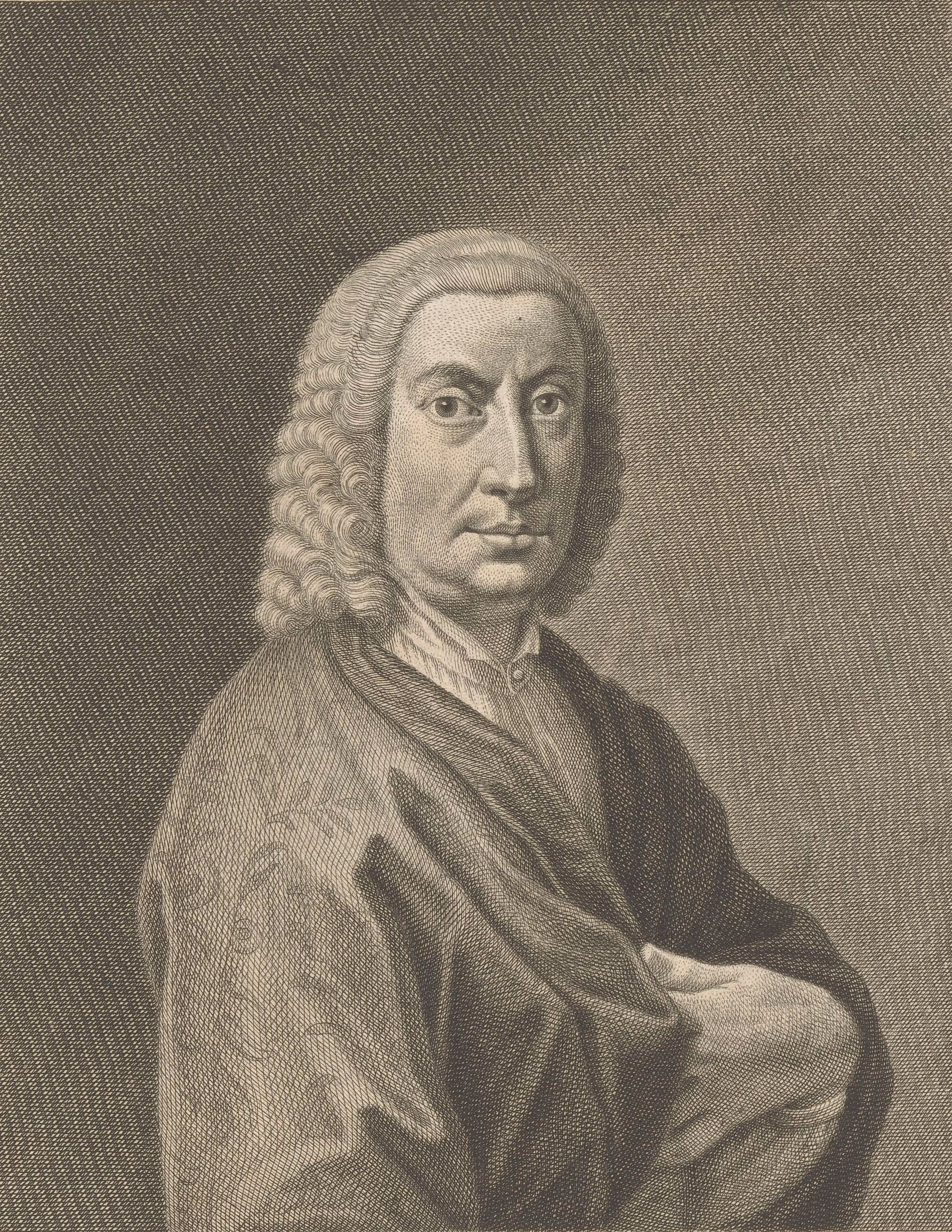
- Born: 1 February 1687; Rome
- Died: 15 October 1772 (aged 85); Rome
- Occupation: Painter

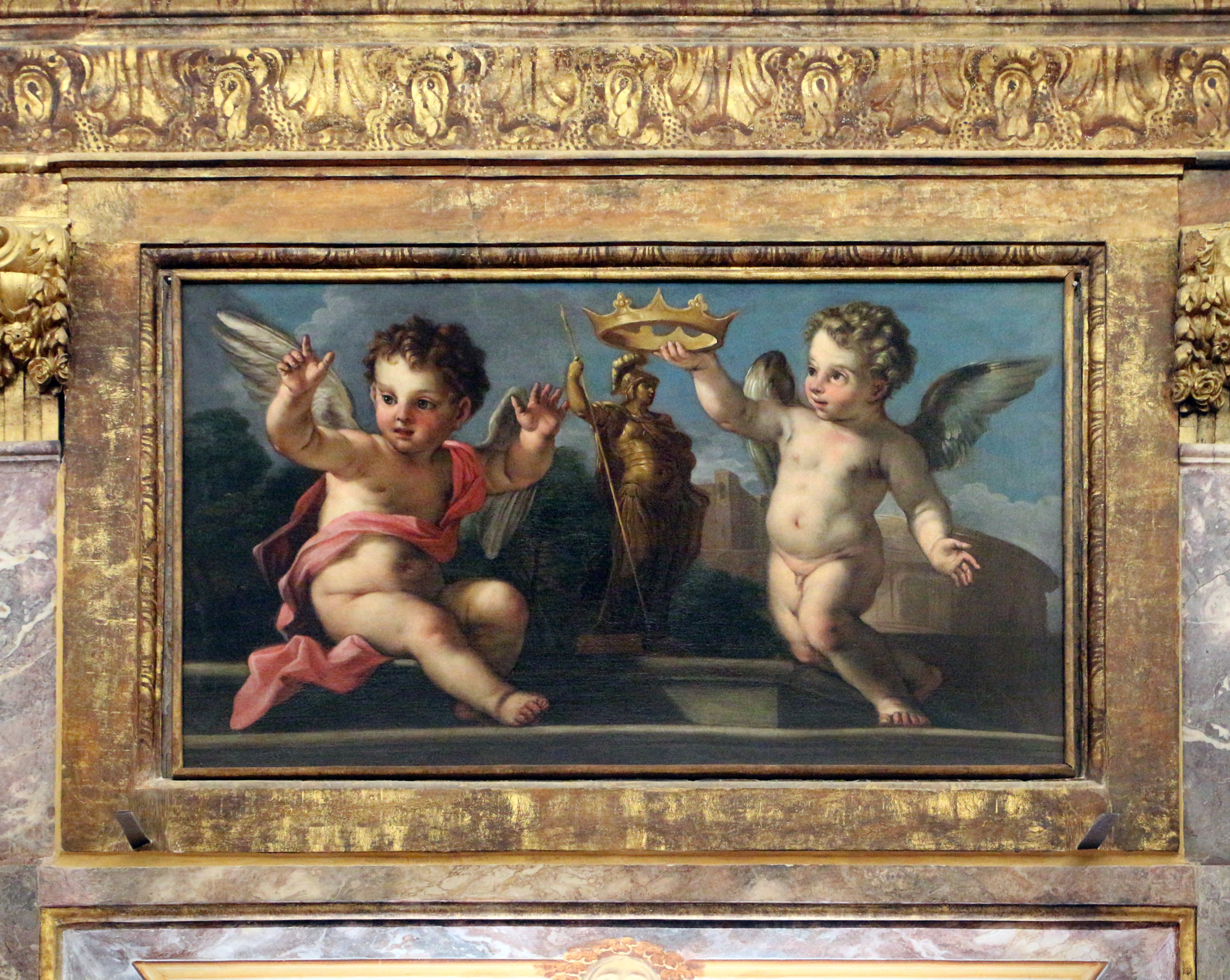
Puttos in palazzo Ricciolini, Macerata

Niccola Ricciolini (Rome 1687-Rome 1772) was an Italian painter of the Baroque period. He was born at Rome and was a pupil of Pietro da Cortona. He competed against Marcantonio Franceschini with cartoons for the mosaic decoration of the Vatican. His designs led to the mosaics of Crucifixion of St. Peter (in mosaic) and a painting of Descent from the Cross.
