= Carl Ferdinand Fabritius =

German painter (1637–1673)

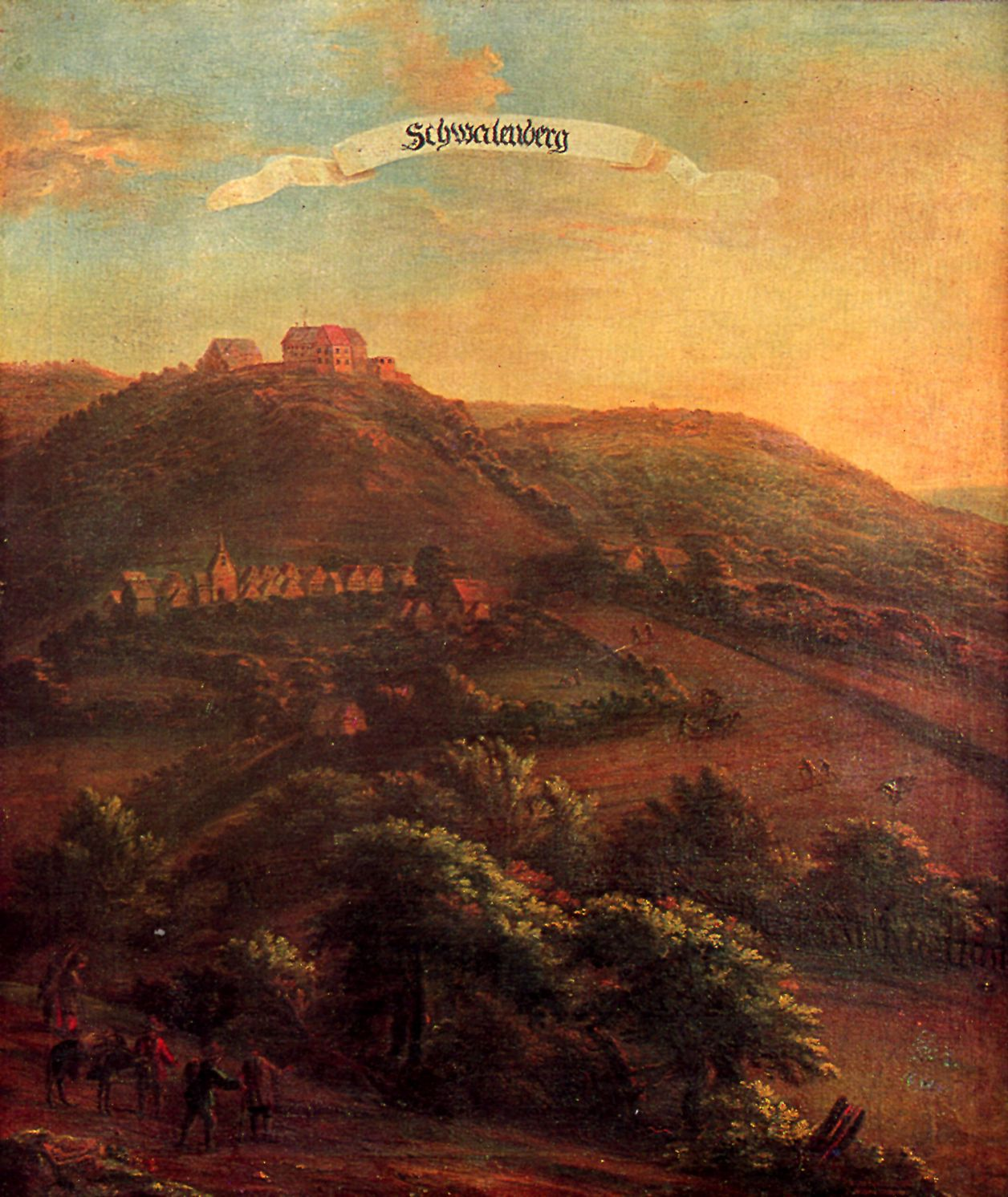
Schieder-Schwalenberg (Lippe), view with the Schwalenberg, 1664

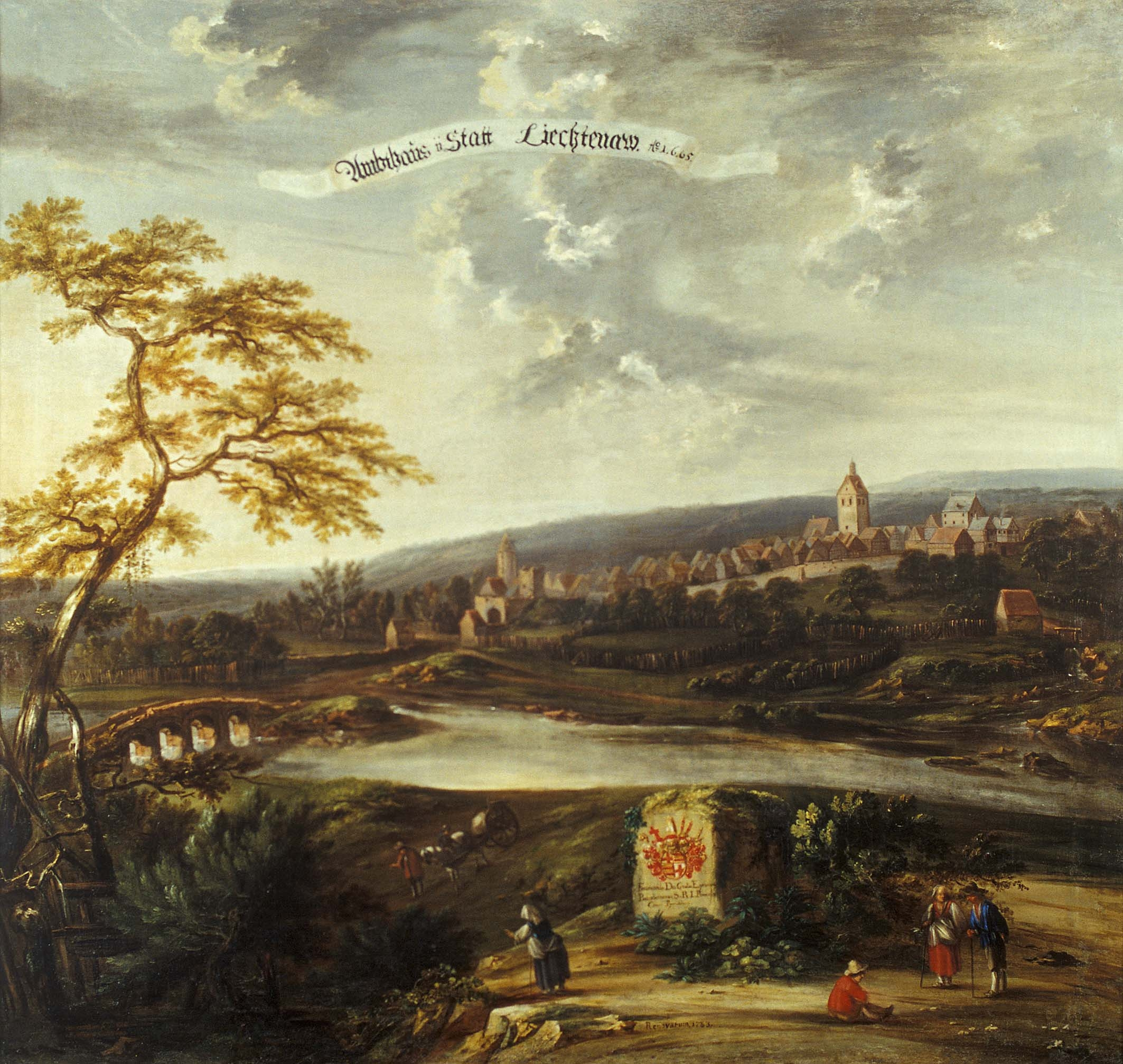
Lichtenau, 1665

Carl Ferdinand Fabritius (1637 – 21 January 1673) was a painter in the Bishopric of Paderborn (German: Fürstbistum Paderborn). Paderborn prince-bishop (German: Fürstbischof) Ferdinand of Fürstenberg commissioned Fabritius to paint 63 landscape paintings of the towns and villages in his diocese from 1664 to 1667. The paintings were commissioned for display at the prince-bishop's residence Neuhaus near Paderborn.

Carl Ferdinand Fabritius was born in Warsaw but lived in Vienna from 1659 to his death in 1673.

== List of works ==
- 1664 Schieder-Schwalenberg (Lippe), Ansicht mit Burg Schwalenberg, oil on canvas, 88.5 × 103.5 cm, Erzbischöfliche Akademische Bibliothek Paderborn
- 1665 Ambthaus u. Statt Liechtenaw Anno 1665, oil on canvas, Erzbischöfliche Akademische Bibliothek Paderborn
- 1665 Ambthauss Bocke 1665, oil on canvas, Erzbischöfliche Akademische Bibliothek Paderborn
- 1665 Closter Bödeke 1665, oil on canvas, Erzbischöfliche Akademische Bibliothek Paderborn
- 1666 Westenholzer Schling, oil on canvas, Erzbischöfliche Akademische Bibliothek Paderborn

== See also ==
- List of German painters
