= Nicolas Jean Baptiste Poilly =

French draftsman and engraver

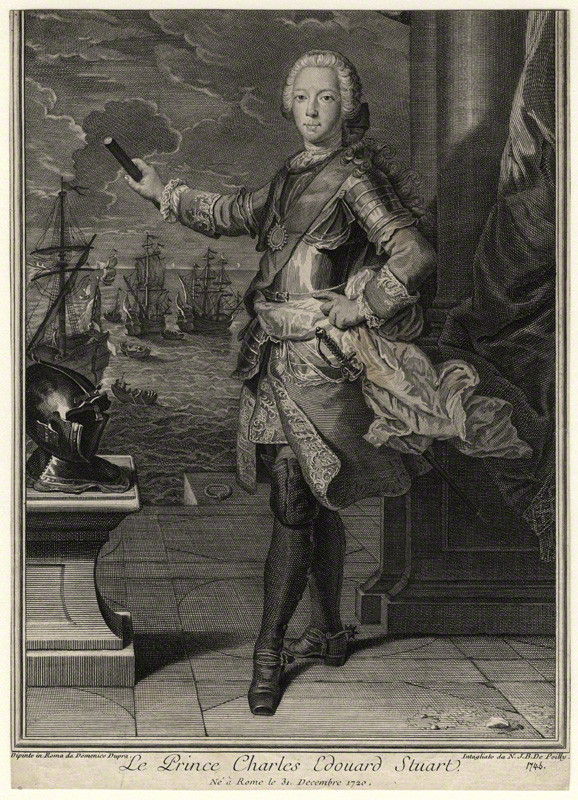
Prince Charles Edward Stuart by Nicolas Jean Baptiste Poilly, 1746, after Domenico Duprà, in the collection of the National Portrait Gallery, London

Nicolas Jean Baptiste Poilly (1707–1780) was a French draftsman and engraver. His work is held in the collection of the Cooper-Hewitt, National Design Museum and the National Portrait Gallery, London.
