= Cornelis de Baellieur =

Flemish painter

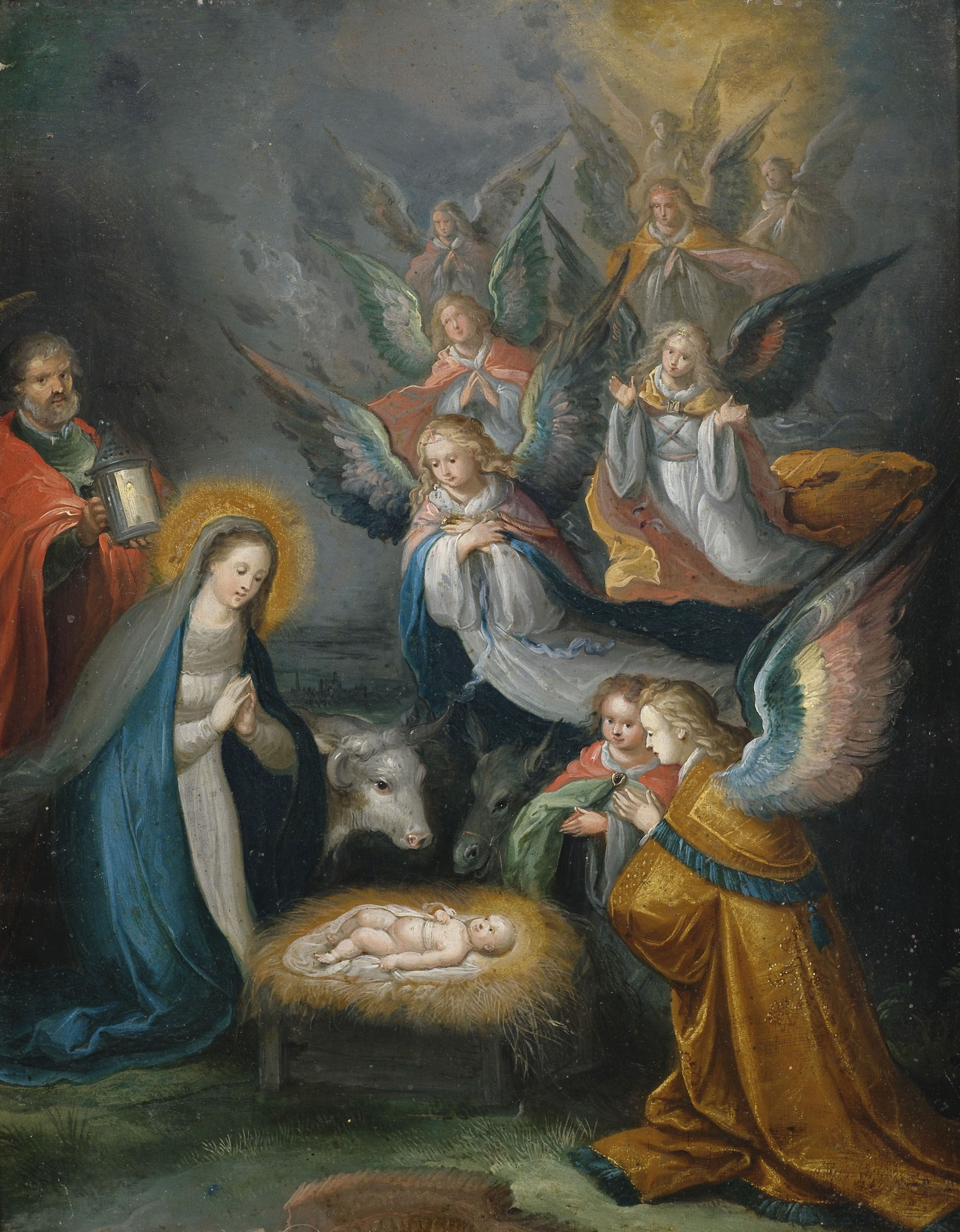
Adoration of the Shepherds

Cornelis de Baellieur (1607, Antwerp – 1671, Antwerp), was a Flemish Baroque painter.

== Biography ==
According to the RKD he was a pupil of Anthonis Liesaert and is known for paintings of art galleries such as Interior of an Art Gallery. He became a master in the Antwerp Guild of St. Luke in 1626. He drew figures in the paintings of other painters, such as Hans III Jordaens.
