= Aftermath of the Eighty Years' War =

The aftermath of the Eighty Years' War (c. 1568–1648) had far-reaching military, political, socio-economic, religious, and cultural effects on the Low Countries, the Spanish Empire, the Holy Roman Empire, as well as other regions of Europe and European colonies overseas. By the Peace of Münster (15 May 1648), the Habsburg Netherlands were split in two, with the northern Protestant-dominated Netherlands becoming the Dutch Republic, independent of the Spanish and Holy Roman Empires, while the southern Catholic-dominated Spanish Netherlands remained under Spanish Habsburg sovereignty. Whereas the Spanish Empire and the Southern Netherlands along with it were financially and demographically ruined, declining politically and economically, the Dutch Republic became a global commercial power and achieved a high level of prosperity for its upper and middle classes known as the Dutch Golden Age, despite continued great socio-economic, geographic and religious inequalities and problems, as well as internal and external political, military and religious conflicts.

== Military effects ==
=== Nature of the war ===
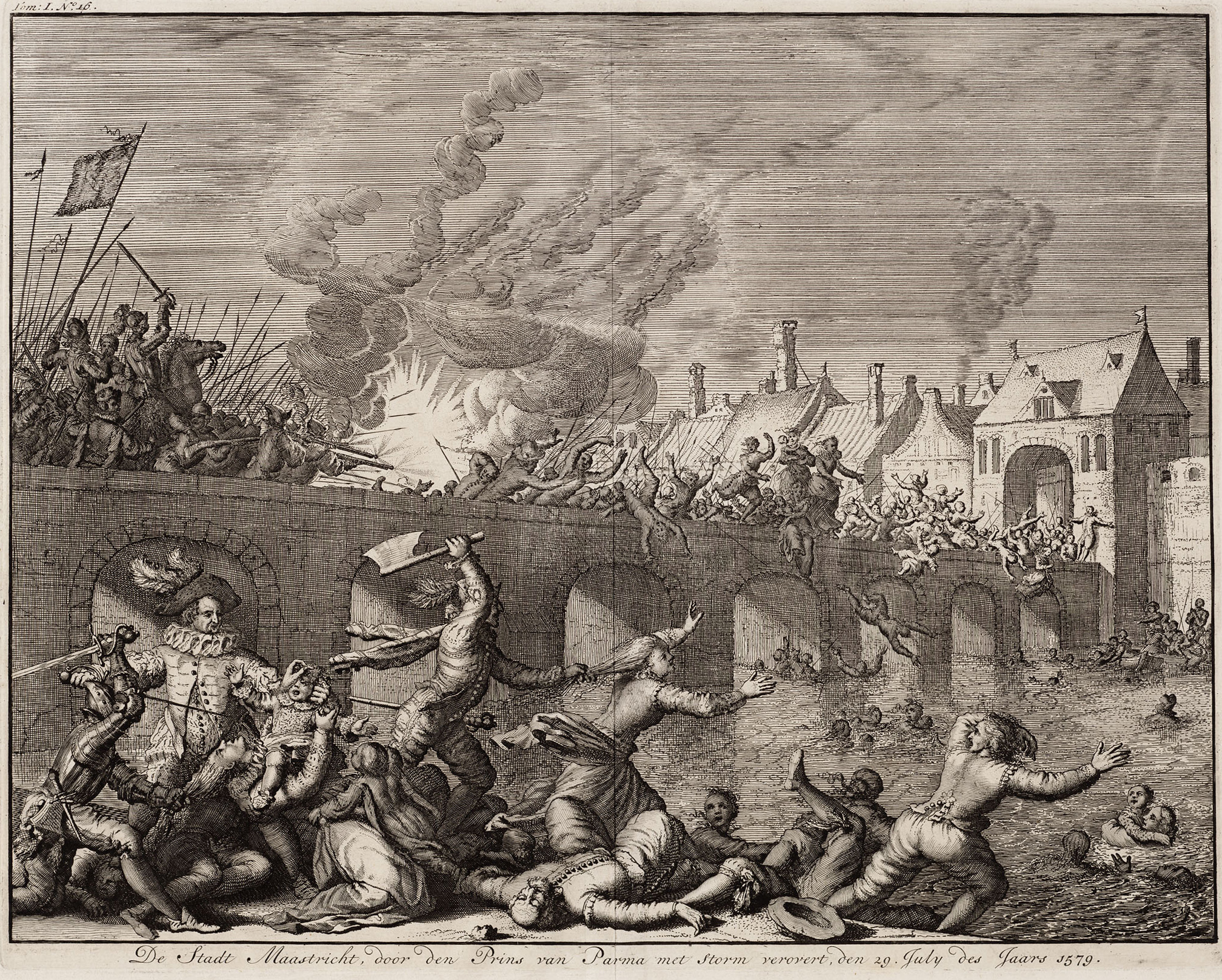
The Spanish Fury at Maastricht in 1579

As the revolt and its suppression centered largely around issues of religious freedom and taxation, the conflict necessarily involved not only soldiers, but also civilians at all levels of society. This may be one reason for the resolve and subsequent successes of the Dutch rebels in defending cities. Another factor was that the unpopularity of the Spanish army, which existed even before the start of the revolt, was exacerbated when in the early stage of the war a few cities were purposely sacked by the Spanish troops after having surrendered; this was done as a practice to intimidate the remaining rebel cities into surrender.

In the later stages, Maurice raised a professional standing army that was even paid when no hostilities were taking place, a radical innovation in that time and part of the Military Revolution.

=== Psychological impact ===
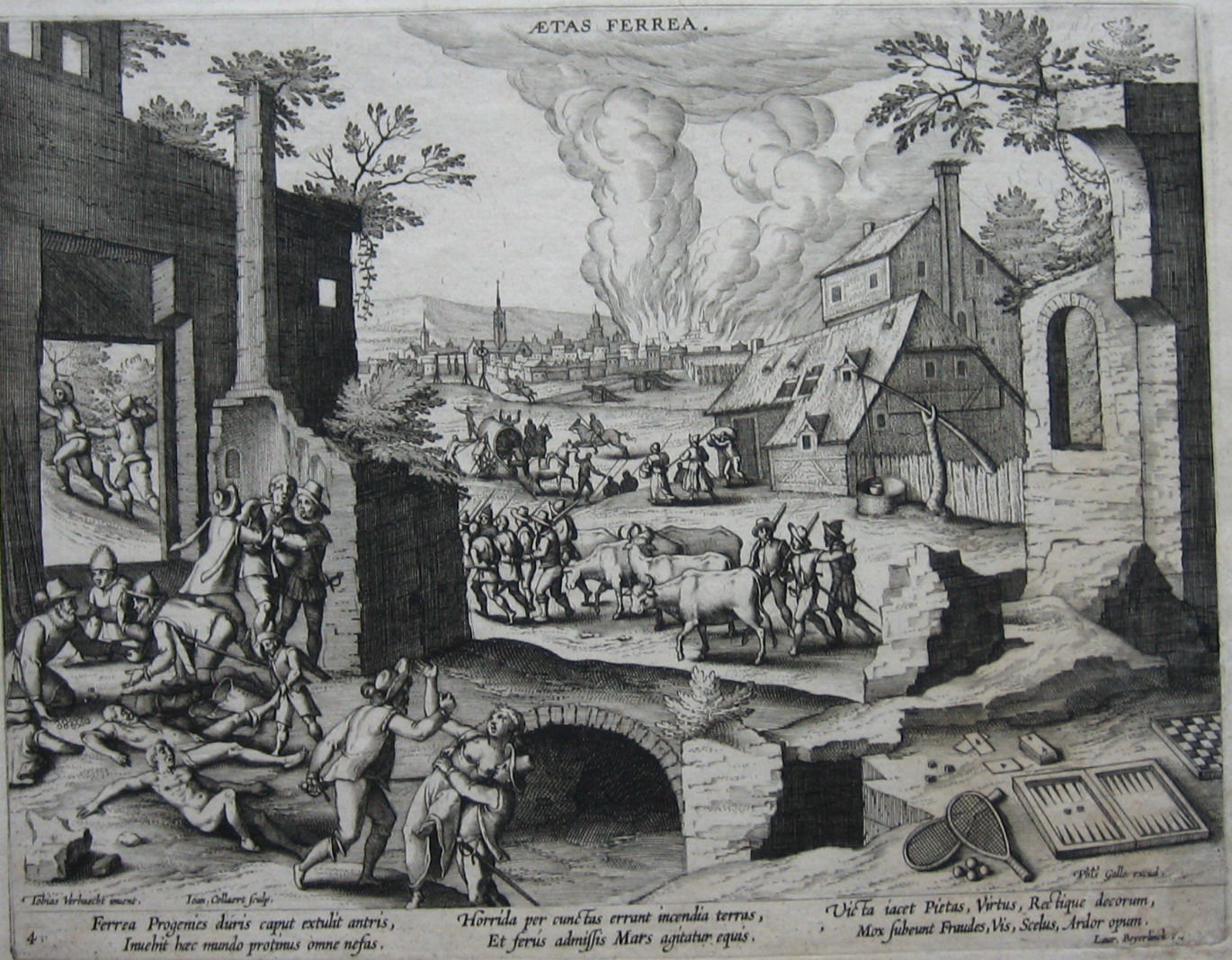
Aetas Ferrea. This engraving by Hans Collaert likens the devastation caused by the war to the Iron Age of Greek mythology.

The success of the Dutch Republic in its struggle to get away from the Spanish Crown had damaged Spain's Reputación, a concept that, according to Olivares' biographer J. H. Elliot, strongly motivated that statesman. In the minds of Spaniards the land of Flanders became linked to war. The idea of a second Flanders—a place of "endless war, suffering and death"—haunted the Spanish for many years after the war ended. In the 16th and 17th centuries the concept of a second or "another" Flanders was variously used while referring to the 1591 situation in Aragón, the Catalan Revolt and the 1673 rebellion in Messina. Jesuit father Diego de Rosales described Chile from a military point of view as "Indian Flanders" (Flandes indiano), a phrase that was later adopted by historian Gabriel Guarda.

=== Military outcome ===
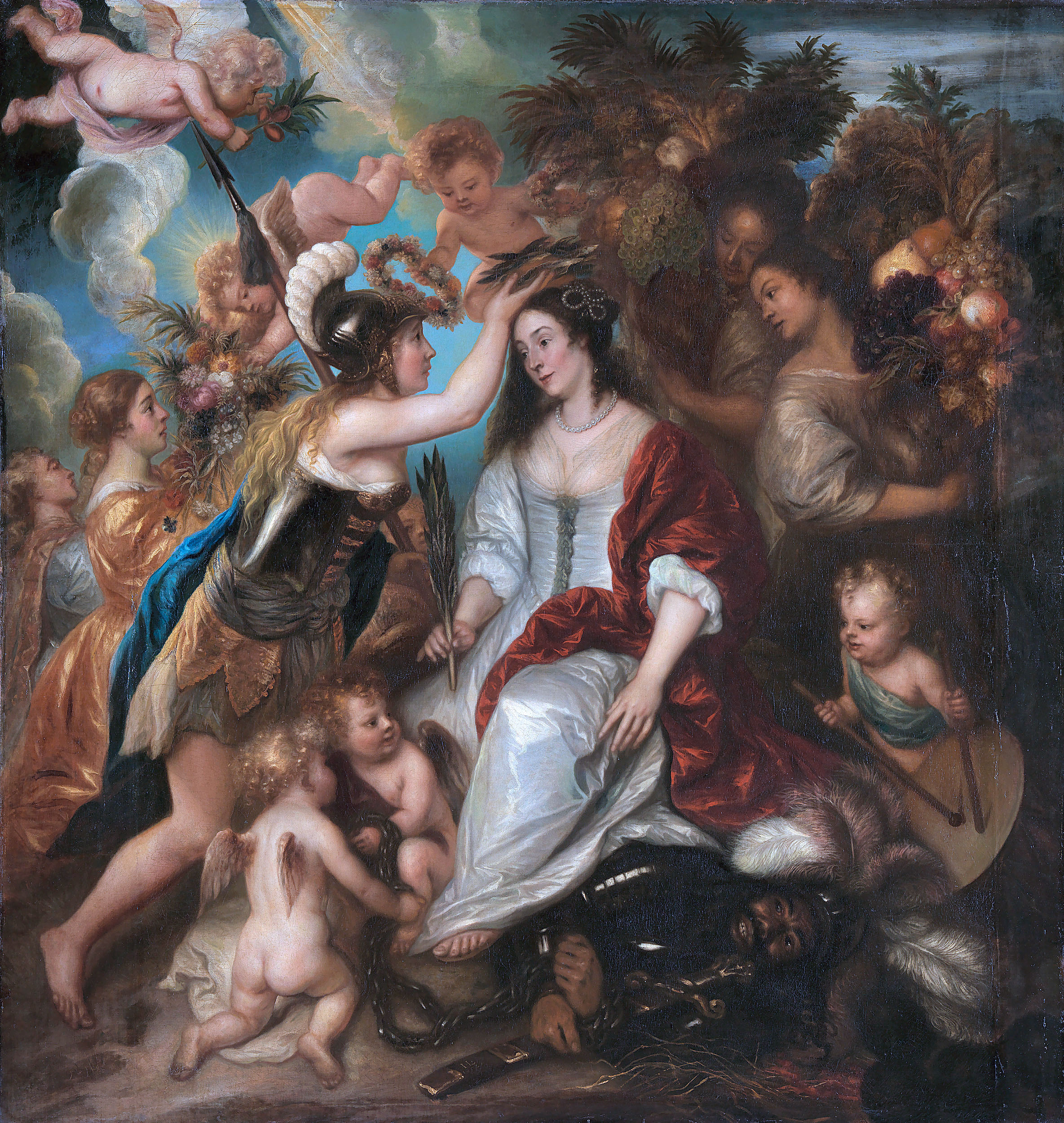
Jan Lievens' Allegory of Peace, painted to celebrate the Peace of Münster

The French and Dutch had originally agreed to join forces in negotiating with Spain. (Note: In 1635, the Dutch States-General and France had agreed: 'Rien ne sera conclué entre la France et l'Espagne, si en mesme temps le Traité d'entre l'Espagne et Messieurs les Estats n'est aussij conclud.' ("Nothing will be concluded between France and Spain, if not also the Treaty between Spain and the Lords States is concluded at the same time.")) While the willing Dutch and Spanish had been able to establish the text of their peace treaty by January 1648, the French and Spanish still could not reach any agreements, and the French were trying to withhold their Dutch allies from sealing the deal; the Republic's annoyed negotiators felt the "selfish" French were stalling for time to gain more Spanish concessions over the back of the Dutch. (Note: 'Toen de Fransen "versochten, indien Spagnien sich met haer [de Fransen] niet wilde accomoderen, dat wij [de Nederlanders] ons tractaet niet souden voltrecken" – toen was het zonneklaar. Frankrijk wilde meer winst behalen en trachtte het Staatse belang aan zijn zelfzucht ondergeschikt te maken: dat was 'tergiverseren', opzettelijk dwarsbomen.' ("When the French 'requested, in case Spain would not accommodate to them [the French], that we [the Dutch] would not conclude our treaty' – it was obvious. France was trying to make more profit and attempted to submit the States' interest to its own selfishness: that was "tergiverseren", deliberate obstruction.")) The Dutch decided to conclude a separate peace with Spain on 30 January 1648, confirmed on 15 May 1648, while there was still no sign of Franco–Spanish rapprochement. And so the Franco-Spanish War continued for 11 more years until the Treaty of the Pyrenees of 1659.

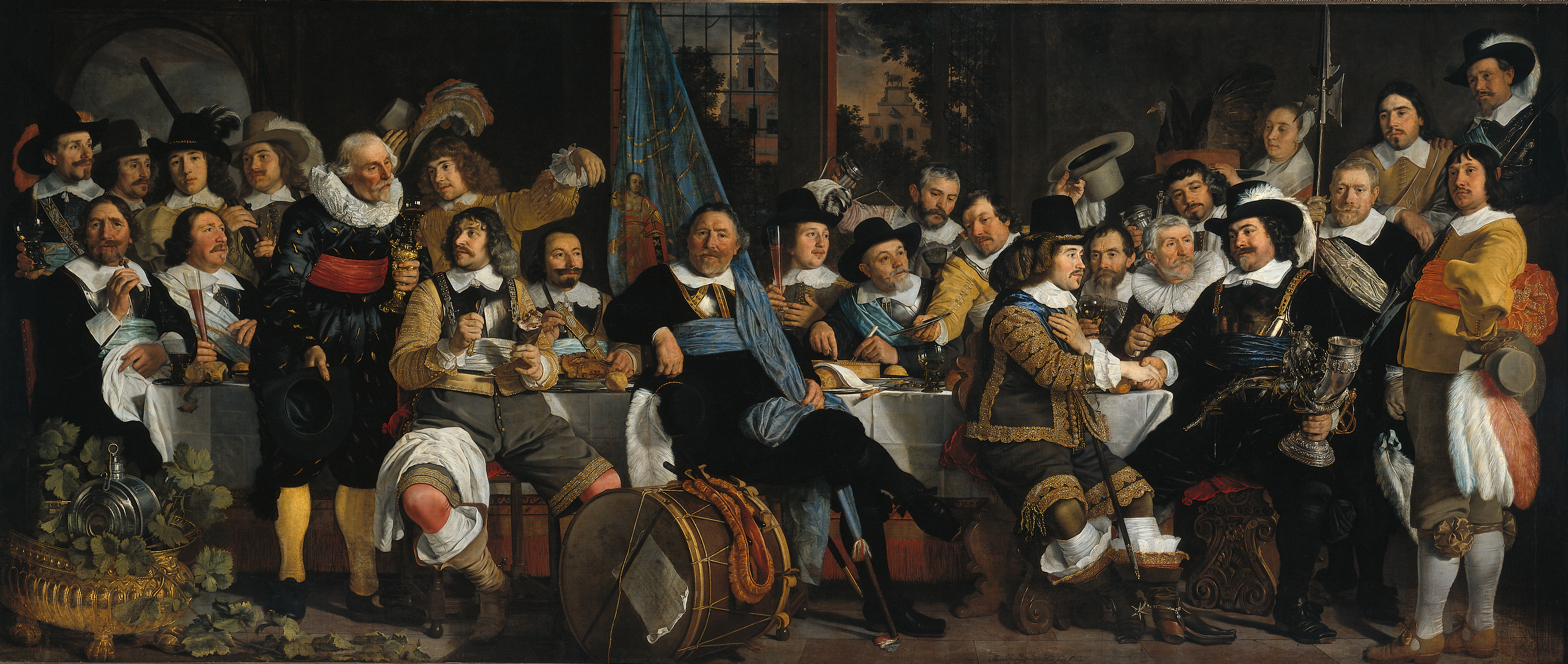
Banquet of the Amsterdam Civic Guard in Celebration of the Peace of Münster (1648), painted by Bartholomeus van der Helst

On the other hand, the Hispano–Dutch Peace Treaty of Münster (Tractatus Pacis, "Treaty of Peace") did serve as an example for the treaties between France and the Holy Roman Empire (Instrumentum Pacis Monasteriensis (IPM), "Instrument of Peace of Münster") and Sweden and the Holy Roman Empire (Instrumentum Pacis Osnabrugensis (IPO), "Instrument of Peace of Osnabrück") of 24 October 1648. The three treaties are collectively known as the Peace of Westphalia. Aside from achieving independence from the House of Habsburg, the Dutch Republic and the Old Swiss Confederacy also gained de jure independence from the Holy Roman Empire, although in both cases it was just a formalisation of a de facto situation that had already existed for a long time. In the Dutch Republic, the peace was solemnly promulgated on 5 June 1648, on the 80th anniversary of the execution of the Counts of Egmont and Horne, (Note: The Dutch States-General, for dramatic effect, decided to promulgate the ratification of the Peace of Münster (which was actually ratified by them on 15 May 1648) on the 80th anniversary of the execution of the Counts of Egmont and Horne, 5 June 1648.) and celebrated across most of the country with sumptuous festivities. The province of Zeeland and the city of Leiden, who had been opposed to peace, refused to hold celebrations, but did promulgate the peace treaty.

Portugal was no party in the 1648 Peace of Münster, and the overseas Dutch–Portuguese War (1602–1663) resumed fiercely after the expiration of the ten-year truce of 1640. In Brazil and Africa the Portuguese managed to reconquer most of the territory lost to the WIC in the early 1640s after a long struggle. However, this occasioned a short war in Europe in the years 1657–60, during which the VOC completed its conquests in Ceylon and the coastal areas of the Indian subcontinent. Portugal was forced to indemnify the WIC for its losses in Brazil.

As newly emerging commercial world powers, the Dutch Republic and the Commonwealth of England would come to heads in the First Anglo–Dutch War (1652–1654), only four years after the peace was signed. The Dutch were defeated and forced to sign the Act of Seclusion, promising to never appoint another member of the House of Orange as stadtholder or captain-general of the United Provinces. In the aftermath, Johan de Witt rose to prominence in the Dutch Republic, significantly increasing its international standing.

== Political effects ==
=== Dutch States Party versus Orangists ===
==== Post-war crisis ====
Soon after the conclusion of the peace the political system of the Republic entered a crisis. The same forces that had sustained the Oldenbarnevelt regime in Holland, and that had been so thoroughly shattered after Maurice of Orange's 1618 coup, had finally coalesced again around what was to become known as the Dutch States Party faction. This faction around Andries Bicker, Adriaan Pauw, Jacob de Witt and Cornelis de Graeff had slowly been gaining prominence during the 1640s until they had forced Frederick Henry to support the peace. And now they wanted their peace dividend. The new stadtholder, William II, on the other hand, far less adept as a politician than his father, hoped to continue the predominance of the stadtholderate and the Orangist faction (mostly the aristocracy and the Counter-Remonstrant regents) as in the years before 1640. Above all, he wanted to maintain the large wartime military establishment, even though the peace made that superfluous.

==== William II's 1650 coup attempt ====
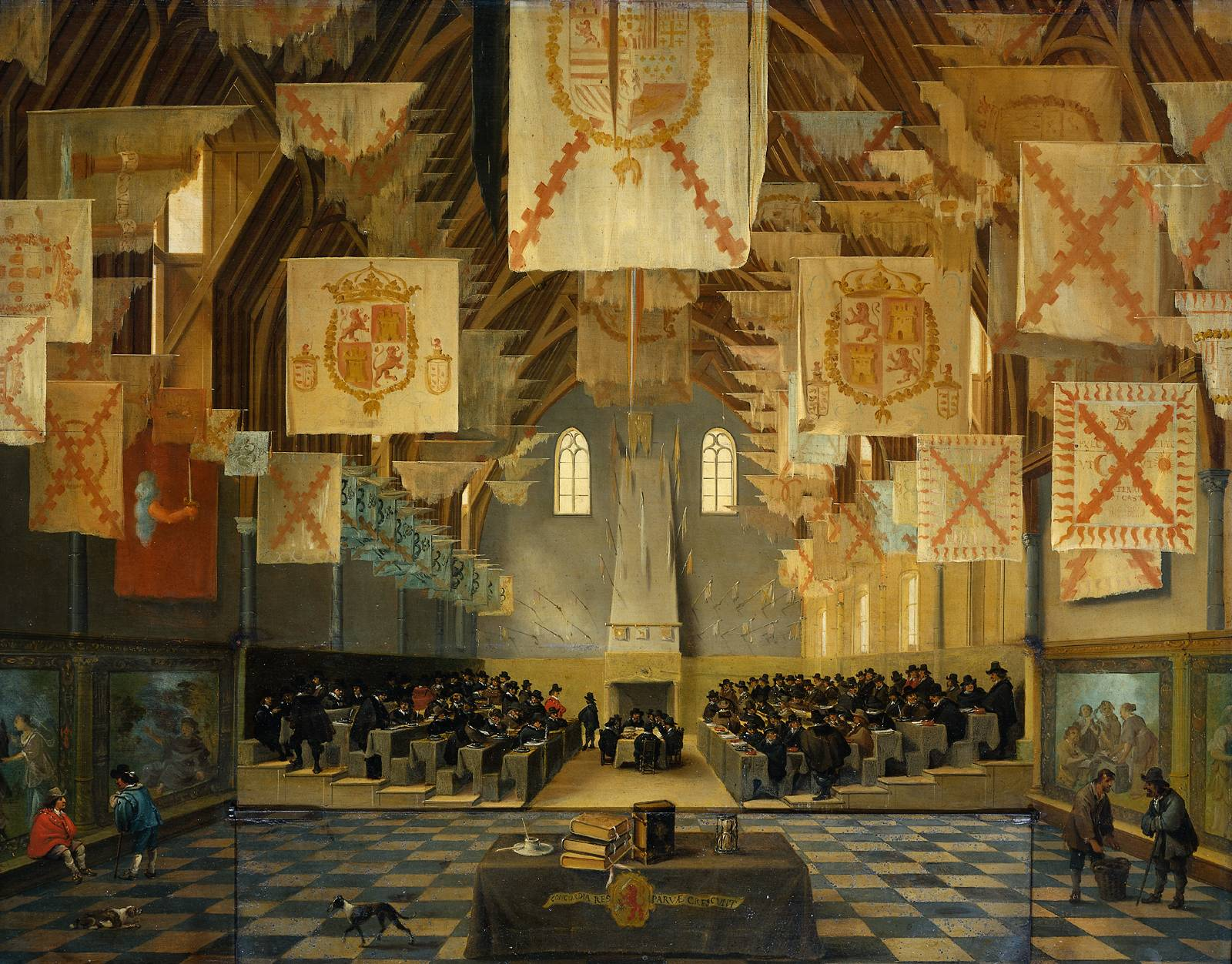
The Grand Assembly of 1651 decided to appoint no new stadtholder, commencing the First Stadtholderless Period.

William II, Prince of Orange, since 1647 the stadtholder of all provinces except Friesland, was disgruntled with the Peace of Münster, as waging war gave him a powerful position as commander-in-chief of the armed forces. He secretly negotiated with France to declare war on Spain again, and also planned to invade England in order to avenge the 1649 Execution of Charles I, his father-in-law. On the other hand, the States of Holland sought to reduce the size of the army and cut upkeep costs now that peace had been established, clashing with William's desire for a strong military. The two points of view were irreconcilable. When the States-Party regents around Andries Bicker started to cut down the size of the standing army to a peacetime complement of about 30,000, a struggle for power in the Republic ensued. When negotiations for a compromise failed, the States of Holland unilaterally decided to suspend paying the troops, resulting in William II attempting a coup in July 1650 by abducting several leading Hollandic regenten and leading his army in an Attack on Amsterdam. In this sense, he finally followed the path of his uncle Maurice. However, the army got lost, and by the time it reached the city, the defences had been prepared, and William had to concede defeat. When he unexpectedly died shortly after on 6 November 1650 to smallpox, the States-General decided not to appoint a new stadtholder, leading to the First Stadtholderless Period (1650–1672). The power-vacuum which followed was quickly filled by the States-Party regents, who founded a new republican regime.

=== Political implications in Europe ===
The Holy Roman Empire in 1648. While the Spanish Netherlands and the County of Burgundy (yellow) remained part of the Empire, the Dutch Republic and Old Swiss Confederacy obtained their independence, and the right of German princes to choose their state religion was confirmed.

The Dutch revolt against their lawful sovereign, most obviously illustrated in the Act of Abjuration (1581), implied that a sovereign could be deposed by the population if there was agreement that he did not fulfill his God-given responsibility. This act by the Dutch challenged the concept of the divine right of kings, and eventually led to the formation of the Dutch Republic. Both the Dutch Republic and the Old Swiss Confederacy obtained independence from not just their previous Habsburg overlords, but also the Holy Roman Empire.

Moreover, certain powers asserted by Emperor Ferdinand III were stripped from him and bestowed upon the rulers of the Imperial States, including choosing a state religion. Catholics and Protestants were redefined as equal before the law, and Calvinism was given legal recognition as an official religion. All parties would recognise the Peace of Augsburg of 1555, in which each prince had the right to determine the religion of his own state (the principle of cuius regio, eius religio). However, the ius reformandi was removed: Subjects were no longer forced to follow the conversion of their ruler. Rulers were allowed to choose Catholicism, Lutheranism, or Calvinism. 1 January 1624 was defined as the normative date for determining the dominant religion of a state. All ecclesiastical property was to be restored to the condition of 1624. Christians living in principalities where their denomination was not the established church were guaranteed the right to practice their faith in private, as well as in public during allotted hours. The independence of the Dutch Republic, which practiced religious toleration, also provided a safe haven for European Jews.

The Holy See was very displeased at the settlement, with Pope Innocent X calling it "null, void, invalid, iniquitous, unjust, damnable, reprobate, inane, empty of meaning and effect for all time" in the bull Zelo Domus Dei.

The Peace of Westphalia marked the start of a new period of European history, in which a far larger number of wholly or partially sovereign princes of the Holy Roman Empire than before would play a role in the political arena for centuries to come. This also increased the risk of conflicts between them, and therefore France and Sweden were given the status of generally accepted powers of guaranteeing the peace. Although this was a first attempt at a European security system, it would turn out not to be particularly effective.

== Socio-economics effects ==
=== Effect on the Low Countries ===
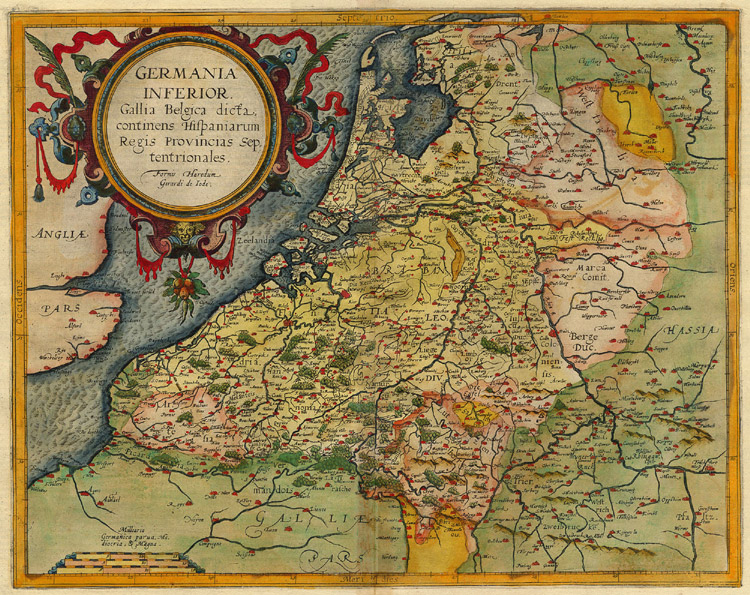
Map of the Netherlands c. 1593 by Cornelis de Jode

==== War-time violence and devastation ====
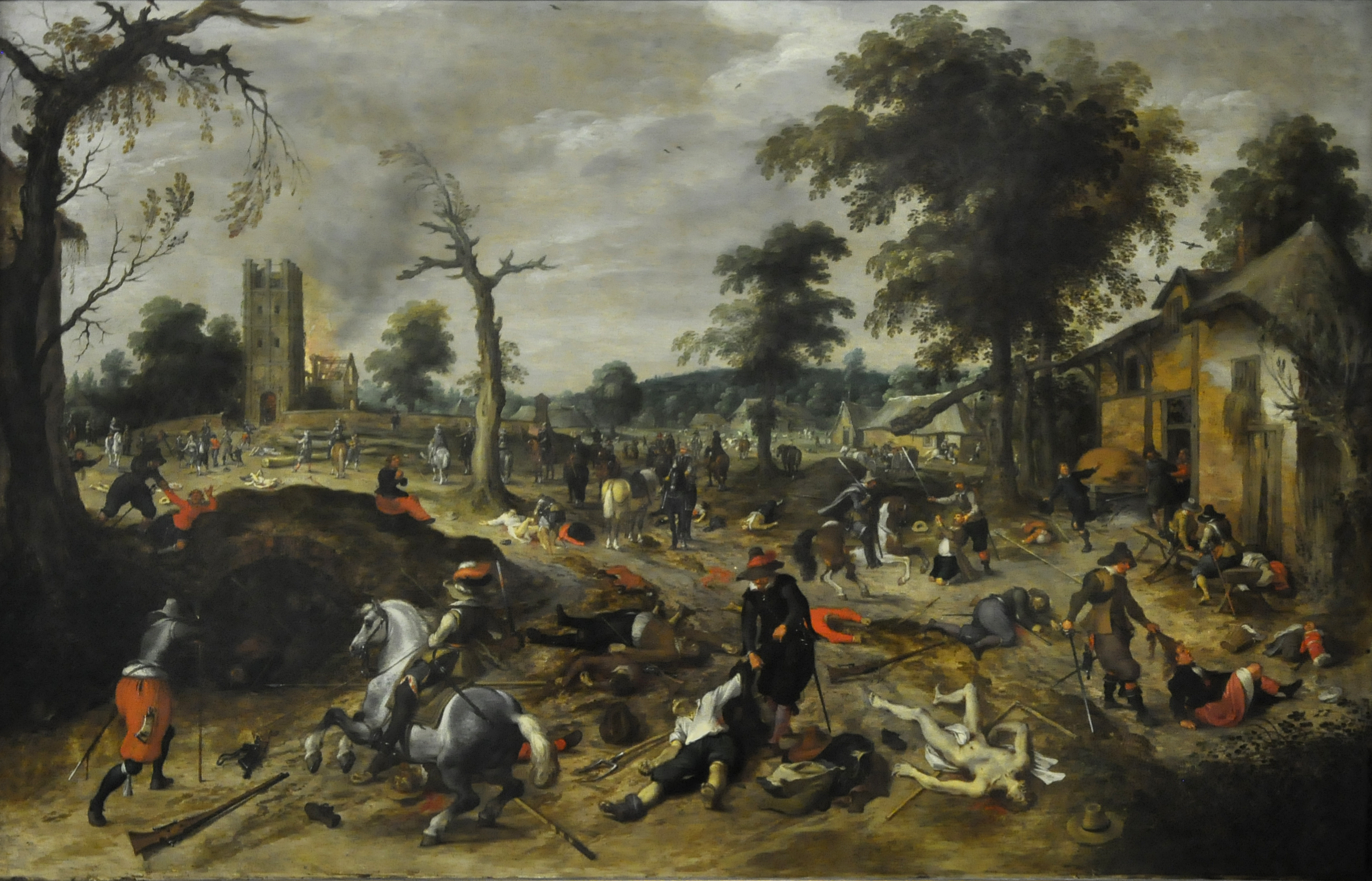
The aftermath of the plundering of the village of Wommelgem in 1589

The chaotic and dramatic early decades of the Eighty Years' War, which were filled with civil revolts and large-scale urban massacres, largely ended for the provinces north of the Great Rivers after they proclaimed the Republic in 1588, expelled the Spanish forces and established peace, safety and prosperity for their population. In literature, the last few decades have often been considered a rather 'regulated' and 'professional' armed conflict in the borderlands of the Dutch Republic and the Spanish Southern Netherlands, which is less interesting to recount, because the ideological struggle had essentially been decided. (Note: Van der Lem (1995): 'As soon as [the 1588 States-General's decision to wage offensive war] had been taken, the continuation of the 'Revolt' or 'Eighty Years' War' became a regulated war. The ideological element did retain a role, but disappeared to the background. (...) The course of the struggle is henceforth a military one, in which not all conquests and losses need be remembered.') However, the countryside in especially Brabant, Flanders and the lands constituting the modern two provinces of Belgian and Dutch Limburg continued to be devastated by decades of uninterrupted warfare, with armies forcing farmers to hand over their food, or destroying their crops to deny food to the enemy. Both parties levied taxes on farmers in the still-contested environs of 's-Hertogenbosch after the Dutch conquered it in 1629. Towns such as Helmond, Eindhoven and Oisterwijk were repeatedly subjected to pillaging, arson, and sexual violence committed by both rebel and royal forces.

==== Dutch society and the Golden Age ====
The upper and middle classes of the Republic, especially in the provinces of Holland, Zeeland and Utrecht, prospered during this time and experienced the so-called Dutch Golden Age. The 17th-century Republic's population achieved a significantly higher average quality of life than other societies in Europe, with high wages and low prices, providing citizens with high purchasing power. However, wealth and health were rather unequally distributed, and when various plagues hit the urban Dutch populations, the differences in hygiene resulted in the lower classes suffering by far the worst illness and the highest death toll. Deadly epidemics could lead to mass panic, including the 1637 tulip mania, as well as waves of religious fervour (with Christian doomsday prophets emerging at times of trouble) and superstition. These times of crises, as well as the fact that the eastern parts of the Republic remained focused on traditional agriculture and relatively poor, challenge the notion of a general 'Dutch Golden Age'. On the other hand, constant immigration of skilled labourers from the Southern Netherlands, Germany and Scandinavia enabled the economy to survive, flourish and grow after every epidemic that raged across the Republic, unlike elsewhere in Europe.

The social stratification in the territories that would coalesce into the Dutch Republic changed radically during the war. In the chaotic early decades of the revolt, there were numerous opportunities for social and political advancement by people from lower classes, especially if they managed to become accomplished merchants. By 1650, social mobility had been severely reduced again, as a new class of merchant aristocracy, known as the regenten, had been formed that almost entirely closed itself off from lower social groups, with a few exceptions. Especially in the province of Holland, these typically urban patricians had managed to take over the positions of power that the old nobility once wielded. The situation in the eastern Netherlands was quite different: the traditional rural nobility still had a more powerful position than the urban regenten.

The territories of Brabant (Staats-Brabant), Flanders (Staats-Vlaanderen), Upper Guelders (Staats-Opper-Gelre), and the Duchy of Limburg and the Lands of Overmaze (Staats-Overmaas) conquered in the last decades of the war were not granted an equal status to the Seven Provinces in the north, but ruled directly by the States-General as Generality Lands. Catholics, who formed the majority in these lands, were tolerated and permitted to practice their religion in private, but all Catholic churches and cloisters were confiscated, it was illegal to hold Catholic religious services in public, and most public offices were reserved for Calvinists. The general population of Staats-Brabant was agricultural and poor, but there were large differences between classes, with rich Brabanders often having families living above the Great Rivers and participating in trade and the Dutch East Indies Company (VOC), even before the war was over. The unequal political status of the Generality Lands, and the legal discrimination against Catholics, would continue for the rest of the Ancien Régime.

=== Commerce ===
Dutch trade on the Iberian Peninsula and the Mediterranean exploded in the decade after the peace, as did trade in general, because trade patterns in all European areas were so tightly interlocked via the hub of the Amsterdam Entrepôt. Dutch trade in this period reached its pinnacle; it came to completely dominate that of competing powers, like England, that had only a few years previously profited greatly from the handicap the Spanish embargoes posed to the Dutch. Now the greater efficiency of Dutch shipping had a chance to be fully translated into shipping prices, and the competitors were left in the dust. The structure of European trade therefore changed fundamentally in a way that was advantageous to Dutch trade, agriculture and industry. One could truly speak of Dutch primacy in world trade. This not only caused a significant boom for the Dutch economy, but also much resentment in neighbouring countries, such as the Commonwealth of England and, later, France. Soon, the Republic was embroiled in military conflicts with these countries, which culminated in their joint attack on the Republic in 1672. They almost succeeded in destroying the Republic in that year, but the Republic rose from its ashes and by the turn of the century, she was one of the two European power centres, together with the France of king Louis XIV.

== Bibliography ==
- Groenveld, Simon (2009). Unie – Bestand – Vrede. Drie fundamentele wetten van de Republiek der Verenigde Nederlanden. Hilversum: Uitgeverij Verloren. p. 200. ISBN 9789087041274. (in cooperation with H.L.Ph. Leeuwenberg and H.B. van der Weel)
- Israel, Jonathan (1989). Dutch Primacy in World Trade, 1585–1740. Clarendon Press. ISBN 0-19-821139-2.
- Israel, Jonathan (1995). The Dutch Republic: Its Rise, Greatness, and Fall 1477–1806. Oxford: Clarendon Press. ISBN 0-19-873072-1.
- Kennedy, James C. (2017). A Concise History of the Netherlands. Cambridge: Cambridge University Press. p. 131. ISBN 9781108364010.
- van der Lem, Anton (1995). "Het verhaal van de Opstand. Hoofdstuk 6: De geregelde oorlog". De Opstand in de Nederlanden (1555–1648) (in Dutch). Uitgeverij Kosmos / Leiden Universityv(dutchrevolt.leiden.edu).
- Mulder, Liek; Doedens, Anne; Kortlever, Yolande (2008). Geschiedenis van Nederland, van prehistorie tot heden. Baarn: HBuitgevers. p. 288. ISBN 9789055746262.
