= The Raising of Lazarus (disambiguation) =

The Raising of Lazarus is a Christian miracle narrative, concerning Lazarus of Bethany.

The Raising of Lazarus may also refer to:

- The Raising of Lazarus (Caravaggio), a painting by Michelangelo Merisi da Caravaggio
- The Raising of Lazarus (Jan Lievens) 1631 painting by Dutch artist Jan Lievens
- The Raising of Lazarus (Sebastiano del Piombo), a painting by Sebastiano del Piombo
- The Raising of Lazarus (Rembrandt), a painting by Rembrandt van Rijn

== See also ==
- Lazarus Rising (disambiguation)
