= Self-Portrait (Lievens) =

Painting by Jan Lievens

- Artist: Jan Lievens
- Year: c. 1629–1630
- Medium: Oil on panel
- Subject: Self-portrait
- Dimensions: 42 cm × 37 cm (17 in × 15 in)
- Location: Leiden Collection

Self-Portrait is an oil painting on panel of c. 1629–1630 by the Dutch artist Jan Lievens. The work is held in a private collection, but was exhibited in Washington, D.C., from 2008 to 2009, and worldwide with the Leiden Collection from 2017 and 2019.

== History ==
Jan Lievens completed the self-portrait around 1629 to 1630 in Leiden. The painting is held in the Leiden Collection. It was first exhibited in 1957 at the Alfred Brod Gallery in London. From October 2008 to January 2009, the painting was on display in an exhibition titled Jan Who? at the National Gallery of Art in Washington, D.C.

== Description ==
The self-portrait depicts Lievens looking away from the viewer. He painted himself with long flowing hair and strong features. Light comes from the upper left to accentuate his cheekbone and show off his skin. He also painted the fine hair of his narrow mustache.

Using dendrochronology, examinations of the painting and panel have revealed that the self-portrait was painted on an oak panel from the same tree as Rembrandt used for his 1629–1630 painting Samson and Delilah. X-radiographs of the self-portrait show that Lievens made "transformative revisions to his appearance" in the portrait several times. He painted over a hat that was tilted on his head, and he changed the head to a position tilting forward. He also changed the hair in the painting, adding flowing locks on the left, possibly to emulate Flemish or English courtly hairstyles.

== Reception ==
Lievens's self-portrait was exhibited at the National Gallery of Art in 2008 and 2009. In the exhibition brochure, titled Jan Lievens: A Dutch Master Rediscovered, American art historian Arthur K. Wheelock Jr. describes the self-portrait as "handsome and assured". He also stated the self-portrait revealed Lievens's "ability to evoke the essence of a person through features alone".
