= Head of a Boy =

Painting by Rembrandt's studio, c. 1643

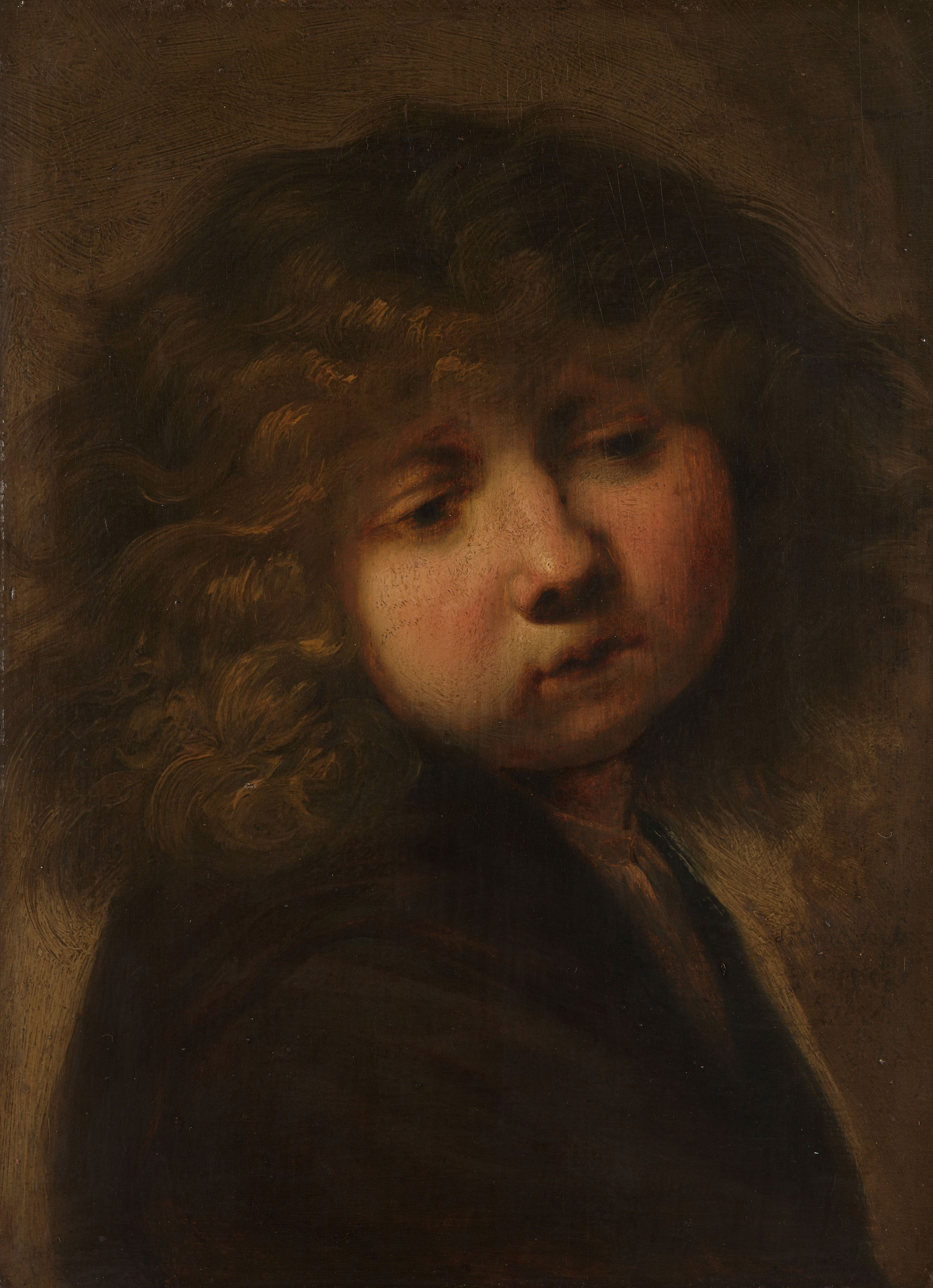

Head of a Boy is a painting of a boy's head, dated to c.1643 or later. It is signed or inscribed ‘Rembrandt / geretuceer [...] / Lieve [...]’, which long led art historians to believe it was a work by Jan Lievens, who worked closely with Rembrandt early in his career. The first to dispute this identification was Rudi Ekkart in 1973, who argued it was instead a product of Rembrandt's studio or of his immediate circle. The panel on which it is painted has been dendrochronologically dated to 1637 at the earliest and (due to possible missing rings) more likely 1643 or later. The work is now in the Rijksmuseum, which it entered in 1909.

== Sources ==
- Jongenskopje, Rembrandt van Rijn (omgeving van), na 1643
