= Lazarus Rising =

Lazarus Rising may refer to:

- Lazarus Rising (novel), a science fiction novel by David Sherman and Dan Cragg
- Lazarus Rising: A Personal and Political Autobiography, an autobiography of John Howard
- "Lazarus Rising" (Supernatural), an episode of Supernatural

== See also ==
- The Raising of Lazarus (disambiguation)
