= Bearded Man with a Beret =

1630 painting by Jan Lievens

- Dutch: Bebaarde man met een baret
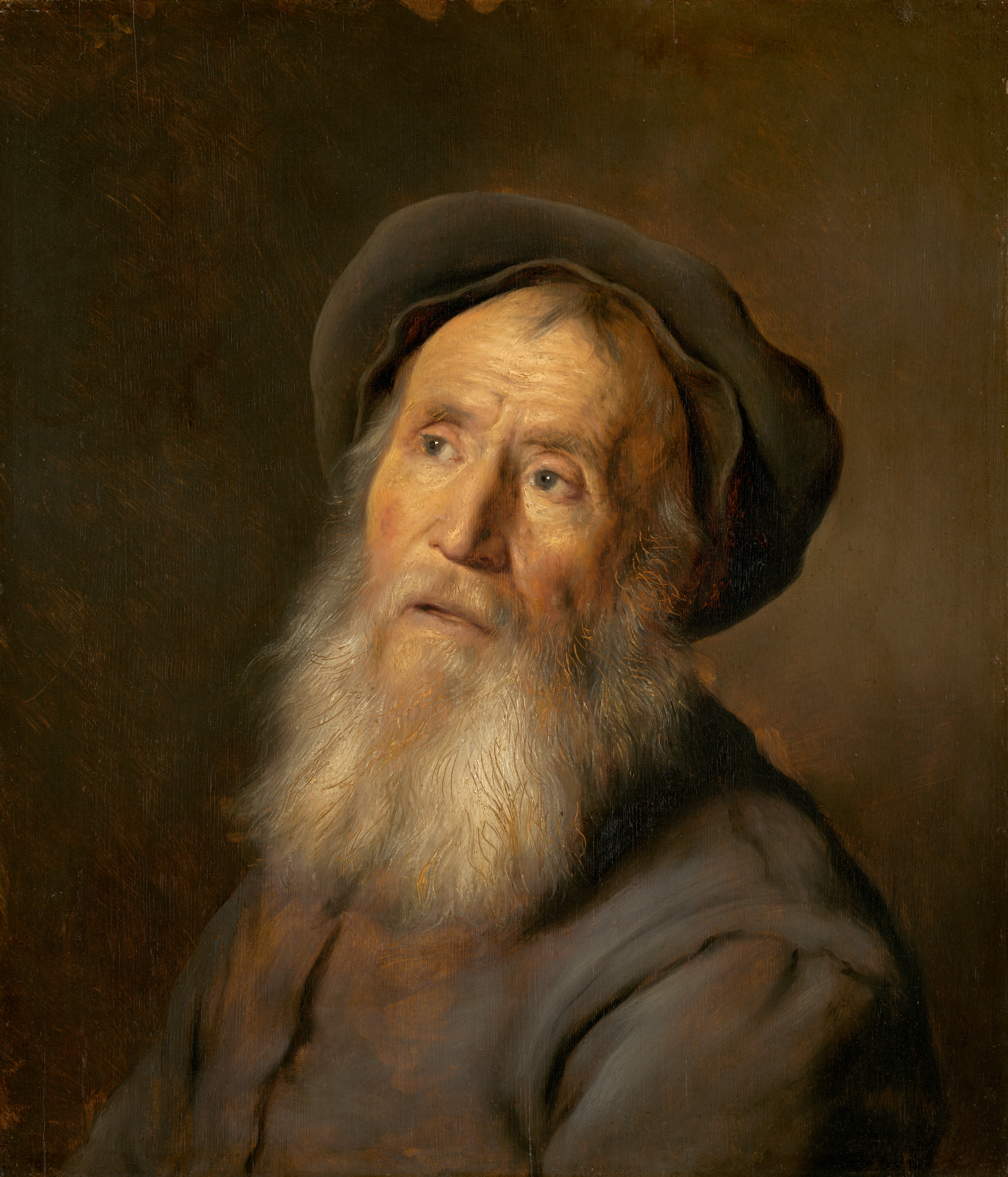
- Artist: Jan Lievens
- Year: 1630
- Medium: Oil-on-panel
- Movement: Realism (arts)
- Subject: Tronie
- Dimensions: 53.5 cm (21.1 in) × 46.3 cm (18.2 in)
- Location: National Gallery of Art, Washington, D.C.

Bearded Man with a Beret is a 1630 painting by the Dutch artist Jan Lievens. The painting of an old man is considered to be a stock character or a tronie. It is now in the National Gallery of Art in Washington D.C.

== History ==
The portrait was completed by Jan Lievens in 1630, and the subject of the painting is considered to be a tronie. Lievens was said to be adept at portraying old men with emotional eyes. It was painted while Lievens was working with Rembrandt in Leiden.

In 1990-1991 the painting was exhibited at the Fine Arts Museums of San Francisco. In 2008 the painting was exhibited at the Milwaukee Art Museum and the National Gallery of Art in Washington, D.C. In 2008-2009 it was exhibited at the Museum Het Rembrandthuis. In 2010 the painting was given to the National Gallery of Art by Linda Kaufman and George M. Kaufman.

== Description ==
Bearded Man with a Beret is a 1630 oil-on-panel painting by the Dutch artist Jan Lievens. Its dimensions are 53.5 cm × 46.3 cm (21.1 in × 18.2 in). The painting is of an old man who is looking up to his right. His lips are parted as if he has been interrupted while speaking. The beret on the old man's head may indicate the person is a scholar or an artist.

== Reception ==
Art historian Arthur K. Wheelock Jr. described the painting as a picture of an old man with light caressing his face, revealing wrinkled skin. The man has a furrowed brow and glinting off of his eyes. It was created during a time when Lievens etched numerous tronies (1620s and early 1630s). He said Lievens "indicated the transparency of the elderly man's skin with thin glazing, while suggesting the roughness of its texture by applying thick impastos with quick strokes of the brush".
