= The Raising of Lazarus (Lievens) =

1631 painting by Jan Lievens

- De opwekking van Lazarus (Dutch)
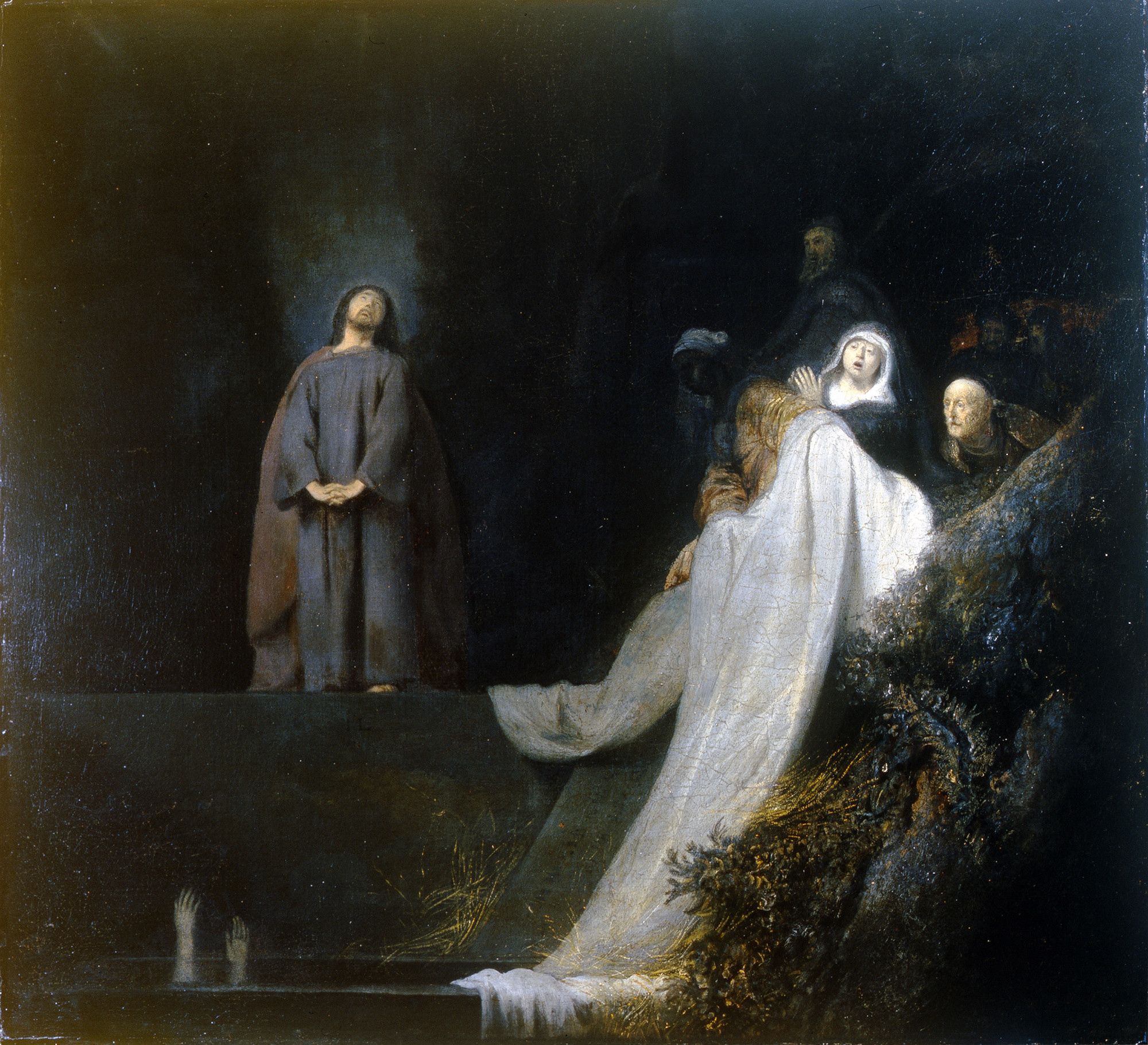
- The Raising of Lazarus
- Artist: Jan Lievens
- Year: 1631
- Medium: Oil on canvas
- Movement: Religious art
- Subject: Rising from the dead
- Dimensions: 107 cm (42 in) × 114.3 cm (45.0 in)
- Location: Brighton Museum & Art Gallery, Brighton and Hove

The Raising of Lazarus is an oil-on-canvas painting of 1631 by the Dutch artist Jan Lievens. The painting shows Jesus Christ raising Lazarus of Bethany from the dead. Its dimensions are 107 cm (42 in) × 114.3 cm (45.0 in).

First acquired by Lievens' associate Rembrandt, it was donated to the Brighton Museum & Art Gallery in 1903.

== History ==
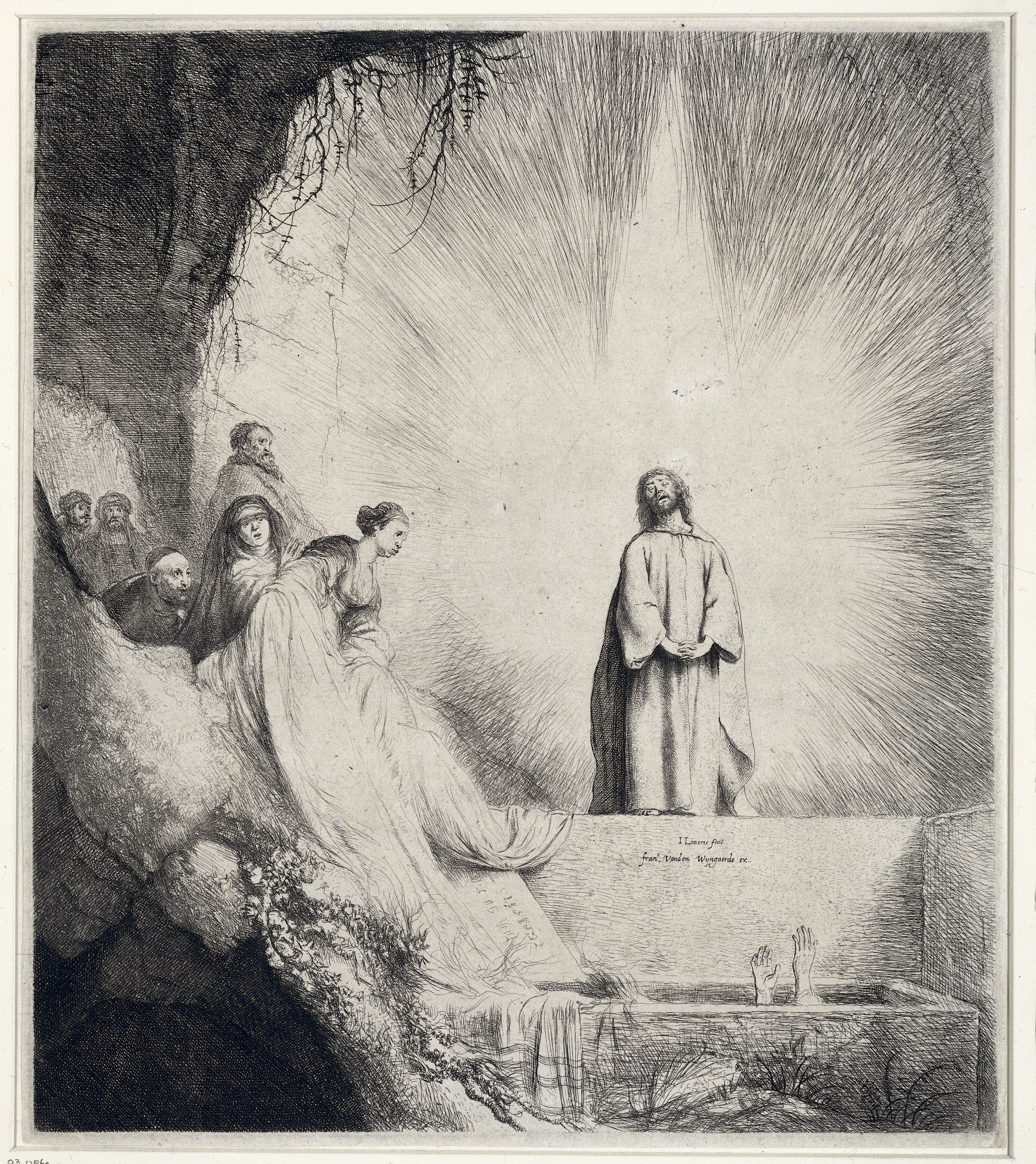
Lievens' etching of the subject, with the composition reversed.

Lievens painted The Raising of Lazarus in 1631. Over 1630–1632 he had a contest with Rembrandt to produce the best composition depicting "The Raising of Lazarus". The Lievens' painting is done primarily in shades of grey, and it is a night scene. Lievens also produced an etching based on the painting.

In 1871 the painting was included in the Old Masters Exhibition at the Royal Academy of Arts. In 1884, the painting and an etching were sold for 12 guineas. In 1903, Henry Willett donated the painting to the Brighton Museum & Art Gallery.

== Description ==
In the painting, Lievens portrays the fabrics as shimmering with gold and brown hues. The subject matter of the painting is Lazarus rising from his tomb like a ghost figure. Jesus Christ stands on a raised surface with his hands clasped. He looks skyward into a beam of light. In the grave beneath Jesus, the two hands of Lazarus reach out of the grave. A woman resembling a nun at the grave's edge has a stunned look on her face. Other people are observing the scene, including a black woman holding a large white shroud.

== Reception ==
Writing for The New York Times in 2008, art critic Ken Johnson said the painting was "An unusually austere composition, it has a simplicity and openness that enhance its mystery." He also stated that Rembrandt enjoyed the painting so much that he acquired it and hung it in his home. When Rembrandt fell on hard times later in his life, he sold Jan Lievens' version of The Raising of Lazarus.

Writing for Smithsonian magazine, Matthew Gurewitsch describes the painting as "a gothic scene in a somber palette and with the utmost restraint". He goes on to say that Lievens does not portray Jesus with grand gestures and he portrays Lazarus only as two hands reaching out of a tomb. He uses pale light to permeate the darkness and express "intimations of spirituality".

An image of the painting appears in the 2022 Michael Grandage film My Policeman, starring Harry Styles, David Dawson, and Emma Corrin. The three main characters, Tom, Patrick, and Marion, who are in a complex love triangle, visit the Brighton Museum & Art Gallery and admire the painting. The character of Marion, who is Tom's girlfriend, calls the painting "astonishing" and Patrick, who is secretly Tom's lover, agrees.
