= Samson and Delilah (Rembrandt) =

Painting by Rembrandt

Samson betrayed by Delilah
- Samson and Delilah
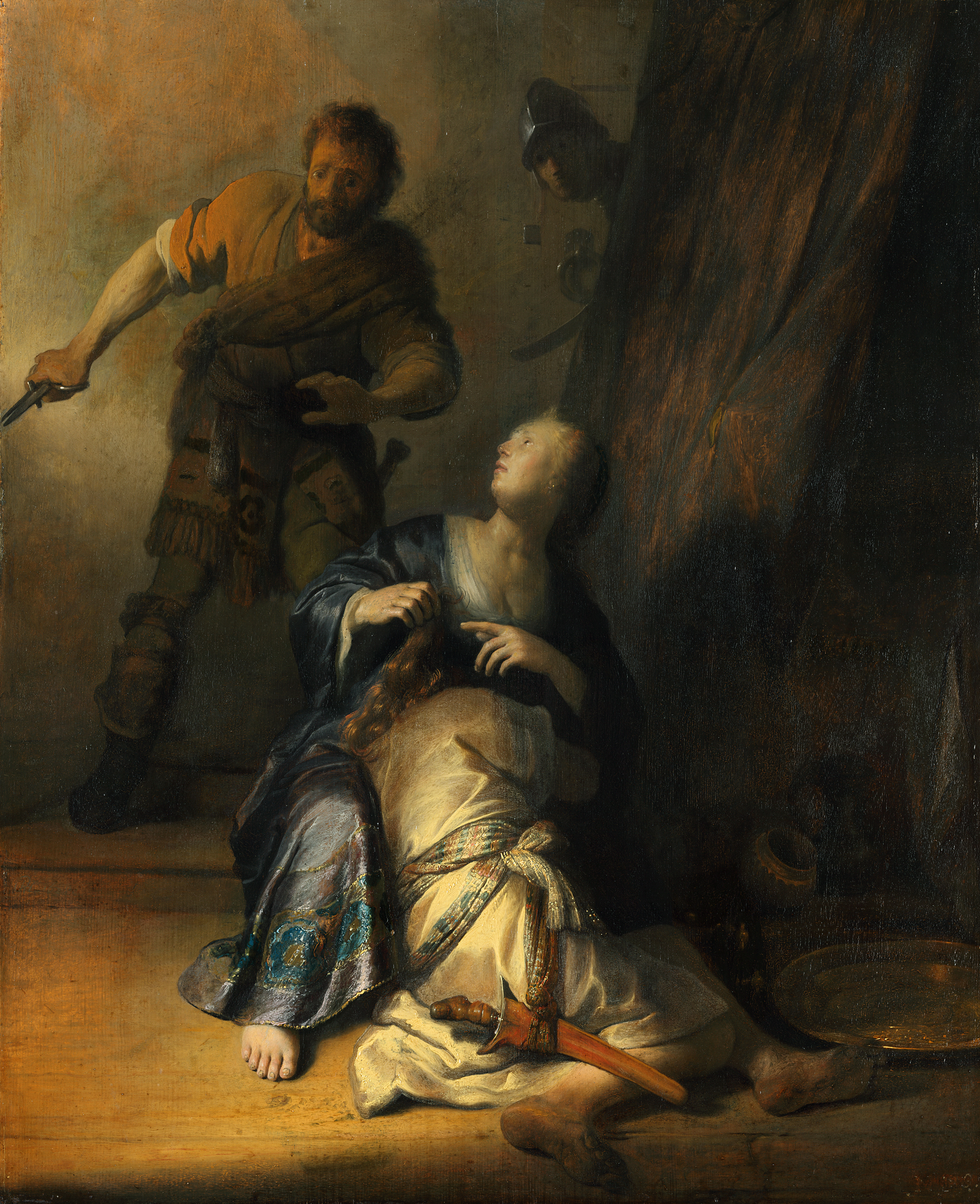
- Year: 1629–1630
- Medium: oil paint, panel
- Dimensions: 61.3, 61.4 cm (24.1, 24.2 in) × 50.1 cm (19.7 in)
- Location: Gemäldegalerie

Samson and Delilah is a 1629–1630 painting by Rembrandt, now in the Gemäldegalerie, Berlin. It is first recorded in Frederick Henry of Orange's collection in the Hague in 1632 and passed down through the family until Huis Honselaarsdijk and its contents were bequeathed to Frederick I of Prussia on the death of William III of Orange. Frederick's son Frederick the Great probably moved the painting to Berlin in 1742. In 1793 it was mentioned as a work by Govert Flinck in the inventory of the Berlin Palace, and it remained there until moving to its present home in 1906.

== See also ==
- List of paintings by Rembrandt

== Sources ==
- Simson und Delila, Marburg Picture Index (Bildindex der Kunst und Architektur, German)
