= Allegory of Peace =

1652 painting by Jan Lievens

- Dutch: Allegorie op de vrede
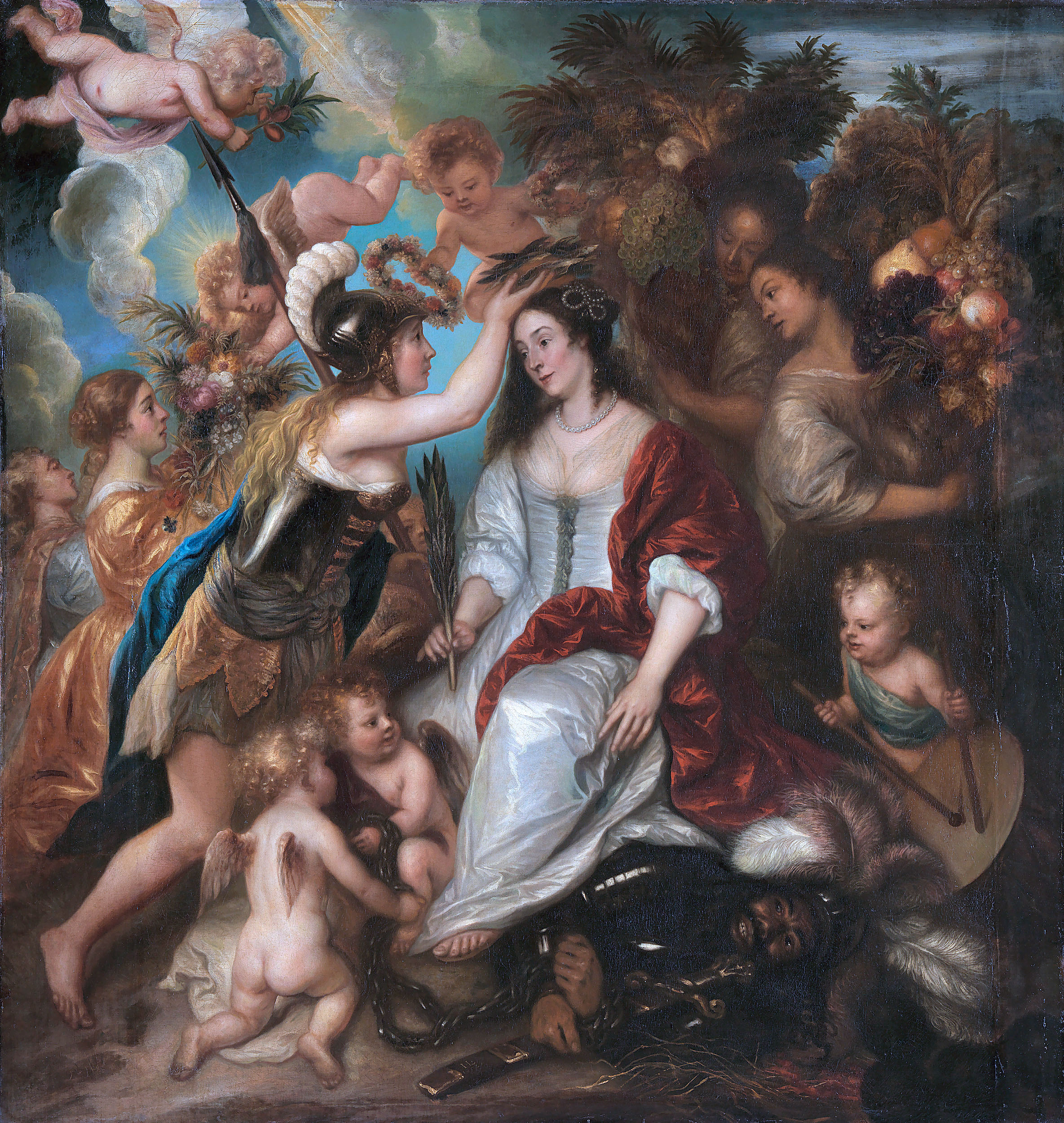
- Allegory of Peace
- Artist: Jan Lievens
- Year: 1652
- Medium: Oil-on-canvas
- Subject: Peace
- Dimensions: 217 cm (85 in) × 211 cm (83 in)
- Weight: 44 kg (97 lb)
- Location: Rijksmuseum, Amsterdam

Allegory of Peace or Triumph of Peace is a 1652 oil-on-canvas painting by Dutch artist Jan Lievens. The painting represents the 1648 Treaty of Münster and depicts Minerva, the goddess of wisdom, crowning Pax, the goddess of peace.

== History ==
Allegory of Peace is a painting by Jan Lievens, completed in 1652. The painting is in the Rijksmuseum in Amsterdam. It is an allegorical celebration of the Treaty of Münster. The 1648 treaty ended decades of conflict between Spain and the Netherlands.

== Description ==
The work is a 217 cm (85 in) × 211 cm (83 in) oil-on-canvas painting and weighs 44 kg (97 lb). The painting shows a seated female who represents peace being crowned with a laurel wreath by a woman who is clad in armour who represents war. Under her feet lies a man in armor with a sword, his hands wrapped in chains. On her left, women have baskets of fruit and a putto is playing a drum. On her right two other putti put chains on the man's feet. Also on her right are more putti and women with flowers. The painting depicts Minerva, the Roman goddess of wisdom, crowning Pax, the goddess of peace, who holds an olive branch. The man in chains under the feet of Pax is Mars, the god of war.

== Reception ==
Author David Charles Preyer stated that the composition of the painting is "awkward" and that Peace "squints dreadfully" but that the beauty of the small angels help to redeem the painting. The National Gallery of Art, in Washington D.C., states that the painting has complex iconography. Art critic Ken Johnson writing for The New York Times said it "falls far short of the kind of dynamism that Rubens could bring to such mythological symbolism" and calls it a "big, sugary allegory" with winged putti fluttering about.
