= Jan Lievens =

Dutch painter (1607–1674)

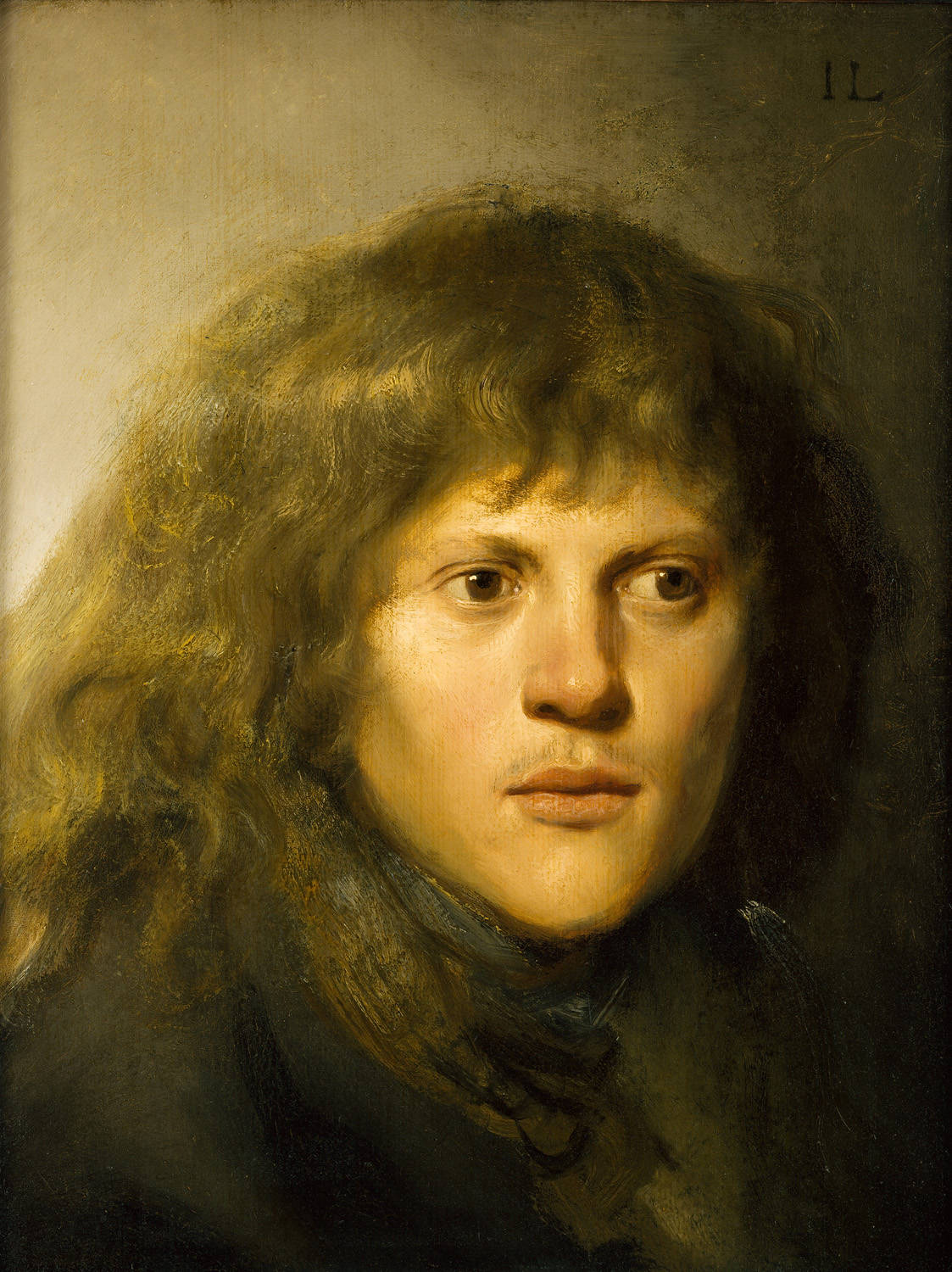
- Self portrait
- Born: Jan Lievens; 24 October 1607; Leiden, Dutch Republic
- Died: 4 June 1674 (aged 66); Amsterdam, Dutch Republic
- Education: Pieter Lastman
- Known for: Portrait painting

Jan Lievens (24 October 1607 – 4 June 1674) was a Dutch Golden Age painter who was associated with his close contemporary Rembrandt, a year older, in the early parts of their careers. They shared a birthplace in Leiden, training with Pieter Lastman in Amsterdam, where they shared a studio for about five years until 1631. Like Rembrandt he painted both portraits and history paintings, but unlike him Lievens' career took him away from Amsterdam to London, Antwerp, The Hague and Berlin.

== Biography ==
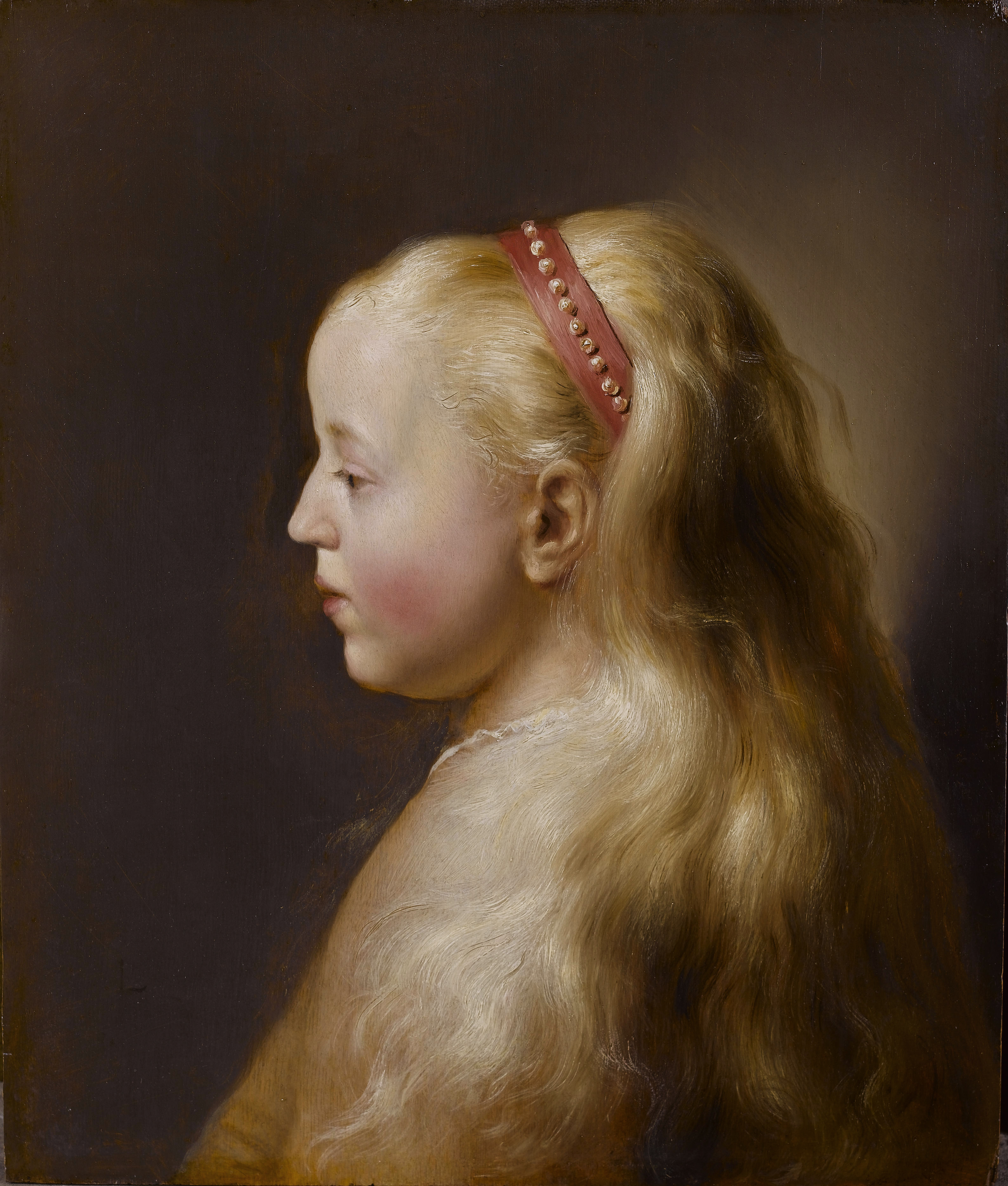
A young girl

According to Arnold Houbraken, Jan was the son of Lieven Hendriksze, an embroiderer (borduurwerker), and was trained by Joris Verschoten. He was sent to Pieter Lastman in Amsterdam at about the age of 10 for two full years. After that he began his career as an independent artist, at about the age of 12 in Leiden. He became something of a celebrity because of his talent at such a young age. Specifically, his copy of Democriet & Herakliet by Cornelis van Haarlem (illustration), and a portrait of his mother Machtelt Jans van Noortzant, were admired. This attracted the attention of Maurice of Nassau, Prince of Orange, around 1620, who bought a life-size painting of a young man reading by the light of a turf-fire. He gave this painting in turn to the English Ambassador, who presented it to James I. This was the reason why in 1631, when Lievens was 24, he was invited to the British court. Houbraken appears to have taken this account directly from Jan Orlers' Beschrijvinge der Stad Leyden (1641) which gives a life of Jan Lievens in pages 375-7 including these details. However a painting by Lievens in the Getty Museum of Prince Charles Louis and his Tutor which must have been painted in Leiden is clearly signed and dated 1631, so the exact timing of his trip to England is open to doubt.

When he returned from England via Calais, he settled in Antwerp, where he married Suzanna Colyn de Nole, the daughter of the sculptor Michiel Colyns, on 23 December 1638. In this period he won many commissions from royalty, mayors, and city halls. According to Houbraken, a Continence of Scipio was painted for the Leiden city hall. A poem by Joost van den Vondel was written in honor of a painting (a schoorsteenstuk, or over the mantel piece) he made for the mayor's office of the Amsterdam city hall (now the Royal Palace of Amsterdam) in 1661. According to the Amsterdams Historisch Museum, this piece survives and depicts Brinno raised on a shield with the Cananefates, after a similar painting by Otto van Veen in 1613.

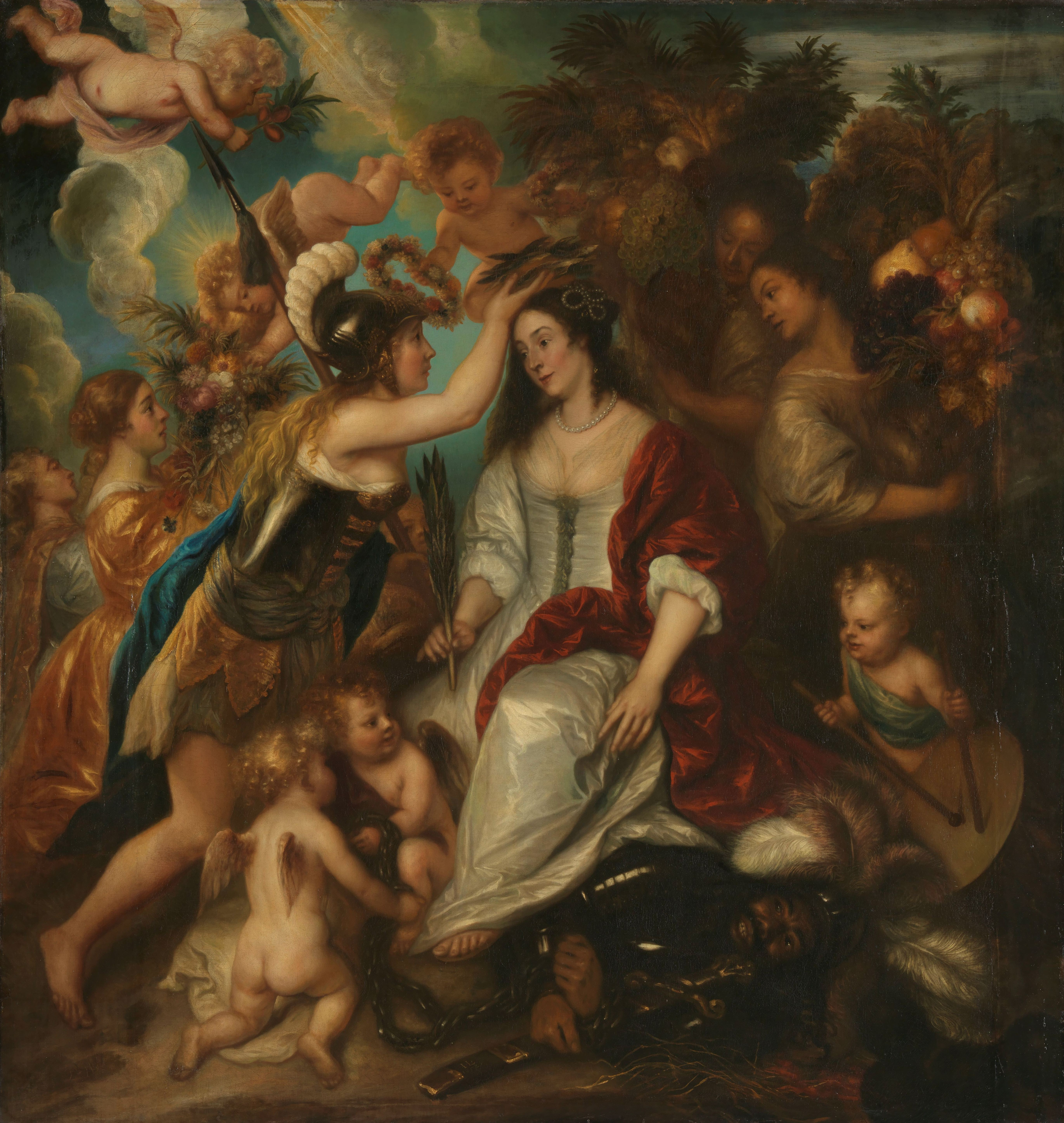
Jan Lievens's painting of Allegory of Peace. The sitting female allegory of Peace is being crowned by a woman in armor, while trampling the allegory of War under her feet. 1654

Lievens collaborated and shared a studio with Rembrandt van Rijn in Leiden from about 1626 to 1631. Their competitive collaboration, represented in some two dozen paintings, drawings and etchings, was intimate enough to cause difficulties in the attribution of works from this period. Lievens showed talent for painting in a life-size scale, and his dramatic compositions suggest the influence of the Caravaggisti. In Constantijn Huygens' assessment, Lievens was more inventive, yet less expressive than Rembrandt. The two men split in 1631, when Rembrandt moved to Amsterdam and Lievens to England. In 1656 Rembrandt still owned paintings by his former friend.

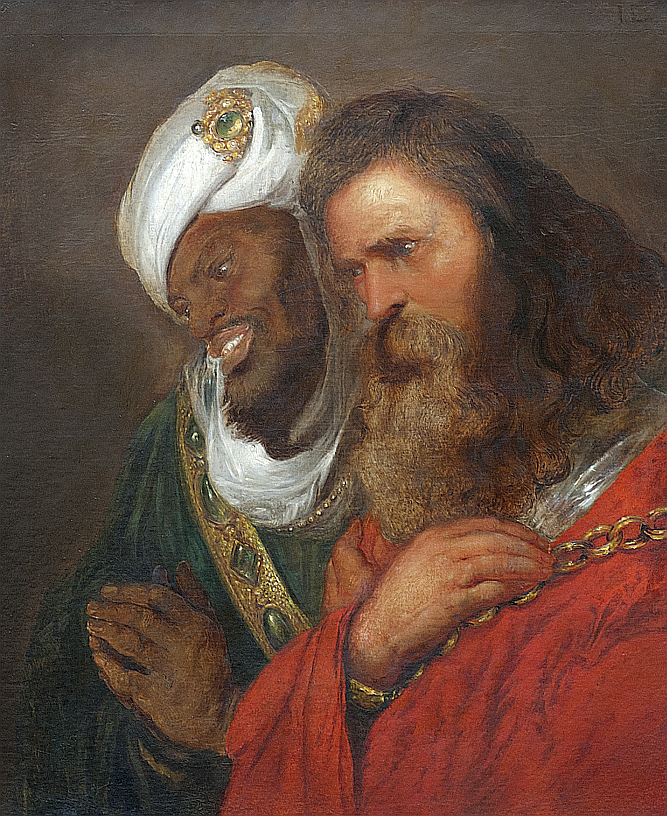
Jan Lievens' painting of King Saladin Holding King Guy de Lusignan captive. As an example of cross-influence by masters of their time, this artpiece by Jan Lievens depicts a fragment of the Adoration of the Magi by Peter Paul Rubens in a totally different setting. 1625

During his time in England Lievens painted a portrait for Thomas Howard, 21st Earl of Arundel, and became influenced by the works of Anthony van Dyck. Lievens worked in Antwerp, and cooperated with Adriaen Brouwer. After being a court painter in The Hague and Berlin, he returned to Amsterdam in 1655. After his first wife died he married a sister of Jan de Bray in 1648. After 1672, the "Rampjaar," Lievens had increasing financial difficulties and his family voided all claims of inheritance on his death due to his debts.

=== Posthumous ===
In 2022, a long-lost missing drawing by Lievens (last seen at auction in Frankfurt in 1888) was rediscovered and auctioned by Christopher Bishop Fine Art for €1.35 million at TEFAF Maastricht.

== Public collections ==
- Agnes Etherington Art Centre
- Amsterdam Museum
- Mauritshuis, The Hague
- Museo Thyssen-Bornemisza, Madrid
- Museum de Fundatie, Zwolle
- Museum der bildenden Künste, Leipzig https://mdbk.de
- Rijksmuseum Amsterdam
- The Walters Art Museum, Maryland
- Utah Museum of Fine Arts
- A portrait of Virgil attributed to Lievens, Raclin Murphy Museum of Art at Notre Dame University
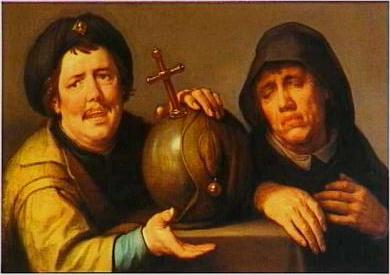
Democriet and Herakliet by Cornelis van Haarlem, which Lievens copied at 12. (The copy is lost)

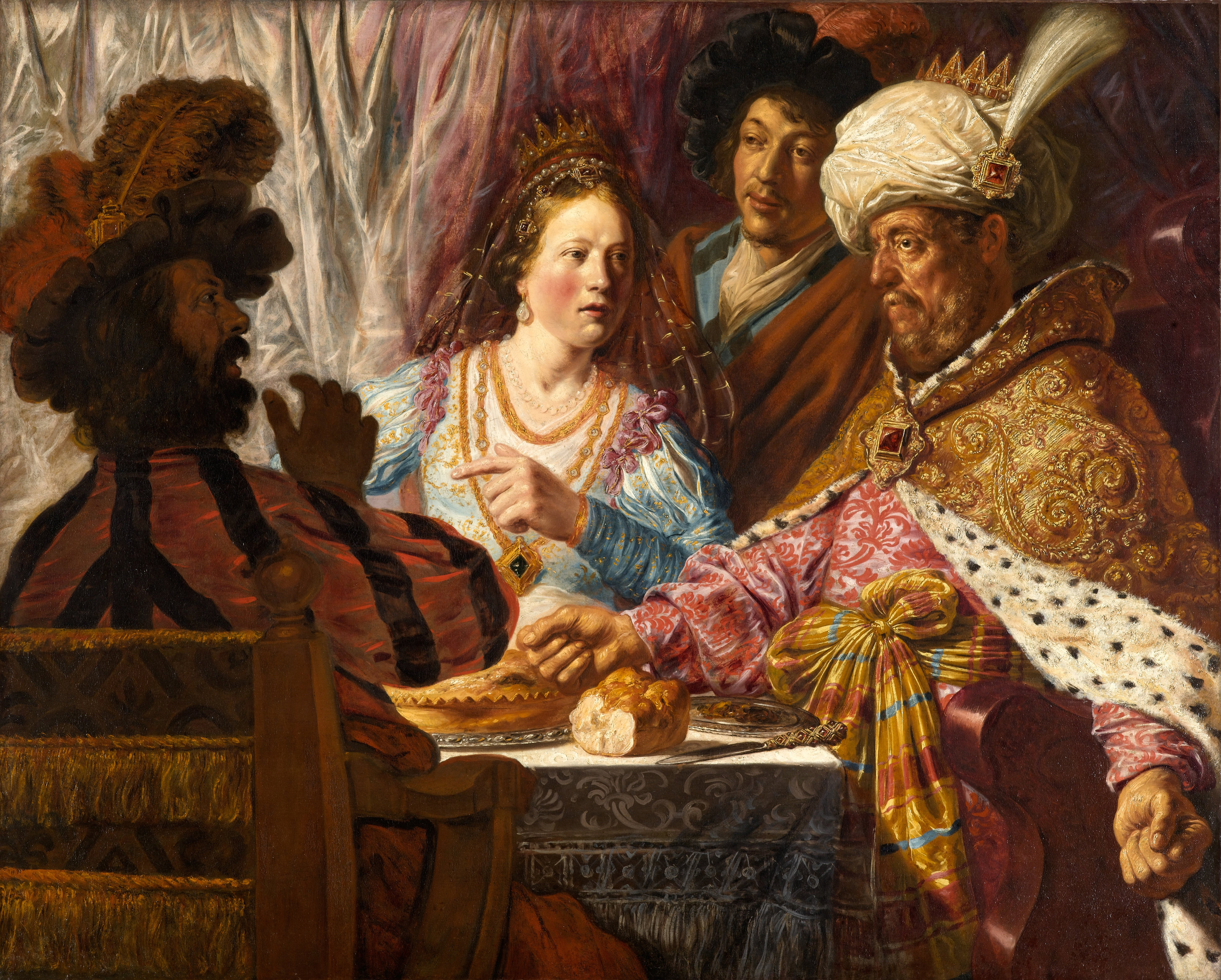
The Feast of Esther, North Carolina Museum of Art.

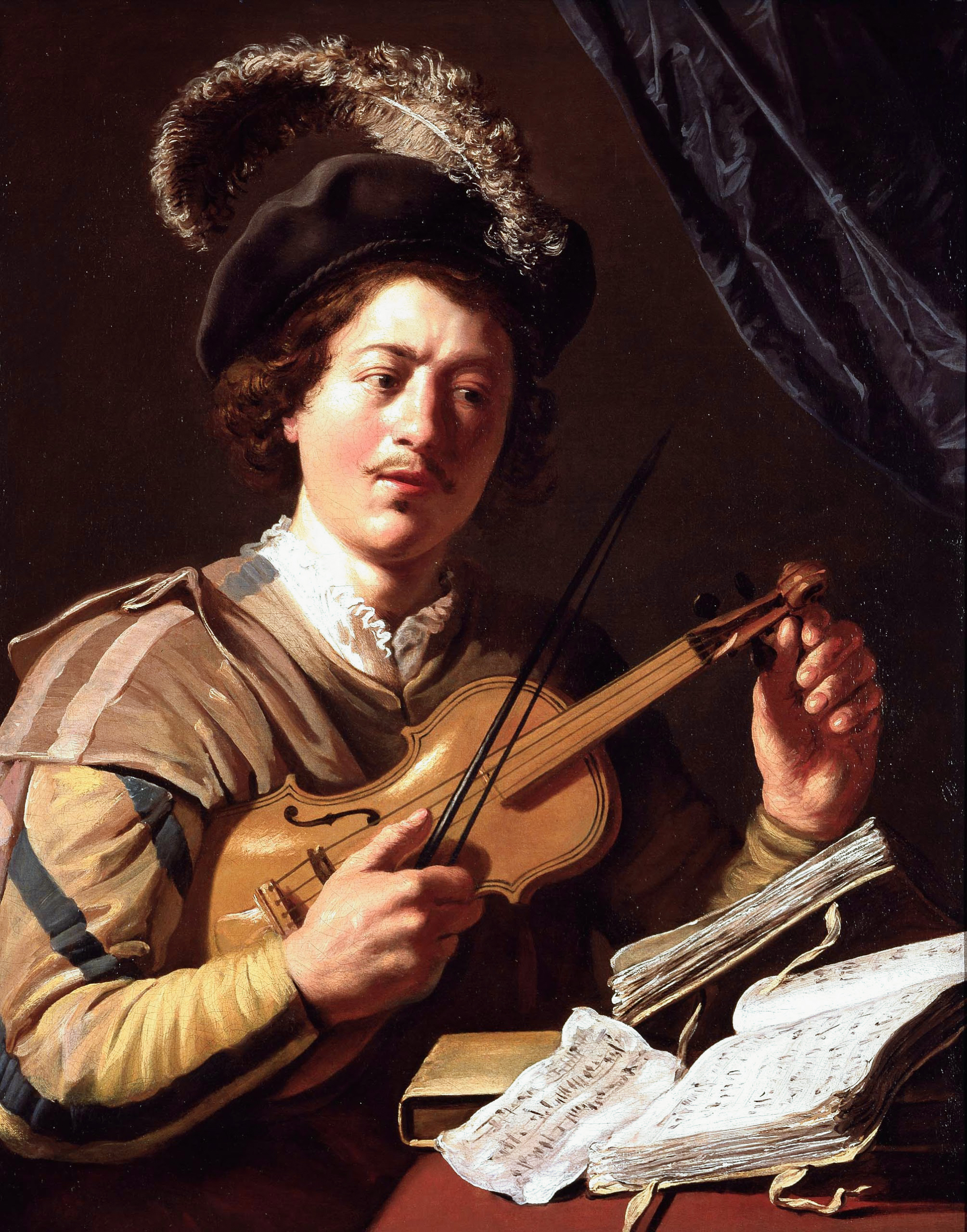
The Violin Player

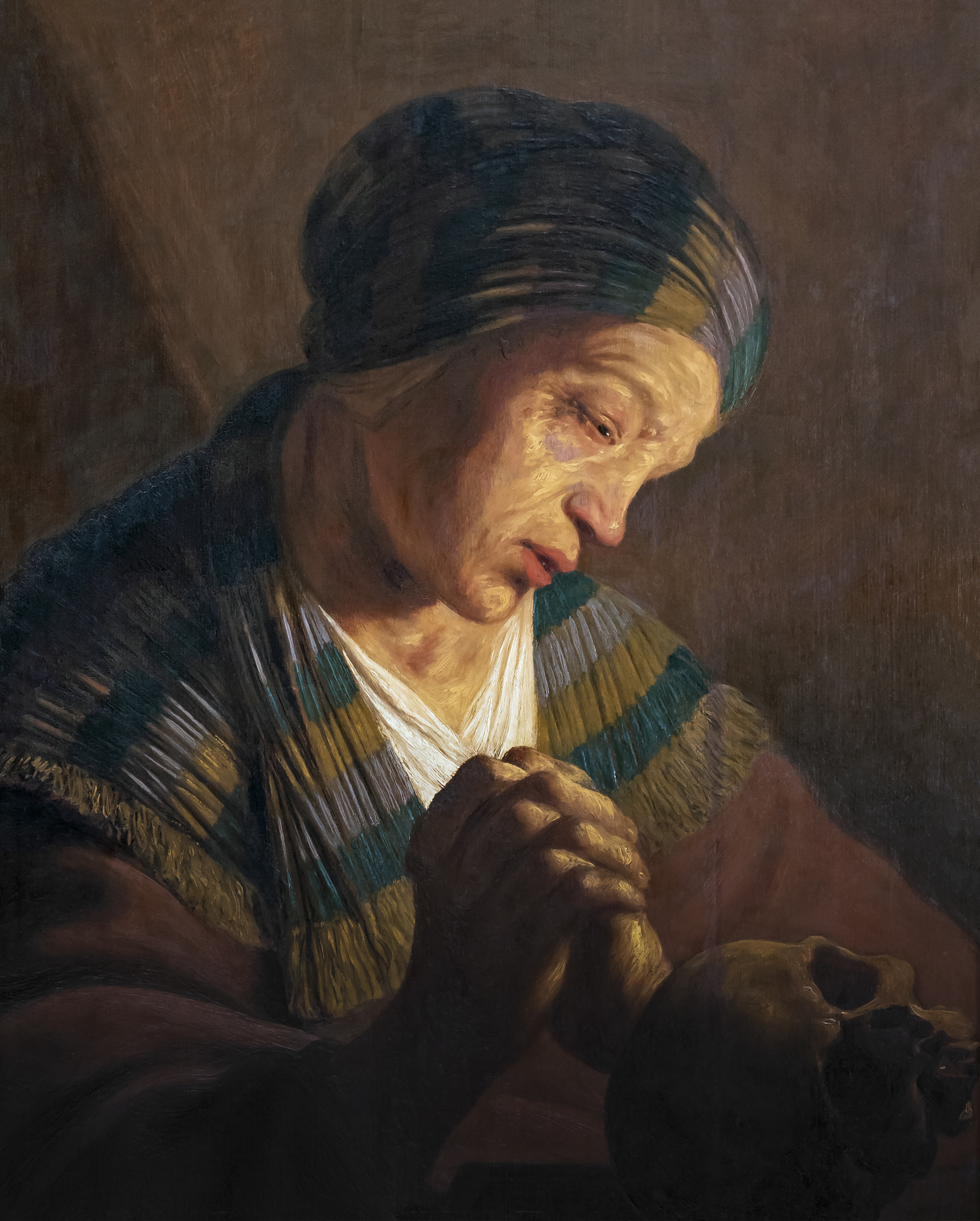
Magdalena in meditation Musée de la Chartreuse de Douai

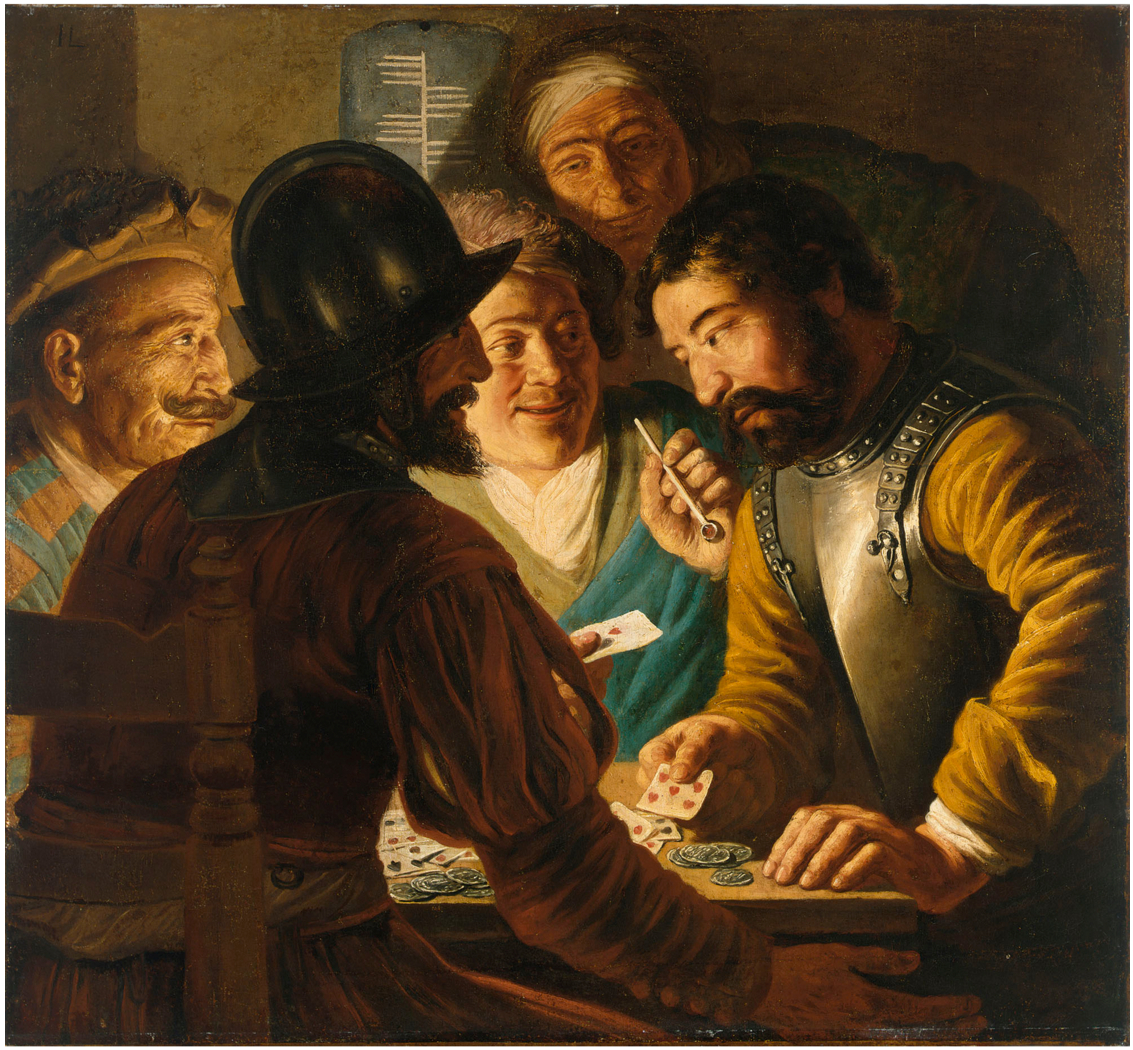
The Card Players (c. 1623-1624)

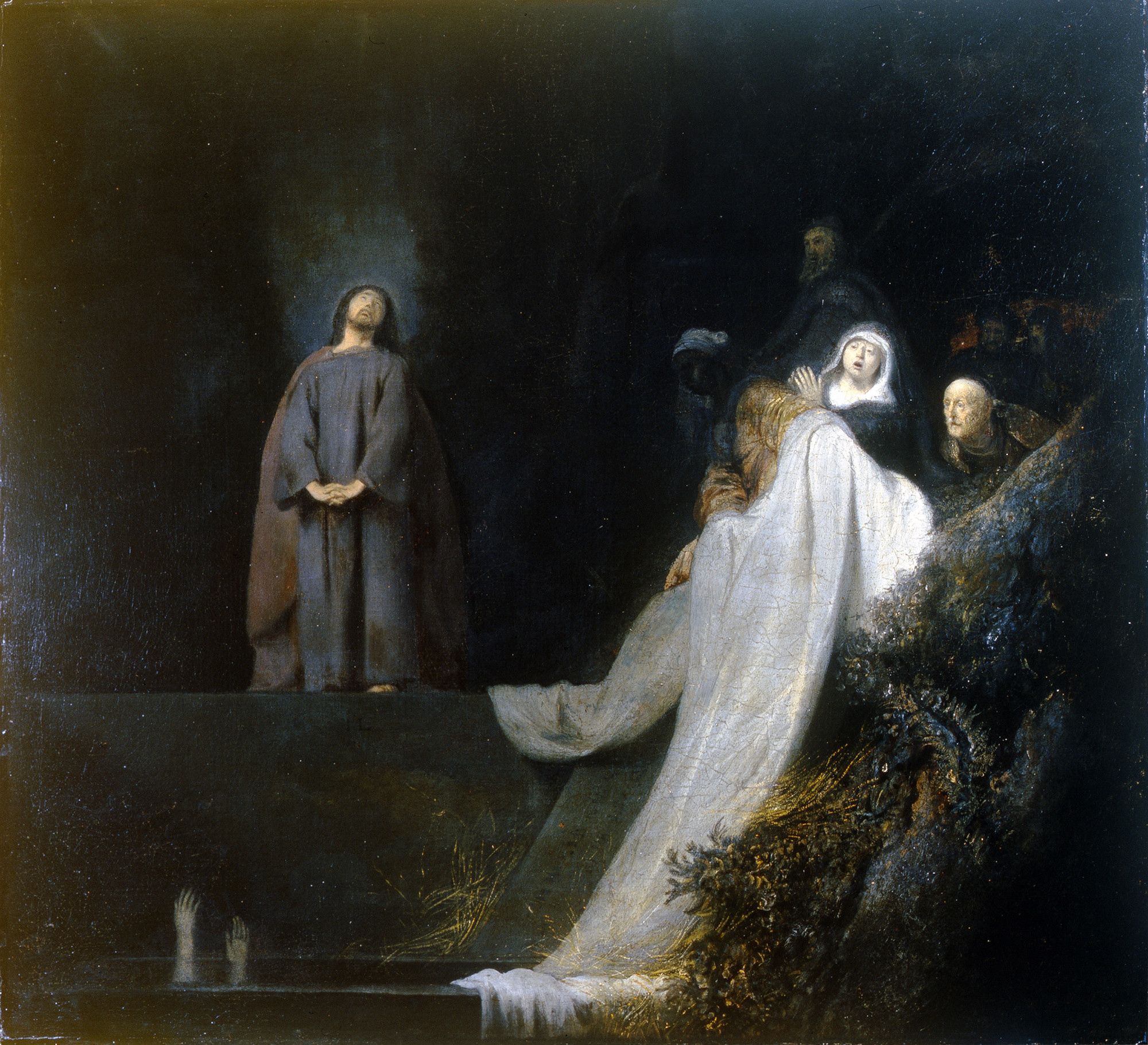
The Raising of Lazarus 1631

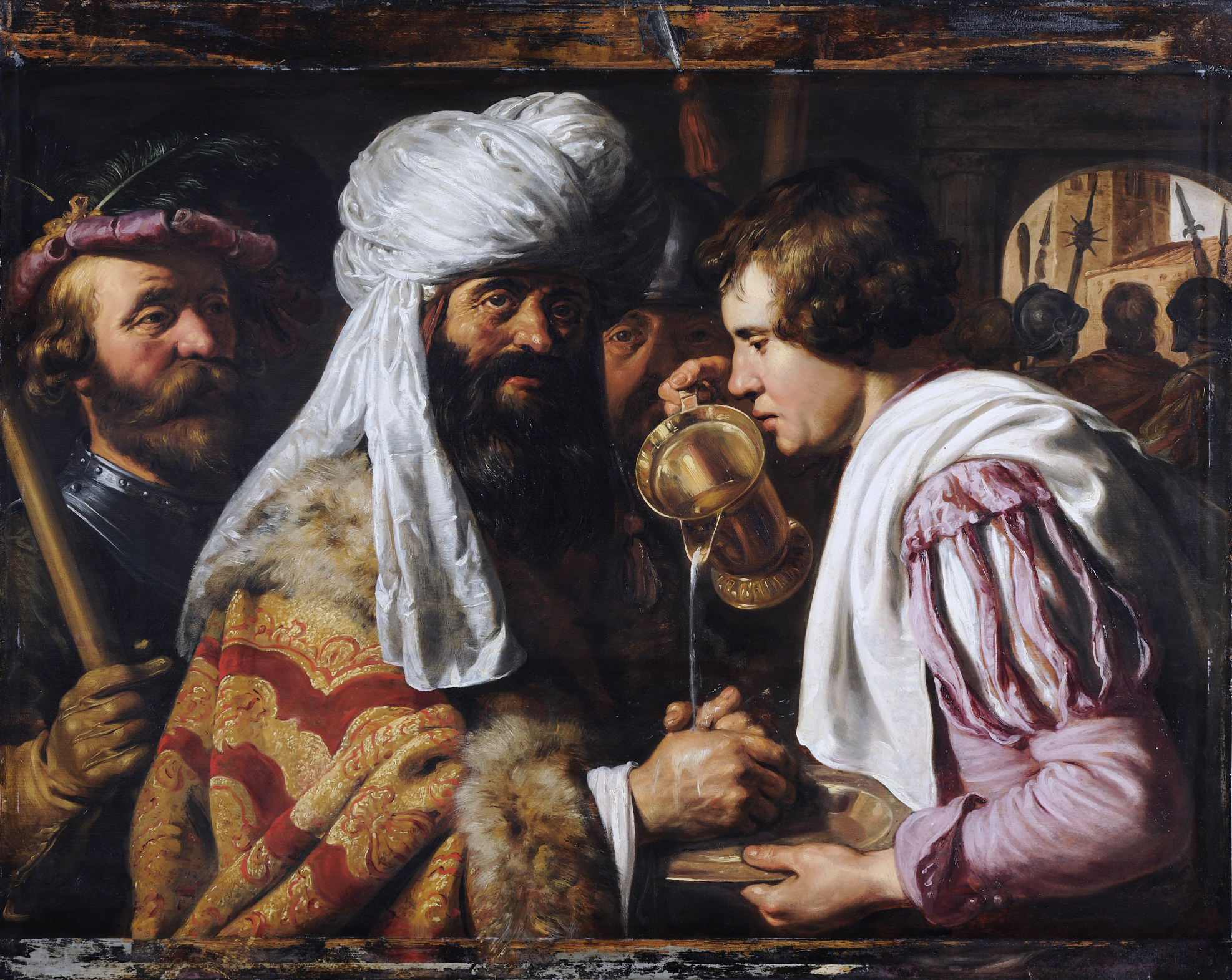

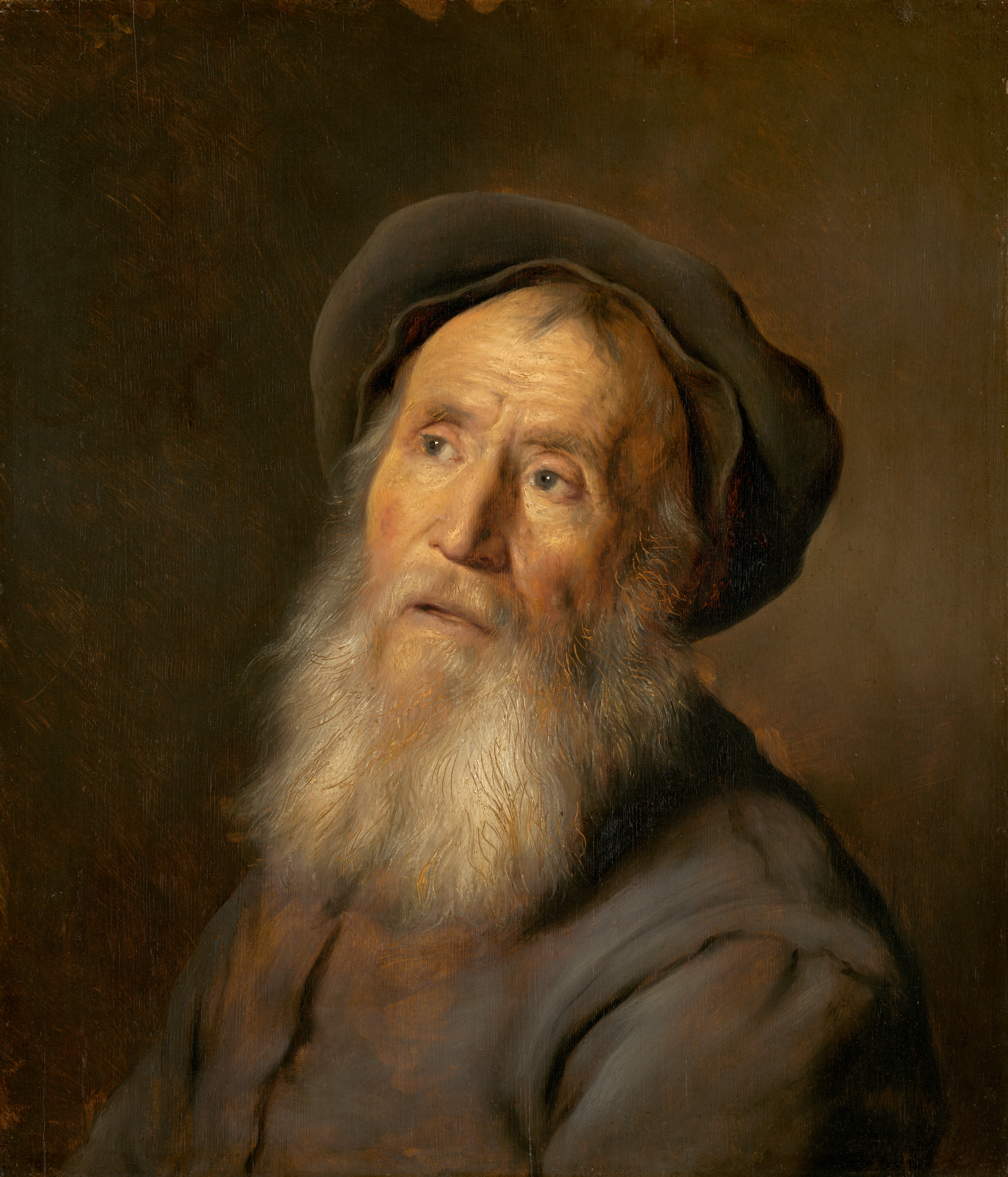
Bearded Man with a Beret (1631)

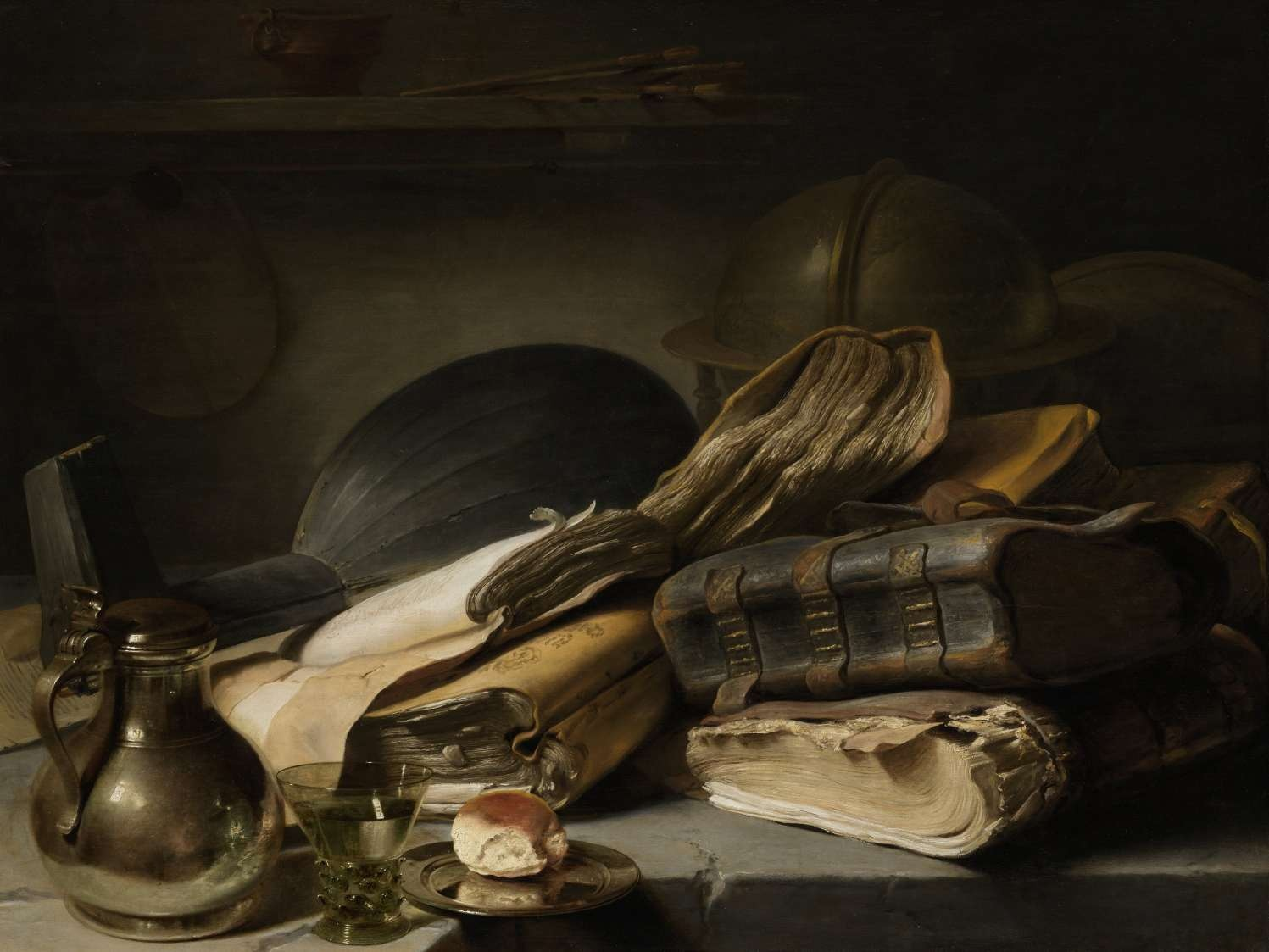
Still Life with Books
