= Still life paintings from the Netherlands, 1550–1720 =

1999 art exhibition catalog

Still Life Paintings from the Netherlands 1550–1720, (Dutch:Het Nederlandse Stilleven 1550–1720) is a 1999 art exhibition catalog published for a jointly held exhibition by the Rijksmuseum Amsterdam (19 June – 9 September 1999) and Cleveland Museum of Art (31 October 1999 – 9 January 2000). The catalog included detailed discussions of 80 paintings from various collection holders, that together give an overview of the best genres in Dutch still-life paintings, namely kitchen piece (keukenstuk), fruit still-life, (fruitstuk), floral still-life (blommetje), breakfast piece (ontbijtje), vanitas, hunting piece (jaagstuk), and show piece (pronkstilleven). The catalog was organized by type, but also loosely by time period, starting with the earliest works.

Image	Article	Creator	Date	Collection	Inventory number	Catalog code
	A Meat Stall with the Holy Family Giving Alms	Pieter Aertsen	1551	North Carolina Museum of Art		1
	Kitchen scene with Christ at Emmaus	Joachim Beuckelaer	circa 1560	Mauritshuis	965	2
	Chinese porcelain vase of flowers on a tabletop	Jan Brueghel the Elder	1609	Kunsthistorisches Museum	GG 558	3
	Garland of Flowers around an Allegory of Farming	Jan Brueghel the Elder	1615	Mauritshuis	233	4
	Flowers in a Glass	Ambrosius Bosschaert	1606	Cleveland Museum of Art	1960.108	5
	Flowers in a Glass in a Niche	Roelant Savery	1611	private collection		6
	Still Life with Flowers in a Vase	Christoffel van den Berghe	1617	Philadelphia Museum of Art	Cat. 648	7
	Dishes with Oysters, Fruit, and Wine	Osias Beert	1615	National Gallery of Art	1995.32.1	8
	Still life with cheese, bread and drinking vessels	Clara Peeters	1615	Mauritshuis	1203	9
	Still Life with Cheese	Floris van Dyck	circa 1615	Rijksmuseum	SK-A-4821	10
	Emblematic Still Life with Flagon, Glass, Jug and Bridle	Johannes van der Beeck	1614	Rijksmuseum	SK-A-2813	11
	The cabinet of a collector with paintings, shells, coins, fossils and flowers	Frans Francken the Younger	1619	Royal Museum of Fine Arts Antwerp (KMSKA)	816	12
	Still Life with Dead Game, Fruits, and Vegetables in a Market	Frans Snyders	1614	Art Institute of Chicago	1981.182	13
	Game and fruit on a table	Frans Snyders	1625	private collection		14
	Still Life with a Skull and a Writing Quill	Pieter Claesz	1628	Metropolitan Museum of Art	49.107	15
	Open book, Skull, Violin and Oil Lamp	Pieter Claesz	1629	private collection		16
	Breakfast Piece	Pieter Claesz	1636	Museum Boijmans Van Beuningen	1122 (OK)	17
	Still Life with Books	Jan Lievens	1630	Rijksmuseum	SK-A-4090	18
	Travel Pouch and Documents on a Table	Paulus Bor	1630	private collection		19
	Pewter Jug and Silver Tazza on a Table	Jan Jansz den Uyl	1633	private collection		20
	Laid Table with Ham and a Roll	Willem Claeszoon Heda	1635	Cleveland Museum of Art		21
	Nautilus Cup, Tazza, and Plates of Oysters	Willem Claeszoon Heda	1649	Staatliches Museum Schwerin		22
	Still Life with Flowers, Shells, and Insects	Balthasar van der Ast	circa 1635	private collection		23
	Floral Still Life	Hans Bollongier	1639	Rijksmuseum	SK-A-799	24
	Flowers in a Vase	Daniel Seghers	1630s	Neue Residenz Bamberg; Bavarian State Painting Collections	5963	25
	Flower garland with Saint Catherine	Daniel Seghers	1650	Royal Museum of Fine Arts Antwerp (KMSKA)	331	26
	Books and Pamphlets	Jan Davidsz. de Heem	1628	Fondation Custodia		27
	Still Life with Books	Jan Davidsz. de Heem	1627	Rijksmuseum	SK-A-2565	28
	Nautilus Cup with Silver Vessels	Jan Davidsz. de Heem	1632	Barber Institute of Fine Arts		29
	Fruit and Ham on a Table with a View of a City	Jan Davidsz. de Heem	1646	Toledo Museum of Art		30
	Still Life of Fruit and Dead Fowl	Harmen Steenwijck	1650	Private collection		31
	Abundant Still Life with a Parrot	Jan Davidsz. de Heem	1655	Academy of Fine Arts Vienna		32
	A Richly Laid Table with Parrots	Jan Davidsz. de Heem	1655	John and Mable Ringling Museum of Art		33
	A Vase of Flowers	Jan Davidsz. de Heem	circa 1665	Tyrolean State Museum		34
	Globe, Books and Lute	Gerrit Dou	1635	private collection		35
	Hourglass and Inkpot on a Shelf	Gerrit Dou	1647	Wadsworth Atheneum		36a
	Money Bag and a Book on a Shelf	Gerrit Dou	1647	Armand Hammer		36b
	Still life: An Allegory of the Vanities of Human Life	Harmen Steenwijck	circa 1640	National Gallery	NG1256	37
	Corner of a painter's studio	Simon Luttichuys	1646	private collection		38
	Vanitas with self-portrait	David Bailly	1651	Museum De Lakenhal		38
	Coconuts	Albert Eckhout	circa 1645	National Museum of Denmark		39a
	Pineapple, papaya and other fruit	Albert Eckhout	circa 1645	National Museum of Denmark		39b
	Still Life with Peacocks	Rembrandt	1636	Rijksmuseum	SK-A-3981	40
	Still Life with a Dead Swan	Jan Baptist Weenix	1651	Detroit Institute of Arts	26.22	41
	Banquet Still Life	Adriaen van Utrecht	1644	Rijksmuseum	SK-C-301	42
	Game Birds and Fruit with a Dog and Parrot	Jan Fyt	1652	private collection		43
	Vase of Flowers	Jan Fyt	1660	Schloss Mosigkau		44
	Glasses, Smoking Implements, and Cards	Jan Jansz van de Velde	1653	Ashmolean Museum		45
	Still Life with Earthenware Jug and Clay Pipes	Pieter van Anraedt	1658	Mauritshuis	1045	46
	Corner of a Barn	Willem Kalf	1643	Detroit Institute of Arts		47
	Drinking horn with lobster and glassware	Willem Kalf	1653	National Gallery	NG6444	48
	Still Life with Silver Ewer	Willem Kalf	1656	Rijksmuseum	SK-A-199	49
	Still Life with Chinese Bowl and Nautilus	Willem Kalf	1662	Thyssen-Bornemisza Museum	203 (1962.10)	50
	Wineglass and a Bowl of Fruit	Willem Kalf	1663	Cleveland Museum of Art		51
	Door with towel brush and letter bag	Samuel van Hoogstraten	1655	Academy of Fine Arts Vienna		52
	Letter Board	Samuel van Hoogstraten	1662	private collection		53
	Still life with letter board	Samuel van Hoogstraten	1667	Staatliche Kunsthalle Karlsruhe		54
	Documents on a wall	Cornelis Brisé	1656	Amsterdam Museum	SA 3024	55
	An Open Cupboard Door	Cornelis Norbertus Gysbrechts	1665	Fresno Metropolitan Museum of Art and Science		56
	In Praise of Herring	Joseph de Bray	1656	Gemäldegalerie Alte Meister	1407	57
	Fish in a Basket near a Scale	Abraham van Beijeren	1655	Philadelphia Museum of Art	Cat. 639	58
	Silver Wine Jug, Ham, and Fruit	Abraham van Beijeren	circa 1665	Cleveland Museum of Art		59
	Vase of Flowers	Willem van Aelst	1658	private collection		60
	Dead Birds and Hunting Gear	Willem van Aelst	1664	Nationalmuseum Sweden	NM 301	61
	Seafood, Onion, and Glassware	Willem van Aelst	1679	Gemäldegalerie Alte Meister		62
	Skull, Money Bags, and Documents	N.L. Peschier	1661	Institut Néerlandais		63
	Large Vanitas	Pieter Boel	1663	Palais des Beaux-Arts de Lille		64
	Vanitas still life	Maria van Oosterwijck	1668	Kunsthistorisches Museum	GG 5714	65
	Game, Fish, and a Nest on a Forest Floor	Abraham Mignon	1675	Department of Paintings of the Louvre	INV 1553	66
	Still Life with Globe, Books, Sculpture, and Other Objects	Jan van der Heyden	1670	Academy of Fine Arts Vienna		67
	Vase of Flowers	Simon Pietersz Verelst	1670	Cleveland Museum of Art		68
	Flowers in a Glass Vase	Dirck de Bray	1671	Los Angeles County Museum of Art	M.2009.106.4	69
	Still Life with Flowers	Dirck de Bray	1674	private collection		70
	Still Life with Walnuts, Tobacco and Wine	Hubert van Ravesteyn	1671	Art Gallery of Ontario		71
	Still-Life with Chinese Teabowls	Pieter Gerritsz van Roestraten	circa 1675	Gemäldegalerie		72
	Still life near a fountain	Peeter Gijsels	circa 1685	Rijksmuseum	SK-A-2213	73
	Seashells	Adriaen Coorte	1698	Eijk and Rose-Marie van Otterloo Collection		74
	Gooseberries on a Table	Adriaen Coorte	1701	Cleveland Museum of Art	1987.32	75
	The Dead Swan	Jan Weenix	1716	Museum Boijmans Van Beuningen	1962 (OK)	76
	Flowers and fruit in a forest	Rachel Ruysch	1714	Augsburg Municipal Art Collection	12580	77
	Vase of Flowers on a Garden Ledge	Jan van Huysum	1730	private collection		78

== Sources ==
- Chong, Alan; Kloek, Wouter, eds. (1999). Still Life Paintings from the Netherlands, 1550 – 1720. Zwolle, Netherlands: Waanders Publishers. ISBN 978-90-400-9317-3. OL 9098218M.
