= Still Life of Fruit and Dead Fowl =

17th century painting by Harmen Steenwijck

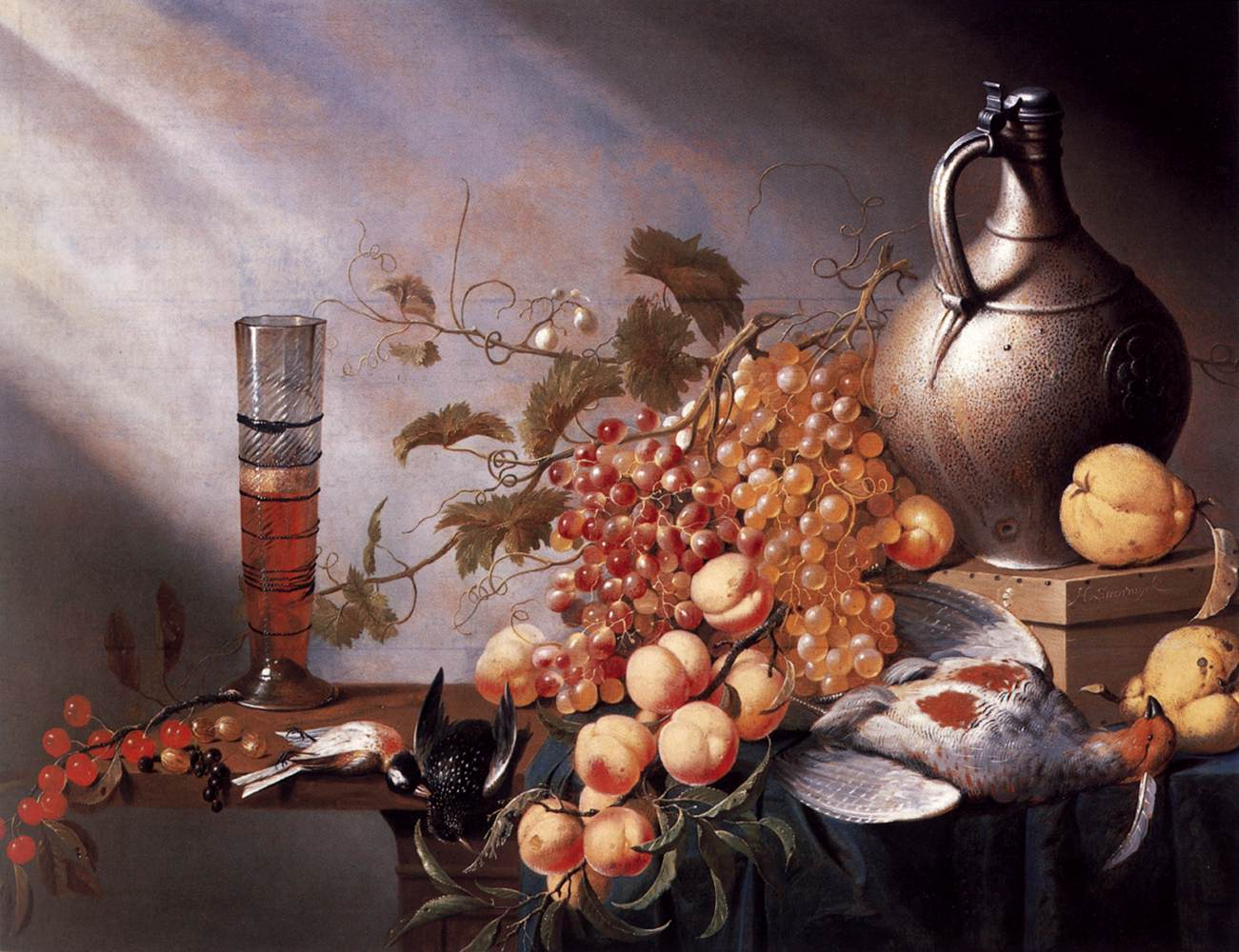
- Still Life of Fruit and Dead Fowl
- Artist: Harmen Steenwijck
- Year: c. 1650
- Medium: Oil-on-panel
- Subject: Still
- Dimensions: 77.5 cm (30.5 in) × 102 cm (40 in)
- Location: Private collection, Greenwich, Connecticut

Still Life of Fruit and Dead Fowl or A Stoneware jug, Fruit, and Dead Game Birds is a c. 1650 oil-on-panel still-life painting by the Dutch Golden Age painter Harmen Steenwijck was a still-life specialist.

== Description ==
The work is an oil-on-panel, and 77.5 cm (30.5 in) high and 102 cm (40 in) wide. It is in a private collection in Greenwich, Connecticut. In the image the table is piled high with kitchenware, fruit and birds.

The table has a dark blue cloth. On the table in the background there is a stoneware jug, and a beer glass. Directly in front of the beer glass there are two dead songbirds. In front of the jug is a dead partridge with a blood stain. Vines of red and white grapes are in front of the jug and a branch of peaches is spilling off of the front of the table. The jug and one peach both sit on a wooden box. Soft light cuts from the left on an angle glistening on the glass, jug, fruit and feathers.

== Reception ==
Steenwijck was masterful in manipulating the primary colors. Steenwijck used pastel colors for the background items so that the featured items would be more prominent. The red of the partridge head rests against a pale yellow peach. The bulbous pears bear a similarity to the shape of the stoneware jug and the curve of the bird wings are repeated in the leaves of the fruit vines.

== See also ==
- Still life paintings from the Netherlands, 1550–1720
- Still Life with Books, c. 1627-28 painting
