= Cabinet of curiosities (disambiguation) =

A cabinet of curiosities was an encyclopedic collection of types of objects whose categorical boundaries were, in Renaissance Europe, yet to be defined.

Cabinet of curiosities may also refer to:

== Literature ==
- The Cabinet of Curiosities, a 2002 novel by Douglas Preston and Lincoln Child
- A Case of Curiosities, a 1992 novel by Allen Kurzweil
- Cabinet of Natural Curiosities, an 18th-century zoological work by Albertus Seba

== Music ==
- A Cabinet of Curiosities, a 2009 set of albums by Jane's Addiction
- Cabinet of Curiosities (album), a 2014 album by The Pop Group

== Other media ==
- Cabinet of Curiosities, a 1993 touring theatre variety production by UK's Ra-Ra Zoo
- Kurios: Cabinet of Curiosities, a 2014 touring production by Cirque du Soleil
- A Cabinet of Curiosities (painting), a 1619 painting by Frans Francken II
- Guillermo del Toro's Cabinet of Curiosities, a 2022 Netflix horror anthology series
- Aaron Mahnke's Cabinet of Curiosities, a podcast featuring bizarre and unbelievable stories of the past
