= Still Life: An Allegory of the Vanities of Human Life =

17th-century painting by Harmen Steenwijck

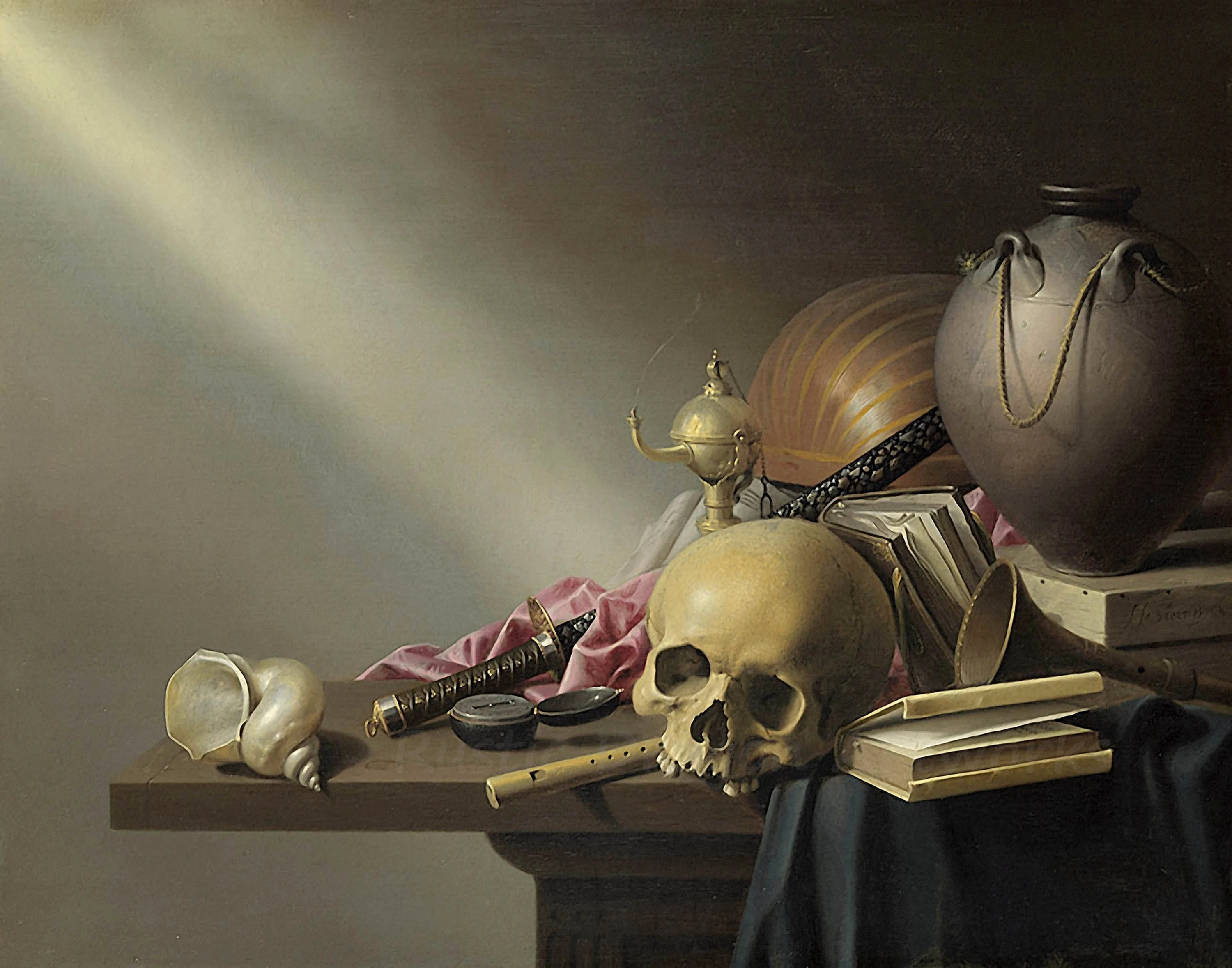
- Artist: Harmen Steenwijck
- Year: c. 1640
- Medium: Oil on oak panel
- Subject: Still life
- Dimensions: 39.2 cm × 50.7 cm (15.4 in × 20.0 in)
- Location: National Gallery, London
- Accession: NG1256

Still Life: An Allegory of the Vanities of Human Life is an oil-on-panel painting by the Dutch Golden Age painter Harmen Steenwijck. Created around 1640, the work is an allegorical vanitas. It has been in the collection of the National Gallery in London since 1888.

The painting includes a skull, a large pot, an ornate Japanese sword, a sea shell, and a lute. There is also a book, a watch and the front of a trumpet or horn. Several of the pieces are arranged so that they rest uncomfortably close to the edge of the table. The left side of the painting features a shaft of light cutting through the image.

The skull in the painting is an obvious reminder of human mortality. One art critic thought that the painting symbolizes knowledge, wealth and mortality of human life. Another critic stated that the painting has an allegorical religious theme with the shaft of light representing a higher power.

== History ==
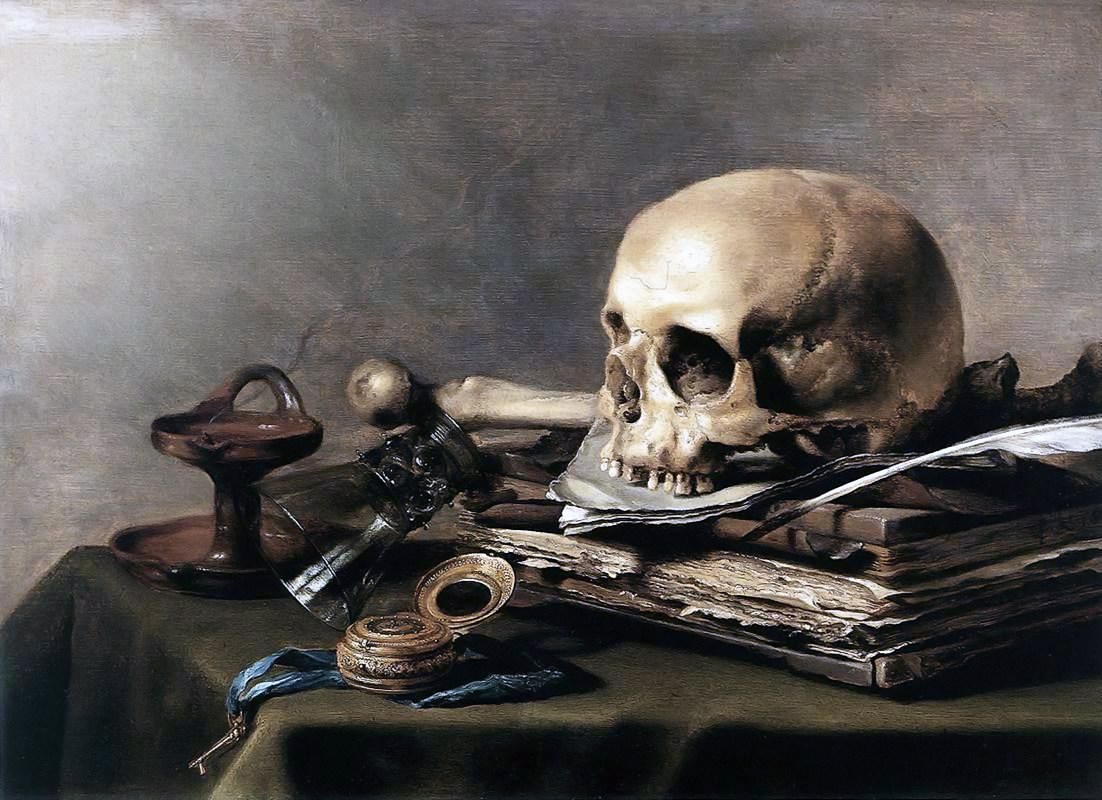
Pieter Claesz, Vanitas (1630)

Harmen Steenwijck's uncle, David Bailly, is often credited with inventing the artistic genre of vanitas, focusing on the transience of life. Bailly taught Steenwijck and his brother Pieter to paint in the Dutch city of Leiden. Steenwijck completed Still Life: An Allegory of the Vanities of Human Life around 1640; the painting is signed but undated, as was his practice.

In 1888, the painting was presented to the National Gallery in London by Lord Savile. Radiographic analysis of the work revealed that Steenwijck had originally included a bust of a man crowned with a wreath, which he painted over.

== Description ==
The work is a still life in the genre of vanitas, painted with oils on oak panel, and measuring 39.2 by 50.7 cm (15.4 by 20.0 in). Like most vanitas paintings, it contains deep religious overtones and was created to both remind viewers of their mortality (a memento mori) and to indicate the transient nature of material objects. The skull is the most obvious reminder of human mortality, which is also alluded to by delicate items such as the paper and the shell.

The painting includes a skull with missing teeth, almost falling off of the table. A frayed rope passes through the handles of a large pot. The face of the pot contains an image of a man's face. Several pieces are arranged so that they rest uncomfortably close to the edge of the table. An ornate Japanese sword, a sea shell, and a lute also feature in the image. The left side of the painting is essentially blank, with only a shaft of light cutting through the space. There is also a book, a watch and the front of a trumpet or horn.

Religion is a central allegorical theme in the painting. In the 2016 book Art and Music in the Early Modern Period, Katherine A. McIver wrote: The image "presents a jumble of exquisite possessions ... Each of these abandoned, hollow things receives its temporary luster from a higher source." The higher source is represented by a ray of sunlight that cuts directly to the right side of the skull in the painting.

In 2011, Elena Tuparevska of the University of Deusto stated that the painting symbolizes knowledge; the sword and shell are rare and therefore symbolize wealth. The lamp and watch symbolize the mortality of human life.

== Reception ==
In 2001, the authors of Vermeer and the Delft School critiqued the painting by saying that the surface textures of the objects are contrasting and the light is harsh. They also suggested that the painting encourages the viewer to pursue an active life, so that one may even reach a degree of immortality through one's accomplishments. The painting was included in the 2014 book 1000 Paintings of Genius.

== See also ==
- Catalogue of paintings in the National Gallery, London
- Still life paintings from the Netherlands, 1550–1720
