= Stephanie Shih =

American visual artist and linguist

Stephanie Shih (Chinese: 史欣雲) is a visual artist and linguist based in Los Angeles, California. She is known for her photo-based multimedia installation still lifes of food arrangements, which playfully and critically examine the intricacies of Asian American culture. Shih is also recognized for her commercial and editorial work, which includes photographs published in newspapers, magazines, books and online publications.

== Biography ==
Shih was born in the San Francisco Bay Area and currently lives and works in Los Angeles. She is a second generation Taiwanese-Chinese American. Her first experiences taking photographs were motivated by her father, who was an amateur photographer. He gave her an old half-frame camera and mentored her on technique and form.

In 2007, Shih attended the University of California, Berkeley, where she majored in linguistics and English. She earned her master's degree and PhD in linguistics from Stanford University in 2009 and 2014 respectively.

Shih's art practice began while in graduate school at Stanford University, where she wrote and photographed a well-known food blog called Desserts for Breakfast, which launched her photographic career.

Shih works as both a commercial and fine art photographer. Her editorial work includes commissions from the Los Angeles Times, The Ethel,Audubon Magazine, High Country News, and Bloomberg Businessweek.

Shih has been an artist in residence at the Oak Spring Garden Foundation (2024), Museums at Washington and Lee University (2023), and Joshua Tree Highlands Artist Residency (2022).

In 2023, the Los Angeles Center of Photography honored Shih's contributions to the field of photography with the Aline Smithson Next Generation Award for a Female Identifying Photographer.

In addition to her art career, Shih is a researcher and professor of linguistics at the University of Southern California.

== Artwork ==
Shih's artworks utilize painterly techniques, emblematic of classic Dutch still life painting. These elements include the dramatic use of shadow and the silhouetting of colorful objects in the foreground against a dark, painted background. In revisiting the classical tradition of still life artwork, Shih incorporates the extensive visual language and cultural experiences of Asian American identity, and often collaborates with fellow Asian American artists, chefs and entrepreneurs. Shih's exploration of Golden Age Dutch still lifes reveals the multicultural influences on artists such as Jan Brueghel and Johannes Vermeer. Dr. Jacqueline Chao, curator at the Dallas Museum of Art wrote that “Her work uses the still life as a cloaking device to forefront her perspective on Asian accomplishment, cultural wisdom, and intellect, deciphered when viewing Shih’s compositions through a Chinese art historical and Asian American lens.”

This conceptual discourse with the past and present is evident in her 2020 composition Brueghel’s Breakfast. Donuts from the Los Angeles staple, Cambodian American–owned DK Donuts, are woven into an arrangement of flowers. The donuts blend into the bouquet, symbolizing how donut shops have become a way for Asian American immigrants to make a living in the United States.

Another notable artwork, Onggi with Six Kimchi (2021) was inspired by Shih's observation of the kimchi-making process. The composition features flowers and handmade kimchi by Oliver Ko of Korilla Kimchi in pots by Los Angeles-based ceramicist Eunbi Cho.

Shih's collaboration with ceramicist Raina Lee, produced the composition Vase with Ten Bunflowers (2021), and homage to their love of Chinese pineapple buns, as well as Van Gogh's sunflowers, which were influenced by Japanese woodblock prints.

== Exhibitions ==
Shih's work has been exhibited in galleries and museums across the United States. Notable exhibitions include her debut solo exhibition, 開花結果 Open Flowers Bear Fruit (2023–2024) at the USC Pacific Asia Museum (Pasadena, CA). The exhibition displayed ten photographs from her ongoing “Asian American Still Life” series.

A 2023 stint as artist in residence at the Museums at Washington & Lee (Lexington, VA) culminated with Long Time No See 好久不見 (2024–2025), a solo exhibition, featuring altered photographs, video art, and ceramic installations incorporating selections from the museum's Reeves Collection of Ceramics, specifically Chinese export porcelain made for the European and American markets. Through the still life process, Shih threads the historical context of the exported ceramics with modern-day Asian American narratives, as well as food and introduced plant species found around southwestern Virginia.

Another solo exhibition titled 欣欣向荣 Flourish (2024–2025) at the Los Angeles Center for Photography, opened in conjunction with Shih receiving the inaugural Aline Smithson Next Generation Award.

Shih's work has also been exhibited in solo and group shows at Hashimoto Contemporary (Los Angeles, CA), Griffin Museum of Photography (Winchester, MA), and The Royal Photographic Society (Bristol, UK).
