= Verburg =

Verburg is a Dutch toponymic surname. It is a contraction of "Van der Burg", meaning "from the fortress / stronghold". Variants are Verborg, Verburch, Verburgh and Verburgt. Notable people with the surname include:

- Adriaan Verburgh (died 1602), Dutch painter
- David Verburg (born 1991), American sprinter
- Dionys Verburg (1655–1722), Dutch landscape painter
- Gerda Verburg (born 1957), Dutch diplomat, politician and trade union leader
- JoAnn Verburg (born 1950), American photographer
- Nicolaas Verburg (c.1620–1676), Dutch Governor of Formosa and Director General of the VOC council in Batavia
- Jake Verburg (c. 1989-), Eccentric California almond farmer
