= Still Life with Books =

17th-century painting by Jan Lievens

- Stilleven met boeken (Dutch)
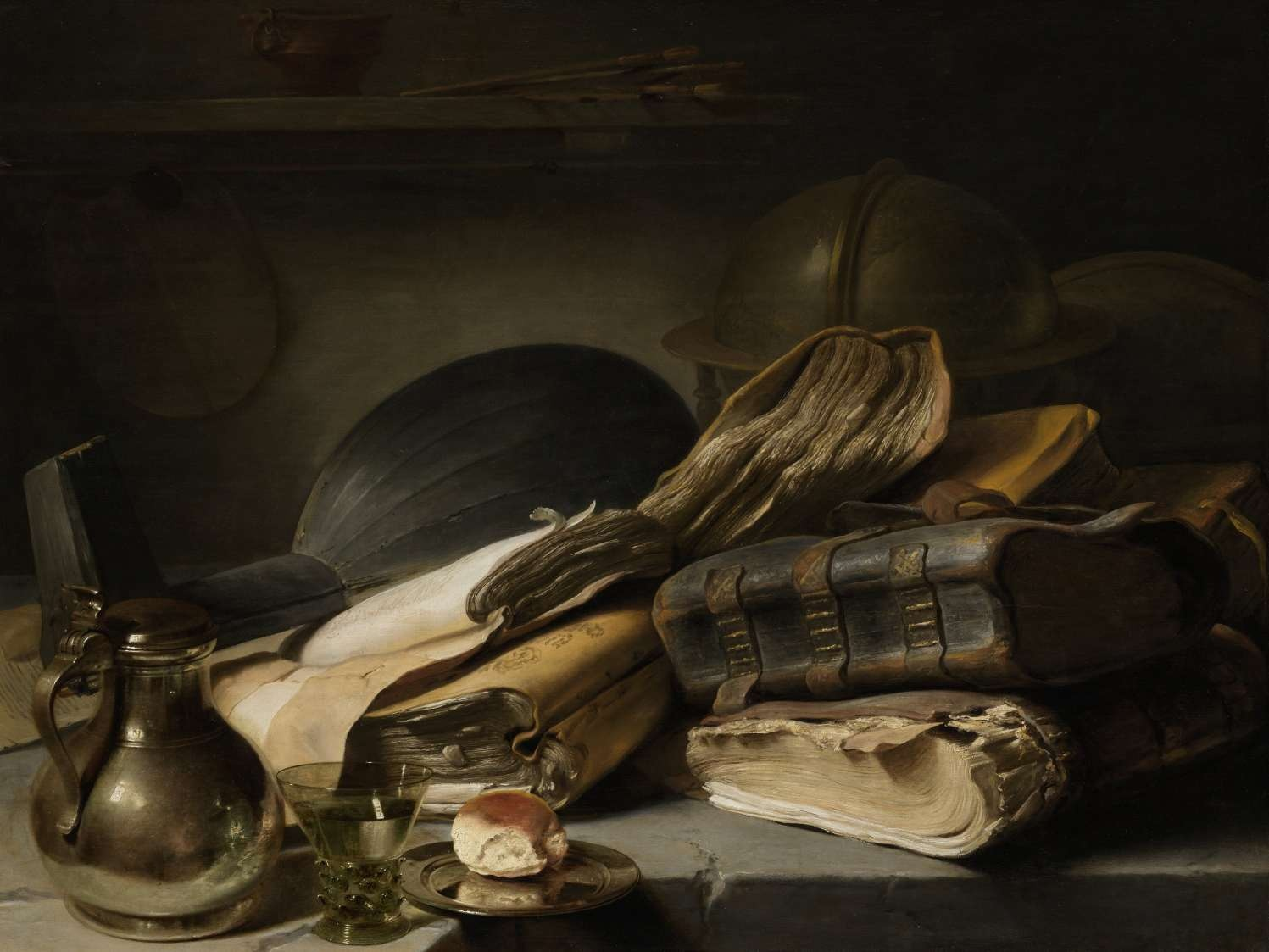
- Artist: Jan Lievens
- Year: c. 1627–1628
- Medium: Oil-on-panel
- Movement: Vanitas
- Subject: Still life
- Dimensions: 91 cm (36 in) × 120 cm (47 in)
- Location: Rijksmuseum, Amsterdam

Still Life with Books (Dutch: Stilleven met boeken) is a c. 1627–1628 oil-on-panel painting by Dutch artist Jan Lievens. The painting is an example of the Dutch vanitas genre and an example of Dutch realism. The painting was privately owned until it was purchased by the Rijksmuseum in 1963. For many years experts thought it was the work of Rembrandt.

The still life includes ledgers (books), a pewter jug, and pewter plate. There is also a bread roll, a Berkemeyer glass, two globes, a palette, and a lute case. Used and worn items appear in the back of the image and are contrasted with the fresh bread and other new items in the foreground.

== History ==
Still Life with Books was privately owned until the 20th century. The Rijksmuseum in Amsterdam purchased the painting and it has been in their collection since 1963. Dutch artist Jan Lievens completed the painting c. 1627–1628. Several of Lievens' early works (including Still Life with Books) were thought to be the work of the great Dutch master painter Rembrandt. Lievens and Rembrandt shared a studio, which may be how the painting was attributed to Rembrandt. Most experts now attribute the work to Lievens. X-radiographs have revealed that the pitcher which appears in the painting was painted over an incomplete book. Objects which appear to the left were added later.

=== Provenance ===
The painting was privately owned in England. It then appeared at an art dealer, Basil Wheeler. Next it was sold to P. Potter by Montpellier Galleries in London. On 28 April 1960 art dealer Han Jüngeling from The Hague acquired the painting. From 1960 to 1963 it was loaned to the Dordrechts Museum. In 1963 The Rijksmuseum purchased the painting. It was displayed at the Milwaukee Art Museum from 6 February 2009 to 26 April 2009 for an exhibition titled "Out of Rembrandt's Shadow".

== Description ==
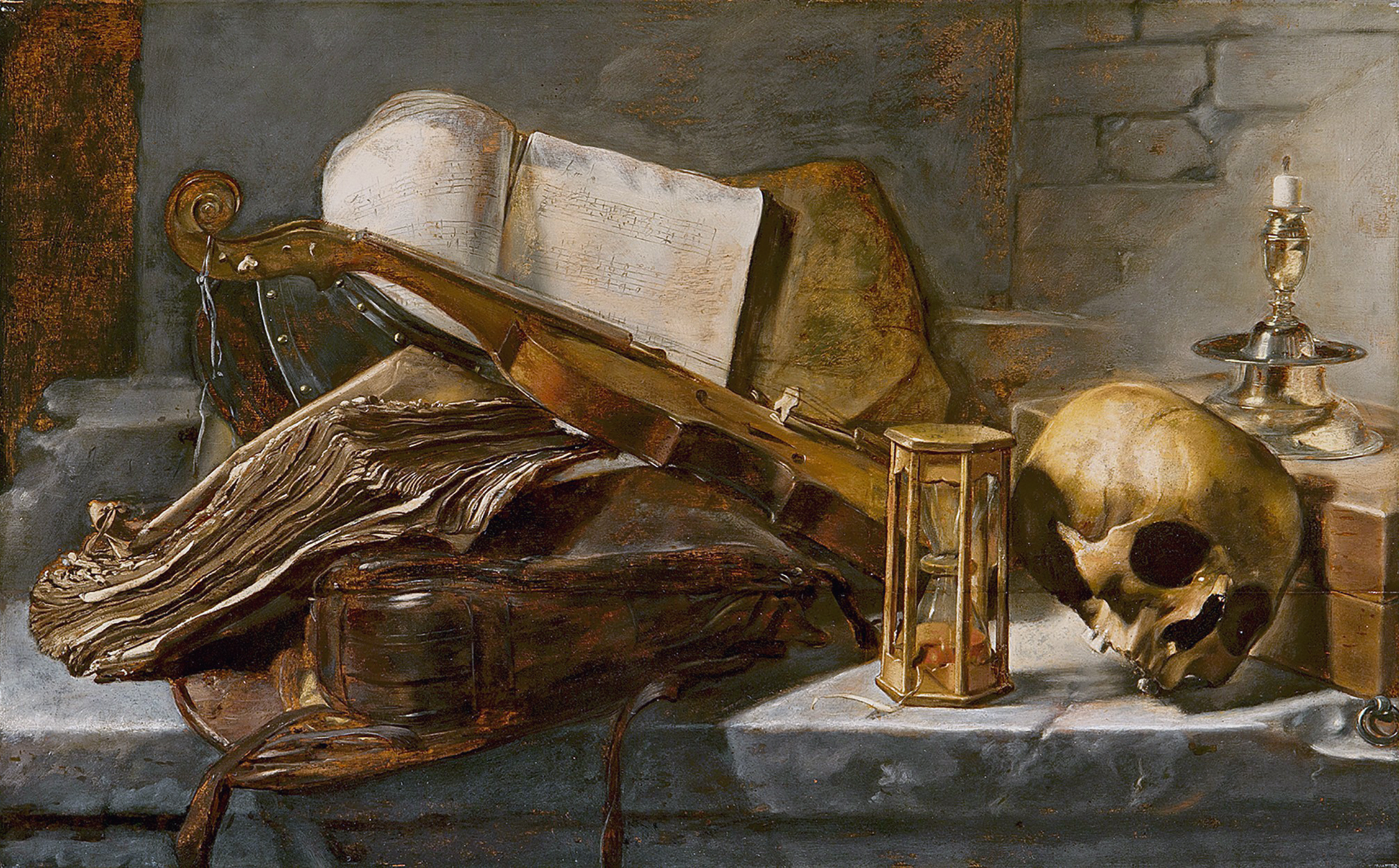
Vanitas still life, attributed to Lievens (Museum de Fundatie, Zwolle)

Still Life with Books is an oil-on-panel, with dimensions of 91 cm (36 in) × 120 cm (47 in). It is in the style of Spanish vanitas paintings. The idea of this style of painting was to show possessions and wealth are fleeting and mean nothing when one is faced with death. The vanitas genre involves subject matter which includes symbols depicting mortality or the perishable nature of material things. The style can be seen in 17th-century Dutch still life paintings.

In the image there is a lute case, which resembles a lute. The images of books display the bindings and they have soft covers of either leather or parchment. These books are used primarily for keeping documents or bills. The books are portrayed as empty bindings without substance. The items in the image all appear to be old and discarded things. In the image there is a pewter jug, and a pewter plate with bread roll. There are two globes and just above the lute case on the wall there is a palette.

Dutch art historian Pieter J.J. van Thiel stated that the lute case is the oddest item included in the painting. The painting is well-lit with light fading toward the back. He noted that many still life paintings have lutes, but they never have a lute case. He described the books which are prominently displayed in the painting, saying the bindings on the ledgers are not ordinary and they almost never appear in a 17th-century painting. Several ledger books in the painting have limp bindings without structure but two have a binding with laced-in supports along the spine. The ledger on the bottom with laced supports has deteriorated.

The painting underwent a complicated X-radiograph. After studying X-radiographs Van Thiel also believes the bread roll, glass, jug and plate were all added after the painting was completed. Van Thiel states that it was assumed the addition of the items was the work of another painter. Recently some authorities believe these items were added as the artist's "late inspiration". The conclusion is that Van Thiel does not know if the additional items were painted later, or it was an "uncharacteristic working method adopted by the artist".

In 1627 Lievens also painted a similar work titled, Vanitas still life. In the painting he used a skull, a violin, an extinguished candle and an hourglass, ostensibly to illustrate mortality. The painting was also attributed to Rembrandt for many years until a 2014 examination by experts at the Rijksmuseum determined that it was the work of Lievens.

== Reception ==
In the book, Crowning Glories Netherlandish Realism and the French Imagination During the Reign of Louis XIV, Harriet Stone called the painting "complex and richly inconsistent". Writing for The New York Review of Books, Benjamin Moser stated that the painting is a "large and deceptively simple work". Writing for Financial Times, Jackie Wullschläger referred to the painting as, "vanitas of leather bindings and shriveled old papers ... and meticulous Dutch realism". In the book, Still life Paintings from the Netherlands, 1550–1720, the authors said that "the entire work has an impulsive character".

Van Thiel said the meaning of the painting is open to debate. Although the painting was regarded as a vanitas Alan Chong (Currier Museum of Art) and Wouter Kloek (former curator at the Rijksmuseum) have said there are no obvious vanitas symbols – like a skull or an hourglass. Art historian Arthur K. Wheelock Jr. saw the bread as an unmistakable reference to the Eucharist. Van Thiel has ascribed new meaning to the painting: he stated that the ledgers are not actually books, but they are files. Unlike most scholarly books, files hold practical information like records. Ledgers occasionally appear in still life paintings but they are never featured so prominently as the main focus of a painting. The main feature of the ledger bindings may be to demonstrate their "ruinous state". Bindings like the ones in the painting have been featured in images of moneychangers, lawyers, and tax collectors. The degraded ledgers may represent degenerate people and the ledgers contrast with "The flawless jug, the gleaming glass of white wine and the fresh white roll." Those gleaming and fresh items may represent the opposite of corruption, or they may represent religion: wine and bread symbolize God for Christians. Van Thiel called the composition ingenious; coupling the positive elements with the negative. He concluded his critical analysis by observing that there is no text or inscription which accompany the painting, and that leaves individuals to ascribe their own meaning to the items in the painting.

== See also ==
- Still life paintings from the Netherlands, 1550–1720
- Still Life: An Allegory of the Vanities of Human Life, c. 1640 painting
