= The Parable of the Prodigal Son (Frans Francken II and Hieronymus Francken II) =

Oil painting by Frans Francken and Hieronymus Francken

- Dutch: De gelijkenis van de verloren zoon, French: Le parabole de l'enfant prodigue
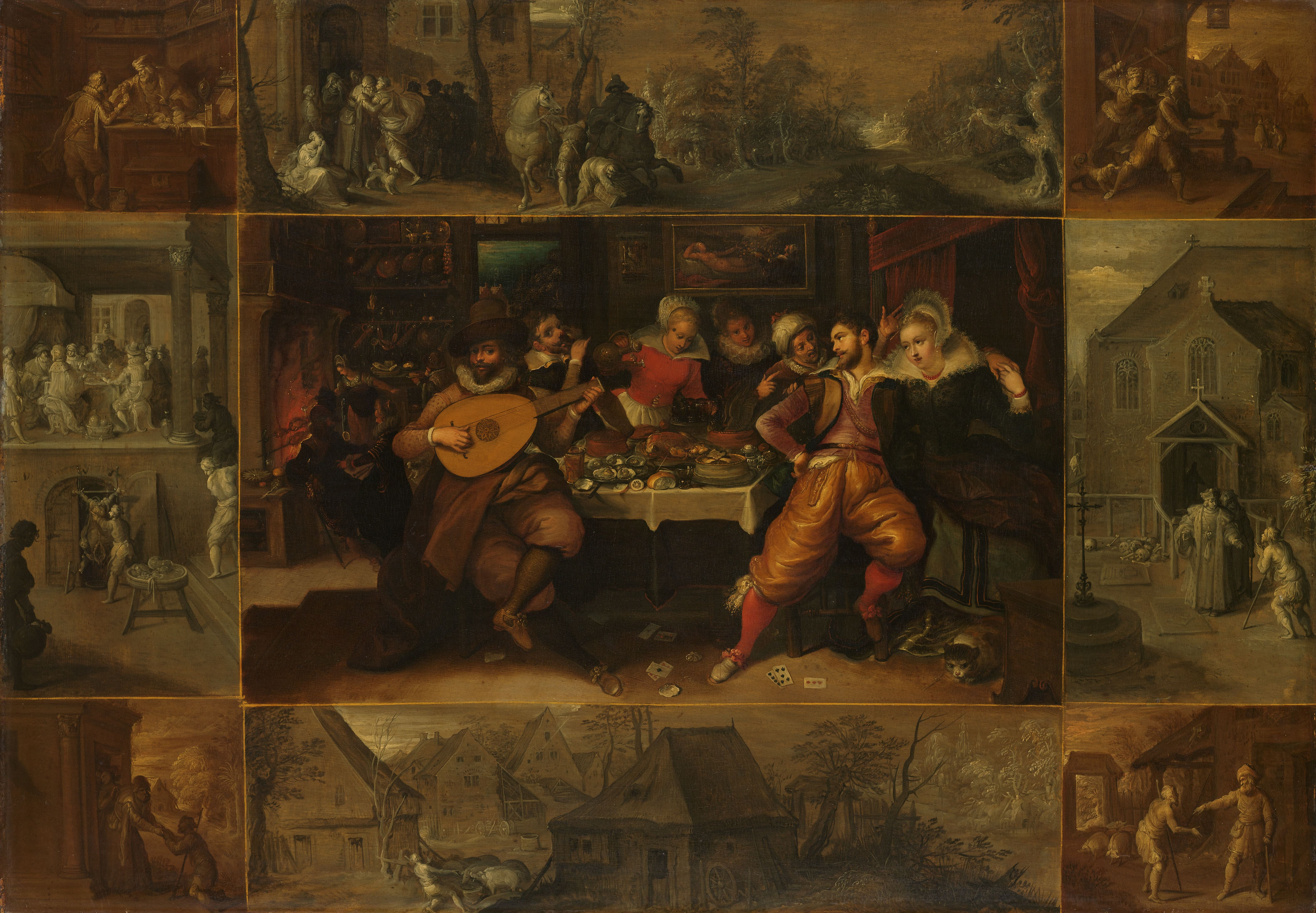
- Artist: Frans Francken the Younger and Hieronymus Francken II
- Year: c. 1610-1620
- Medium: Oil on Panel
- Dimensions: 60.4 cm × 85.9 cm (23.8 in × 33.8 in)
- Location: Rijksmuseum, Amsterdam

The Parable of the Prodigal Son is an oil painting by the brothers Frans Francken the Younger and Hieronymus Francken II, now in the collection of the Amsterdam Museum. It was created sometime between 1610 and 1620 in Antwerp and was acquired by the Amsterdam art collector Adriaan van der Hoop in 1843, who donated it to the city in 1854. It is on long term loan to the Rijksmuseum.

== Background ==
The story of the Prodigal Son is told in Luke 15:11-32. The story begins with an unnamed son (the "Prodigal Son") asking his father for his inheritance. After receiving his inheritance, the son travelled to a distant country where he spent all of his money recklessly. After a famine took place in that country he found himself desperately poor. The prodigal son eventually decided to return home and beg his father forgiveness. He immediately began to admit his sins and wrongdoings and declared himself not worth to be his father's son. The father accepts his son back without hesitation and told his servants to dress his son in the finest robe and to slaughter the fatted calf in order to celebrate his safe return home. the prodigal son's older brother, who was working in the fields, was angry with his father for celebrating his brother's return when he himself had never left and he worked hard in the fields everyday. The story concludes with the father explaining that the older son was always present, and everything that the father owned belonged to the older son. His brother had returned when he had already received his inheritance and did not need to return home, and this was a cause for celebration.

== The Artists ==
Brothers Hieronymus II and Frans II were born into the third generation of an Antwerp family that included three successive generations of artists. Both men had a similar style when painting figures which is sometimes attributed to their similar training, under their father Frans I in Antwerp and in Paris under their uncle Hieronymus I and the fact that they worked in close proximity throughout their respective careers.

=== Hieronymus Francken II ===
Not much is known about Hieronymus Francken II. He born 1578 in Antwerp. It is widely believed that he trained with his father, Frans Francken I, for several years before working as an apprentice to his uncle Ambrosius I. He joined the Antwerp Guild of St. Luke in 1607 and was a master there until his death in 1623.

=== Frans Francken II ===
Frans Francken II, born in 1581, is arguably the most widely known member of the Francken family. In 1605, Frans II joined the Antwerp Guild of St. Luke, where he became a master and served as a deacon in 1616. Frans II was well known for his work in narrative and allegorical cabinet paintings on wood and copper. He was most known for his ability to fit large crowds of small figures into his paintings. Frans II signed his work with the signature den jon F. Franck (meaning 'the younger') to differentiate his work from his father's until the death of his father in 1616. Frans the Younger introduced several new subjects into Flemish art including singeries and Kunstkammer.

== Visual description ==
The board on which The Prodigal Son is painted is separated into nine sections that outline the parable. A central scene is framed by smaller images: 4 on the right, 3 on the left, and 1 each on the top and the bottom. The largest, center section describes the scene in which the Prodigal Son spends his inheritance. The son is depicted with his arm around a woman, sitting on the edge of the bed. Sitting next to the son, we can see a man playing a lute, while a woman pours drinks into cups. Oysters and pastries are stacked on the table and something is being roasted over the fire in the hearth. There are also playing cards scattered across the floor. The painting on the wall is widely believed to be of Jupiter and Danae. The 8 smaller images that frame the central scene are depicted using grisaille. Starting in the top left corner, the Prodigal Son is receiving his inheritance. Moving clockwise, the next scene shows the son saying farewell to his family, followed by the son being chased from a building by an unknown woman. The next scene shows a depiction of the son begging with a priest, presumably for money or food, while standing in a cemetery. This is followed by an image in which the son is dismissed by his master. After that, we see the son tending to the pigs before we see him returned home to beg his father for forgiveness in the next scene. In the final scene we see the fattened calf being slain and a party being thrown.

== Sources ==
- “Description Des Tableaux : Museum Van Der Hoop (Amsterdam, Netherlands) : Free Download, Borrow, and Streaming.” Internet Archive, Amsterdam : Imprimerie De La Ville, 1 Jan. 1879, https://archive.org/details/descriptiondesta00muse/page/22/mode/2up.
- Francken, Hieronymus. The Parable of the Prodigal Son. n.d., Rijksmuseum, Amsterdam, https://www.rijksmuseum.nl/en/search/objects?q=frans+Francken+(ii)&p=2&ps=12&st=Objects&ii=4#/SK-C-286,16.
- The Harper Collins Study Bible. HarperOne, 2006. ISBN 9780061228407
- Härting, Ursula. “Francken Family.” Oxford Art Online, 2003, https://doi.org/10.1093/gao/9781884446054.article.t029667.
- Wyss, Edith. “A 'Triumph of Love' by Frans Francken the Younger; From Allegory to Narrative.” Artibus Et Historiae, vol. 19, no. 38, 1998, pp. 43–60. JSTOR, https://doi.org/10.2307/1483586.
