= Adriaen van der Burch =

Dutch Golden Age painter

Adriaen van der Burch, or Adriaan Verburgh / Verburch (died 1602, Leiden), was a Dutch Golden Age painter.

== Biography ==
According to Houbraken, Adriaan Verburg was one of the teachers of David Bailly. After he first learned engraving from Jacob de Gheyn II for a year, Bailly was sent to Verburch by his father to learn oil painting.

The Netherlands Institute for Art History (RKD) mentions that he was active in Amsterdam between 1587 and 1598 and that he married Anna de Gheyn (1570-1632) in 1593. From 1598 to 1602 he was a poorter of Leiden. He was a pupil of James de Rijke and was a teacher of David Bailly. He is possibly the same person or the father of the actor and playwright Adriaen van den Bergh, who translated plays from English and performed in chambers of rhetoric in Utrecht and Leiden in the first half of the 17th century.

He could also be the same person as the "Jan Verburgh" that Houbraken claims was the teacher of Jan Gerritsz van Bronckhorst.
