= Pieter Steenwijck =

Dutch Golden Age painter

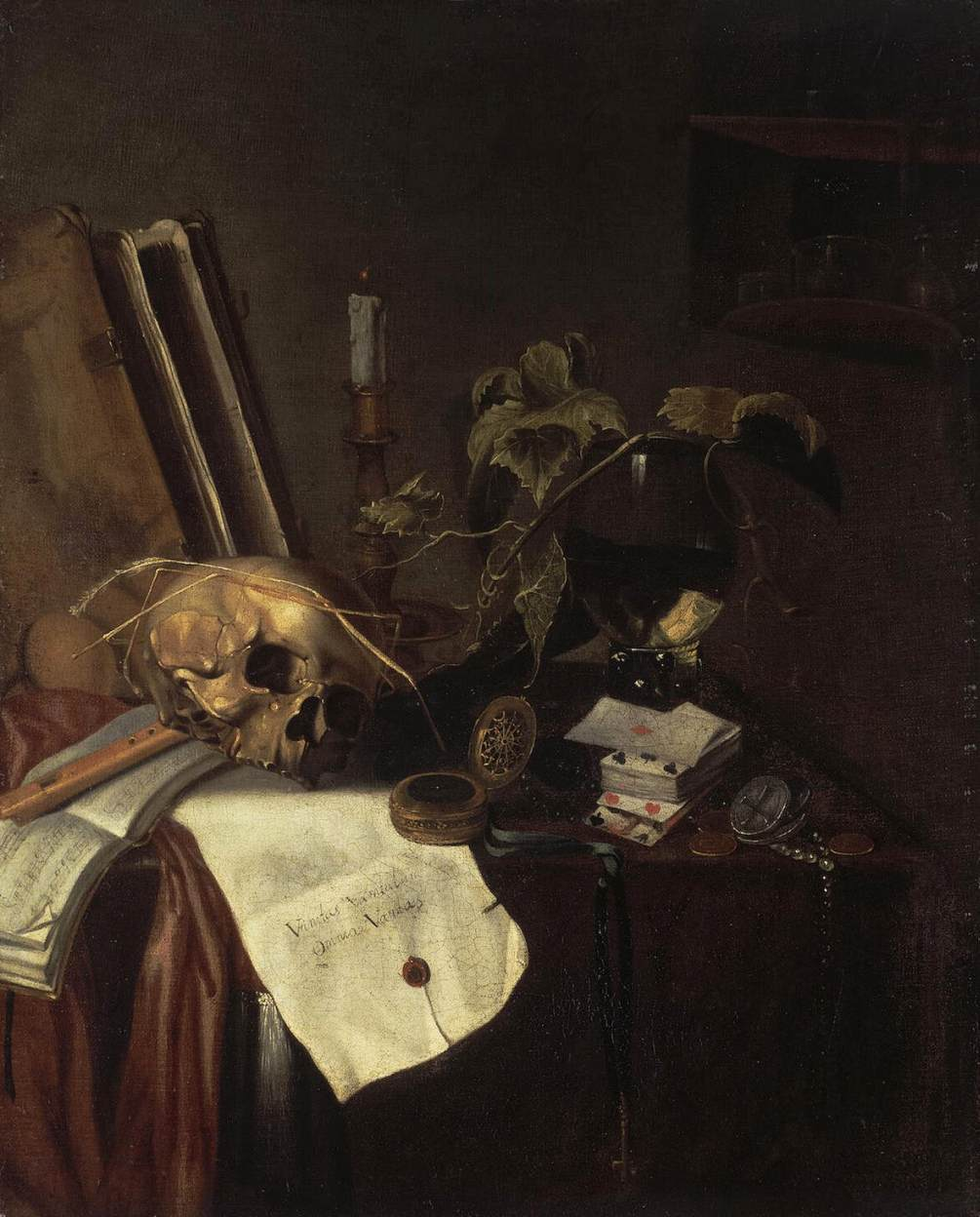
Vanitas with skull, watch with blue ribbon, flute with music book, and sealed parchment with "Vanitas omnia vanitas"

Pieter Steenwijck (c. 1615, Delft – 1666, Delft), was a Dutch Golden Age painter.

== Early life ==
Steenwyck was born in Delft, c. 1615. He was the brother of Harmen Steenwijck, also a still-life painter. His father was Evert Hamenz who was an eyeglass maker. He and his brother were taught to paint by their uncle David Bailly in Leiden. Baily is credited with inventing the vanitas genre and he influenced Steenwyck to paint in the vanitas genre.

== Career ==
In 1642 he became a member of the Delft Guild of St. Luke and in 1644 he became a member of the Leiden Guild of St. Luke.
