= A Cabinet of Curiosities (painting) =

Painting by Frans Francken the Younger

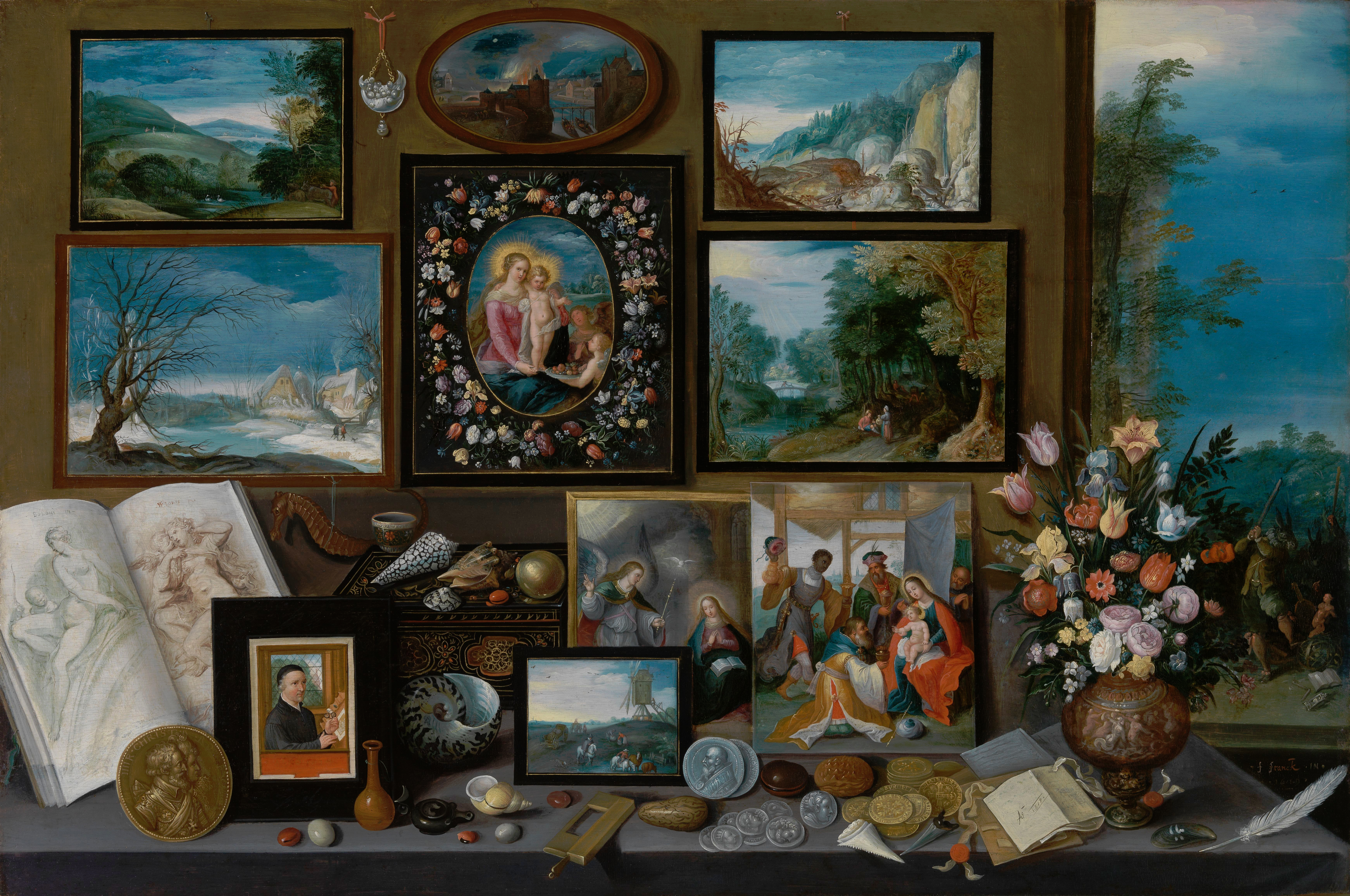
- Artist: Frans Francken the Younger
- Year: 1619
- Medium: oil on panel
- Dimensions: 56 cm × 85 cm (22 in × 33 in)
- Location: Royal Museum of Fine Arts Antwerp, Antwerp

A Cabinet of Curiosities (Dutch: Een kunstkamer) is a 1619 oil on panel painting of a cabinet of curiosities by the Flemish painter Frans Francken the Younger. It is now in the Royal Museum of Fine Arts, Antwerp, which bought it in 1903 from the Antwerp-based art dealer Joseph Hallyn.

== Bibliography ==
- (in Dutch) America Bruid van de zon. Gent : Imschoot, 1991.
- (in German) Balis, Arnout et al. Das Flämische Stilleben 1550 – 1680. Lingen: Luca, 2002.
- (in Dutch) Chong, Alan et al. Het Nederlandse Stilleven 1550 – 1720. Zwolle : Waanders, 1999.
- (in Dutch) De Baere, Bart et al., red. Beelddenken: vijf eeuwen beeld in Antwerpen. Schoten : BAI, 2011.
- (in Dutch) De Bie, Cornelis. Het gulden cabinet vande edel vry schilder const: inhoudende den lof vande vermarste schilders, architecten, beldthouwers ende plaetsnyders, van dese eeuw. Antwerpen : gedruckt by Jan Meyssens [Meyssens, Joannes], 1661.
- (in German) Härting, Ursula. Studien zur Kabinetbildmalerei des Frans Francken II, 1581 – 1642. Hildesheim: Olms, 1983.
- In the presence of things: four centuries of European still-life painting. Lisbon : Calouste Gulbenkian Foundation, 2010.
- (in Dutch) Koninklijk Muzeum van Schoone Kunsten te Antwerpen, Beschrijvende Catalogus I Oude Meesters 1905. Antwerpen: Boek- en Steendrukkerij Jan Boucherij, 1905.
- (in Dutch) Schrijvers, Nanny. In De tulp. Een wandelparcours door de tuinen en musea van Antwerpen, red. Sofie De Ruysser; Iris Kockelbergh en Myriam Wagemans. Antwerpen : Stadsbestuur, 2006.
- (in French) Speth – Holterhoff, S. Les peintres flamands de cabinet d’amateurs au 17e siècle. Bruxelles : Elsevier, 1957.
- (in Dutch) Van der Schueren, Katrien. “De kunstkamers van Frans II Francken: kritsche analyse van de aldaar aanwezige sculptuur.” In Jaarboek Koninklijk Museum voor Schone Kunsten Antwerpen 1996.
- (in Dutch) Van Hout, Nico. Bezoekersgids Het Gulden Cabinet. Koninklijk Museum bij Rockox te gast, 2013, p. 55.
- (in Dutch) Van Hout, Nico. Bezoekersgids Het Gulden Cabinet. Koninklijk Museum bij Rockox te gast. The Sky is the Limit. Het landschap in de Nederlanden, 2017, p. 84.
