= Frans Francken the Younger =

Flemish painter (1581–1642)

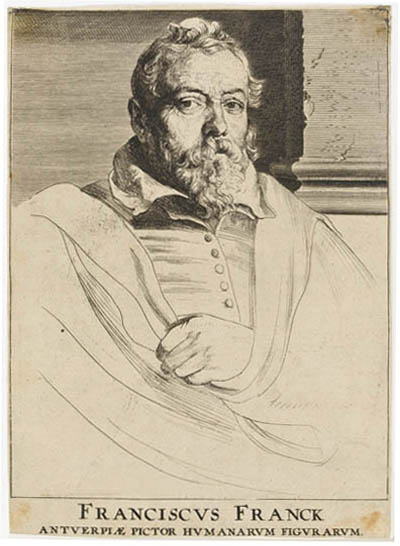
- Frans Francken by Anthony van Dyck
- Born: 1581; Antwerp, Habsburg Netherlands
- Died: May 6, 1642 (aged 60–61); Antwerp
- Occupation: Painter

Frans Francken the Younger (1581, Antwerp – 6 May 1642, Antwerp) was a Flemish painter and the best-known and most prolific member of the large Francken family of artists. He painted large altarpieces for churches as well as smaller historical, mythological and allegorical scenes. His depictions of collectors' cabinets established a popular new genre of art in the era. Francken often collaborated with other artists, adding figures and narrative elements to scenes created by specialists in landscape, architectural and floral still life paintings.

== Life ==
Frans Francken the Younger was born in Antwerp where he was baptized on 6 May 1581 in the Cathedral of Our Lady. He was the son of Frans Francken the Elder and Elisabeth Mertens. His father was a pupil of Antwerp's leading history painter Frans Floris and one of the most important creators of altar pieces of his time in Flanders. Frans Francken the Younger trained with his father Frans the Elder. Frans, together with his brother Hieronymus Francken II, may also have received additional training in the workshop of their uncle Hieronymus Francken I in Paris.

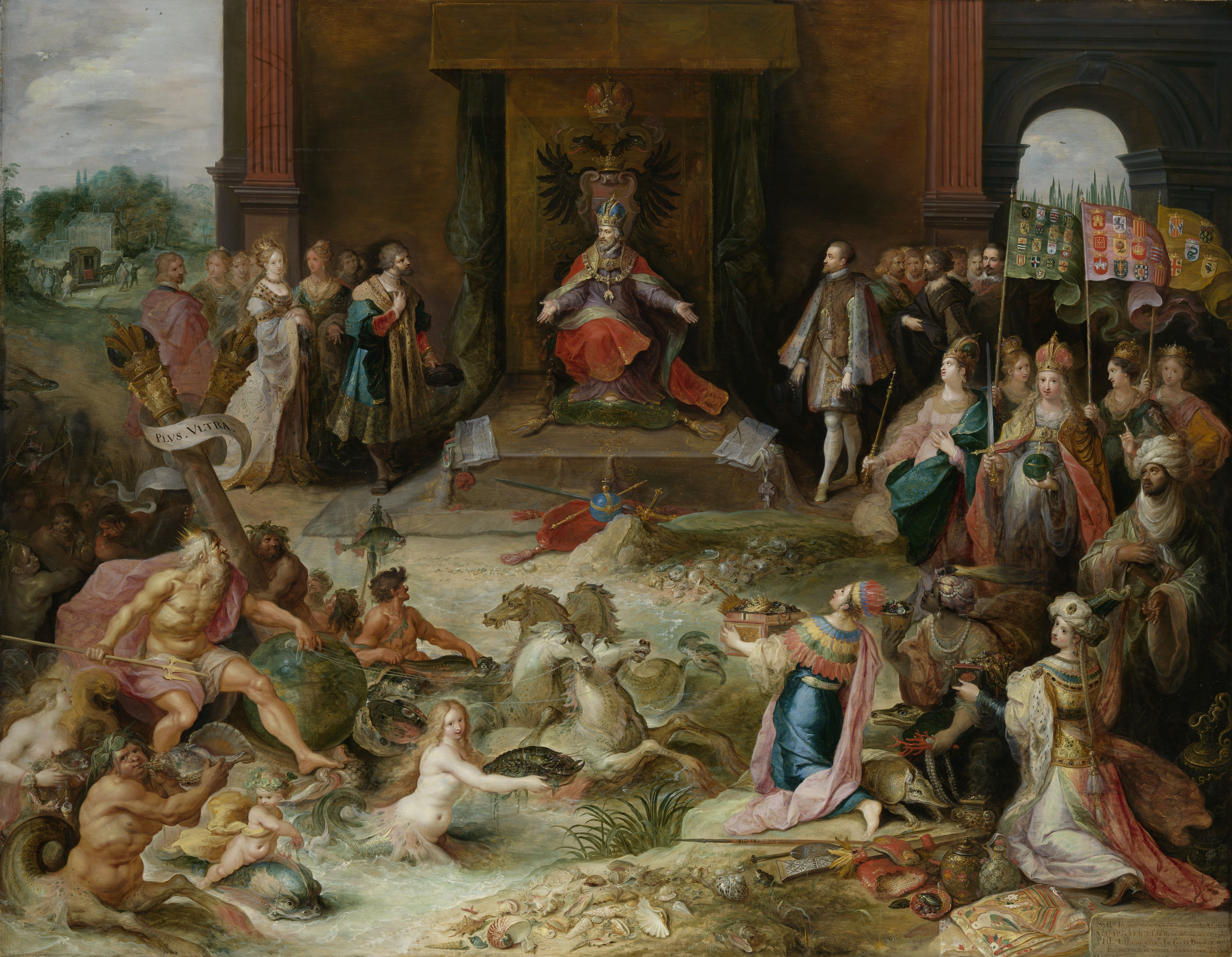
Allegory on Emperor Charles V's abdication in Brussels

Frans Francken the Younger likely first worked in the family workshop before he became an independent master in the Antwerp Guild of Saint Luke in 1605. He was deacon of the Guild in 1616. Francken's talent was recognised from an early age. He became a very successful artist and operated a large workshop which made many copies of his original compositions. Already in 1607 he was able to buy a house in the city centre where he established his residence and workshop.

Francken married Elisabeth Plaquet 'with the special permission of the bishop' in Antwerp on 8 November 1607. This may have had something to do with the fact that their firstborn son was born before the end of 1607. The son was given the same name as his father and grandfather. He would be known as Frans III and as an artist he earned himself later the nickname the Rubense Francken (the Rubensian Francken). Three further boys and five girls were born to the Francken couple. One of them, Hieronymus, would also become a painter.

Frans Francken the Younger's pupils included Daniel Hagens (1616/17), the Monogrammist N.F., his brother Hieronymus II and his son Frans III.

== Work ==
=== General ===
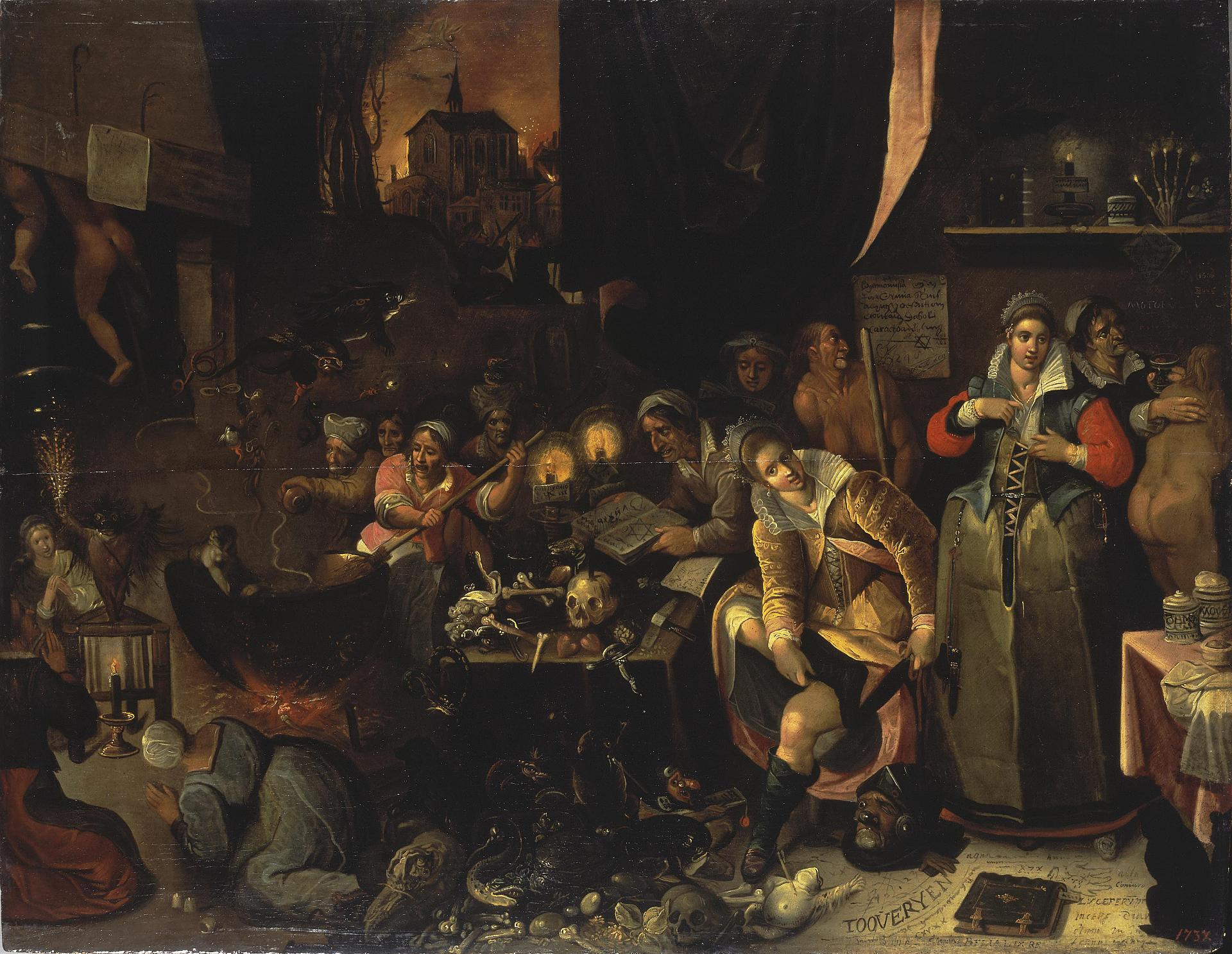
Witches' Kitchen, 1606

Francken was a versatile artist who practiced in many genres and introduced new subjects into Flemish art. Many of his works are small historical, allegorical and biblical cabinet paintings with the focus on figures. He also invented or popularized several new themes that became popular in Flemish painting, such as genre scenes populated by monkeys (also referred to as singeries) and Kunstkammer or gallery paintings displaying a wealth of natural and artistic treasures against a neutral wall. Francken introduced many other unusual themes that later became popular, such as the 'Triumphal Procession of Amphitrite' and 'Croesus and Solon'. Francken also made a series of paintings depicting witches and witchcraft, including portrayals of witches' sabbats.

Francken signed his works with 'de jonge Frans Francken' ('the young Frans Francken') before the death of his father in 1616. From the late 1620s he used the signature 'de oude Fr. Francken' ('the old Fr. Francken'), to distinguish himself from his son Frans III. His father had also started signing his paintings with 'den oude Frans Francken' ('the old Frans Francken') after Frans Francken the Younger had become active as an artist.

His paintings are held by most major museums in Europe.

=== Collaborations ===
Francken specialized in painting the human figure, which is suggested by etched and engraved portraits of the artist made by Anthony van Dyck (after Peter Paul Rubens) that identify him by the Latin inscription: 'ANTVERIÆ PICTOR HVMANARVM FIGVRARVM' (Figure painter of Antwerp). He was frequently invited to contribute figure staffage in compositions by other artists, such as the landscape artists Tobias Verhaecht, Abraham Govaerts and Joos de Momper, the architectural painters Pieter Neeffs the Elder, Pieter Neeffs the Younger, Hendrik van Steenwijk I, Paul Vredeman de Vries and Bartholomeus van Bassen and flower painters such as Jan Brueghel the Elder and Andries Daniels.

=== Allegorical paintings ===
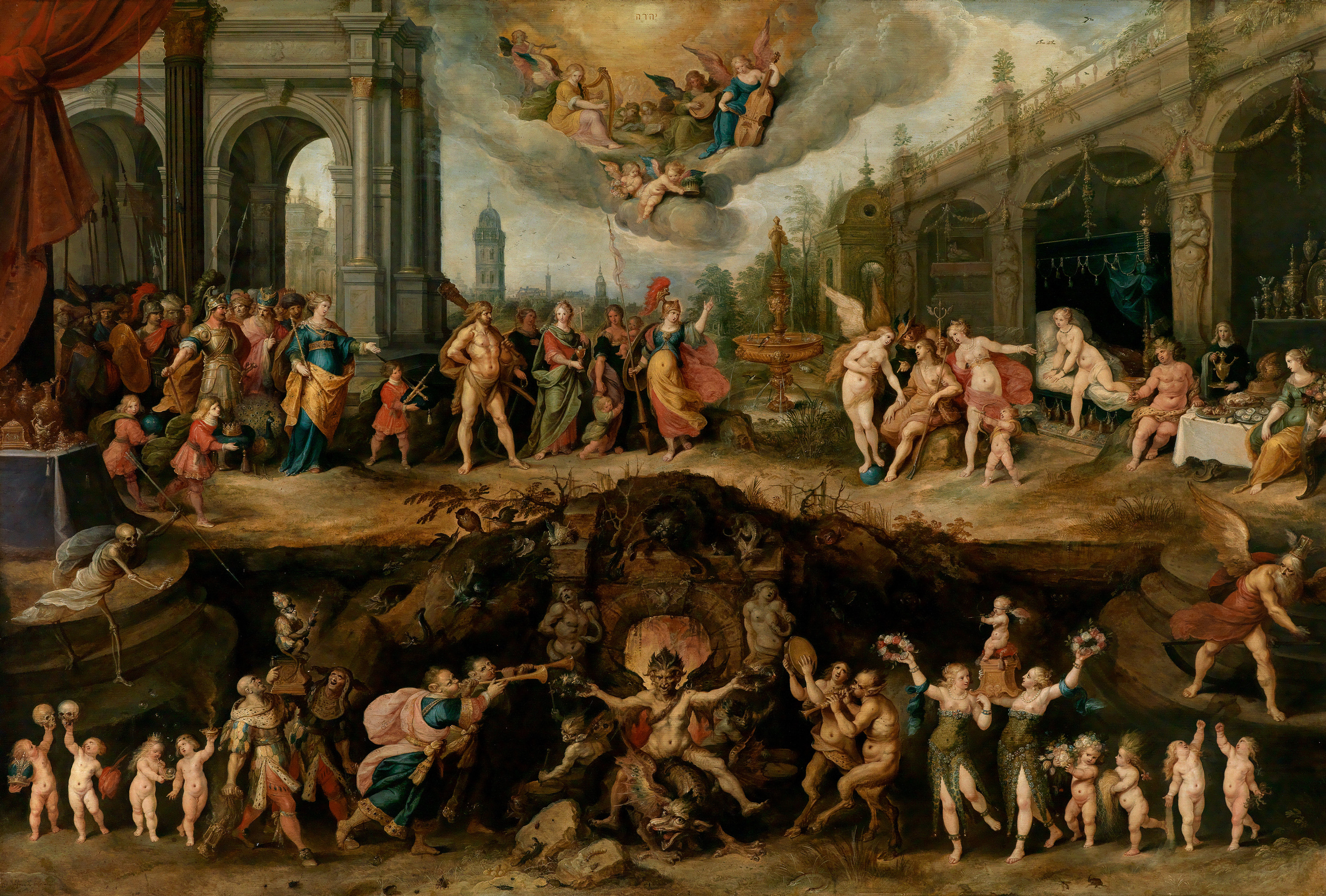
Mankind's Eternal Dilemma: The Choice Between Virtue and Vice

Francken created many allegorical paintings including Allegory on the Abdication of Emperor Charles V in Brussels (Rijksmuseum). The scene shows Charles V dividing his empire after a life of continuous warfare and ill health, seated on his throne flanked by his successors Ferdinand I and Philip II. In front of Philip, personifications of the territories of the Empire with their banners are kneeling down. In the foreground, the personifications of the continents America, Africa, Europe and Asia are offering gifts. On the left, Neptune is riding his seahorse-drawn triumphal chariot, accompanied by mermen, mermaids and tritons. On the chariot are visible a globe and the two columns with a banderole inscribed with Plus Ultra.

Another allegorical painting is the composition Mankind's Eternal Dilemma: The Choice Between Virtue and Vice (on loan to the Museum of Fine Arts, Boston. This work is believed to have been painted at the occasion of a wedding and combines mythological and Christian symbolism. It presents the eternal choice of mankind between virtue and vice and depicts the three regions of heaven, earth and hell.

=== Gallery paintings ===
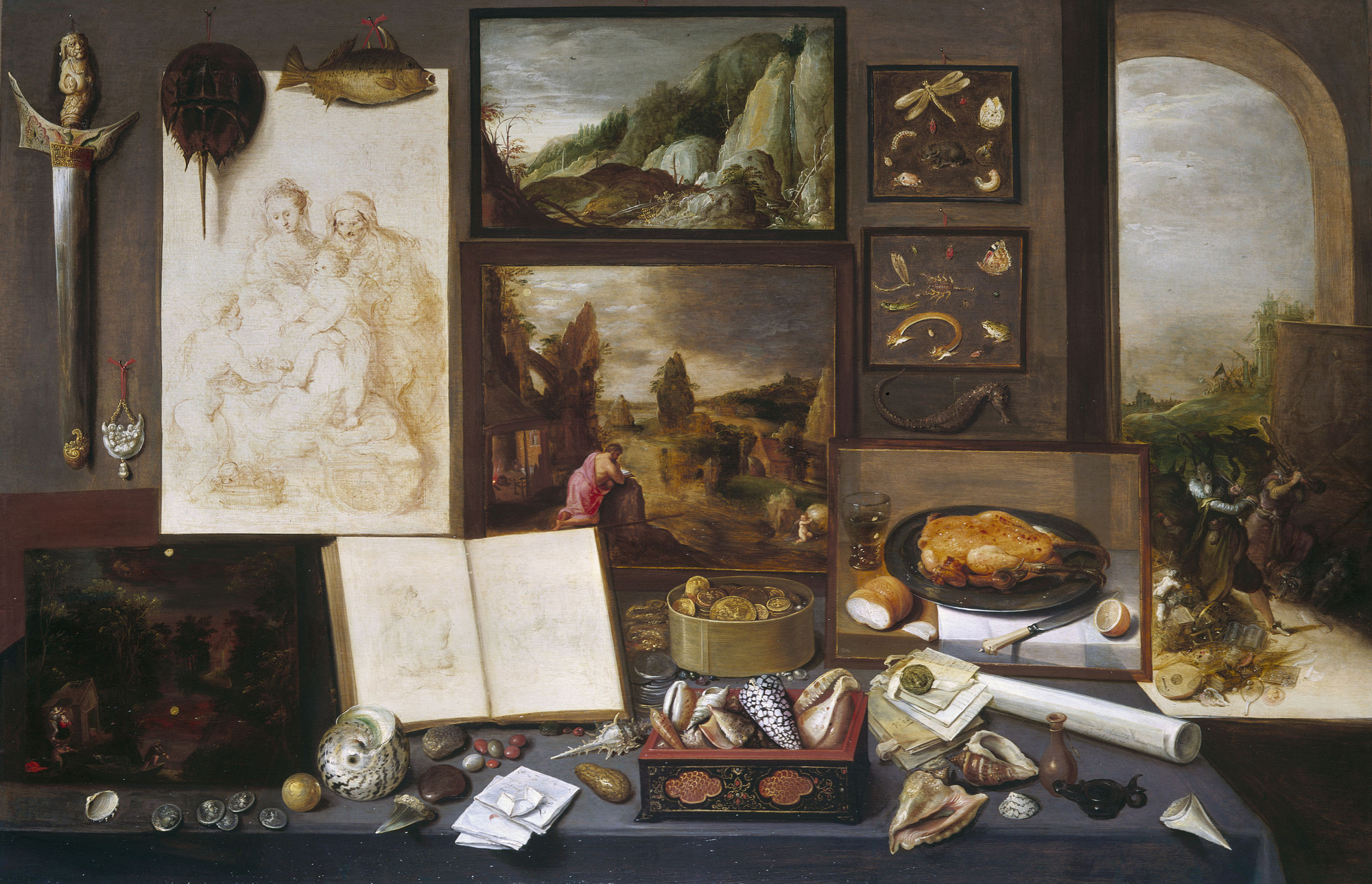
Cabinet of a collector

Frans Francken the Younger and Jan Brueghel the Elder were the first artists to create paintings of art and curiosity collections in the 1620s, such as A Cabinet of Curiosities. Gallery paintings depict large rooms in which many paintings and other precious items are displayed in elegant surroundings. The earliest works in this genre depicted art objects together with other items such as scientific instruments or peculiar natural specimens. Some gallery paintings include portraits of the owners or collectors of the art objects or artists at work.

The paintings are heavy with symbolism and allegory and are a reflection of the intellectual preoccupations of the age, including the cultivation of personal virtue and the importance of connoisseurship. The genre became immediately quite popular and was followed by other artists such as Jan Brueghel the Younger, Cornelis de Baellieur, Hans Jordaens, David Teniers the Younger, Gillis van Tilborch and Hieronymus Janssens.

=== Singeries ===
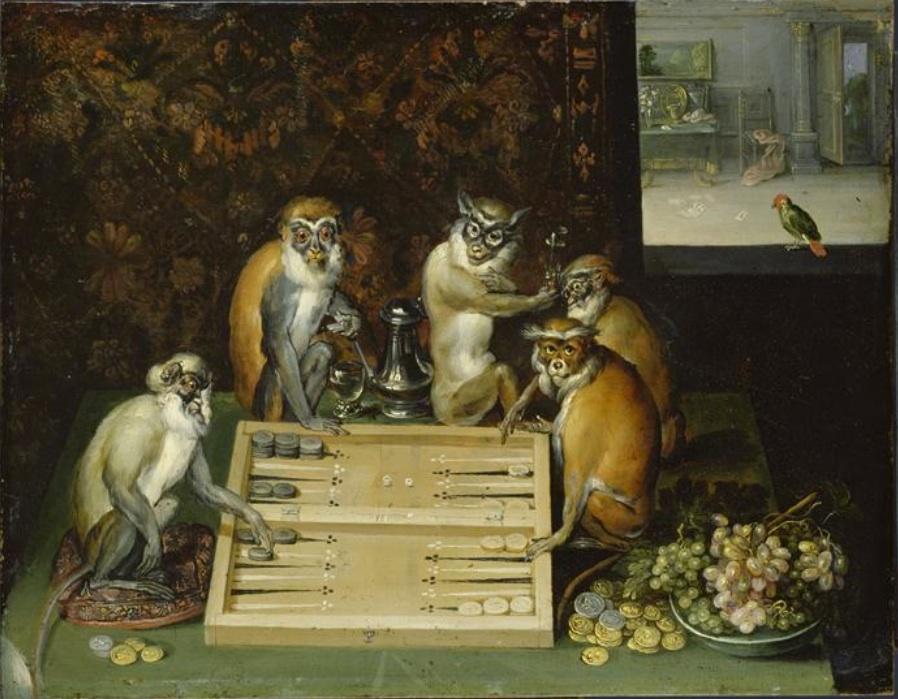
Monkeys playing backgammon

Francken played a key role in the development of the genre of the singerie, i.e. comical paintings of monkeys in human activities and attire, often to highlight the folly of humanity. The French-language word 'singerie' means a 'comical grimace, behavior or trick'. Comical scenes with monkeys appearing in human attire and a human environment are a pictorial genre that was initiated in Flemish painting in the 16th century and was subsequently further developed in the 17th century.

The Flemish engraver Pieter van der Borcht introduced the singerie as an independent theme around 1575 in a series of prints, which are strongly embedded in the artistic tradition of Pieter Bruegel the Elder. These prints were widely disseminated and the theme was then picked up by other Flemish artists. The first one to do so was Frans Francken the Younger who played an important role in the development of the genre. Other Antwerp artists subsequently contributing to the genre were Jan Brueghel the Elder and the Younger, Sebastiaen Vrancx and Jan van Kessel the Elder. David Teniers the Younger became the principal practitioner of the genre and developed it further with his younger brother Abraham Teniers. Later in the 17th century Nicolaes van Verendael started to paint these 'monkey scenes' as well.

=== Garland paintings ===
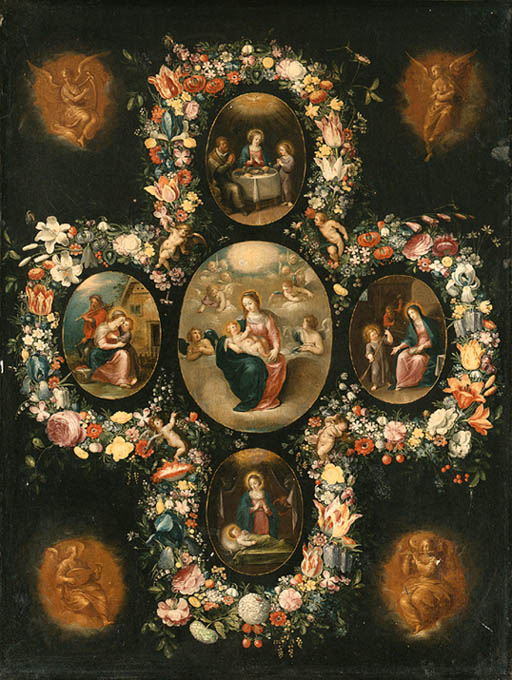
Virgin and Child with Scenes from the Life of Christ

Frans Francken often collaborated with still life specialists such as Andries Daniels, Jan Brueghel the Elder and Younger and Philips de Marlier in the production of garland paintings. Garland paintings are a special type of still life developed in Antwerp by artists such as Jan Brueghel the Elder, Hendrick van Balen, Andries Daniels, Peter Paul Rubens and Daniel Seghers. They typically show a flower garland around a devotional image or portrait. This genre was inspired by the cult of veneration and devotion to Mary prevalent at the Habsburg court (then the rulers over the Habsburg Netherlands) and in Antwerp generally.

Garland paintings were usually collaborations between a still life and a figure painter. In his collaborations on garland paintings Francken would paint the central figure or representation while the still life painter would create the garland. Together with Andries Daniels, Frans Francken further developed the genre of garland paintings, creating many special forms, among them garlands around medallions with the decades of the rosary.

=== Religious works ===
Later in his life Francken also painted large altarpieces. In these works he remained immune to the influence of Rubens, whose work exercised such a strong appeal on Flemish artists of that time. His religious works are more indebted to the work of his father.

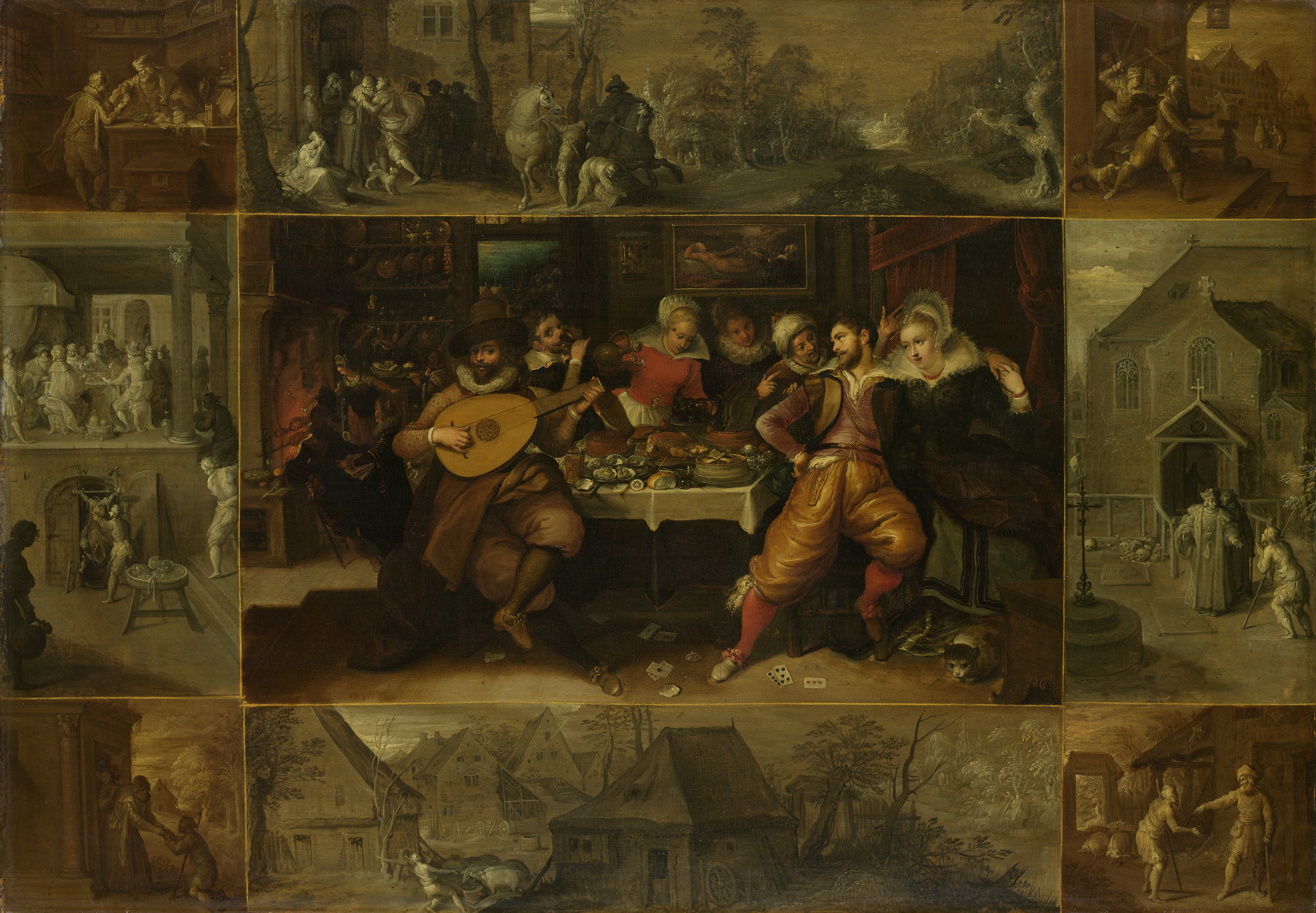
The Parable of the Prodigal Son

Among his religiously themed works of particular note are the unusual and stylistically 'reactionary' paintings of biblical scenes, which are framed on all sides by smaller scenes in grisaille. This type of painting had been introduced by the Antwerp artist Gillis Mostaert in the 16th century. The grisaille frame echoes the Renaissance ecclesiastical portal. Each grisaille scene has its own naturalistic perspective and as a result the compositions provide an odd mixture of three-dimensional naturalism and archaic flatness. Francken used this archaizing technique into the 1620s. This style was possibly invented in the 16th century by the Flemish painter Gillis Mostaert and some works of Mostaert in this style have been erroneously attributed to Frans Francken.

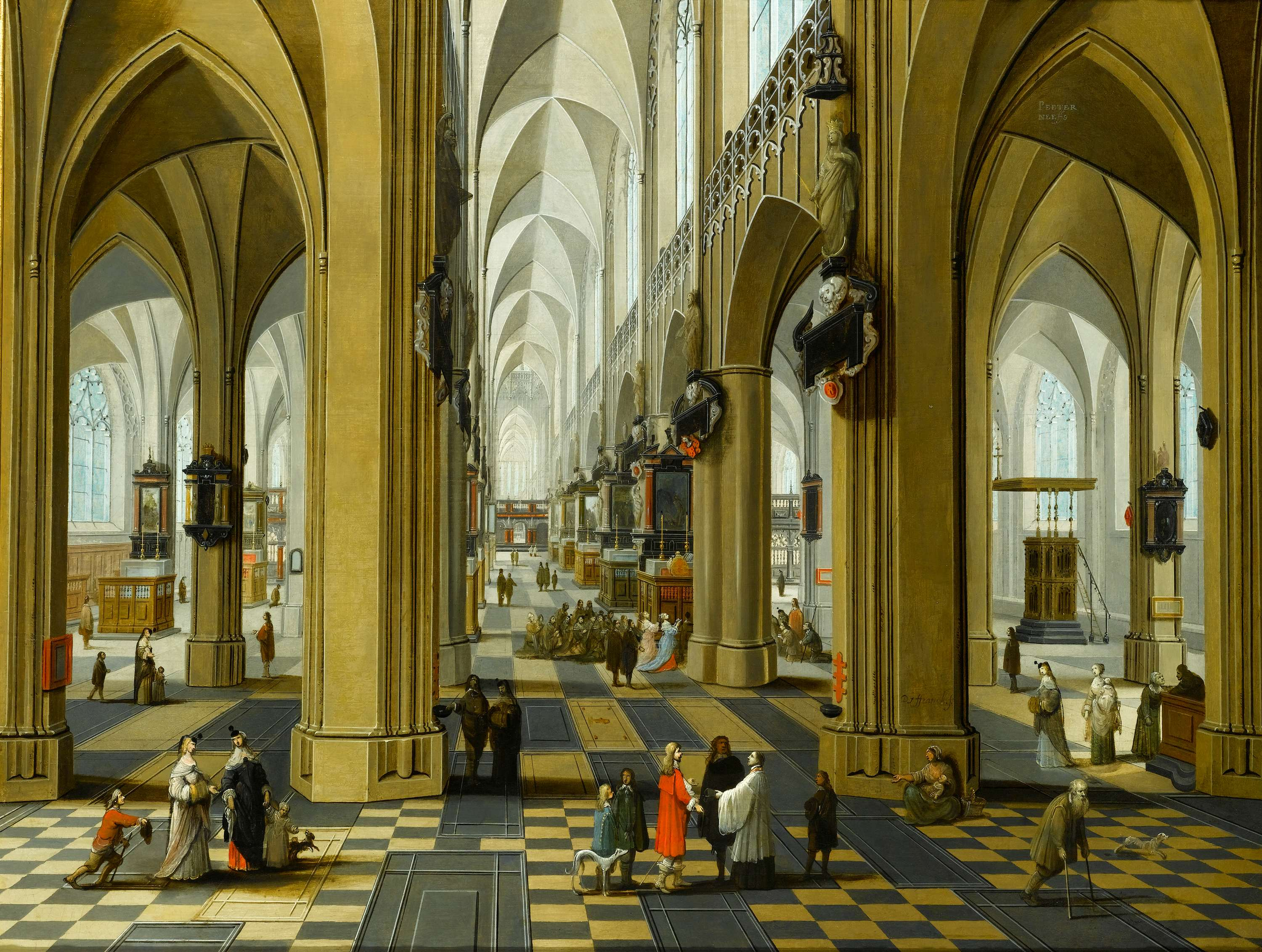
Church Interior, with Pieter Neeffs the Elder

An example of one of these works is The Parable of the Prodigal Son (Rijksmuseum, Amsterdam). The panel shows various scenes from the Parable of the Prodigal Son from the Christian bible. The parable recounts the story of a father with two sons. The younger son asks for his inheritance and after wasting his fortune (the word "prodigal" means "wastefully extravagant"), becomes destitute and has to live in squalor. He returns home with the intention of begging his father to make him one of his hired servants. His father welcomes him back and celebrates his return but the older son refuses to participate. In the centre of the composition Francken depicts the scene of the prodigal son during his wild, high-living days in which he squandered his inheritance.Surrounding this central scene are depicted other scenes of the story in smaller scale and in grisaille.

== Family tree ==
Francken family tree

Nicolaes Francken; 1515–1596
Hieronymus Francken I 1540–1610	Frans Francken I 1542–1616	Ambrosius Francken I 1544–1618	(Cornelius Francken)
Isabella Francken	Thomas Francken; 1574–1625	Hieronymus Francken II; 1578–1623	Frans Francken the Younger; 1581–1642	Ambrosius Francken II; 1590–1632	Hans Francken; 1581–after 1610
Frans Francken III; 1607–1667	Hieronymus Francken III; 1611–after 1661	Ambrosius Francken III; 1614–1662
Constantijn Francken; 1661–1717
