= David Bailly =

Dutch Golden Age painter

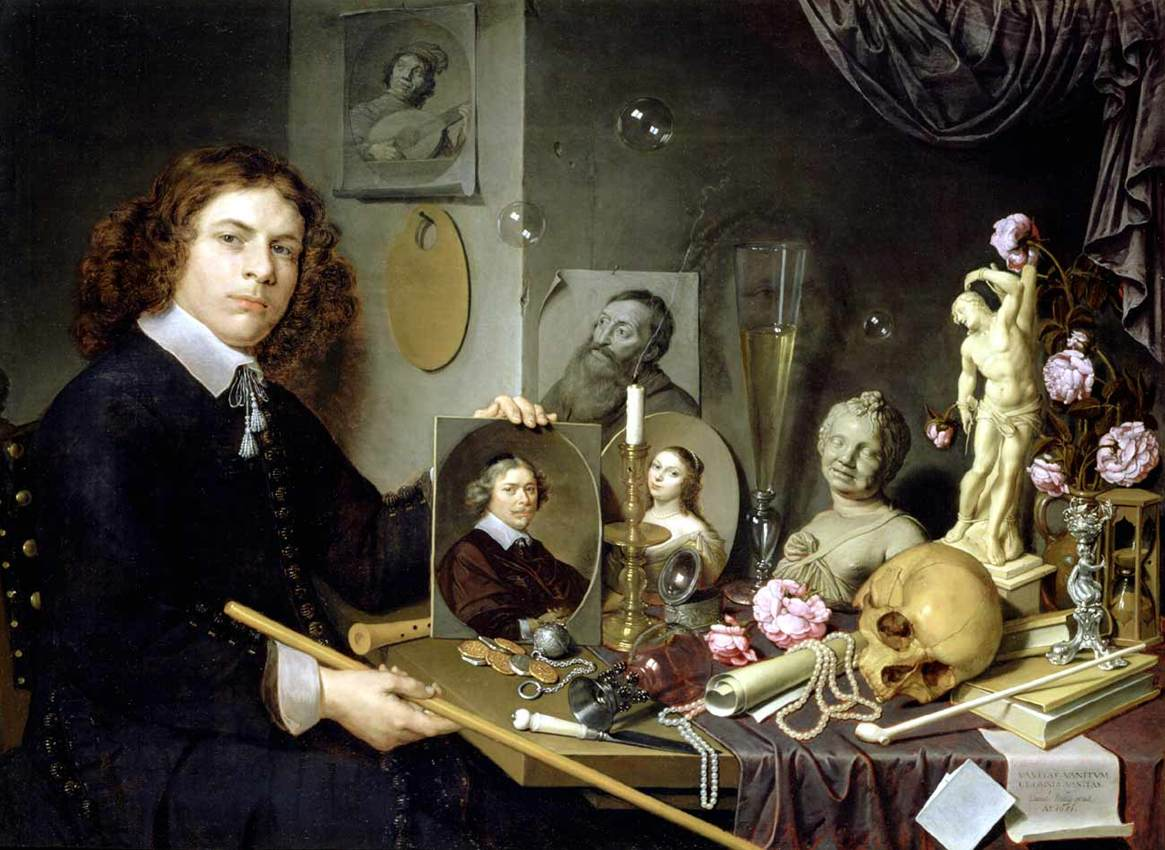
- Self-Portrait with Vanitas Symbols, c. 1651
- Born: 1584; Leiden, Dutch Republic
- Died: 1657 (age 72-73); Leiden, Dutch Republic
- Education: Cornelius van der Voort
- Known for: Painting
- Movement: Dutch Golden Age painting

David Bailly (1584–1657) was a Dutch Golden Age artist known for his still-life paintings, portraits, and self-portraits.

== Biography ==
David Bailly was born in 1584 in Leiden in the Dutch Republic. The son of a Flemish immigrant, calligrapher, and fencing master, Peter Bailly, David studied with his father and artist Jacques de Gheyn II.

Bailly apprenticed with a surgeon-painter Adriaan Verburg in Leiden and then with Cornelius van der Voort, a portrait painter in Amsterdam. According to artist and biographer Arnold Houbraken, in the winter of 1608 Bailly traveled to Frankfurt, Nuremberg, Augsburg Hamburg, and via Tirol to Venice, and from there to Rome. On his return he spent five months in Venice, working as a journeyman where he could, before crossing the Alps again in 1609.

On his return voyage, Bailly worked for several German princes including the Duke of Brunswick. Returning to the Netherlands in 1613, Bailly began painting still-life subjects and portraits, including self-portraits and portraits of his students and professors at the University of Leiden. Among these portraits is the image of fencing master Gerard Thibault used for the engraving in the front of his famous work on using the rapier.

Bailly is known for his vanitas paintings that suggest the transience of life with ephemeral symbols like flowers, candles, musical instruments, skulls, and bubbles. In 1648, Bailly became the head of the Leiden Guild of St. Luke.

He also taught his nephews Harmen and Pieter Steenwijck to paint.
