= Harmen Steenwijck =

Dutch painter

- Born: c. 1612; Delft NL
- Died: 1656 (aged 43–44); Leiden
- Education: David Bailly
- Known for: Vanitas
- Notable work: Still life: An Allegory of the Vanities of Human Life
- Style: Realism (arts)
- Movement: Memento mori
- Family: Brother Pieter Steenwijck

Harmen Steenwijck or Harmen Steenwyck (c. 1612 – after 1656) was a Dutch Golden Age painter who specialised in still life painting, especially in the style of Dutch vanitas.

== Early life ==
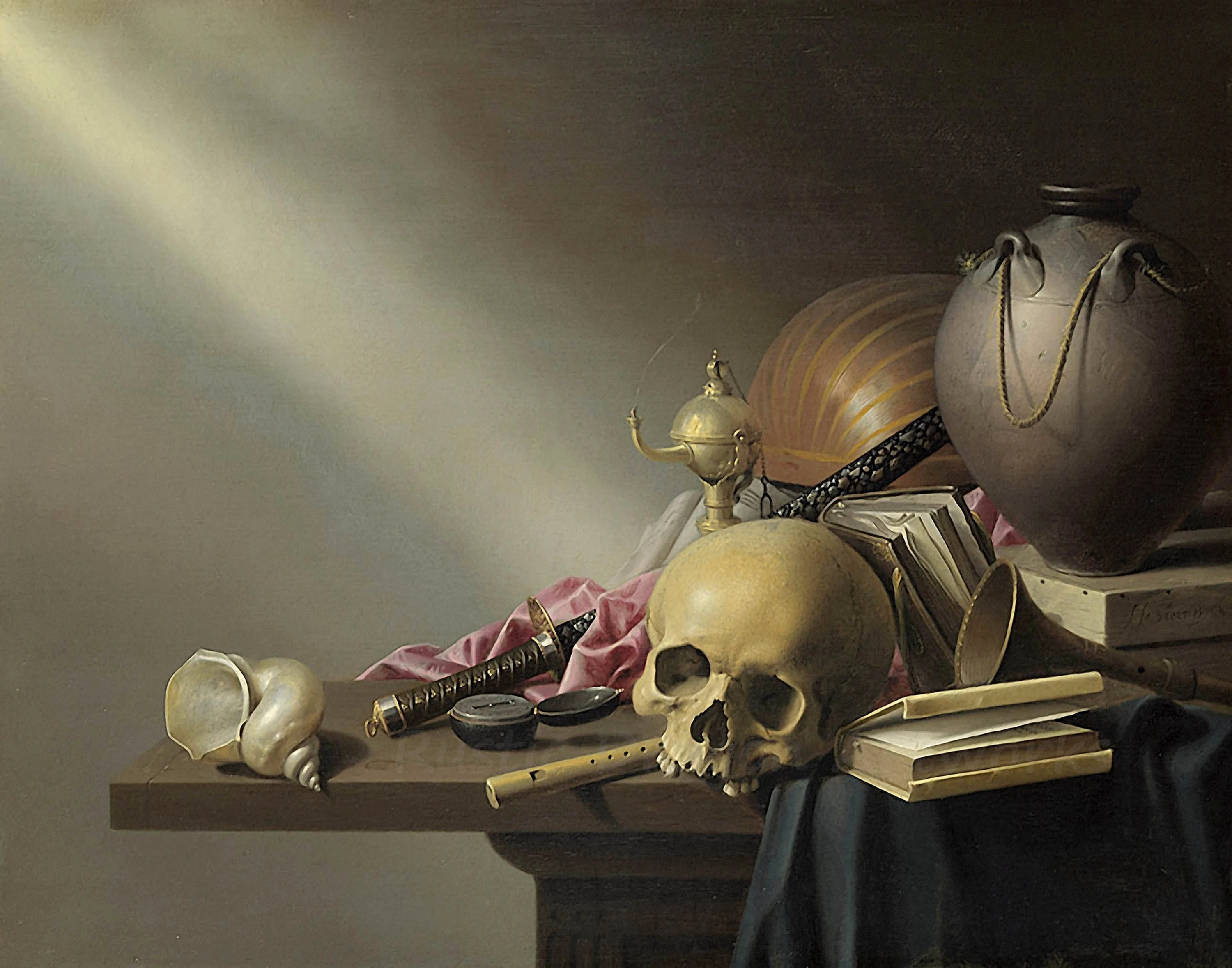
Still life: An Allegory of the Vanities of Human Life

Steenwyck was born in Delft, c. 1612. He was the brother of Pieter Steenwijck, also a still-life painter. His father was Evert Hamenz who was an eyeglass maker. In 1628 he moved to Leiden to live and study with his uncle. He and his brother were taught to paint by their uncle David Bailly in Leiden. Baily is credited with inventing the vanitas genre and he influenced Steenwyck to paint in the vanitas genre. The exact of his paintings are not known because he did not date his paintings.

== Career ==
Harmen became active as a painter in Leiden between 1628 and 1633. Not much is known about his life but it was in Leiden that he began to paint in the vanitas genre. His formula for his paintings was to stage objects in a diagonal or triangle arrangement on a table.

Steenwijck is best known for his painting which was done in the Dutch vanitas genre: Still Life: An Allegory of the Vanities of Human Life. He painted the image in Leiden c. 1640. It is in the collection of the National Gallery, London.
