= Frans Wouters =

Flemish painter (1612–1659)

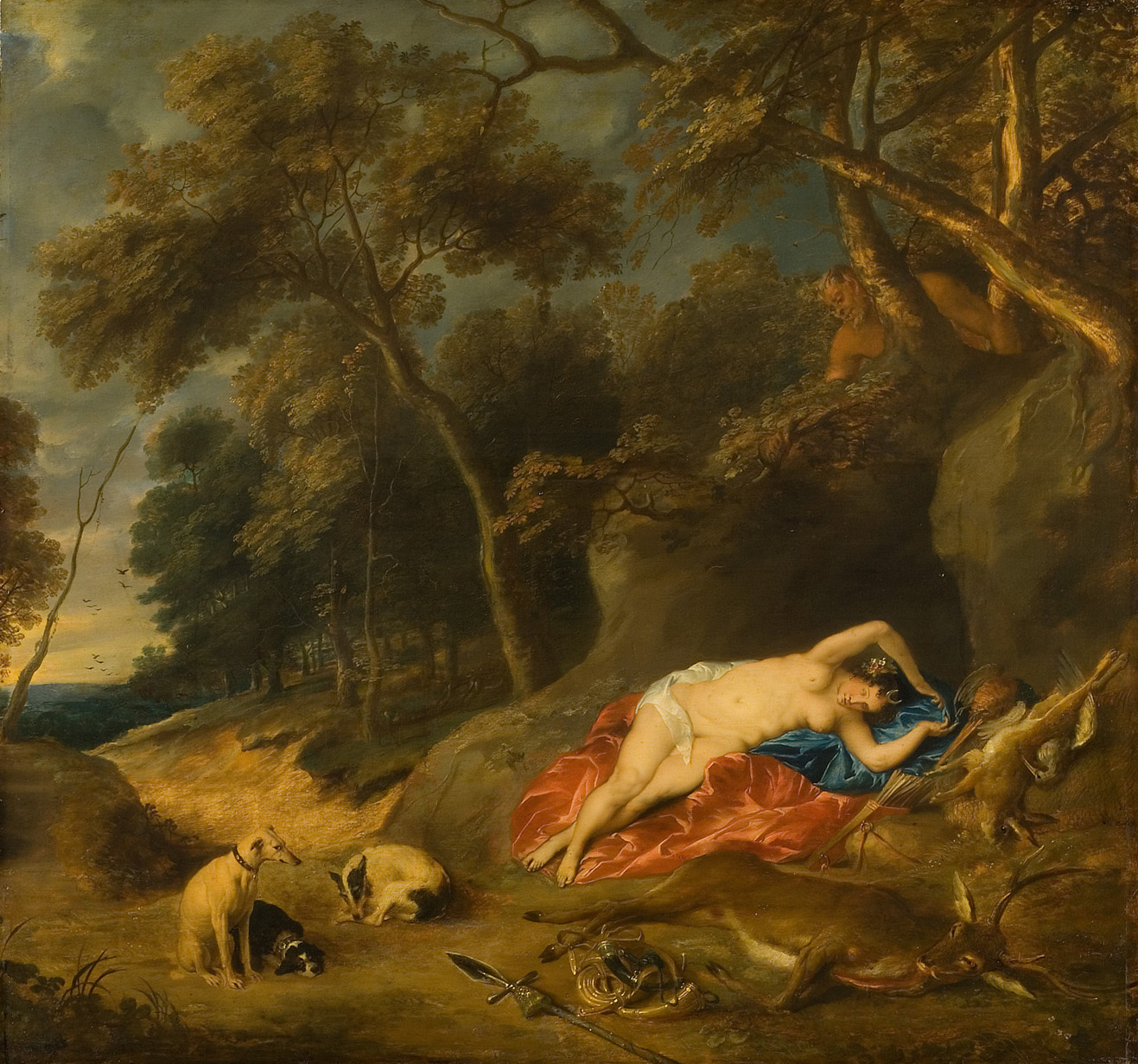
Diana resting in a landscape

Frans Wouters (1612–1659) was a Flemish Baroque painter who translated the monumental Baroque style of Peter Paul Rubens into the small context of cabinet paintings. He was a court painter to the Roman Emperor and the Prince of Wales and was active as an ambassador and art dealer.

== Life ==
Frans Wouters was born in Lier, present-day Belgium. He was first apprenticed to Pieter van Avont in Antwerp in 1629 but broke his contract to move to the workshop of Rubens in 1634. He became a master in the Guild of St. Luke the following year. He assisted Rubens in 1635 in the decorations for the Joyous Entry into Antwerp of the Cardinal-Infante Ferdinand of Austria in 1635. Rubens had the overall management of this decorative project which was realized with the assistance of a large number of Antwerp painters such as Jacob Jordaens, Cornelis de Vos, Jan Cossiers, Peter Snayers, Thomas Willeboirts Bosschaert, Theodoor van Thulden, Jan Boeckhorst, Peeter Symons, Jacob Peter Gowy and others, who worked after Rubens' modellos.

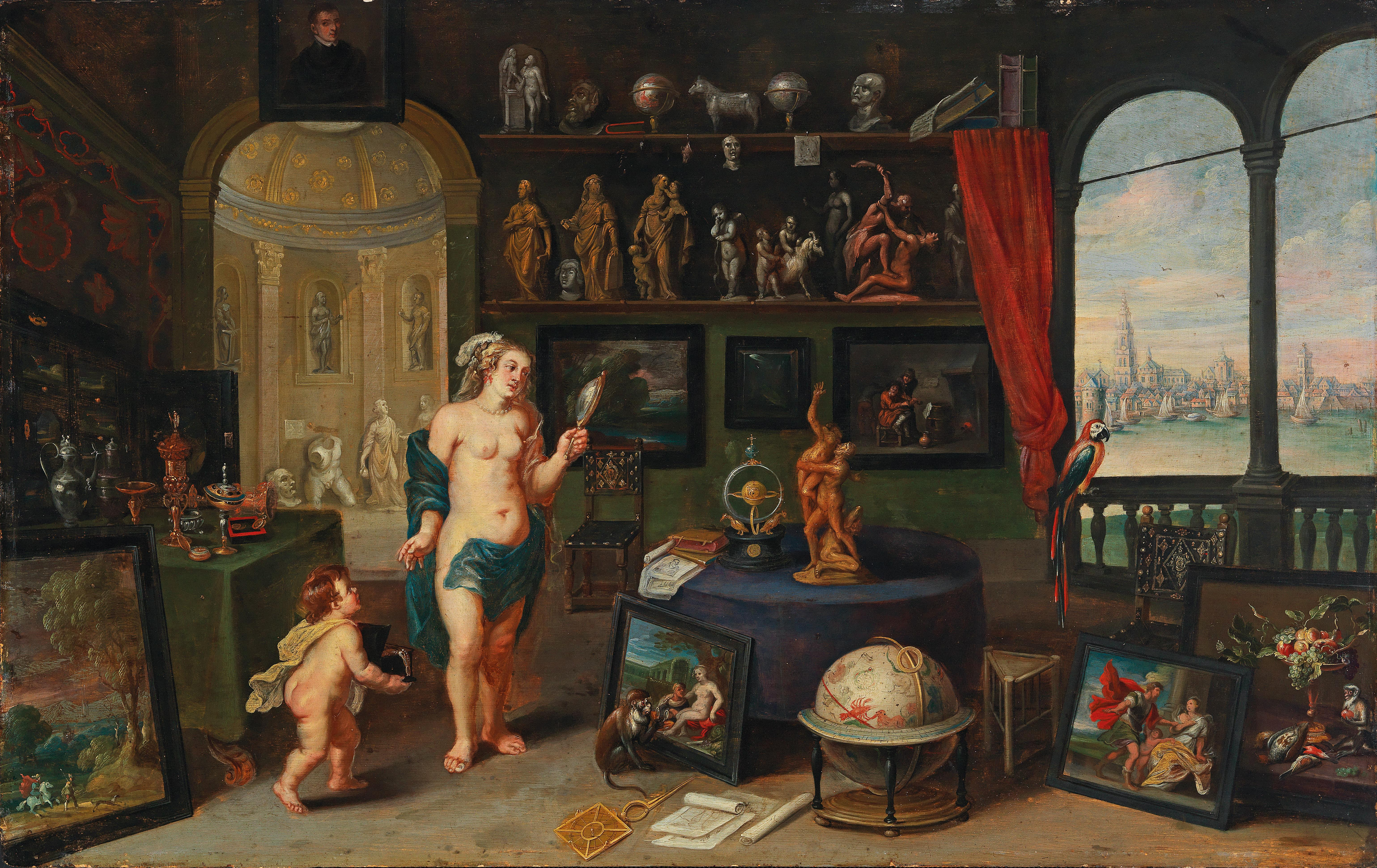
Allegory of sight

He spent the 1630s as court painter to Holy Roman Emperor Ferdinand II. He was sent as an ambassador of Ferdinand II to England in 1637. The following year, he became the painter of the Prince of Wales, the future Charles II of England. In England, Wouters would certainly have had the opportunity to meet his compatriot Anthony van Dyck, who was at that time the court painter of Charles I of England. Even after his return to Antwerp in 1641 he remained in contact with Charles II during the period of the English Civil War and the Commonwealth. He was described in 1658 as Charles's 'ayuda de cámera' (chamberlain).

In Antwerp he collaborated again with his former master Pieter van Avont mainly adding landscapes to van Avont's compositions. He became involved in the art market. In this capacity he assisted in the valuation of the paintings in Rubens' estate. His marriage to Maria Doncker, daughter of the treasurer of Antwerp, in 1644 provided him with a substantial fortune. In 1648, he became dean of the Antwerp Guild of St. Luke. He was involved in the sale of the art collection of George Villiers, 1st Duke of Buckingham by the English Parliamentary Commissioners in 1648. At around this time Wouters began to work for Archduke Leopold Wilhelm of Austria, the then Governor of the Southern Netherlands and an avid art patron and collector.

== Work ==
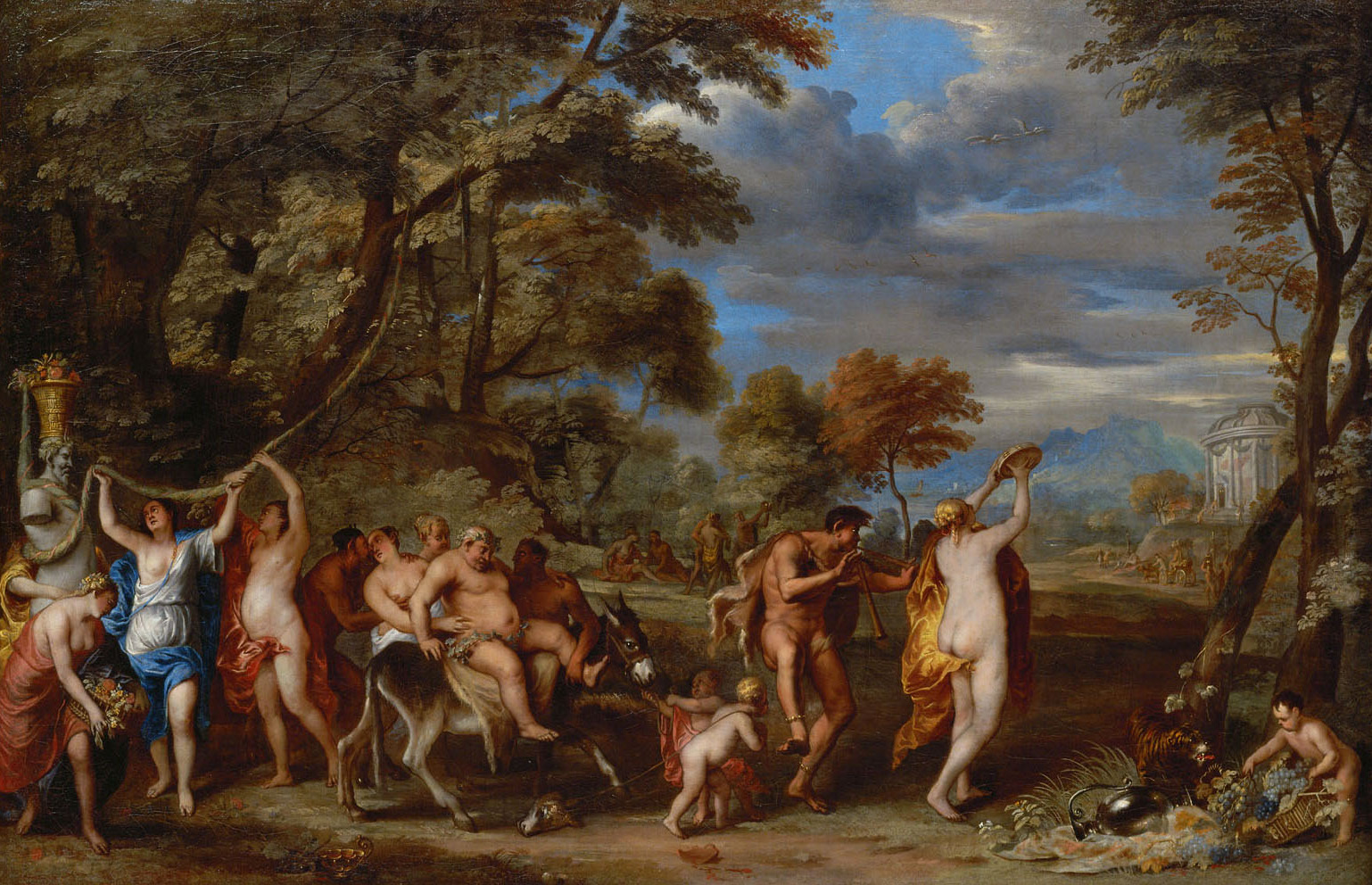
Bacchanal

Wouters' style and subject matter reflect the taste of his international aristocratic clients who preferred small paintings, decorative landscapes and mythological stories. Other themes appreciated by these patrons were scenes dealing with alchemy, the four elements, Allegories of the Five Senses as well as iconographical themes that allowed for different levels of interpretation based on a number of references and allusions, or devices such as the 'picture within a picture'. An example is the Allegory of sight (Auctioned at Dorotheum on 19 April 2016 in Vienna, lot 29) where the sense of sight is represented primarily by the woman regarding herself in the mirror. This act also alludes to another theme, that of vanity, which is further evoked by the still life painting on the right. The room with its variety of precious objects, scientific instruments, paintings and sculptures has taken the semblance of a 'cabinet of curiosities. The multitude of objects refers to the various forms of visual perception and man's desire to take possession of the things he sees by understanding them. The world map in the foreground further alludes to man's ability to observe and understand distant worlds. In contrast, the monkey in the foreground of the painting is only capable of achieving the lowest, most superficial level of seeing, the staring at things without genuine understanding. Even the use of two pairs of spectacles does not help the poor animal.

His style bore initially a resemblance to the late Mannerism of Joos de Momper and was later influenced by Rubens and in particular Rubens' landscape paintings. After entering the service of Archduke Leopold William, Wouters' work demonstrated the increased influence of Anthony van Dyck and the human figures in his paintings became elongated and emotionally expressive. He painted biblical scenes and mythological landscapes in this style.
