= Jan Baptist Borrekens =

Flemish painter (1611-1675)

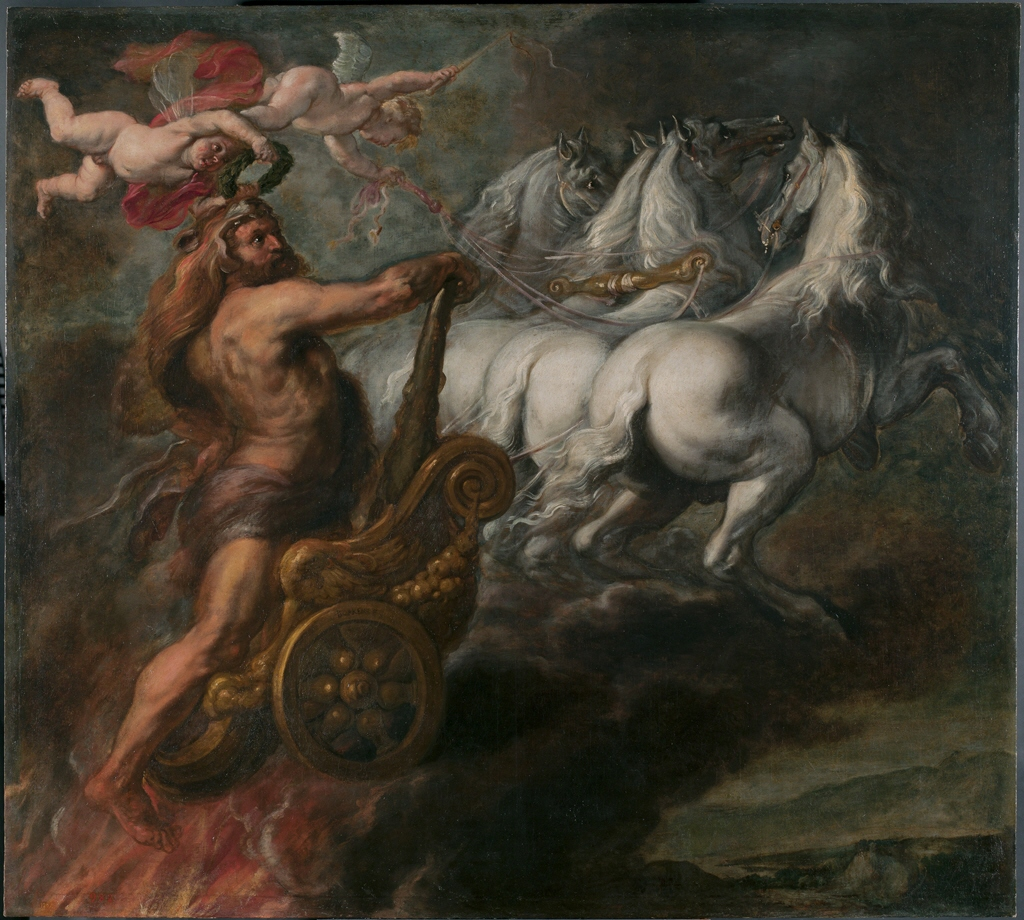
The apotheosis of Hercules

Jan Baptist Borrekens or Jan Baptist Borkens (17 May 1611 – 23 February 1675) was a Flemish painter and art dealer. He was a history painter and is known to have collaborated with Peter Paul Rubens.

== Life ==
Jan Baptist Borrekens was born in Antwerp. His brother Mattheus later became a prominent print maker. It is not known with whom Borrekens trained. It is possible he trained in the workshop of Rubens, which would explain why he was not mentioned as a pupil in the records of the Antwerp Guild of Saint Luke. Rubens was exempted from membership of the Antwerp Guild of Saint Luke as he was a court painter.

Borrekens became a master of the Antwerp Guild of Saint Luke in the Guild year 1629–1630. In 1631 he joined the Society of the Aged Bachelors (Sodaliteit der Bejaarde Jongmans), a fraternity for bachelors established by the Jesuit order. In 1634 he received Gillis Bollaert as his pupil.

On 30 January 1636 he married Catharina Breugel, the daughter of the famous painter Jan Brueghel the Elder. Peter Paul Rubens was one of the witnesses at the wedding as he was the guardian of the bride. As a result of the marriage Borrekens became the brother in law of the prominent painter David Teniers the Younger who was the husband of a sister of his wife. Borrekens and Teniers did not get along and at some point Borrekens reported Teniers to the authorities on the ground that Teniers was passing himself off as an aristocrat and was using a coat of arms. As a result of this report Teniers was prohibited from using the coat of arms.

Borrekens and his wife had two daughters and one son. His wife died on 4 December 1654. The artist remarried on 7 December 1656 to the 27-year old Anna Maria van Ginderdeuren. His second wife died on 20 September 1659.

Borrekens was active as an art dealer and accumulated important assets. He was an art collector who owned many paintings of prominent Flemish masters of the 17th century as well as tapestries.

He died in Antwerp on 13 February 1675.

== Work ==
Only very few works have been ascribed to Borrekens. He seems to have been active more as an art dealer than as an artist.

He collaborated with Rubens in the mid-1630s. Rubens received in 1636 a commission from the Spanish king Philip IV of Spain to create a series of mythological paintings to decorate the Torre de la Parada, a hunting lodge of the king near Madrid. The mythological scenes depicted in the series were largely based on the Metamorphoses of Ovid. Rubens realized this important commission with the assistance of a large number of Antwerp painters such as Jacob Jordaens, Cornelis de Vos, Jan Cossiers, Peter Snayers, Thomas Willeboirts Bosschaert, Theodoor van Thulden, Jan Boeckhorst, Peeter Symons, Jacob Peter Gowy and others, who worked after Rubens' designs. Borrekens was also involved in this project as a collaborator. The canvas which Borrekens created after a design by Rubens represents The apotheosis of Hercules and was in the collection of the Museo del Prado in Madrid before it was donated to the Fine Arts Museum of Coruña. This is the only known painting by Borrekens.
