= Jacob Peter Gowy =

Flemish Baroque painter

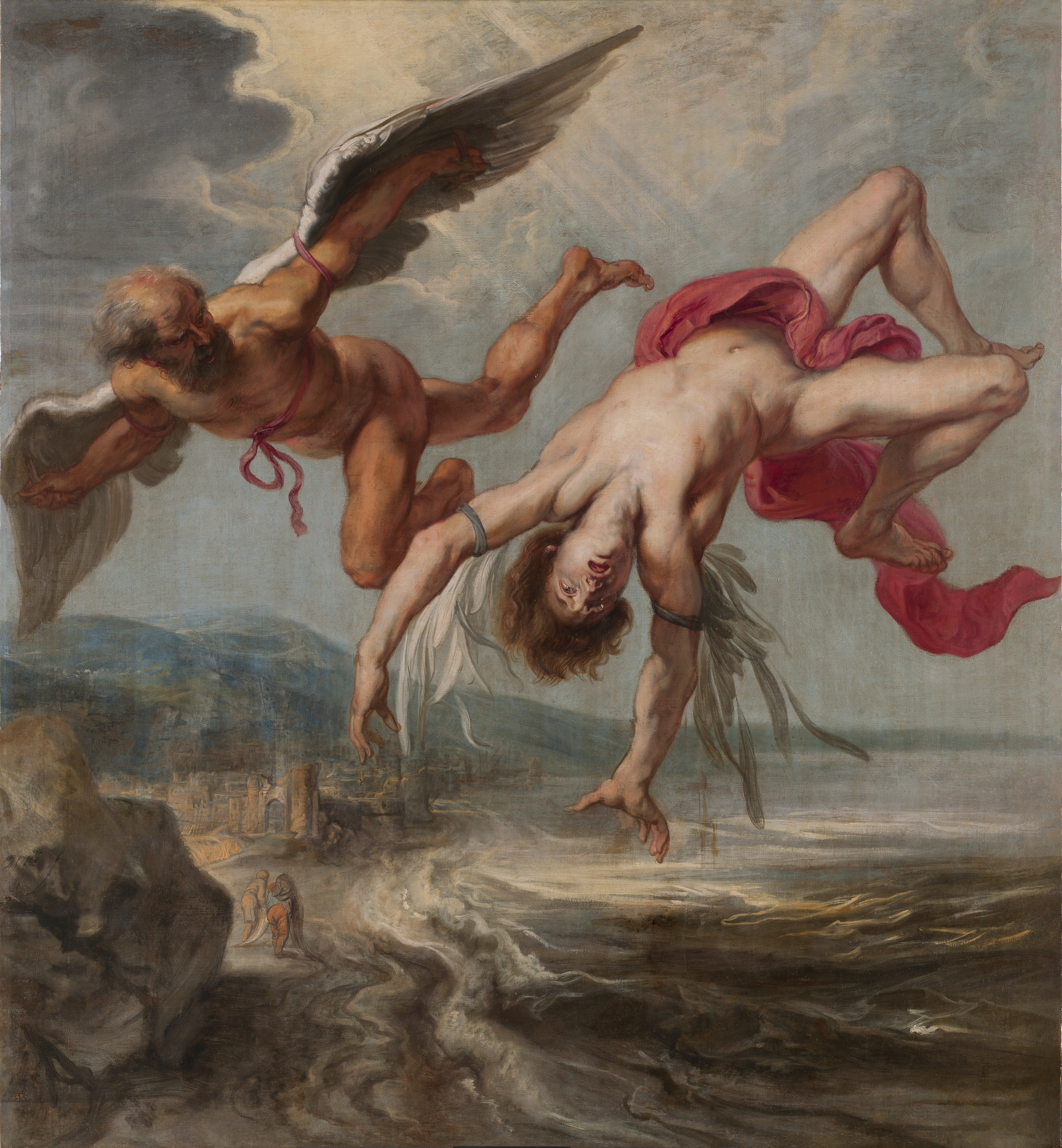
The Fall of Icarus

Jacob Peter Gouwy or Jacob Peter Gowy (c. 1610 – after 1644 and before 1664) was a Flemish Baroque painter of history paintings and portraits. He collaborated with Peter Paul Rubens and spent time in England where he was active as a portrait painter. As the creator of a large picture of a horse painted in England he can be considered one of the pioneers of the genre of portraits of horses.

== Life ==
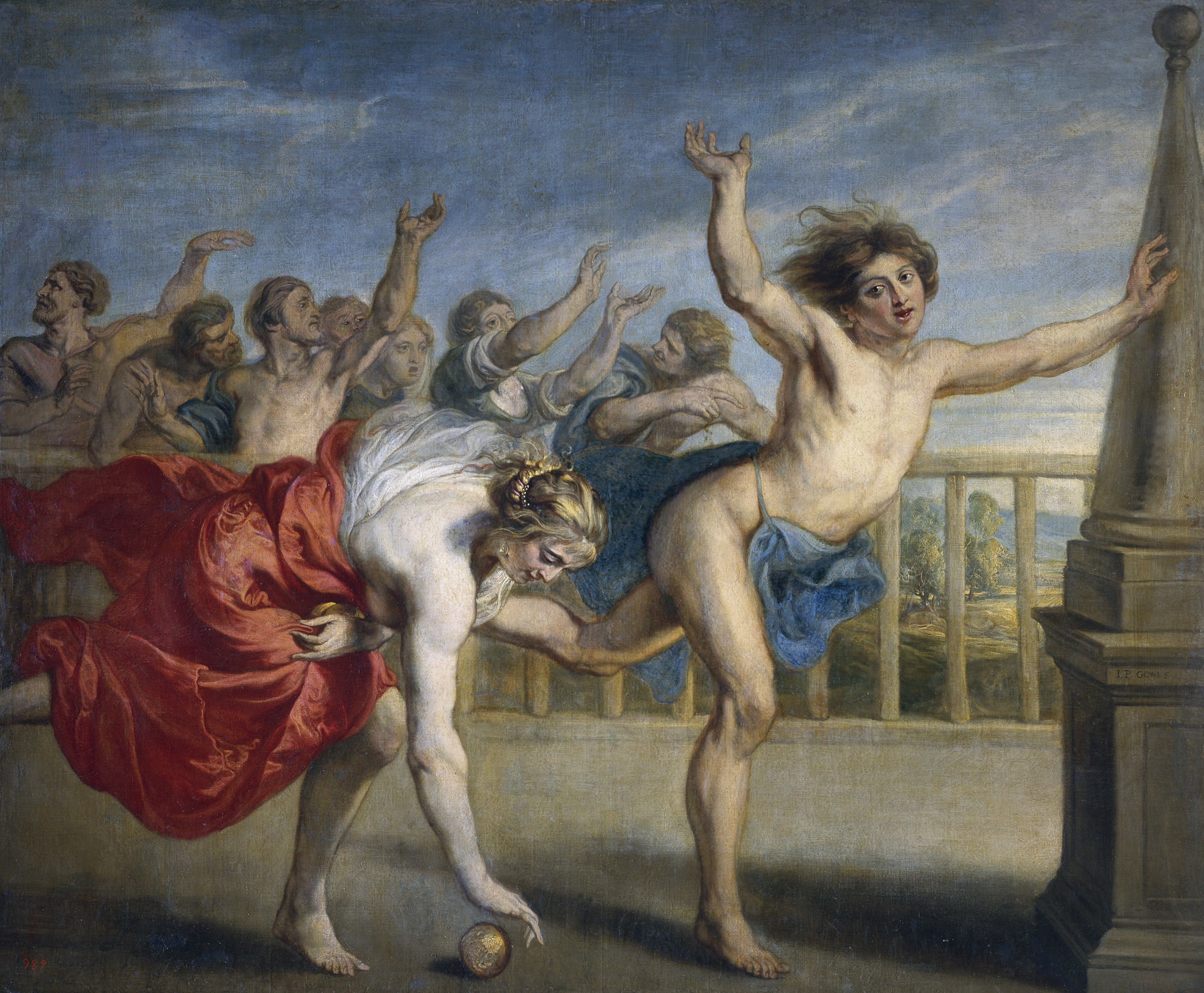
Hippomenes and Atalanta

Little is known about the life and career of Jacob Peter Gouwy. He was a disciple of Paul van Overbeeck in Antwerp. He was registered as an apprentice in the records of the Antwerp Guild of Saint Luke in the Guild year 1632–33. He became a master of the Antwerp Guild in the Guild year 1636–37.

Gouwy travelled to England but the date of this trip is unknown. He seems to have worked there as a portrait painter. According to some sources, he lived in his later years in retirement in Antwerp, as a priest of the St Walburga Church in Antwerp.

It is not clear when or where he died but it is believed he died after 1644 and before 1664.

== Work ==
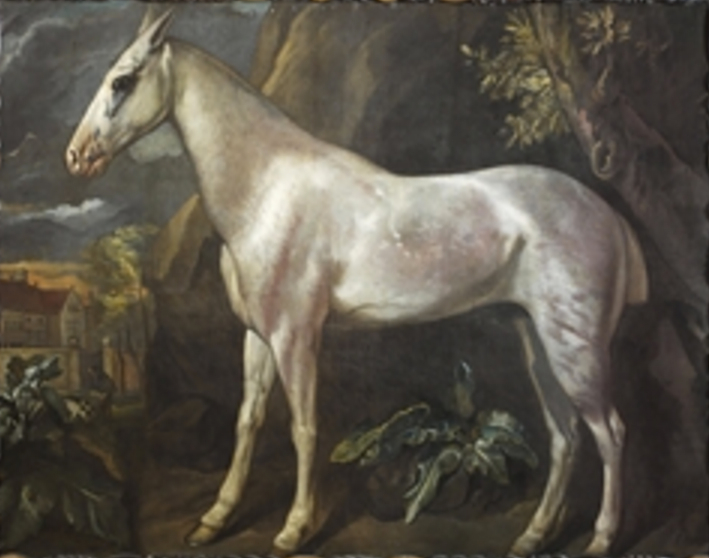
The Marquess of Worcester's dappled grey stallion

Only very few works have been ascribed to Gouwy. He seems to have been active mainly as a history painter and portrait artist.

He collaborated with Rubens in the mid-1630s. Rubens received in 1636 a commission from the Spanish king Philip IV of Spain to create a series of mythological paintings to decorate the Torre de la Parada, a hunting lodge of the king near Madrid. The mythological scenes depicted in the series were largely based on the Metamorphoses of Ovid. Rubens realized this important commission with the assistance of a large number of Antwerp painters such as Jacob Jordaens, Cornelis de Vos, Jan Cossiers, Peter Snayers, Thomas Willeboirts Bosschaert, Theodoor van Thulden, Jan Boeckhorst, Peeter Symons, Jan Baptist Borrekens and others, who worked after Rubens' designs. Gouwy was also involved in this project as a collaborator. Two of the canvases which Gouwy created after designs by Rubens, one representing The Fall of Icarus and the other Hippomenes and Atalanta, are in the collection of the Museo del Prado in Madrid. A comparison with Rubens' original designs shows that the artist only made minor modifications to these designs.

In England Gouwy seems to have worked as a portrait painter. Wenceslaus Hollar, the prominent Bohemian printmaker who was then working in England, etched three of Gouwy's portraits in 1644, portraying respectively Johannes Henry van Craenhals, the Hungarian alchemist Johannes Banfi Hunyades and John Thompson. Gouwy also painted Thomas Wood, Bishop of Lichfield and Coventry (Oxford, Christ Church College), as well as a portrait of an unknown man (c. 1645 to 1650, formerly at Wilton Castle). His portraits appear to be closer to the aesthetics of Anthony van Dyck than that of Rubens.

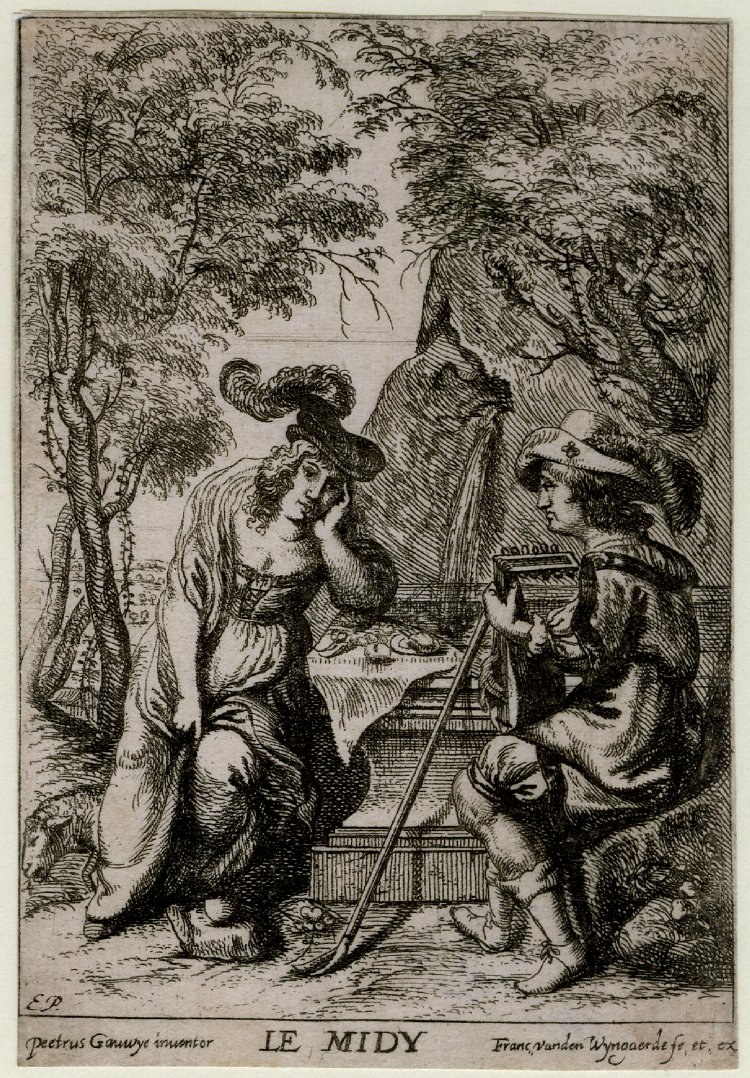
Noon from the Four Times of the Day

While in England, Gouwy painted one of the earliest portraits of a horse ever created in England, preceded only by the large painting of a grey horse at Hatfield Hall, dated 1594. Gouwy's painting, signed and dated 1647, is believed to represent the Marquess of Worcester's dappled grey stallion (at Christie's on 22 May 2008, London, lot 250). The horse is the main subject of the composition, which can therefore legitimately be called a 'horse portrait'. In the immediate foreground stands the unsaddled horse, which dominates the composition. Worcester House is depicted in the background. The picture likely had an important influence on the history of British sporting art. John Wootton was in his youth a page to Lady Anne Somerset, daughter of the 1st Duke of Beaufort and wife of Thomas, 2nd Earl of Coventry. The Beauforts later encouraged Wootton to pursue painting, and it is likely that Wootton saw Gouwy's picture in their collection. The early exposure to a monumental example of horse painting likely gave Wootton a sense of the possibilities of the field that made him one of the most vigorous and daring of its exponents.

Around 1630–1645, Gouwy provided the design for one of the prints for Frans van den Wyngaerde's series of four prints on the Four times of the day (Quatre heures du jour). His design representing Noon depicts an outdoor scene with a lady staring melancholically into the distance while a gentleman plays a guitar.
