= Peeter Symons =

Flemish painter

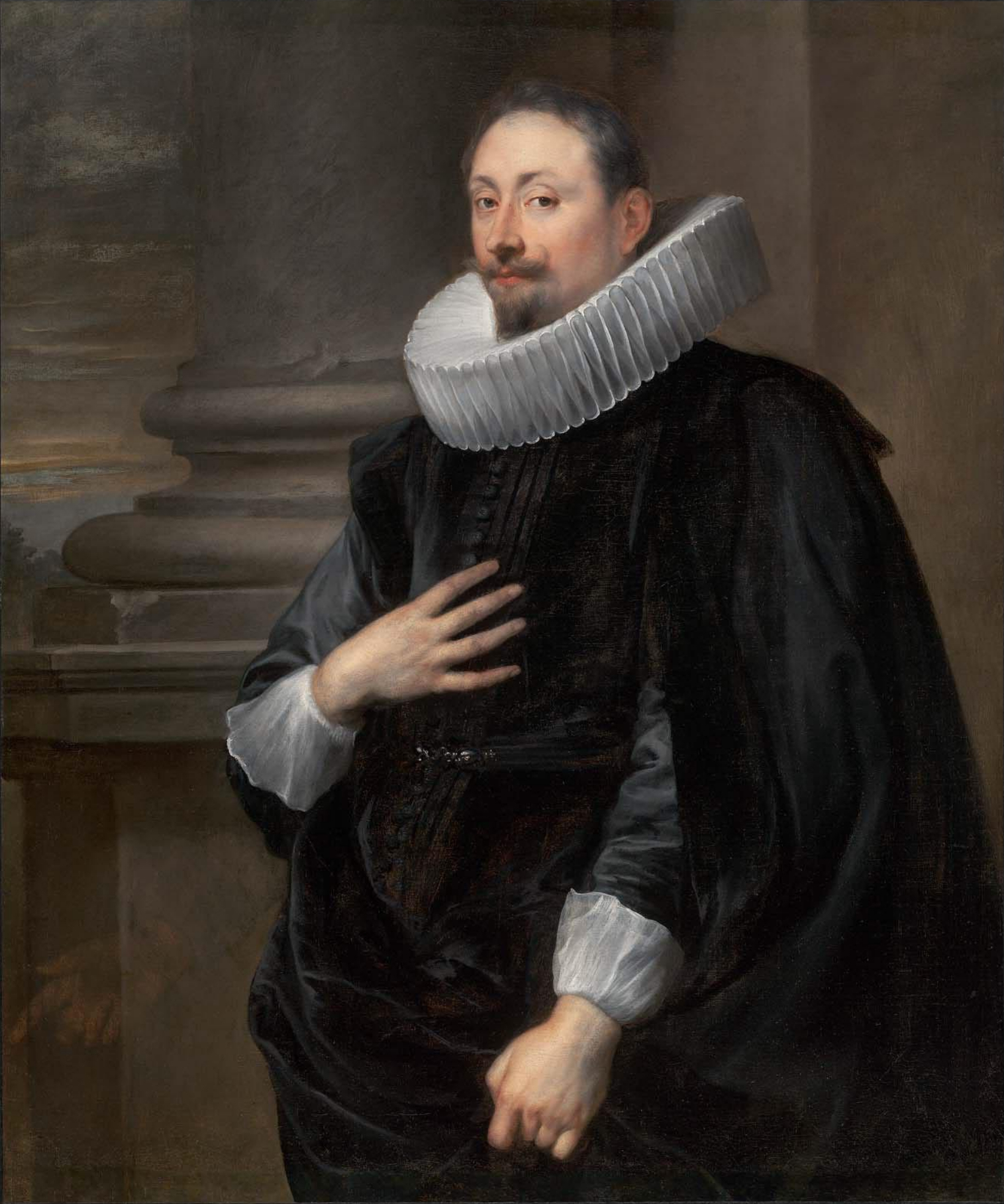
Portrait of Peeter Symons by Anthony van Dyck

Peeter Symons or Peeter Simons (fl 1629–1636) was a Flemish painter only known for his collaboration with Rubens in 1636 on the commission from the Spanish king Philip IV of Spain to create a series of mythological paintings to decorate the Torre de la Parada, a hunting lodge of the king near Madrid.

== Life ==
Very little is known about the life of Peeter Symons. He was possibly the son of Michiel Simons the Elder. He was registered in 1629 in the Guild of Saint Luke of Antwerp as the son of a master. He received various pupils including Michel de Rudder, Balthasar Willebeeck and Daniel Verbraken. In the Guild year 1636-1637 he was recorded for the last time as a master of the Guild.

Anthony van Dyck painted a portrait of Peeter Symons (Museum of Fine Arts, Boston) around 1630–1632. The portrait was made to be engraved and included in van Dyck's Iconography (Icones Principum Virorum), a collection of engraved portraits of leading personalities of van Dyck's time. The painting was engraved by possibly Jacobus de Han. The inclusion of Symons in this project of van Dyck demonstrates that Symons was held in high esteem by his fellow artists.

== Work ==
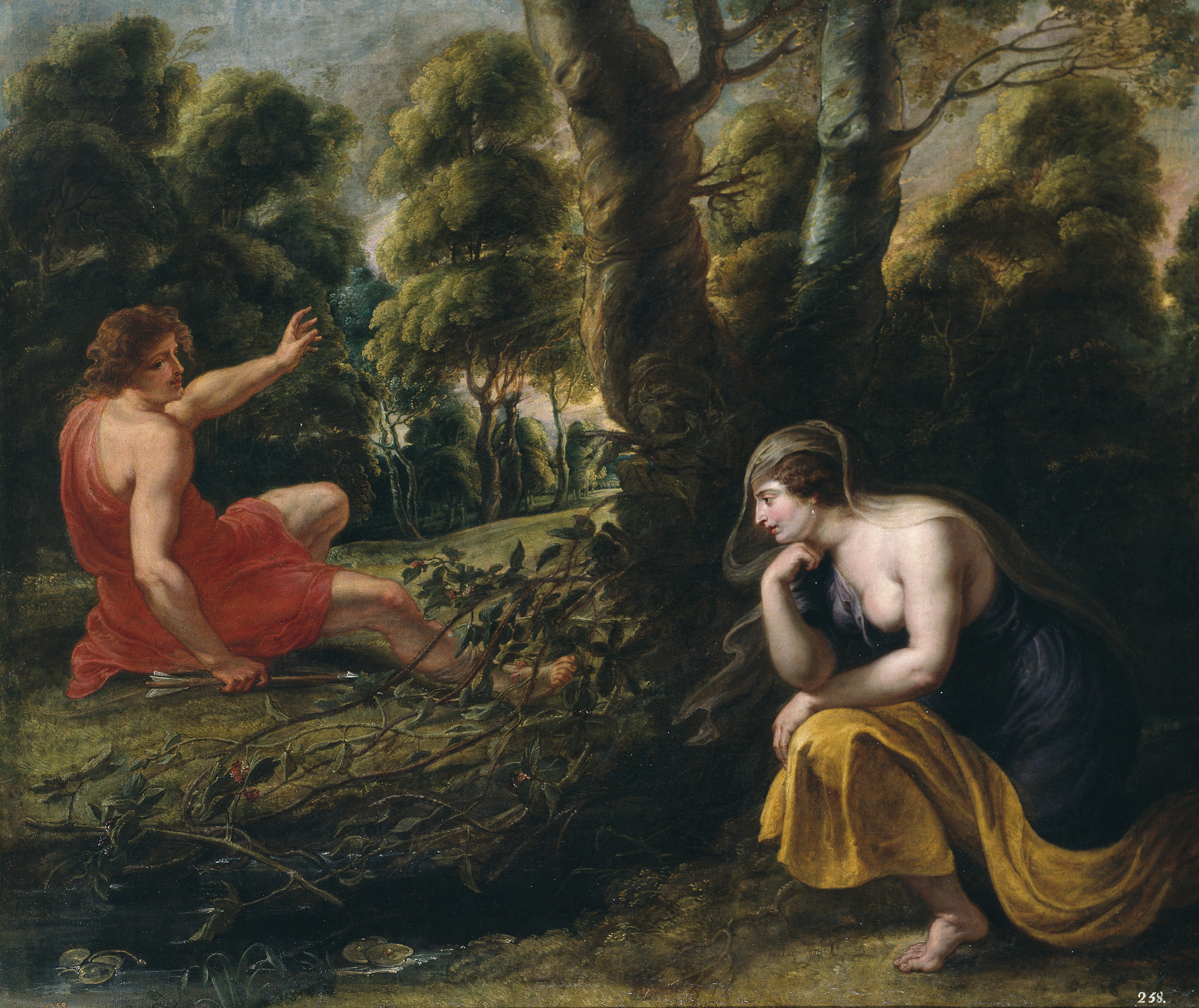
Cephalus and Procris

The work of Peeter Symons is virtually unknown. An inventory of 1644 mentions a painting of a fish by Symons, which could be an indication that the artist painted still lifes.

Symons collaborated with Rubens in the mid-1630s. Rubens received in 1636 a commission from the Spanish king Philip IV of Spain to create a series of mythological paintings to decorate the Torre de la Parada, a hunting lodge of the king near Madrid. The mythological scenes depicted in the series were largely based on the Metamorphoses of Ovid. Rubens realized this important commission with the assistance of a large number of Antwerp painters such as Jacob Jordaens, Cornelis de Vos, Jan Cossiers, Peter Snayers, Thomas Willeboirts Bosschaert, Theodoor van Thulden, Jan Boeckhorst, Jacob Peter Gowy, Jan Baptist Borrekens and others, who worked after Rubens' designs. Peeter Symons was also involved in this project as a collaborator. Two of the canvases which Symons created after designs by Rubens for this project are recorded. One representing Cephalus and Procris (Museo del Prado, Madrid) is based on a sketch by Rubens also in the collection of the Museo del Prado in Madrid. This painting shows his formal dependence on Rubens, although Symons never achieved in his works the freshness of the master, since his figures are much more rigid and lack the dramatic tension of Rubens. A second canvas painted for the Torre de la Parada representing Neptune and a nymph is documented but now considered lost.
