= Peter Snayers =

Flemish painter (1592–1667)

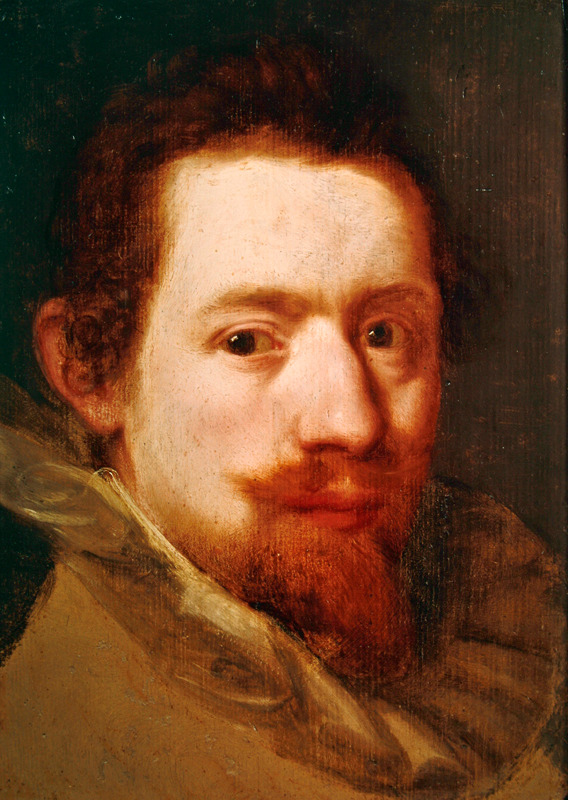
Portrait of Peter Snayers by Rubens, c. 1626

Peter Snayers or Pieter Snayers (1592–1667) was a Flemish painter known for his panoramic battle scenes, depictions of cavalry skirmishes, attacks on villages, coaches and convoys and hunting scenes. He established his reputation mainly through his topographic battle scenes providing a bird's eye view over the battlefield. He further painted large landscapes and portraits of the aristocracy. He was a regular collaborator of local landscape painters and also Rubens.

After starting his career in Antwerp, he moved to Brussels where he worked for the court. He was the principal military iconographer of the court in Brussels and the appointed court painter with the rank of lieutenant-colonel.

== Life ==
Snayers was born in Antwerp, where he was baptized on 24 November 1592. His father Lodewijk was the city messenger of Antwerp for Brussels. His mother was Catharina Gijsberts. His oldest brother, also called Lodewijk, became a successful merchant with an extensive international network of contacts. Another brother called Eduard would become a master painter in 1617 and was also a merchant. In 1611 Peter joined the Sodaliteit der Bejaarde Jongmans (Society of the Bachelors of Age), a fraternity for bachelors established in Antwerp by the Jesuit order. This Society's membership consisted principally of citizens from the elite and wealthy middle classes including artists and merchants. Through his membership of the Society, Peter was able to access an important network of contacts which would help boost his career. He was enrolled as a pupil of Sebastiaen Vrancx in Antwerp's Guild of St. Luke in 1612. Sebastiaen Vrancx was a prominent battle and genre painter. In 1613, Snayers was registered as a master painter in the Guild.

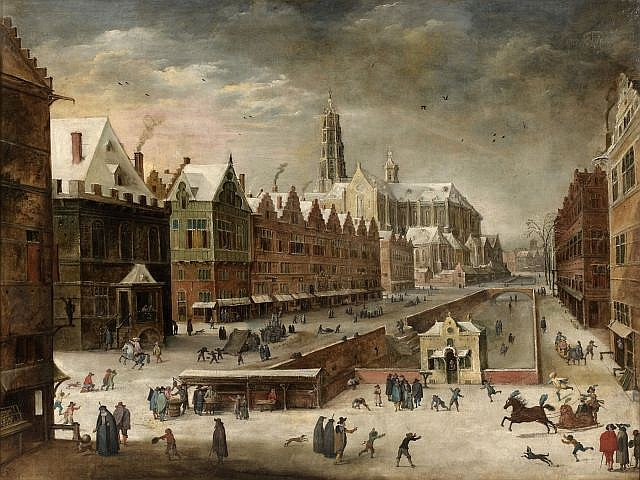
View of a city canal in winter with figures, presumably in Antwerp with Joos de Momper

In 1618, Snayers married Anna Schut, a cousin of the painter Cornelis Schut. Their first child Cornelis was baptized on 8 September 1620. Snayers achieved success as an artist. In Antwerp, the family lived in luxury and Snayers participated annually in the lavish banquet of the chamber of rhetoric Violieren.

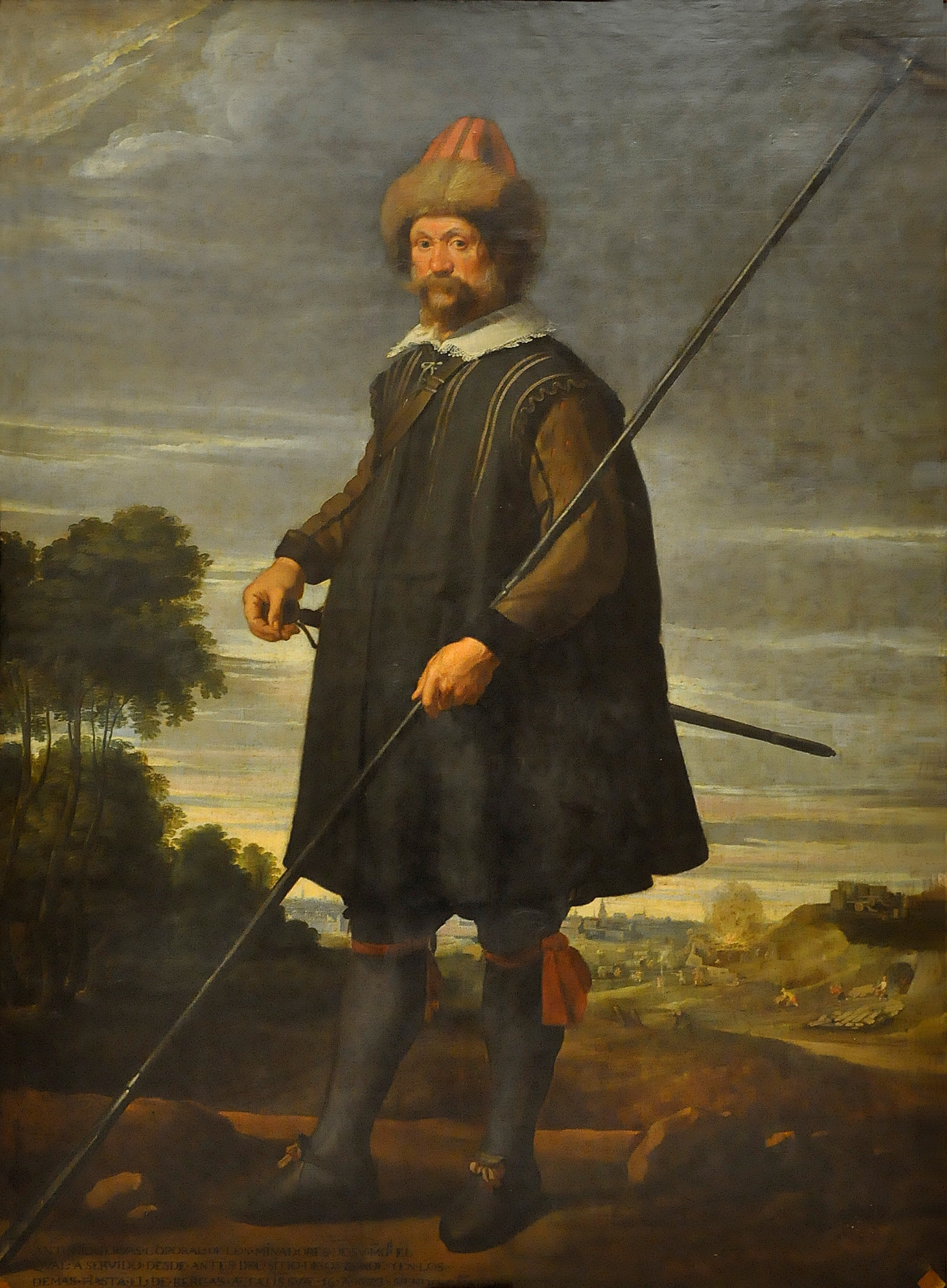
Portrait of sapper corporal Antonio Servás Real Academia de Bellas Artes de San Fernando, Madrid.

Snayers joined the painters' guild in Brussels on 16 June 1628. He became a citizen of Brussels at the same time. It is believed he had been working for the Archduke Albert (died in 1621) while living in Antwerp. He had been appointed court painter and 'domesticq van 't Hof" (domestic of the court) by the Archduke. Snayers likely moved to Brussels in order to pursue opportunities at the court of the Archduchess Isabella, the widow of the Archduke and the governess of the Southern Netherlands.

After Isabella's death in 1633, Snayers became court painter to the next two governors, the Cardinal-Infante Ferdinand of Austria (1634–1641) and the Archduke Leopold (Wilhelm) (1647–1656). For them he painted scenes of victorious battles in the tradition of sixteenth-century tapestries. He painted portraits of the aristocracy in Brussels and large landscapes. He also worked for other eminent patrons and the open market. A highlight in his career was a commission for 22 battle paintings by general Ottavio Piccolomini.

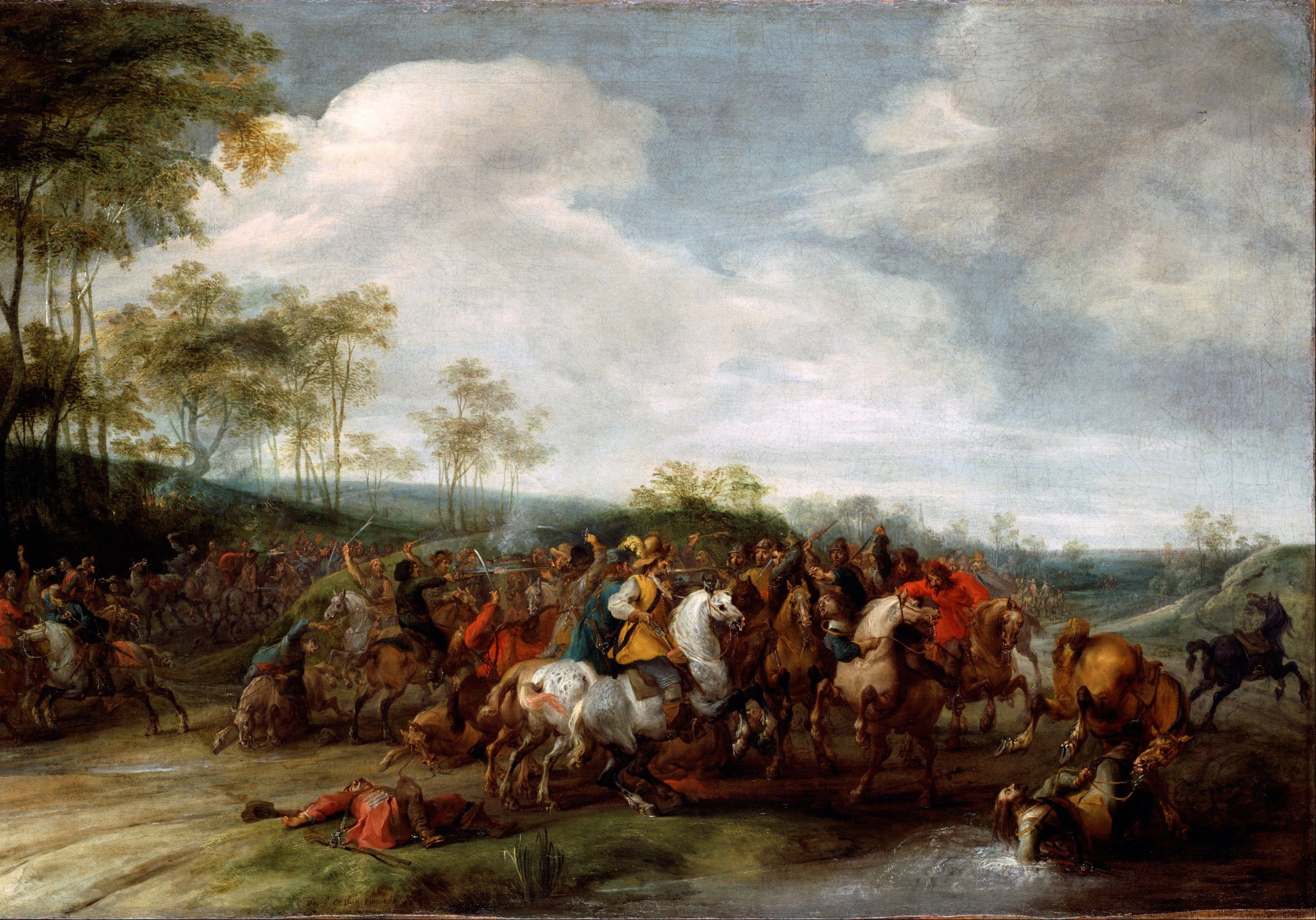
Cavalry skirmish

While working in Brussels he regularly visited his hometown Antwerp but never returned to live there. He collaborated with painters in Antwerp such as Peter Paul Rubens on several occasions, including on the never-finished Life of Henry IV cycle (1628–30) and the Torre de la Parada series (c. 1637–1640). Both during his Antwerp and his Brussels periods, He mingled with the elite of his time. He climbed the social ladder and aspired to live a lifestyle similar to that of the aristocrats of his day. He was thus an example of the 17th century 'aristocratization' of successful citizens.

His pupils included Guilliam van Schoor and Adam Frans van der Meulen. The latter became a leading battle painter and court painter to Louis XIV.

There is no record of when Snayers died but it is believed he died in Brussels in 1667.

== Work ==
=== General ===
Peter Snayers is mainly known as a painter of battles, military engagements, raids on villages and attacks on, or robberies of, convoys. He painted portraits of the aristocracy in Brussels and large landscapes. In addition, he created various hunting scenes and a few religious compositions. Finally, he completed a few compositions showing public processions of the guilds and civil militia.

Stylistically, his coloring was more subdued than that of his teacher Vrancx and reflects contemporary trends in Flemish and Dutch painting.

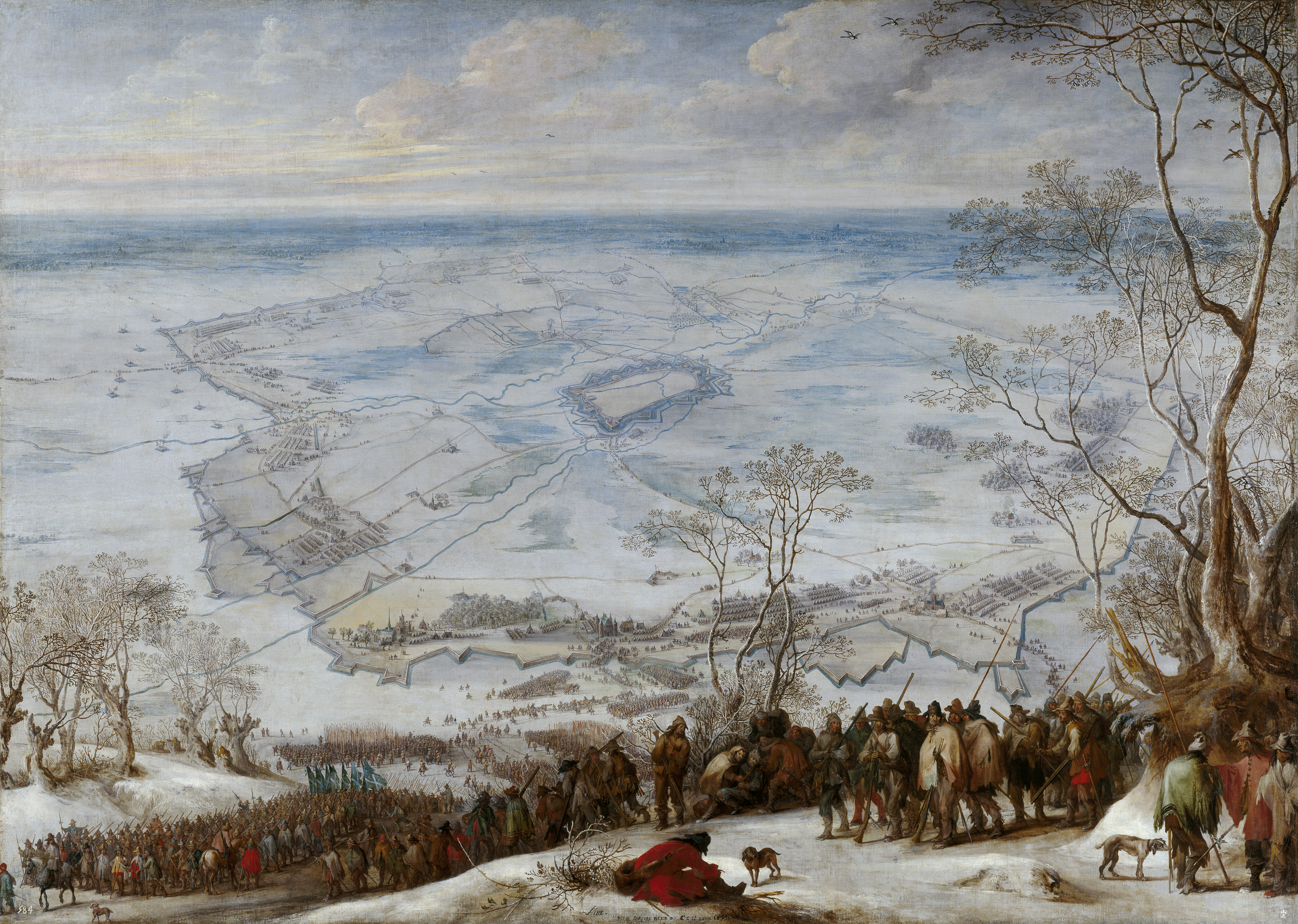
The siege of Aire-sur-la-Lys

=== War artist ===
Peter Snayers created large-scale historical battle scenes as well as smaller works depicting cavalry skirmishes and scenes of soldiers at rest. His historical battle scenes demonstrate a close attention to topographic accuracy. Frequently, these show a shallow foreground that recedes sharply to show a besieged town from a bird's-eye perspective. Snayers paid particular attention to rendering the battle scenes as accurately, completely and true-to-life as possible. He was not present at any of the battles which he depicted. To arrive at his realistic and accurate composition Snayers relied on official military maps, reliable war reports and artistic inventions by other artists. His artistic sources included prints by Georg Braun, Frans Hogenberg, Jacques Callot and works by Peter Paul Rubens.

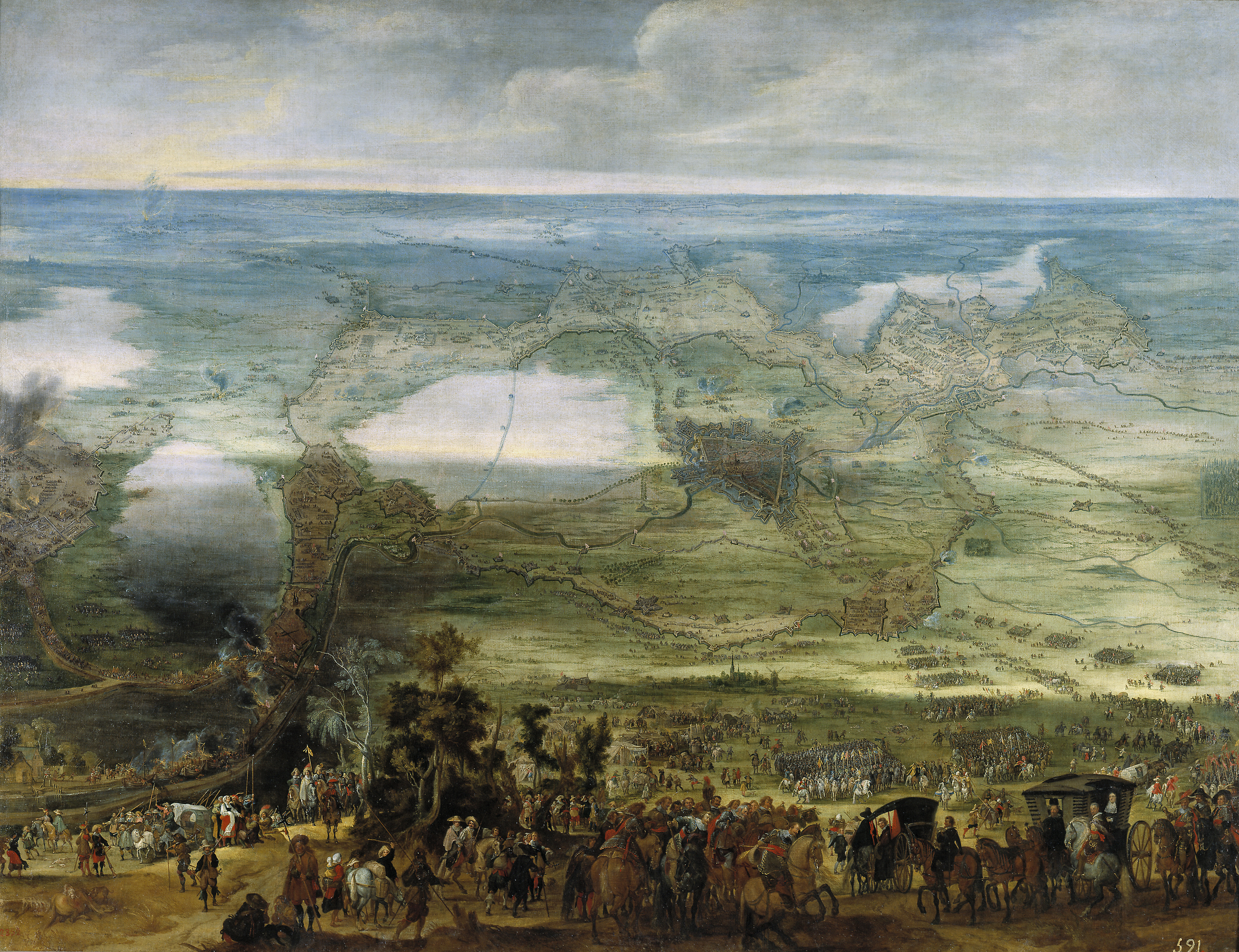
The Archduchess Isabella at the Siege of Breda Prado Museum, Madrid.

Snayers generally did not include in his compositions any explanatory signs, symbols or legends that would help the viewer in identifying which battle was depicted. The absence of such explanatory elements preserved the realism of the picture but also required the viewer to have prior information to understand the subject. As most of his works were commissioned by the highest military leaders in the Habsburg (Spanish and Imperial) army they would have known the scenes depicted.

His large canvases clearly played a dual role: they documented the historical event and at the same time they glorified the military men who participated in the action. The compositions were painted from the point of the patron who commissioned them. Equestrian portraits of the patrons and their coats of arms were included so that their military feats were immortalized. The compositions thus justified the patrons' eminent status in society as well as their loyalty to the Habsburg court. The heroic images were also intended to serve as a model for later generations. As his works' distribution remained limited to the Spanish side, the decay of the Habsburg dynasty in the second half of the 17th century affected the artist's international reputation.

Snayers often painted scenes of assaults by robbers on travelers and of soldiers plundering villages, a subject matter closely related to his military scenes. An example is the Flemish landscape with travellers attacked by robbers (Koller Zürich auction of 23 March 2018, lot 3026). The picture narrates a scene of travellers in a stage coach attempting to ward off an attack of robbers. The scene is full of action and depicts various stages of the attack including the robbers on horse back exchanging fire with the victims, one man already down flat on the ground being robbed and a woman pleading with a robber who is pointing at her.

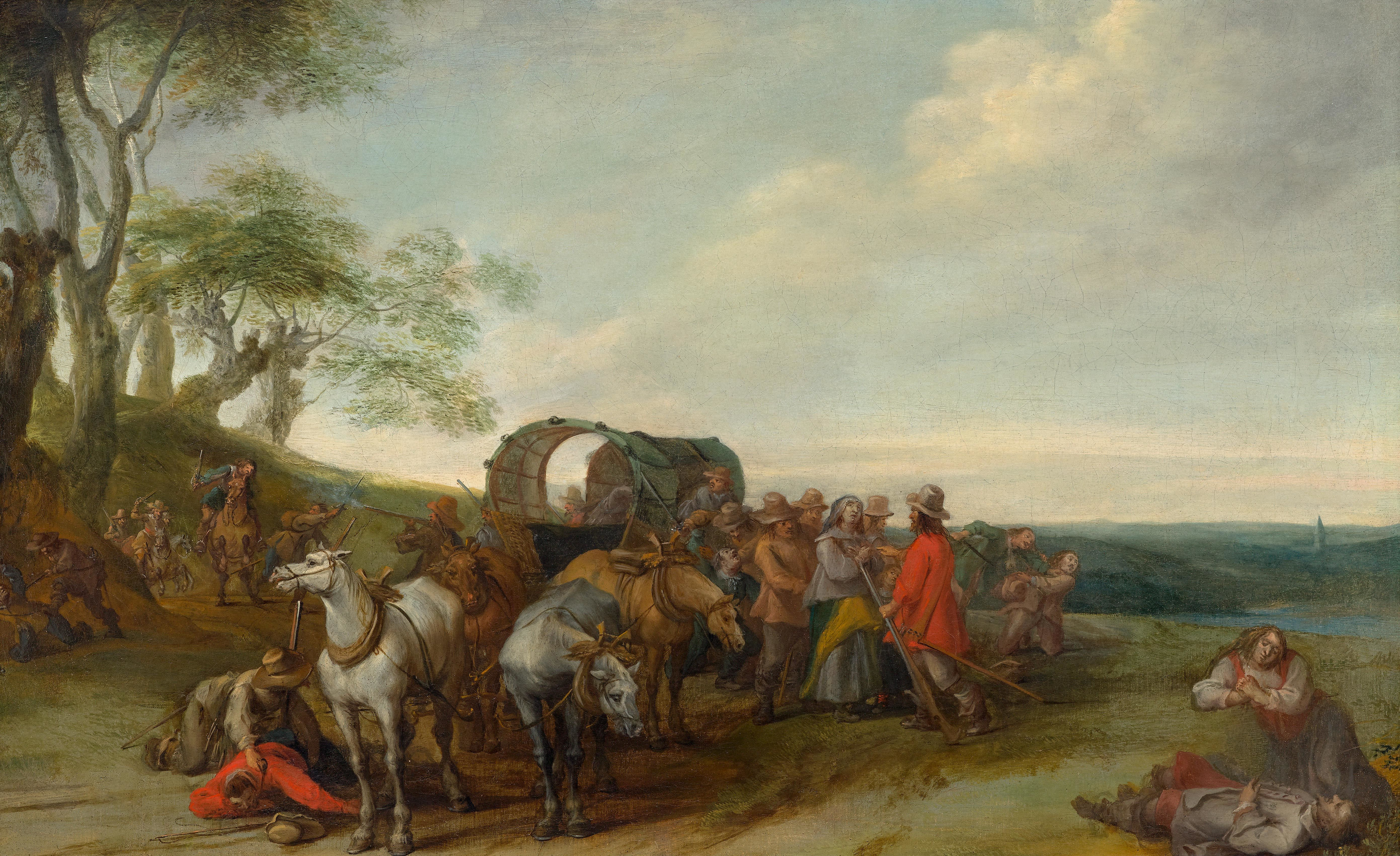
Flemish landscape with travellers attacked by robbers

=== Collaborations ===
As was common in 17th century artistic practice in Antwerp, Snayers often collaborated with other artists. He was a regular collaborator with landscape painters Joos de Momper, Jan Brueghel the Younger and Alexander Keirincx. He also collaborated with Rubens.

In his collaborations with landscape painters, Snayers was responsible for the figures and his collaborators for the landscapes and cityscapes. He collaborated with Joos de Momper principally between 1613 and 1620. The collaborations with Jan Brueghel the Younger date from after 1634. An example of a collaboration with Joos de Momper is the View of a city canal in winter with figures, presumably in Antwerp (at Artcurial, Paris, 19 June 2012, lot 14). The composition shows a city street and canal covered in snow. The scene is animated by many characters going about their daily activities, children enjoying the joys of winter and merchants busy at their stalls. Rather than a topographical view, the painting provides an entertaining testimony of life in a 17th-century city in Flanders. The city depicted is possibly Antwerp.

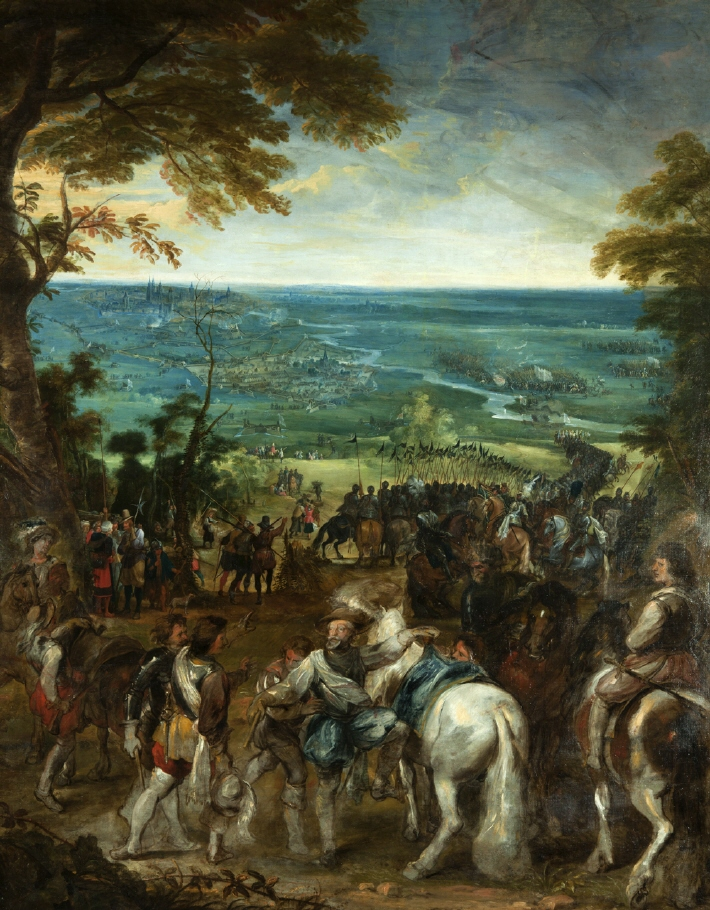
Henry IV at the siege of Amiens, with Rubens

Snayers' collaborations with Peter Paul Rubens included the never-finished cycle on the Life of Henry IV (1628–30) and the Torre de la Parada series (c. 1637–1640). The Life of Henry series was commissioned from Rubens by Marie de' Medici in February 1622 together with a series of paintings about her own life. The two series were intended to decorate the Luxembourg Palace, her new dwellings in Paris that were then under construction. Marie de' Medici had been the Queen of France as the second wife of King Henry IV of France, of the House of Bourbon. Following the assassination of her husband in 1610, she acted as regent for her son, King Louis XIII, until he came of age. The series on the life of the Queen was finished in 1625 and exhibited in the western gallery of the Luxembourg Palace. The series on the life of Henry IV was intended to be displayed in the eastern gallery of the Luxembourg Palace. Rubens worked on the Life of Henry IV from 1628 to 1630. Of the planned 24 pictures, 16 would depict the key battles in which the king himself had participated. Rubens had commenced work on six when the Queen lost her power in 1630 and was forced into exile in 1631. With the loss of his buyer, Rubens was forced to stop work. Five of the paintings have survived and one is missing. The surviving pictures depicted the military feats of the King. The upper portion of the paintings showing prospects of battle scenes were completed by Peter Snayers. These scenes consist of many painstakingly detailed small figures. They contrast with Rubens' contribution in the lower part of the compositions, which consist of significantly larger figures, including King Henry IV on horseback, which fill the foreground. The figures by Rubens are rather sketchy and some art historians believe that they are unfinished. The landscape specialist Lodewijk de Vadder was probably responsible for the large trees that appear in some of the canvases. Despite the contrast between the top half painted by Snayers and the bottom half painted by Rubens, the compositions offer a feeling of unity.

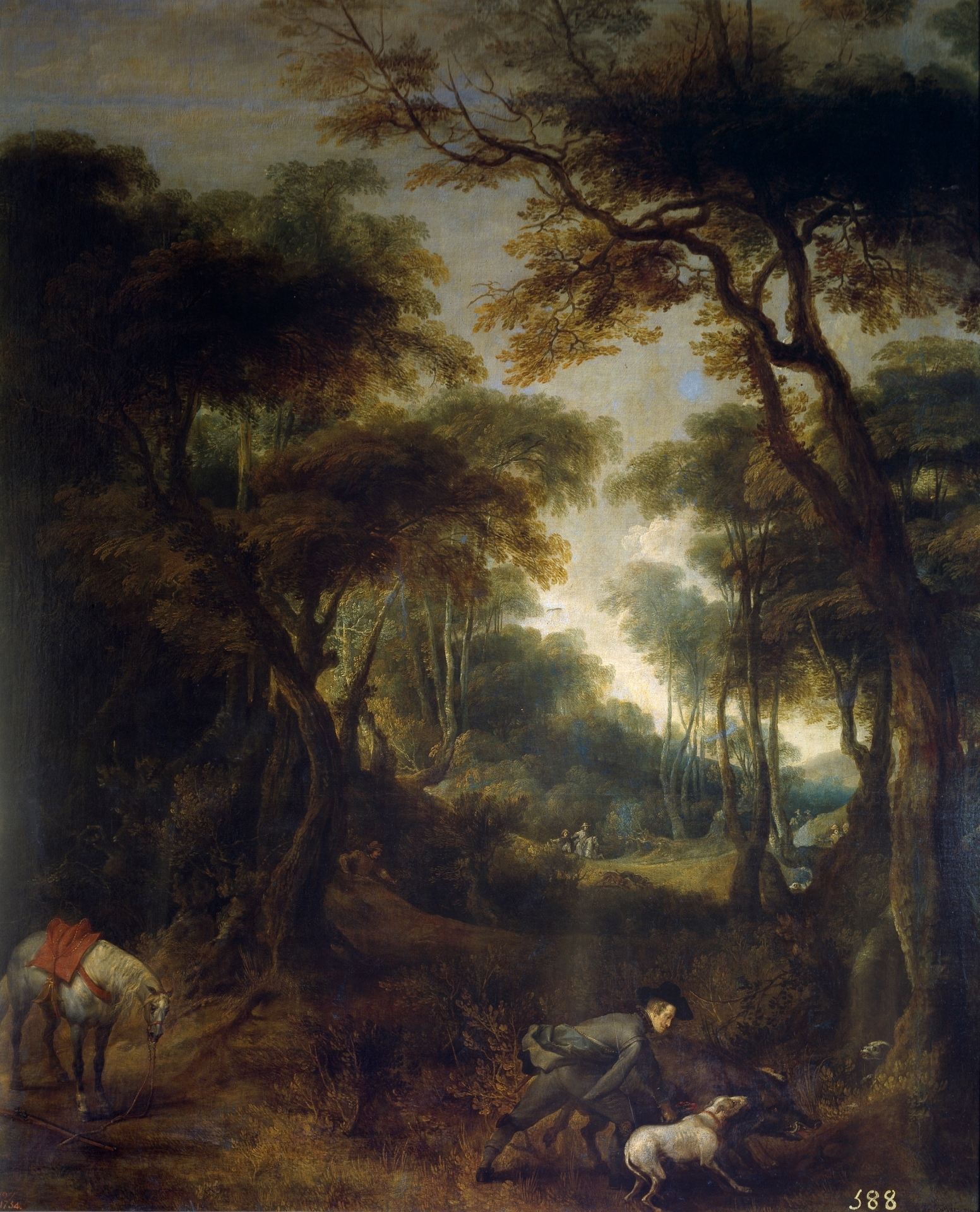
The hunt of Philip IV of Spain. Prado Museum, Madrid.

The Torre de la Parada was a hunting lodge of the Spanish king near Madrid. Rubens had received a commission from the Spanish king Philip IV of Spain to create a series of paintings to decorate the hunting lodge. A majority of the paintings depicted mythological scenes largely based on the Metamorphoses of Ovid. Rubens realized this important commission with the assistance of a large number of Antwerp painters such as Jacob Jordaens, Cornelis de Vos, Jan Cossiers, Thomas Willeboirts Bosschaert, Theodoor van Thulden, Jan Boeckhorst, Jan Baptist Borrekens, Peeter Symons, and Jacob Peter Gowy and others, who worked after Rubens' designs. Snayers was also involved in this project as a collaborator. Two large canvases showing King Philip IV at the hunt are attributed to him.
