= Johannes Banfi Hunyades =

Hungarian alchemist and metallurgist

- János Bánfihunyadi
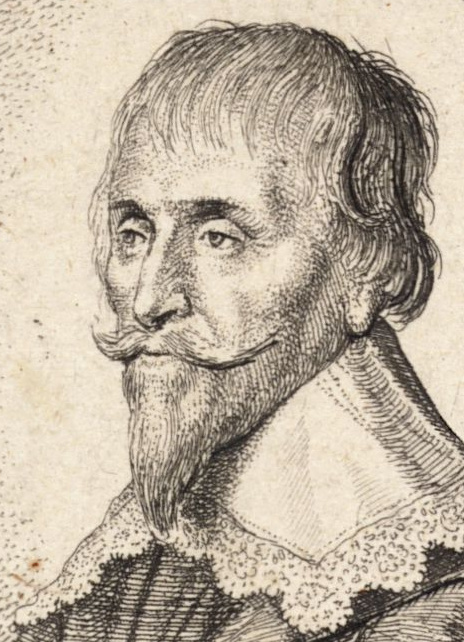
- Engraved portrait (extract) of Banfi Hunyades, 1644. Copied by W. Hollar from a lost original of Gowy. (Note: There are five extant portraits of Hunyades. (Josten & Taylor 1953a, p. 52) presents the first four extant portraits (four contemporary engravings based on a lost painting of Gowy) and (Appleby 1977) presents the last portrait (a 1645 Hungarian silver medallion with a portrait of Banfi Hunyades).)
- Born: 1576; Rivulus Dominarum, Hungary
- Died: 28 August 1646 (aged 70); Amsterdam, Netherlands
- Occupations: Alchemist, chemist, metallurgist
- Spouse: Dorothy Colton (m. 1619)
- Children: 4; including Johannes Banfi Hunyades the Younger, Elisabeth Benson (née Banfi Hunyades)

János Bánfihunyadi (Hungarian: Bánfihunyadi János; 1576 – 28 August 1646), better known by his Latinized name Johannes Banfi Hunyades (Note: Scholars differ on the abbreviation of his name, between Banfi Hunyades and Hunyades. This article uses Banfi Hunyades, as Johannes himself never fully anglicised his name, by shortening it to John Huniades, in his own writings.) or his pseudonym Hans Hungar, was a Hungarian alchemist, chemist and metallurgist. He emigrated to England in 1608 and built a reputation among the academic circles of England and Hungary, associating with such figures as the alchemist Arthur Dee, astrologer William Lilly, physician Jonathan Goddard and scientist Kenelm Digby.

Born in Nagybánya, Hungary, in 1576, Banfi Hunyades took an apprenticeship in goldsmithing in his hometown. Between 1606 and 1608 he took a journey through Europe, passing through Germany and arriving in England by 1608. Upon his arrival he became a successful goldsmith in London, visiting Hungary several times before settling in England upon his marriage to Dorothy Colton in 1619, to whom he had 4 children. Banfi Hunyades kept up his contacts with several eminent Hungarian figures and, in 1633, he was invited by the Prince of Transylvania to occupy a position at his planned academy. As of 1633, Banfi Hunyades took a position at Gresham College, lecturing and experimenting in chemistry with several eminent scientists at the college until as late as 1642. In 1646, before a planned trip with Arthur Dee to Hungary in search of antimony, Banfi Hunyades died on 28 August.

== Biography ==
Banfi Hunyades was born in 1576 in Rivulus Dominarum (Nagybánya), then part of the Kingdom of Hungary, now known as Baia Mare, Romania. He was born to Hungarian Calvinist priest and superintendent for Tiszántúl, Benedek Bánfihunyadi Mogyoró. Benedek had written a text on the Bubonic plague in 1577 (Az mirigyhalálról való rövid ker. értelem), suggesting a family interest in science. His family was possibly descended from the noble Hunyadi family, more specifically King of Hungary Matthias Corvinus, though such reports aren't corroborated by any independent genealogical source other than his son's grave. It is more likely Bánfihunyadi is a toponymic surname, based on Benedek's birthplace of Bánffyhunyad (present-day Huedin, Romania).

Municipal records of Baia Mare indicate Banfi Hunyades owned and operated a vineyard and pressing house. He became an apprentice of goldsmithing in his birthplace, working under a coiner. As of 1606, Banfi Hunyades was in Kassa (today Košice in Slovakia), a popular destination for journeymen goldsmiths.

He soon set of on a journey through Europe, possibly passing through Rudolf II's court in the Holy Roman Empire and the court of Maurice of Hesse-Kassel. Maurice of Hesse-Kassel's court was an epicenter of occult and alchemical activity in Europe at the time, with several English alchemists and natural philosophers visiting it. It is not definitely known that he passed through either country, but a later notebook reveals a method of transmutation which he attributes to 'a certain famous and generous Bohemian lord', alongside a reference to Edward Kelley, who worked in the court of Rudolf II. Banfi Hunyades was in Germany around 1608, where he bought a Károli Bible.

Banfi Hunyades arrived to England in 1608, becoming a well-off goldsmith in London, though he never joined the Goldsmith's Guild as he lived outside the City of London. In 1613, he sent a letter to his brother informing him of his position and wealth, promising to visit Nagybánya the next year and asking him to take care of his books and instruments left in Hungary. He clearly kept close links to Hungary, conversing and corresponding in Hungarian with Hungarians in London and in his home country. On 5 July 1617, he donated a lavishly bound German edition of the Hungarian Károli Bible to the Bodleian Library upon a visit to Oxford, as a parting gift for a trip to Hungary. (Note: The Bible is currently in Christ Church Library under signature NA. 5.2.) George Gomori has suggested that Banfi Hunyades was at Oxford to meet with Thomas Allen, as William Lilly later received a manuscript of Allen's from Banfi Hunyades.

In 1619, Banfi Hunyades married Dorothy Colton, daughter of Sir Francis Colton of Kent. Presumably this limited his travel to Hungary, but he continued to keep up his contacts by corresponding in Hungarian with several eminent Hungarian scholars, such as Pál Medgyesi and Gábor Haller, with some even visiting him in London. Around this time it has been conjectured that Arthur Dee, son of John Dee, associated with Banfi Hunyades in a trip to Hungary in search of antimony, valued as an alchemical substance. This is evidenced by some suggestive passages in the manuscript of Arcana Arcanorum where Dee mentions sending a Hungarian friend to collect some "prima materia" (here referring to antimony), how he would not dare visit Hungary without this "faithful friend", alongside some lines echoing inscriptions on Banfi Hunyades's engraved portraits. Dee would later plan a trip to Hungary to collect antimony with Banfi Hunyades, though it fell through after Banfi Hunyades's death.

In 1633, Prince of Transylvania George I Rákóczi saw Banfi Hunyades fit to occupy a professorship at his planned academy in Kolozsvár (present-day Cluj-Napoca, Romania), being that he had experience within the English academic system and knowledge in chemistry. There is no evidence he accepted this position and by 1633 he was in the employ of Gresham College.

Around 1633, Banfi Hunyades became the assistant of natural philosopher Kenelm Digby at Gresham College, though this position was not an official post for either of them and they were not paid for their work. Digby constructed a lab beneath the house of the Gresham Professor of Divinity where the two conducted botanical experiments. There is circumstantial evidence Digby sent Banfi Hunyades out on expeditions to Hungary in search of antimony, as he had allegedly done before with Dee. Hunyades also gave lectures in chemistry, one of which is recorded by John Webster, who studied under Banfi Hunyades, in his Metallographia (1671). He also worked with Gresham Professor of Physic, Jonathan Goddard; an experiment recorded in a notebook of Goddard's has been speculated by C. H. Josten and F. Sherwood Taylor to constitute the first record of temperature measurement in distillation. Banfi Hunyades may have had a position at the college as late as 1642. He erroneously claimed to be a professor in a letter to Medgyesi, and has since been misidentified as a professor of the college, but there are no records of him as such, and his marriage and field disqualified him from professorship. (Note: Banfi Hunyades was best known as a chemist and no such professorship existed in Gresham at the time.)

Banfi Hunyades's alchemical work was mostly preoccupied with the properties of mercury, the secrets of which he thought would reveal the secret of transmutation. He saw mercury as the prima materia of alchemy. According to William Lilly, in his dedicatication to Banfi Hunyades in Anglicus, peace, or no peace (1645), the Latin phrase "Est in Mercurio quicquid quaerunt sapientes" (Note: In English: "There is, in mercury, whatever wise men seek" The full dedication from Josten & Taylor 1953a, p. 47: "So that although in person you leave us, we shall have cause to remember, that sometimes here lived amongst us, Johannes Banfi Huniades Hermeticae Philosophiae indagator solertissimus, whose usual word was, Est in Mercurio quicquid quaerunt sapientes.") was Banfi Hunyades's motto and the phrase is featured in all of his engraved portraits. An inscription on his portrait describes one such alchemical accomplishment of his, an experiment in which he destroyed gold and silver by way of mercury, reduced the resultant substance into mercury and precipitated the mercury into a red powder. He was clearly proud of the experiment, as it is inscribed on the frame of each of his engraved portraits – based on a Gowy portrait showing him holding the vessel he used to perform the experiment. This alchemical preoccupation has been criticized with the biographer Reverend James Granger describing him as "far gone in his philosophical fanaticism" and Martyn Rady suggests the red powder was probably only oxidized mercury.

His characterization as a purely alchemical figure by writers such as Granger, who called him a "smoke-dried mercurialist", has been criticized by some Modern scholars. Schultheisz and Tardy claimed that, in his experiments, "the ingredients of the prescriptions, the chemical techniques applied, the methods of preparation all doubtlessly prove that Bánfihunyadi must have been a true chemist".

In 1646, Arthur Dee, a lifelong devotee of the search for the philosopher's stone, made plans with Banfi Hunyades in London to meet in Amsterdam and travel to Hungary in search of antimony. Antimony was professed by several alchemists, notably Basil Valentine, as being a prima materia and the purest form was thought to be found in from Hungary. This followed several conjectured trips of Banfi Hunyades to Hungary in search of Antimony, though this is the only trip there exists hard evidence of. Dee and Banfi Hunyades were known to have associated before this point, with their experiments together weighing heavily on Dee's wealth.

Banfi Hunyades died suddenly on 28 August 1646 at the age of 70 in Amsterdam, where he was to meet Dee, destroying his plans of returning to Hungary with Dee. Though not a wealthy man for most of his life, Banfi Hunyades died with a reasonably large fortune; as of September 1644, his son Johannes was made sole heir of his possessions, making quite a large sum of money as the manager of his estate. His place of burial is unknown.

Banfi Hunyades and Dorothy had four children. Two of his children, Johannes (1621–1696) and Elizabeth (1620–1710), have large memorials in the crypt of St Leonard's, Shoreditch. Johannes was educated in the Merchant Taylors' School, Northwood, beginning as the alchemist of Philip Herbert, 5th Earl of Pembroke, but ending as a rich usurer of poor reputation in London. His grave claims the, likely erroneous, descendance from the Hunyadi family.

== Historical investigation ==
Inscriptions from Banfi Hunyades's Bible

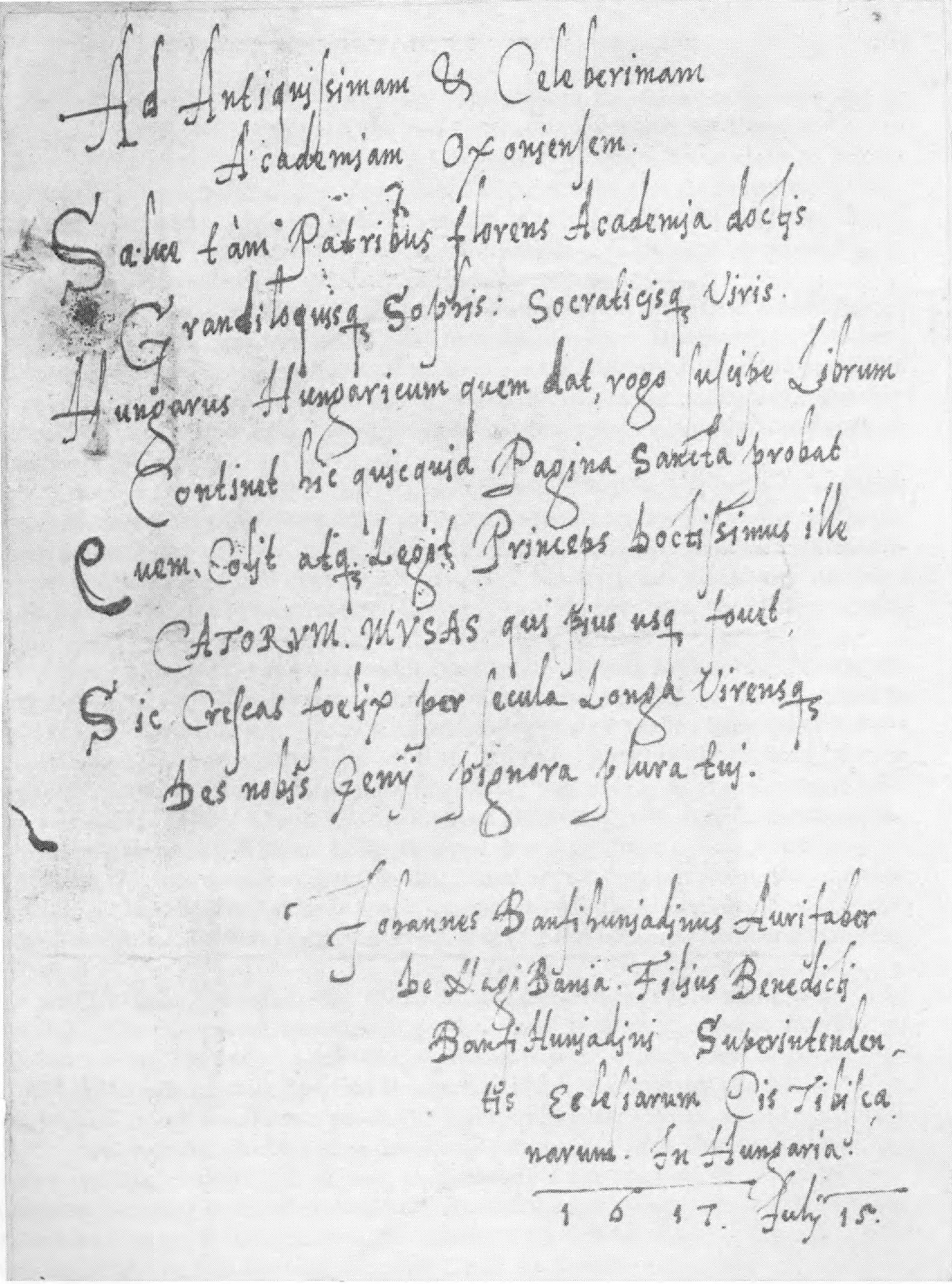
Latin poem with a short Latin biographical inscription below.

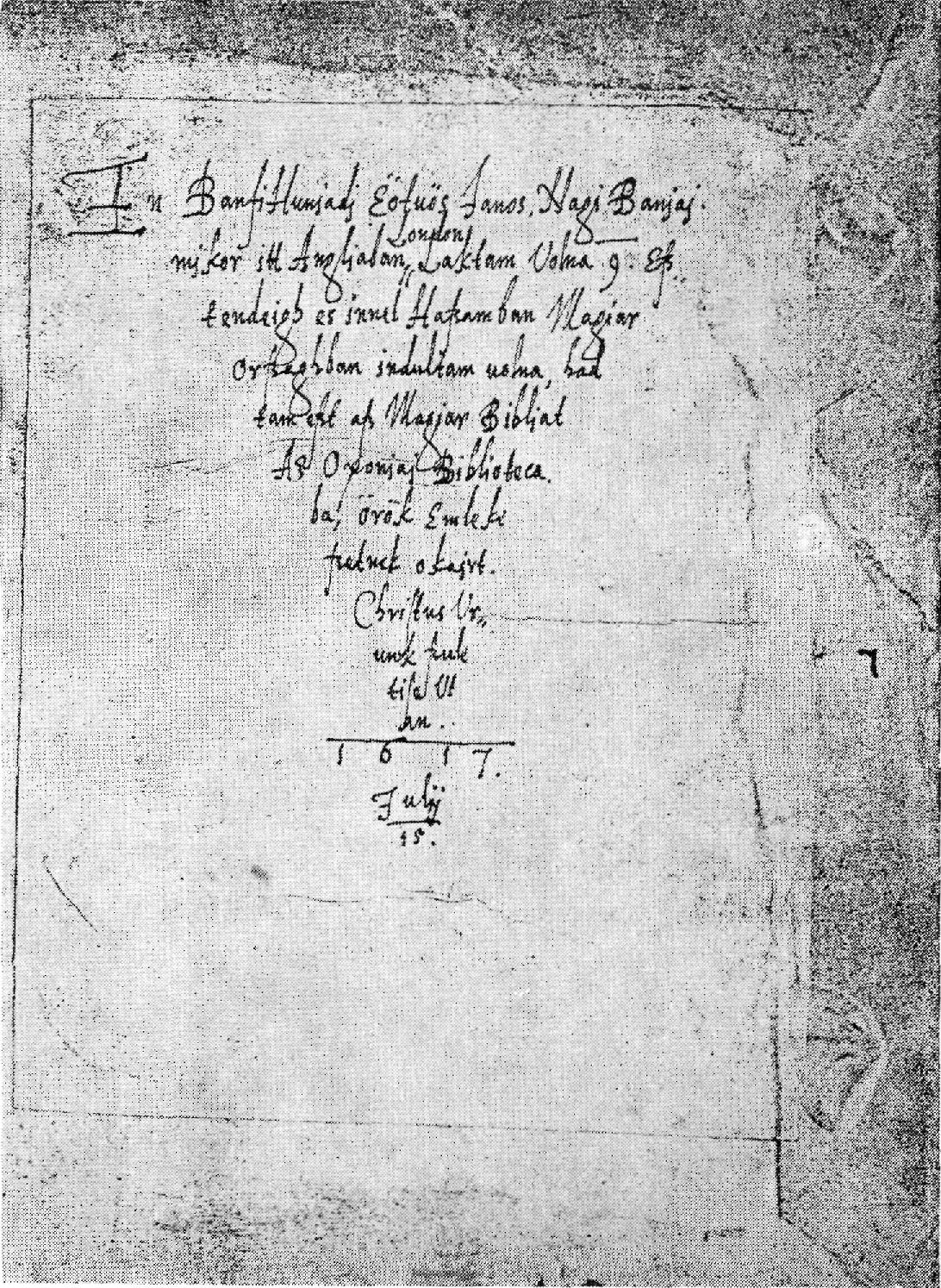
Hungarian dedication, written upon leaving for Hungary.

Johannes Banfi Hunyades never published anything during his lifetime, and his entire Nachlass consists of only a few inscriptions, letters and experimental notes surviving from his lifetime. The fact that, through the 20th-century, Anglophone and Hungarian scholars have been able to piece together the life of a relatively obscure Hungarian alchemist from contemporary comments, manuscript notes and municipal records has been described by Martyn Rady as "a comment on the extent of the archival and literary sources which survive [...] after almost three and a half centuries".

There are five extant contemporary portraits of Banfi Hunyades. Four of these portraits are contemporary engravings based on a lost painting of Jacob Peter Gowy, three by Wenceslaus Hollar, all dated to 1644, and one by William Marshall, dated 1646. The engraved portraits show Banfi Hunyades bearded and elderly, holding the glass vessel which he utilized in his mercurial experiments. The engraved portraits are all enclosed within a frame of alchemical quotations and biographical inscriptions on Banfi Hunyades, revealing his preoccupation with alchemy, mathematics and mercury as well as his birthplace of Nagybánya. Beneath the frame of the engravings is the monas sign, as described by John Dee in his Monas Hieroglyphica and each engraving is flanked by scientific instruments and alchemical symbols. The Hollar engravings with compass and protractor on the left and retort, alembic and curcubit on the right; the Marshall engraving supported by figures of Sol, Luna and Mercury. These engravings were the first evidence used by Josten and Taylor in their original biographical investigation into Banfi Hunyades.

The fifth extant portrait of Banfi Hunyades was discovered by Hungarian medical historian, Julius von Magyary-Kossa, in 1929 during research for his historical work, Ungarische Medizinische Erinnerungen. The portrait, in the collection of Dr Geza Faludy as of 1929, is a small silver medallion struck in 1645. The portrait has similarities to the engraved portraits in its borders, populated with alchemical imagery, but on the whole the medallion is very different. The medallion shows Hunyades in profile with a full head of hair, beard and small medallion. He is crowned with Latin text giving his name and birthplace, alongside his age of 69 at the foot.

Around 1977, Hungarian academic George Gomori, during a survey of Hungarian Bibles in Oxford, discovered a note about a Hanau Bible (the second edition of the Vizsoly Bible) sold by the Bodleian Library to Christ Church Library around 1676. The beautifully bound 1608 German edition of the Bible was found to contain an inscription from Banfi Hunyades himself. The inscription begins with the first gold-lettered page, signed with a date of 1617 and the initials of Banfi Hunyades (H x I x NB for Hunyadinus Iohannes Nagybánya). The following page has a verse Latin poem, entitled Ad Antiquissimam et Celeberimam Academiam Oxoniensem, and a short Latin inscription giving some biographical information on Banfi Hunyades; describing himself as an aurifaber (i.e. a goldsmith and alchemist) and the son of "Benedick Banfi Huniadinus". The Hungarian inscription on the page after describes his giving of the book to "the Oxford Library, to be remembered forever" on 15 July 1617. This inscription gives the definite date for his arrival to England as 1608, describing how in 1617 he had "lived here in England for 9 years".
