= Theodoor van Thulden =

Dutch painter (1606–1669)

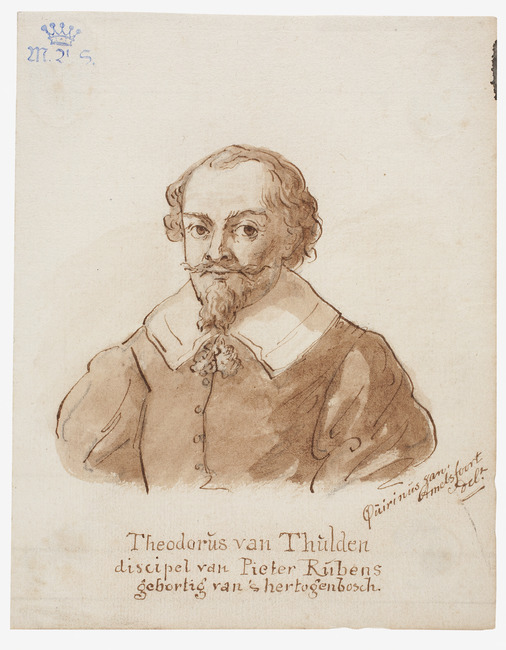
- Portrait of Theodoor van Thulden by Quirinus van Amelsfoort. (Note: The inscription on the drawing is in Old Dutch: "Theodorus van Thulden, discipel van Pieter Rubens, gebortig van s’Hertogenbosch".) The inscription reads in English: "Theodoor van Thulden, pupil of Peter Rubens, born in ’s-Hertogenbosch."
- Born: Dirrick van Thulden; 9 August 1606 's-Hertogenbosch, Duchy of Brabant (present-day North Brabant, Netherlands)
- Died: 12 July 1669 (aged 62) 's-Hertogenbosch, Duchy of Brabant
- Education: Apprentice of Abraham van Blijenberch
- Occupations: Painter; Draughtsman; Engraver
- Known for: Baroque religious paintings; Allegorical painting; Engraving; Civic decoration
- Notable work: Pompa Introitus Ferdinandi (1635); Decorations for Torre de la Parada (c. 1636–1638); Allegories for Stadhuis van 's-Hertogenbosch (1640s–1650s); Contributions to Oranjezaal at Huis ten Bosch (1648–1651)
- Movement: Flemish Baroque
- Spouse: Maria van Balen (m. 1635)

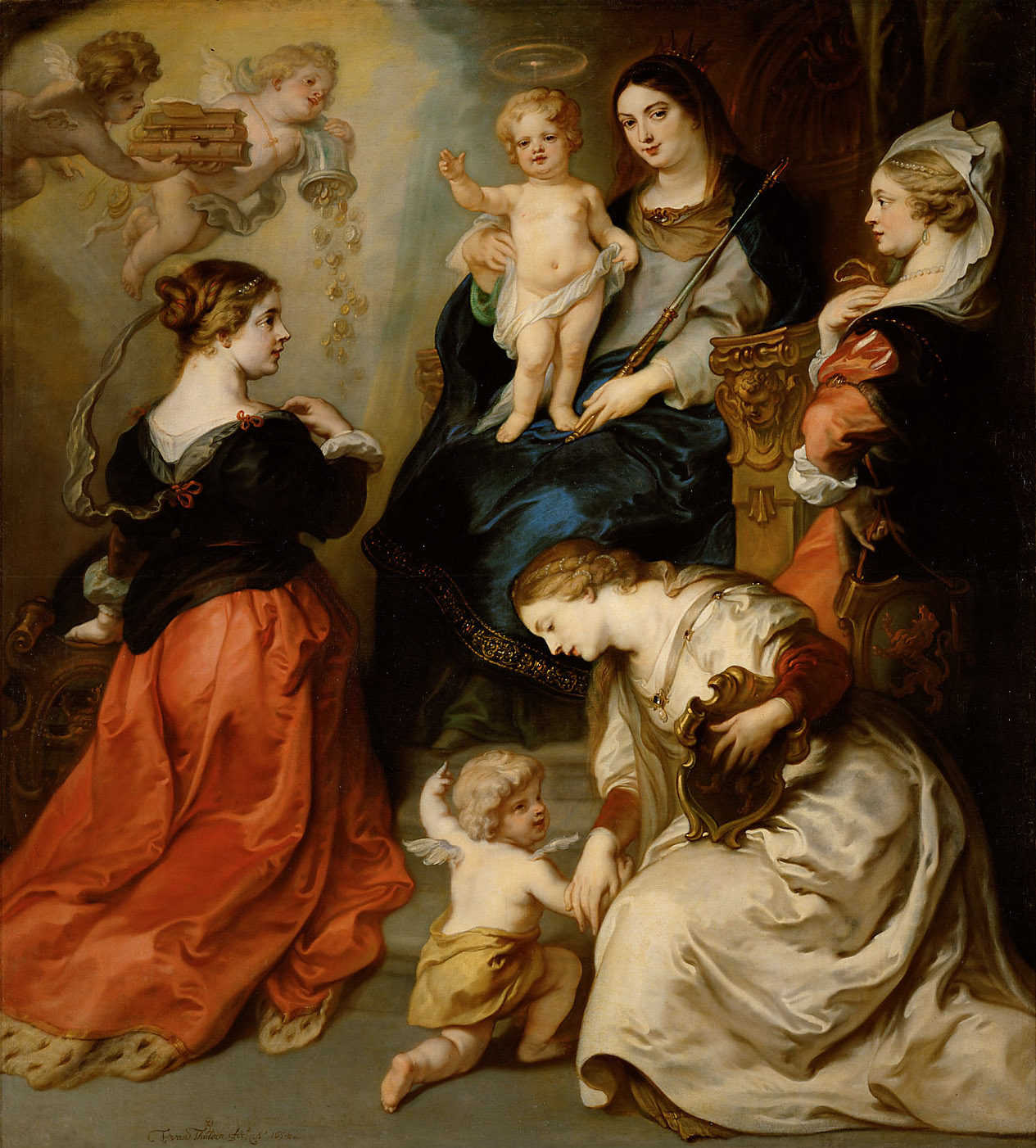
The provinces of Brabant, Hainaut and Flanders pay homage to the Virgin

Theodoor van Thulden (Note: Name variations: Theodor van Thulden, Theodoor van Tulden, Theodore van Thulden, Theodor van Tulden, Theodoor van Thulden, Theodor Van Thulden, Dierik van Thulden) (9 August 1606 – 12 July 1669) was a Flemish painter, draughtsman and engraver born in 's-Hertogenbosch in the duchy of Brabant. He is mainly known for his altarpieces, mythological subjects, allegorical works and portraits. He was active in Antwerp, where he had trained, as well as in Paris and his native 's-Hertogenbosch.

== Life ==
Theodoor van Thulden was born in 's-Hertogenbosch where he was baptized on 9 August 1606 in the St. John's Cathedral as "Dirrick". Van Thulden was the oldest of at least nine children of whom one called Franchois would also become a painter. His father Jacob Gerits van Tulden (1575–1630) was trained as a silversmith, but earned his living as a cloth merchant. His mother Heylwich (Heylke) van Meurs was a daughter of the silversmith Dierck Aerts van Moers. The family was well-off.

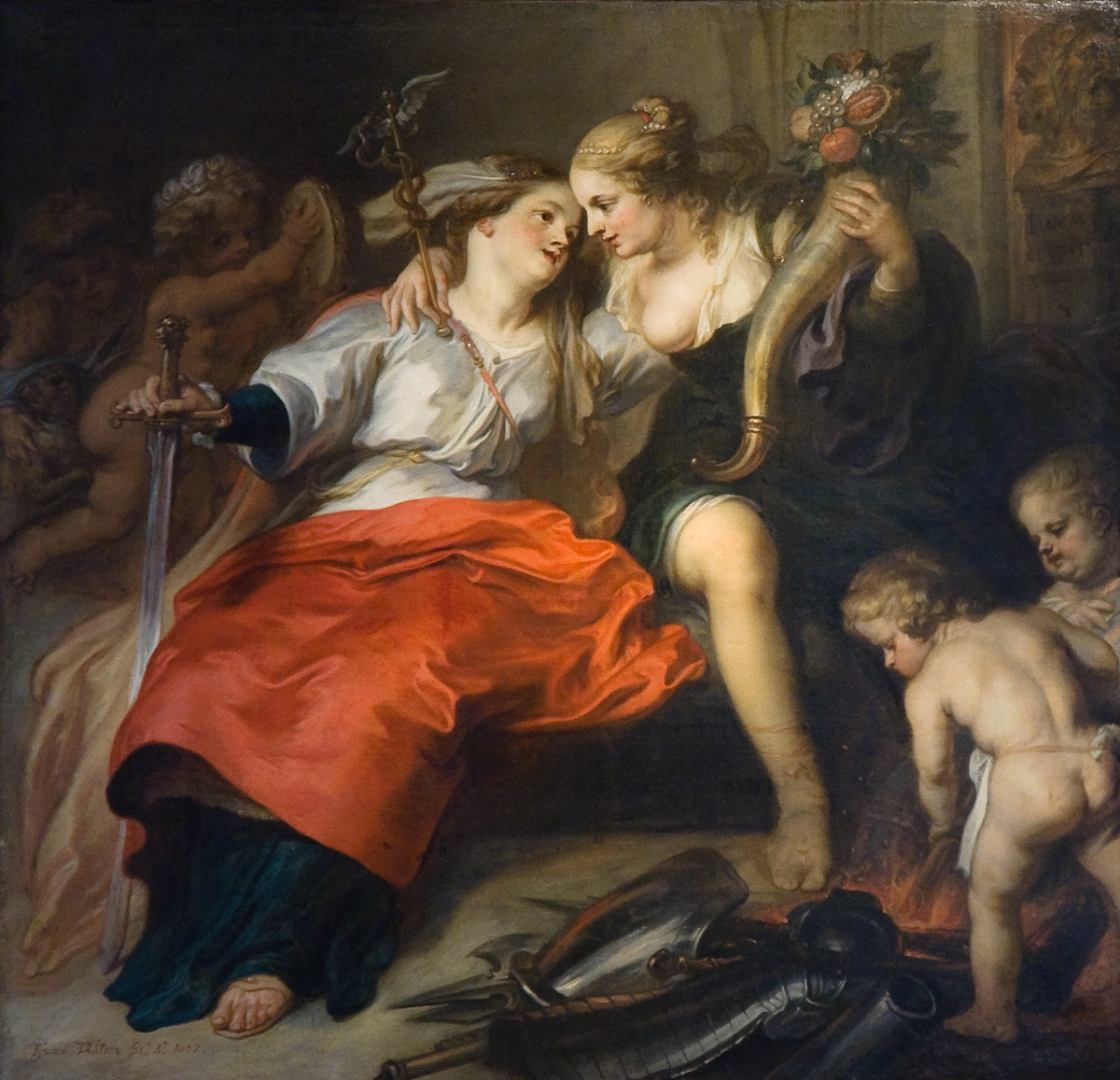
Allegory of the return of peace

Around 1621 van Thulden left his hometown for Antwerp where he became a pupil of Abraham van Blijenberch. Van Blijenberch was a reputed portrait painter who had previously worked in London as a painter to King James I and other members of the court. After van Blijenberch's death in 1623 van Thulden remained in Antwerp. Some art historians have suggested that during this period he could have been a pupil or assistant of Peter Paul Rubens. Others have questioned such apprenticeship with Rubens as van Thulden's style remained beholden to Mannerist tendencies into the 1630s and betrayed initially no influence from Rubens' Baroque idiom.

In 1626 van Thulden became a master in the Guild of St. Luke of Antwerp. Between 1631 and 1633 or 1634, he stayed in Paris where he studied the works of the Mannerist masters of the School of Fontainebleau. This study reinforced his already strong Mannerist tendencies. This is reflected in a series of 58 prints depicting Odysseus' journeys which he engraved around this time. These prints were made after the paintings of Primaticcio and Niccolo dell'Abbate in the Palace of Fontainebleau near Paris.

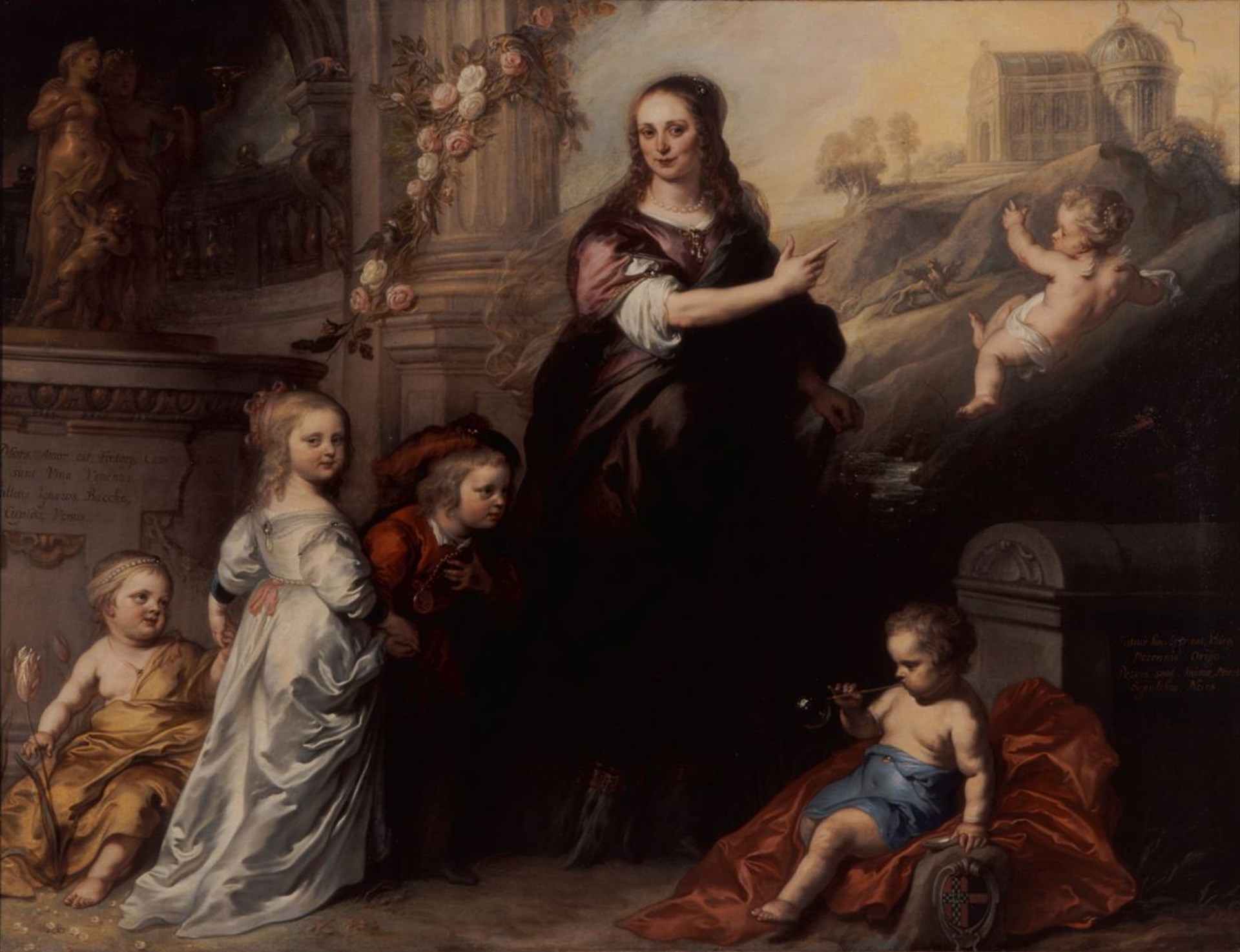
Portrait of Josina Copes-Schade van Westrum and Her Children

In 1635 van Thulden returned to Antwerp where on 24 July 1635 he married Maria van Balen, daughter of the prominent Antwerp painter Hendrick van Balen the Elder (1575–1632) and sister of the painters Hendrick the Younger and Jan van Balen. The godfather at his wife's baptism had been no one less than Peter Paul Rubens. Theodoor and Maria had one child, a daughter named Maria Anna, who was baptized in Antwerp on 7 May 1636 and died between 1652 and 1669.

It is from this time onwards that van Thulden's collaboration with Rubens is firmly documented. He first worked on the decorations for the 1635 Joyous Entry (the so-called 'Pompa Introitus') into Antwerp of the new governor of the Habsburg Netherlands Cardinal-Infante Ferdinand. Rubens was in overall charge of this project and enlisted the assistance of his fellow artists to execute the decorative project for this event. Rubens came up with the general concept of the decorative paintings but left their execution to about twenty painters. For the event, van Thulden was commissioned to paint the Arc of Mercury on the Sint-Jansbrug and the Porticus Austriaca on the Meirbrug, for which he received 3500 and 1500 guilders respectively. In addition van Thulden received from the Antwerp city council the commission to create prints of the art works and decorations that were created for the Joyous Entry. These were published in the Pompa Introitus honori serenissimi principis Ferdinandi Austriaci. The publication of this work was delayed by because Gaspar Gevaerts failed to deliver the captions for the prints. The work was only printed in 1641, and van Thulden was compensated by the city council for his loss resulting from the delay in publication.

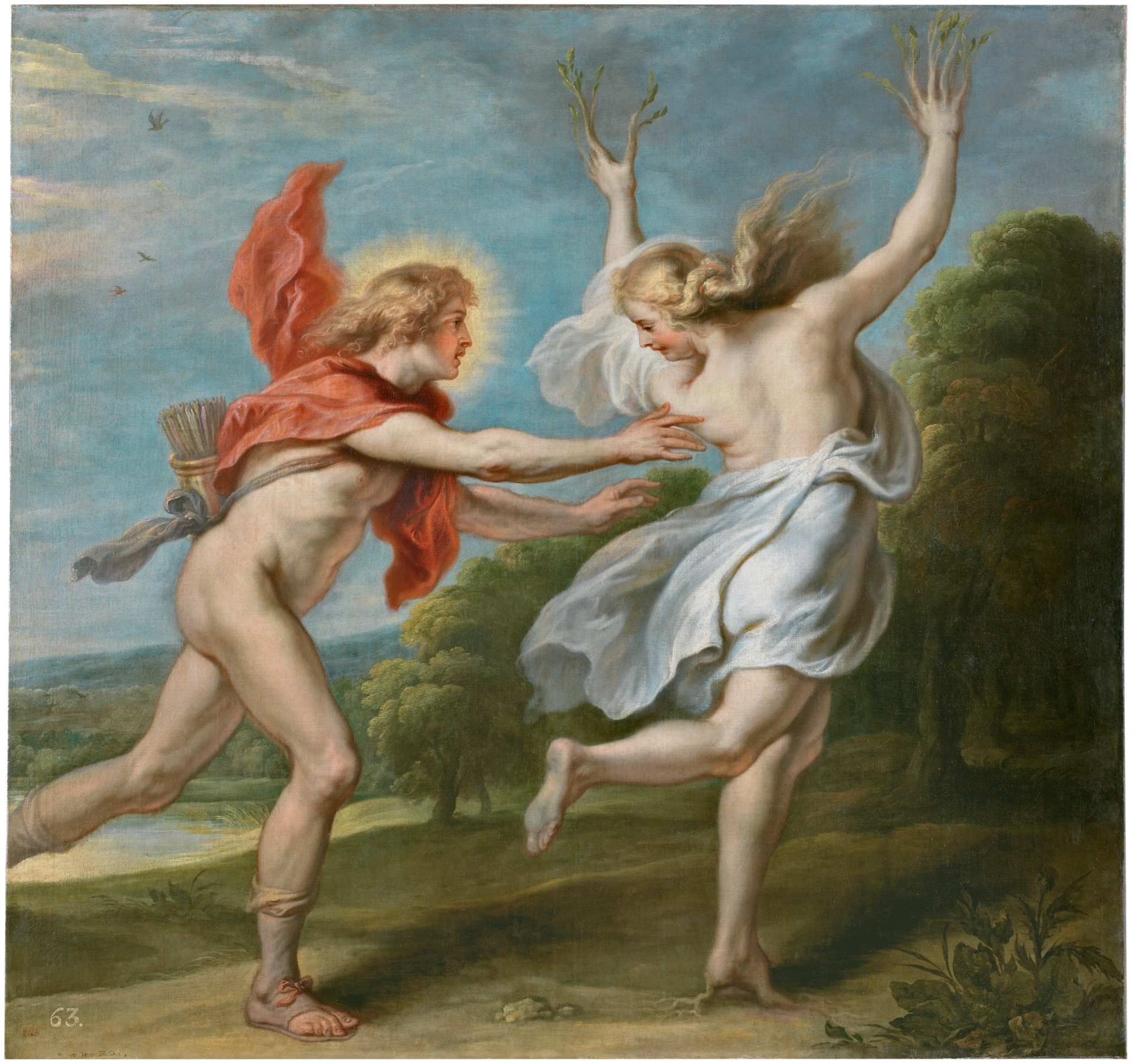
Apollo pursuing the nymph Daphne

Rubens received in 1636 a commission from the Spanish king Philip IV of Spain to create a series of mythological paintings to decorate the Torre de la Parada, a hunting lodge of the king near Madrid. The mythological scenes depicted in the series were largely based on the Metamorphoses of Ovid. Rubens realized this important commission with the assistance of a large number of Antwerp painters such as Jacob Jordaens, Cornelis de Vos, Jan Cossiers, Peter Snayers, Thomas Willeboirts Bosschaert, Jan Boeckhorst, Jacob Peter Gowy, Peeter Symons, Jan Baptist Borrekens and others, who worked after Rubens' designs. Van Thulden was also involved in this project as a collaborator. At least three of the works that van Thulden created for this series have been preserved at the Museo del Prado including Apollo pursuing the nymph Daphne.

Van Thulden bought in 1636 his citizenship of the city of Antwerp and was chapel master of the Venerable Chapel in St. James's Church in 1637–1639. In 1639 he was dean of the chamber of rhetoric Olijftak. He was dean of the Guild of Saint Luke of Antwerp in the guild year 1639–1640. He never presented the accounts for the period of his tenure as dean and his decision to leave Antwerp in 1643 may have had something to do with malversations relating to the Guild's funds. Although successful, van Thulden seems to have been regularly in dire straits.

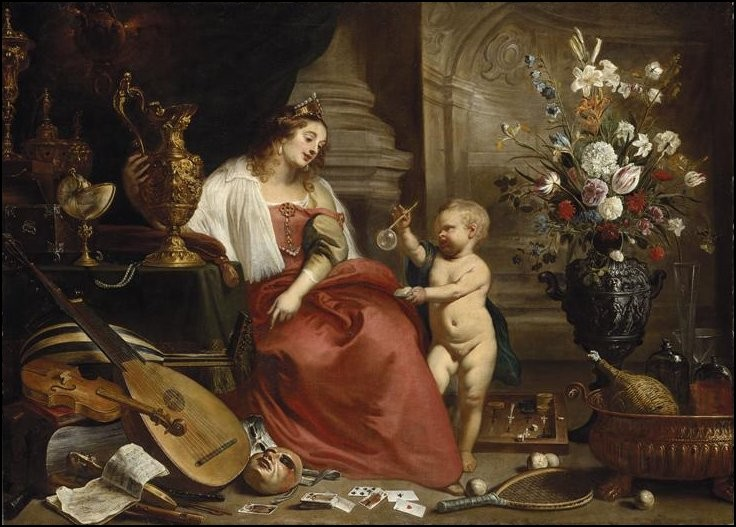
Allegory of the transience of happiness, collaboration with Adriaen van Utrecht

In 1640 he received a commission from his home town 's-Hertogenbosch to create political allegories for the city hall. In 1643 Theodoor had left Antwerp and lived in Oirschot where he became a citizen in October 1644. By 1646 or 1647 van Thulden had moved to 's-Hertogenbosch.

Van Thulden continued to paint altarpieces and other commissions for Catholic patrons in the Southern Netherlands as well as political allegories, many related to the 1648 Peace of Westphalia. In the period of 1648-1651 he also participated in the decorations for the Oranjezaal in the Huis ten Bosch, The Hague, a commission for Amalia von Solms on which worked Dutch and Flemish artists such as Gerard van Honthorst and Jacob Jordaens. In 1656-1663 van Thulden designed pattern boards for the glass artist Jean de Labarre for three large glass windows for the Our Lady Chapel in the Cathedral of St. Michael and St. Gudula in Brussels. Van Thulden was the tutor of painter Hendrick van Balen the Younger.

Theodoor van Thulden died in 's-Hertogenbosch on 12 July 1669.

== Work ==
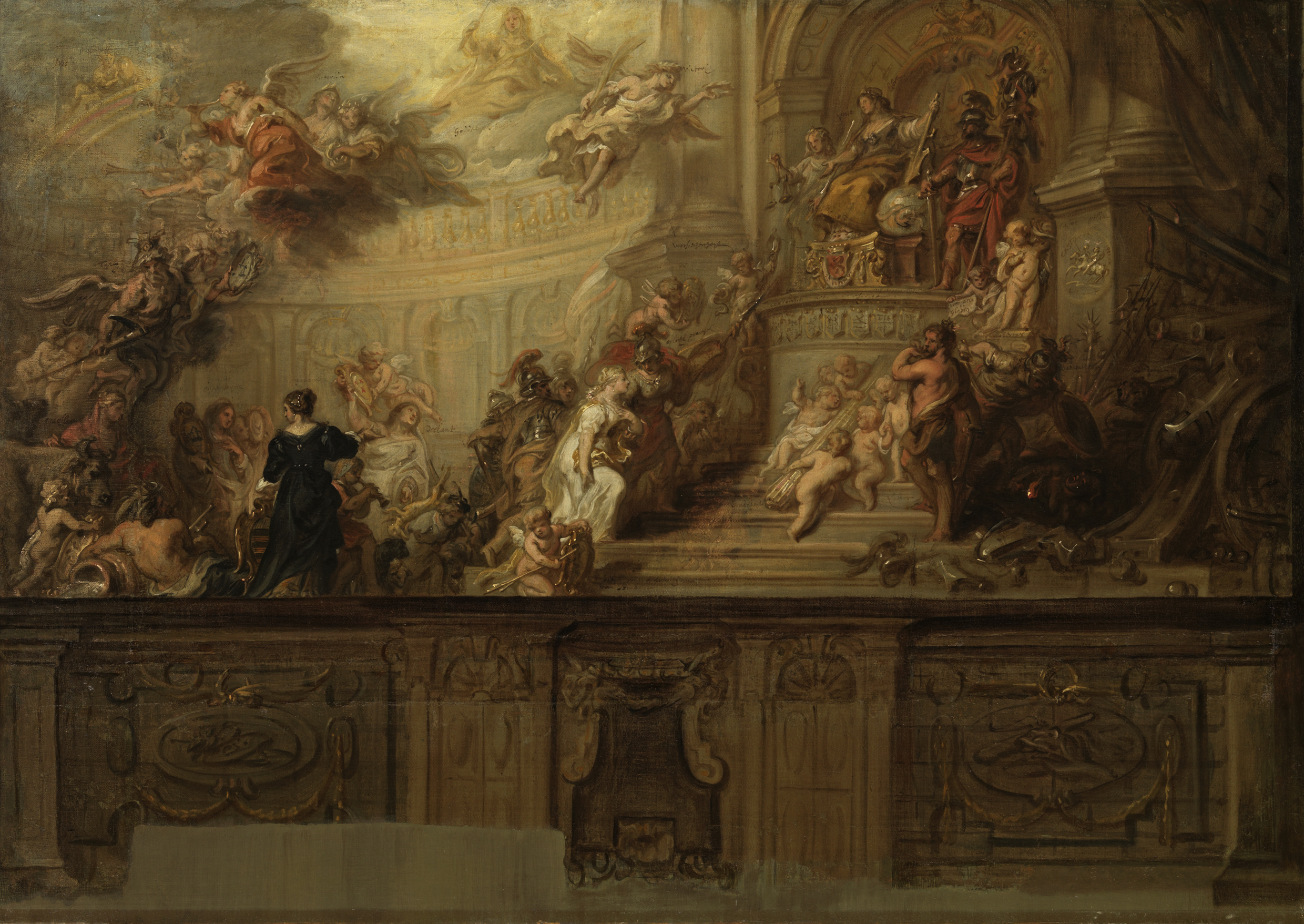
Allegorical depiction of the inclusion of 's-Hertogenbosch in the Union

Van Thulden painted altarpieces, mythological subjects, allegorical works and portraits. His style was initially influenced by the Mannerism of the School of Fontainebleau but he later became influenced by Peter Paul Rubens, with whom he frequently collaborated. He played an important mediating role by bringing aspects of Flemish Baroque painting into the Dutch Republic. Gradually van Thulden's work became more elegant and he evolved towards a certain Classicism.

Van Thulden explored the portrait genre and made group portraits of important families as well as individual portraits of prominent people from local political and religious circles. In some of these works van Thulden created a portrait style that included allegorical allusions and attempted to recapture the elegance and delicacy of van Dyck's portraits.

Van Thulden also specialized in large allegories with a political message. His skill in this area is demonstrated by the decorations he made for the City Hall of 's-Hertogenbosch. He is known to have painted Justice and Concord (1646), The Right of the Four-Quarters of the Meierij District to Appeal Before the Court of 's-Hertogenbosch (1647) and The Request for Admission to the Union (1650). These works still hang in the city hall. An oil sketch with an Allegorical depiction of the inclusion of 's-Hertogenbosch in the Union (Akademie der Bildenden Künste, Vienna) was likely an earlier design for the allegorical project which was apparently rejected by the city magistrates.

Churches in the Southern Netherlands also approached him for altarpieces.
