= Torre de la Parada =

Coordinates: 40°32′41″N 03°45′19″W

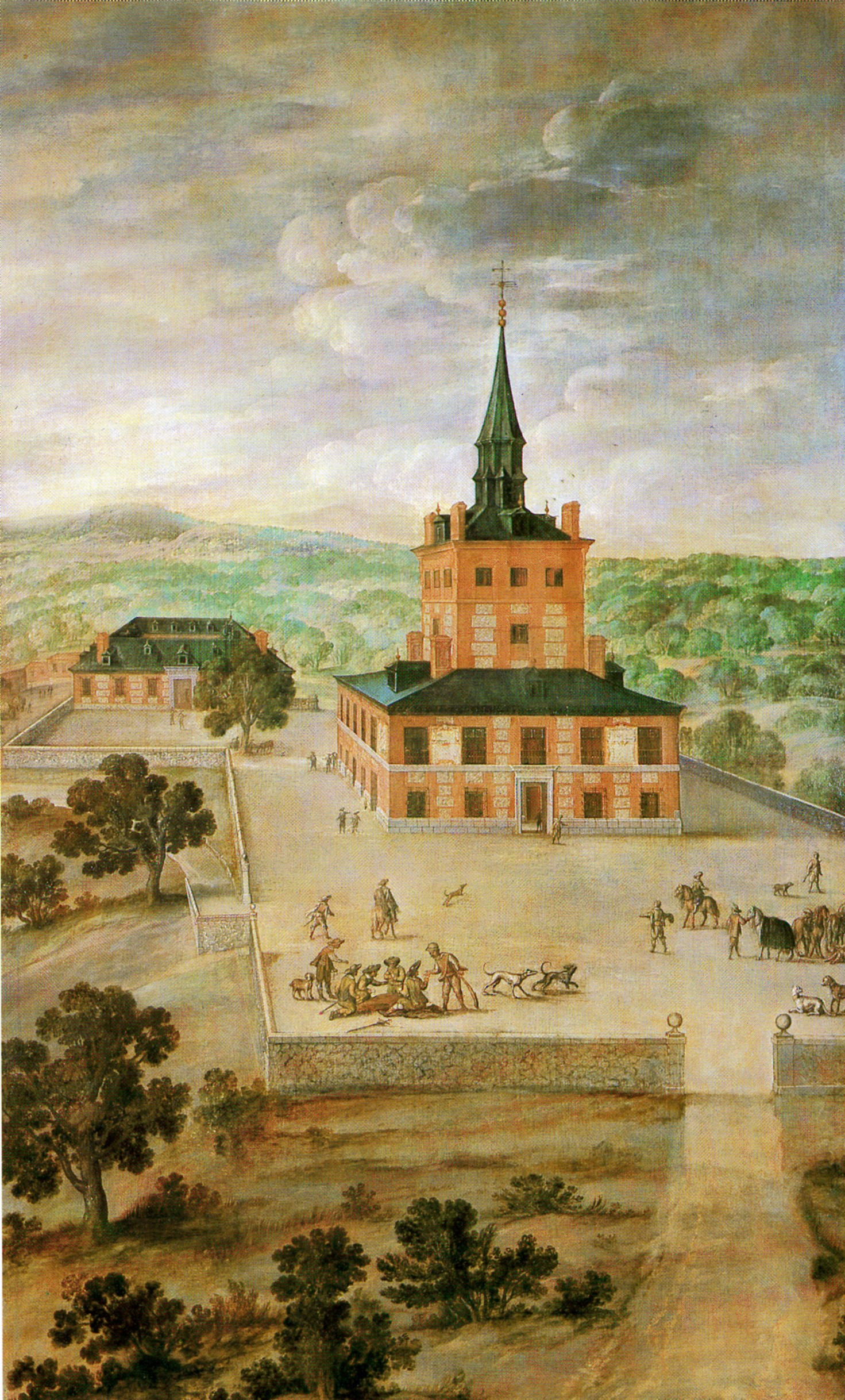
Torre de la Parada by Felix Castello c. 1640

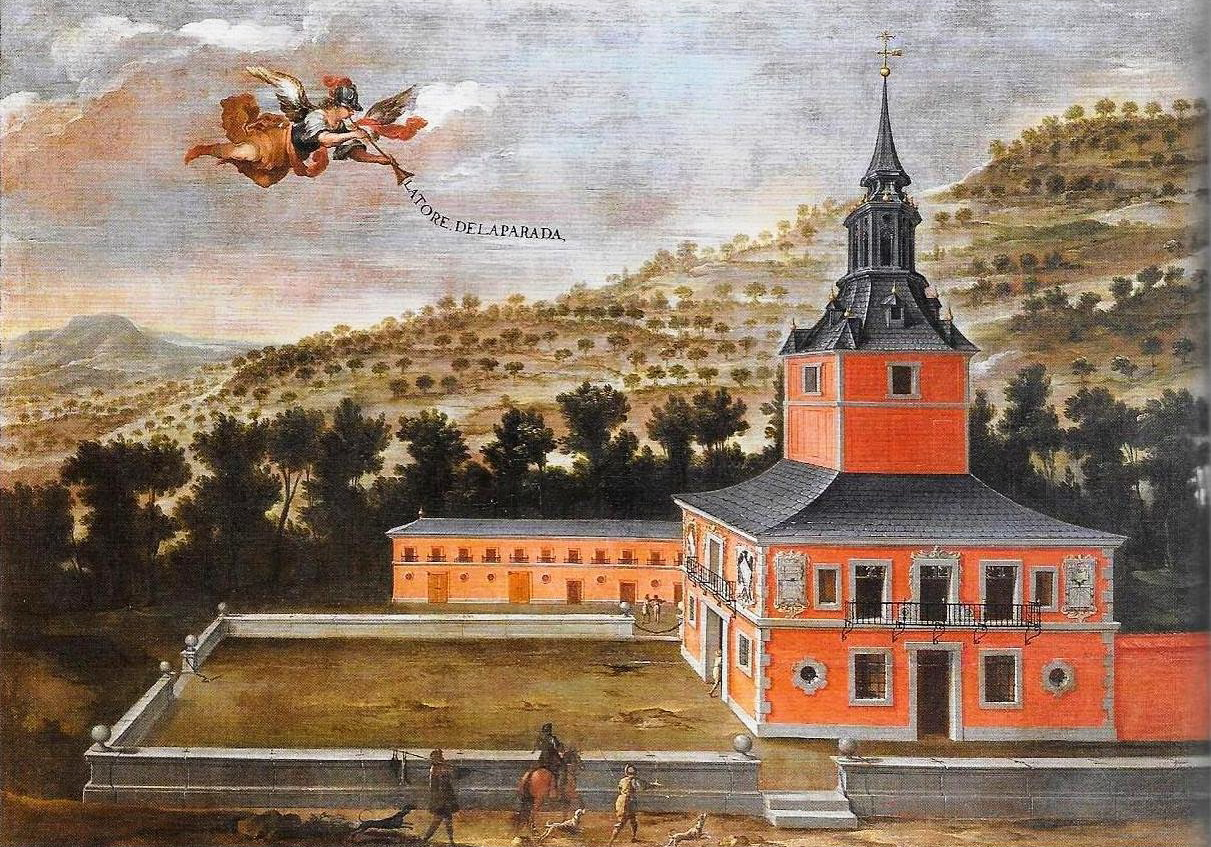
Torre de la Parada, c. 1670.

The Torre de la Parada is a former hunting lodge that was located in present-day Monte de El Pardo in Fuencarral-El Pardo, near the Royal Palace of El Pardo, some way outside Madrid in the Sierra de Guadarrama. It was mostly destroyed by fire when taken in 1714 by Austrian troops in the War of Spanish Succession, though the ruins remain.

== History ==
It was first built in 1547–1549, with Luis de Vega as the architect. During the years 1635–1640 it was a site for a major architectural and decorative project by King Philip IV of Spain who was a great hunting enthusiast. He commissioned the Spanish architect Juan Gómez de Mora to renovate it in 1636, and had it decorated by leading painters, including Rubens and Velázquez, who contributed some of his "jester" portraits, including The Jester Don John of Austria, The Jester Don Diego de Acedo, Portrait of Francisco Lezcano and Portrait of Pablo de Valladolid. His Aesop and Menippus are also thought to have been intended for the lodge, as well as several of his well-known portraits of the royal family relaxed in hunting or riding clothes, including Prince Balthasar Charles as a Hunter.

Rubens was commissioned in 1636 to produce sixty mythological paintings, which he managed to do in about 18 months, assisted by Jacob Jordaens, Cornelis de Vos, Peter Snayers, Thomas Willeboirts Bosschaert, Theodoor van Thulden, Jan Boeckhorst and others, working to his designs. Forty of the paintings survive, as well as many of Rubens' oil sketches and drawings. Most of these works are in the Prado in Madrid.

The best paintings were later moved elsewhere, especially in 1710, but in 1806 a travel book describes paintings by the Flemish painters Paul de Vos, Erasmus Quellinus II, Thomas Willeboirts Bosschaert, Jan Cossiers, and "Yoris" (possibly Joris van Son who worked with Erasmus Quellinus).
