= Thomas Willeboirts Bosschaert =

Dutch painter (1613–1654)

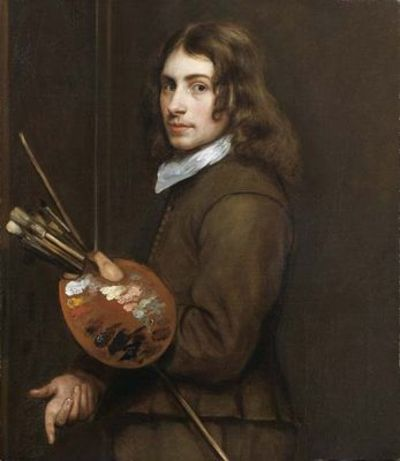
- Thomas Willeboirts Bosschaert self portrait 1637.
- Born: Thomas Willeboirts Bosschaert; 1613; Bergen op Zoom
- Died: 23 January 1654 (aged 40–41); Antwerp
- Known for: Painting
- Movement: Baroque

Thomas Willeboirts Bosschaert (1613 – 23 January 1654) was a Dutch Republic-born Flemish Baroque painter.

== Biography ==
Willeboirts Bosschaert was born in Bergen op Zoom, where his Catholic family had moved in the late sixteenth century. He moved to Antwerp in 1628, and entered the studio of Gerard Seghers for eight years. In 1636 or 1637 he became an Antwerp citizen and joined the Guild of St. Luke. He died in Antwerp.

== Art ==
Willeboirts' style was heavily influenced by Anthony van Dyck, both in history and portrait, leading some scholars to suggest that Willeboirts might have studied in that studio. The artist ran his own studio with at least nine known pupils, and collaborated with other artists of the time such as Daniel Seghers, Paul de Vos, Jan Fyt, Jan van den Hoecke, Frans Snyders, and Adriaen van Utrecht, as well as with Peter Paul Rubens on the decoration series for Philip IV of Spain's Torre de la Parada (1636–1638). Between 1641 and 1647 he also worked for the Dutch stadtholder Frederik Hendrik of Orange. Hendrik's widow, Amalia von Solms also commissioned a work from Willeboirts for the decorations of the Oranjezaal (Orange Room) in the Huis ten Bosch, a decorative program that included both Dutch and Flemish masters. In 1653, a competition was held in Antwerp between him and Cornelis Schut to create an altarpiece with money that had been allocated for Van Dyck before his death; Willeboirts lost to Schut's painting, The Martyrdom of St. George.

Willeboirts made the grisaille centerpieces for two of Daniel Seghers garland paintings. For one of these Seghers was awarded with a solid gold maulstick, and Willeboirts was given a hundred guilders.

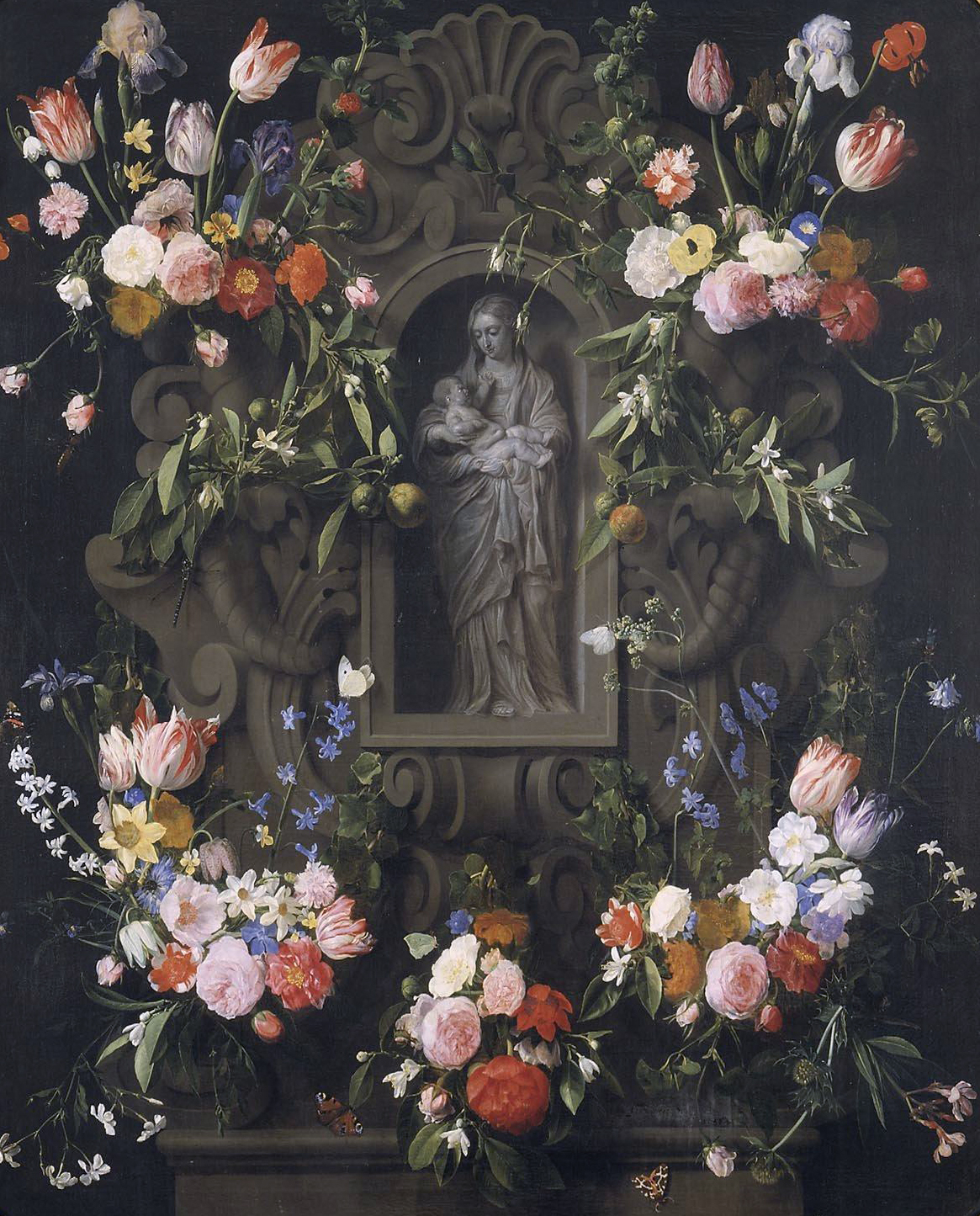
Daniel Seghers Garland with Virgin, 1645, paid for with gold maulstick.

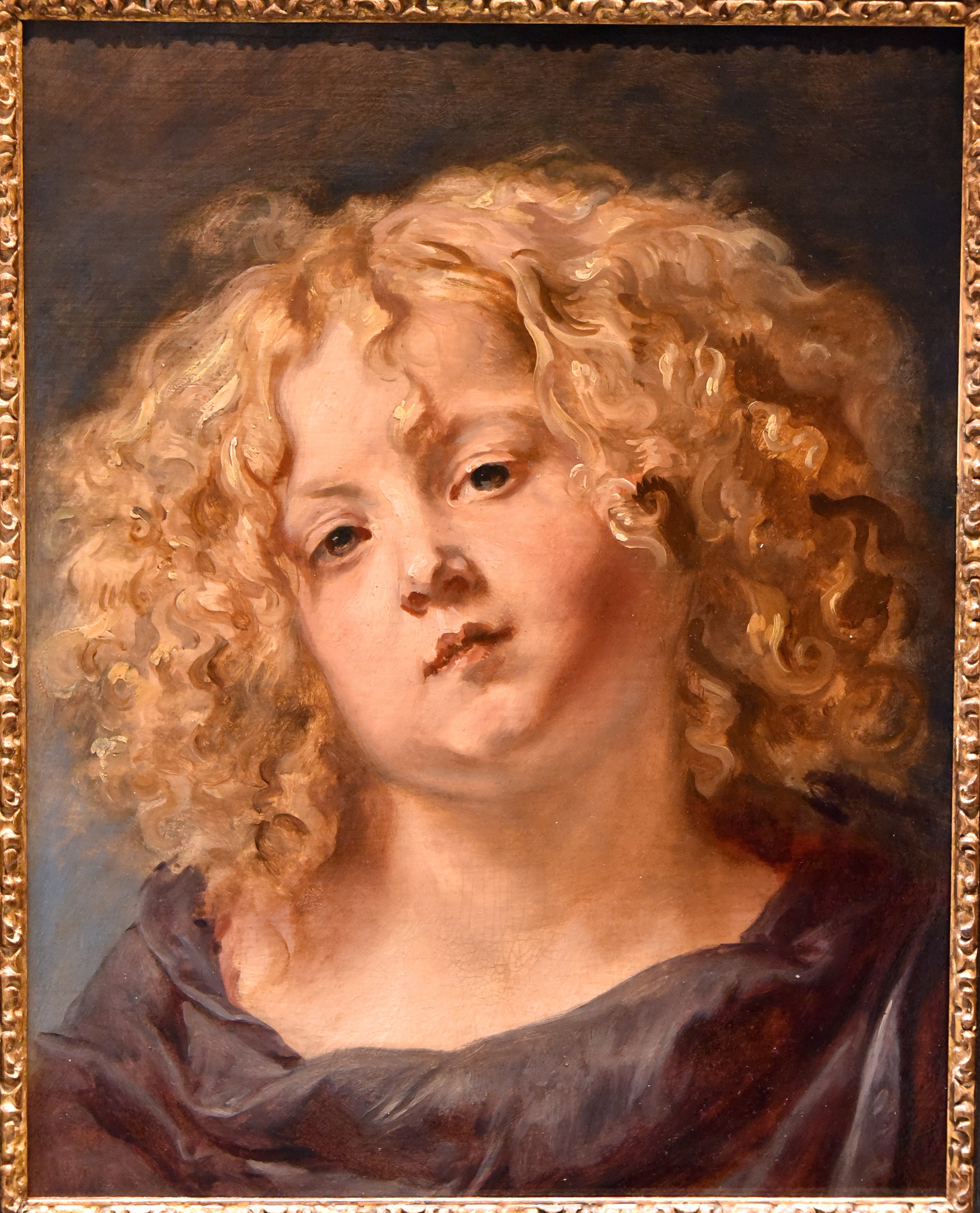
Study of a Boy's Head, 1644–1645, by Thomas Willeboirts Bosschaert. Nationalmuseum, Stockholm, Sweden
