= Hendrick van Balen =

Hendrick van Balen may refer to:

- Hendrick van Balen the Elder (1573/75–1632), Flemish painter
- Hendrick van Balen the Younger (1623–1661), Flemish painter, son of Hendrick van Balen the Elder
