= Tigress with Her Cubs =

1620 painting attributed to Peter Paul Rubens or Jan Wildens

Tigress with Her Cubs is a 1620 Flemish oil painting, attributed either to Peter Paul Rubens or Jan Wildens. It is now in the Akademie der Bildenden Kunste, Vienna.
