= Jan Boeckhorst =

German-born Flemish Baroque painter and draughtsman (c. 1604–1668)

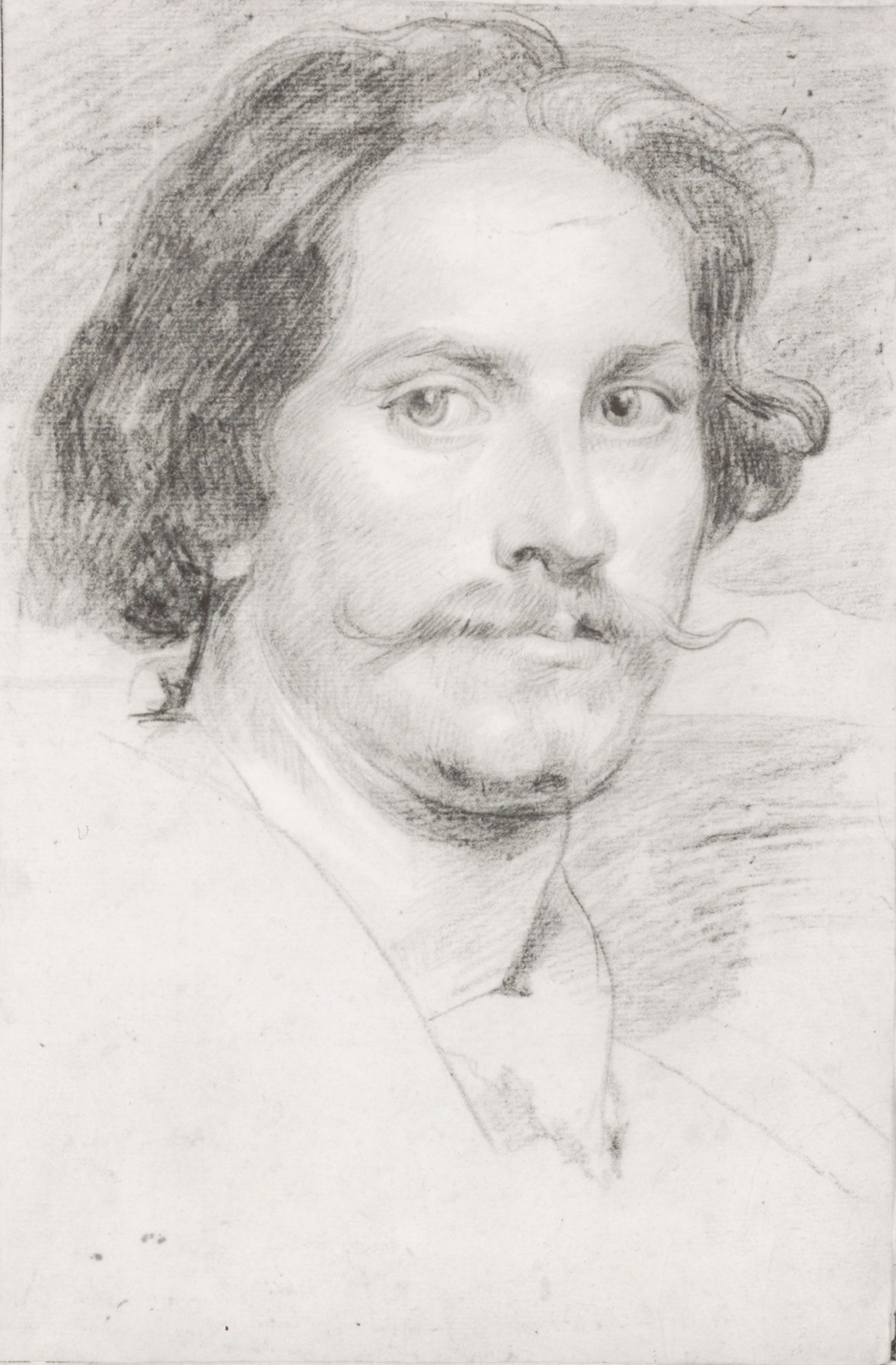
- Portrait of Jan Boeckhorst by Abraham van Diepenbeeck after van Dyck
- Born: Johann Bockhorst circa 1604; Münster, Westphalia
- Died: 21 April 1668 (aged 64); Antwerp
- Known for: Painting
- Movement: Baroque

Jan Boeckhorst or Johann Bockhorst (c. 1604 – 21 April 1668) was a German-born Flemish Baroque painter and draughtsman who worked most of his career in Antwerp. He was a versatile artist who produced history paintings, genre scenes and portraits in a style influenced by the trio of leading Antwerp painters Peter Paul Rubens, Anthony van Dyck and Jacob Jordaens. Boeckhorst also worked as a designer of cartoons for tapestries.

== Life ==
Jan Boeckhorst was born in Münster, Westphalia as the second-oldest of twelve children. His family belonged to Münster’s highly respected citizens (Honoratioren) and his father Heinrich was for a while the mayor of Münster. Jan Boeckhorst became a canon in the Jesuit order at age 17. He only started his artistic study when he was about twenty-two years of age.

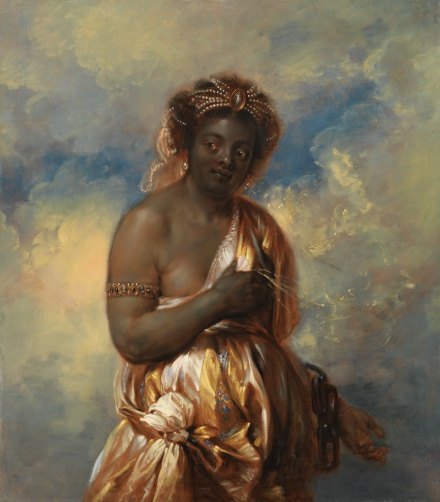
Allegory of Africa

In the mid 1620s Boeckhorst moved to Antwerp apparently to study with Peter Paul Rubens. There is no firm evidence that Boeckhorst actually studied under Rubens, only a statement by Rubens’ nephew Philip to that effect. However, a close relationship between the artists during the 1630s is documented. Boeckhorst likely also briefly trained with Jordaens during Rubens' stay in London in the late 1620s. In Antwerp, Boeckhorst was known as Lange Jan (Tall John) because of his tall stature.

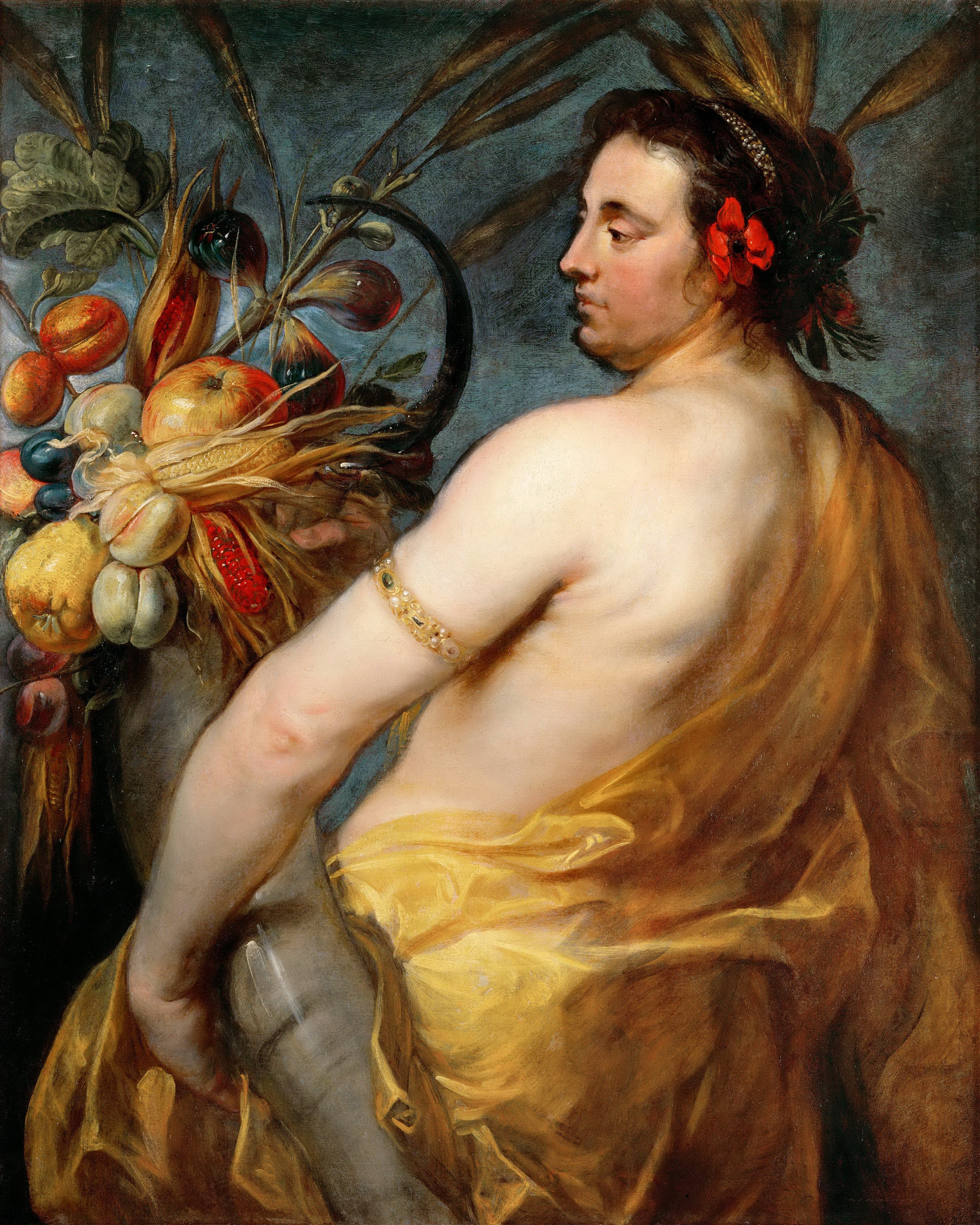
Ceres, Allegory of Summer

From 1626 to 1635 Boeckhorst worked on a commission paid for by the devout merchant Lodewijk De Roomer to complete 26 works for a chapel in the Falcon monastery in central Antwerp (or for St. Joseph’s chapel in the Antwerp convent of St. Augustine). These works on which he collaborated with Jan Wildens are now lost. Between 1627 and 1632 he likely worked closely with Anthony van Dyck who was during that period back in Antwerp after a long stay abroad. The two artists collaborated on individual works of art while Boeckhorst also produced copies after van Dyck.

Boeckhorst became a master in the Antwerp Guild of Saint Luke in 1633–1634. He was a regular collaborator with Rubens in the mid 1630s. He first worked on the decorations for the 1635 Joyous Entry (the so-called 'Pompa Introitus') into Antwerp of the new governor of the Habsburg Netherlands Cardinal-Infante Ferdinand. Rubens was in overall charge of this project. For the Pompa Introitus Broeckhorst contributed architectural elements on the 'Arch of Isabella' and the figures of 'Securitas' and 'Salus publica' in collaboration with Gerard Seghers and Jan Borchgraef.

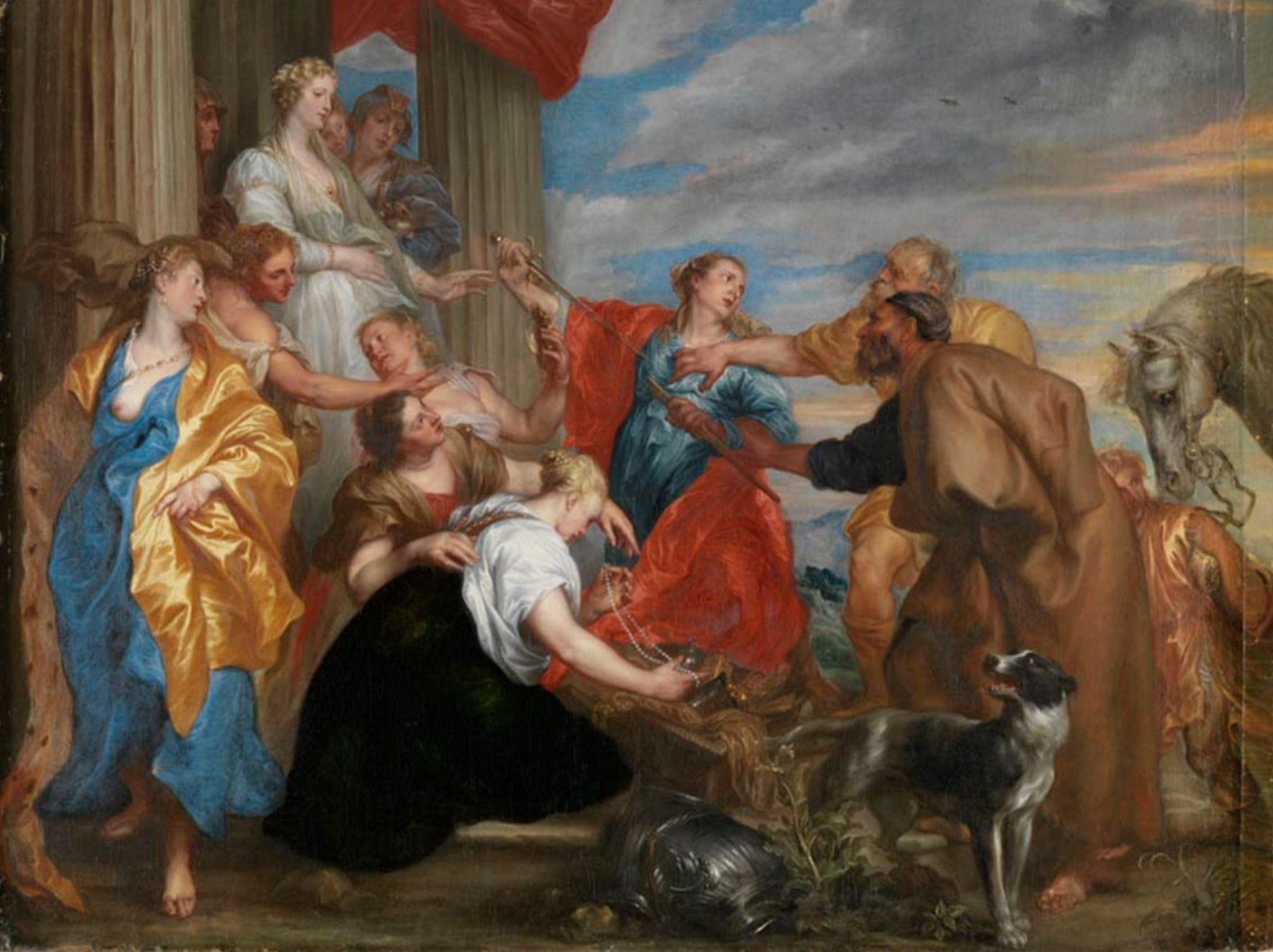
Achilles amongst the Daughters of Lycomedes

Boeckhorst traveled to Italy in 1635. He returned to Antwerp and in the period 1636–1638 he collaborated with Rubens’ workshop on a large commission to make mythological decorations for the hunting pavilion Torre de la Parada of the Spanish king Philip IV near Madrid. For this project Jan Boeckhorst painted decorations after oil sketches by Rubens.

In 1639 Boeckhorst traveled to Italy again where he resided in Rome. In Rome he likely joined the circle of Dutch and Flemish artists in Rome known as the Bentvueghels. It was the custom among the Bentvueghels to adopt a nickname. Boeckhorst's nickname was possibly Doctor Faustus.

The date of his return to Antwerp is not known with certainty and estimates vary from 1639 to 1649. It is known that he completed a few unfinished works of Rubens' after Rubens' death in 1640. After his return to Antwerp he received multiple commissions from religious institutions in Flanders including for the Saint James Church in Bruges and the Saint Michael's Church and Saint James Church in Ghent.

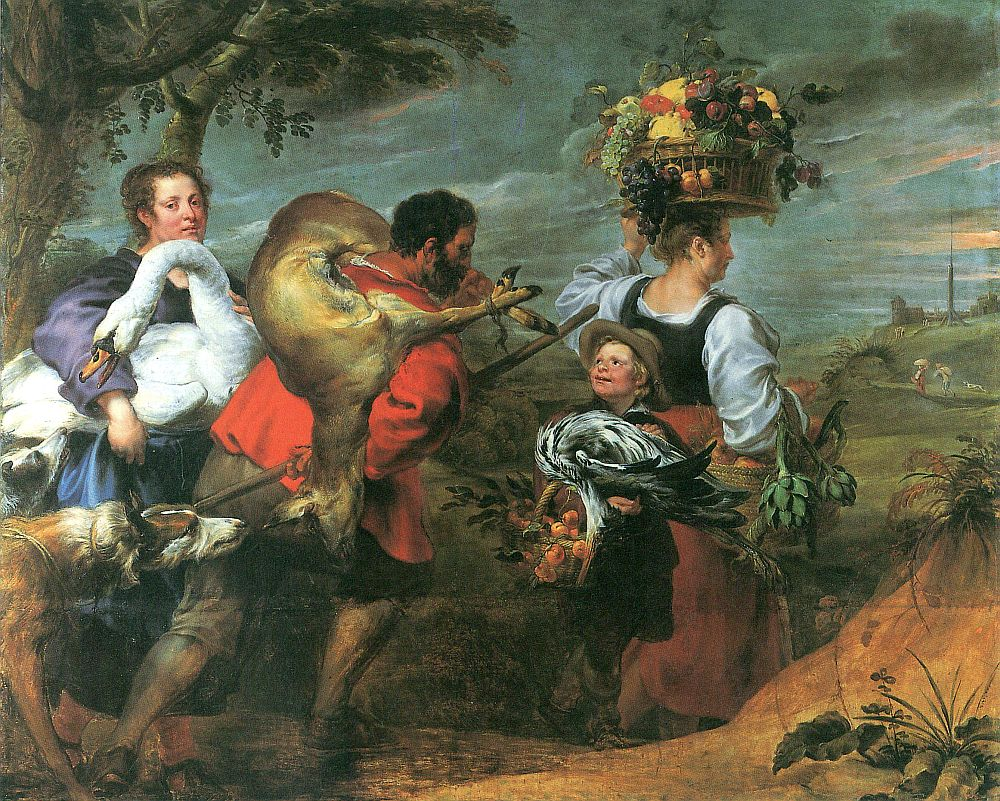
Peasants on their way to the market

Jan Boeckhorst died on 21 April 1668 in Antwerp where he was buried in the Saint James Church. His large collection was sold after his death in a sale which lasted six days and raised the considerable sum of 6,026 guilders. His collection included a complete set of early drawings of Rubens.

== Work ==
=== General ===
Boeckhorst was a versatile painter who produced history paintings on religious and mythological subjects, allegorical works, genre scenes and portraits. Boeckhorst also worked as a designer of cartoons for tapestries. He is known to have designed eight tapestries on the myths of Apollo. The Musée Mont-de-Piété in Bergues preserves 8 preliminary drawings for this Apollo series of tapestries.

Boeckhorst also provided designs for the Antwerp publishers. In the early 1650s he provided several designs for the Breviarium Romanum and 9 border decorations for the Missale Romanum, all engraved by Cornelis Galle the Younger and published by the Plantin Press in Antwerp.File:Sibylle phrygienne (Boeckhorst).jpg

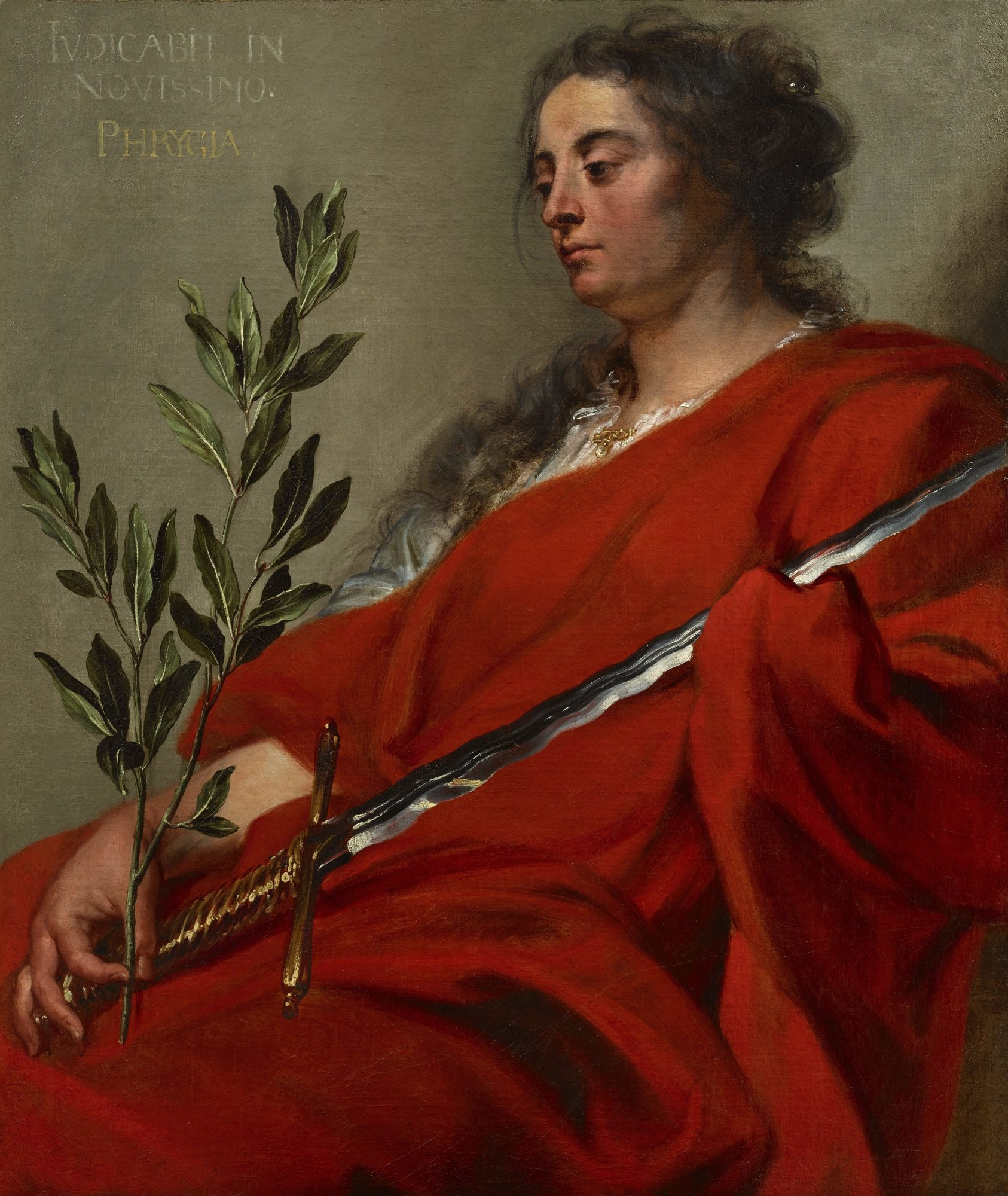
The Sibyl of Phrygia

There only exist three signed and dated paintings (dated between 1646 and c. 1660) and five that are dated only from 1659–1666. The first signed painting, a Madonna and Child with Saint John is dated 1646, about 20 years after his arrival in Antwerp. Because of the few number of signed paintings it has been difficult to attribute works to Boeckhorst with certainty and some attributions are contested among art historians.

=== Collaborations ===
As was common practice among Antwerp painters, Boeckhorst often collaborated as a figure painter on compositions with landscape painters Jan Wildens and Jan Brueghel the Younger and still life painter Frans Snyders. An example is the Peasants going to the market (Rubenshuis, Antwerp) on which he collaborated with Frans Snyders. This genre scene, which also acts as an allegory of the four elements, is of a monumentally large scale at 217.5 cm in height and 272.5 cm in width. The work shows the influence of Jordaens' genre paintings.

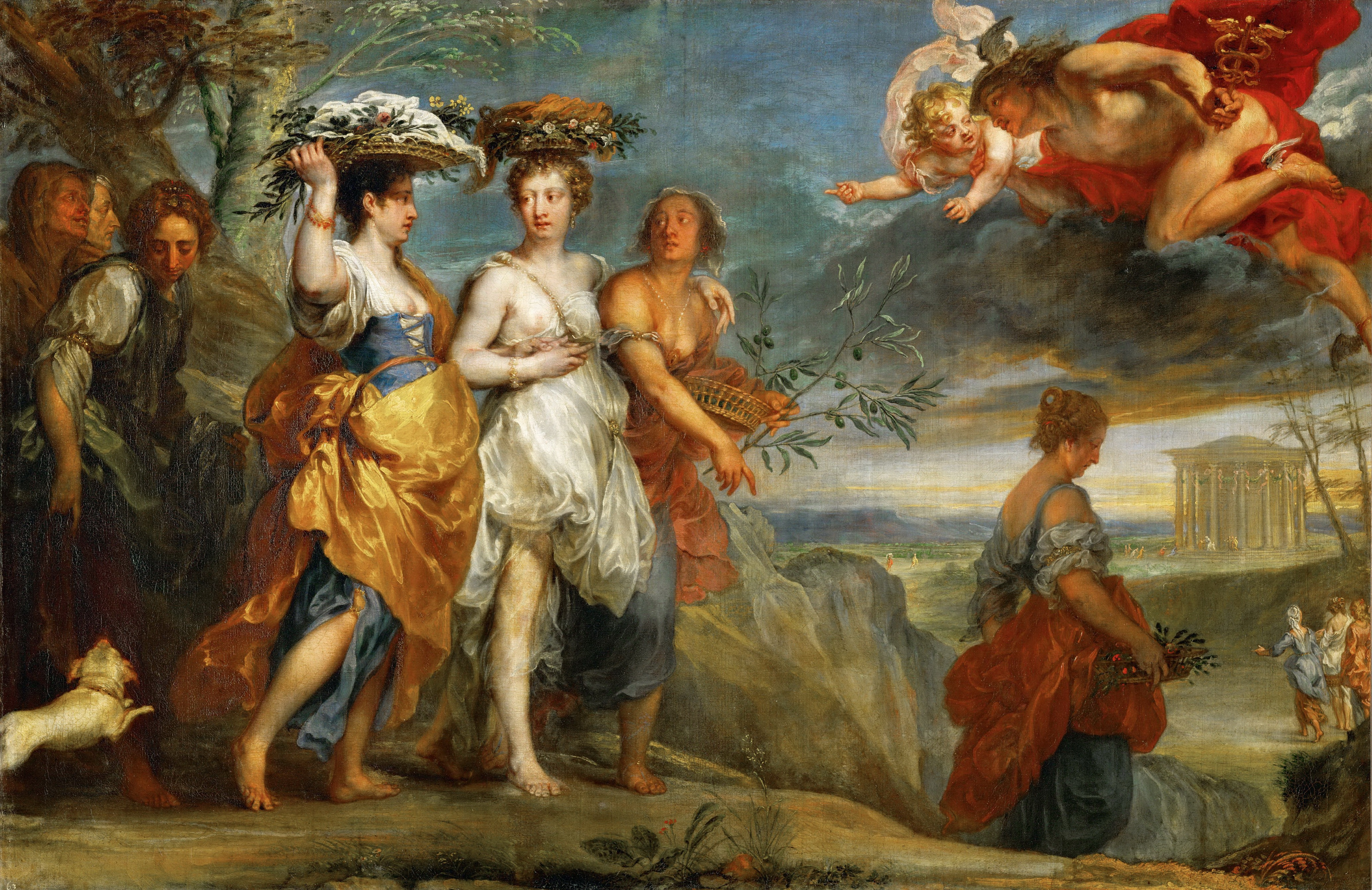
Mercury beholds Herse

Boeckhorst may have collaborated on devotional garland paintings. Garland paintings are a special type of still life developed in Antwerp by Jan Brueghel the Elder in collaboration with the Italian cardinal Federico Borromeo at the beginning of the 17th century. The genre was initially connected to the visual imagery of the Counter-Reformation movement and typically involved a collaboration between a figure painter and a still life painter. No collaborations with Boeckhorst on garland paintings have been attributed with certainty.

Boeckhorst is believed to have made changes to works by Rubens. He did so with a tronie painted by Rubens around 1613 called King David playing the Harp (Städel, Frankfurt am Main). The second Rubens tronie of c. 1616/17, which Boeckhorst transformed around 1640/41 into a bust-length format was the Head of a bearded man in profile holding a bronze figure (Christie’s, London, 2 July 2013, lot 30). He possibly also enlarged Rubens’ Rise of the Blessed at the request of Jan Wildens in order to form a pendant with the Fall of the Damned then in Wildens’ own collection. After the late 1630s Boeckhorst's collaborations appear to have ceased.

=== Portraits ===
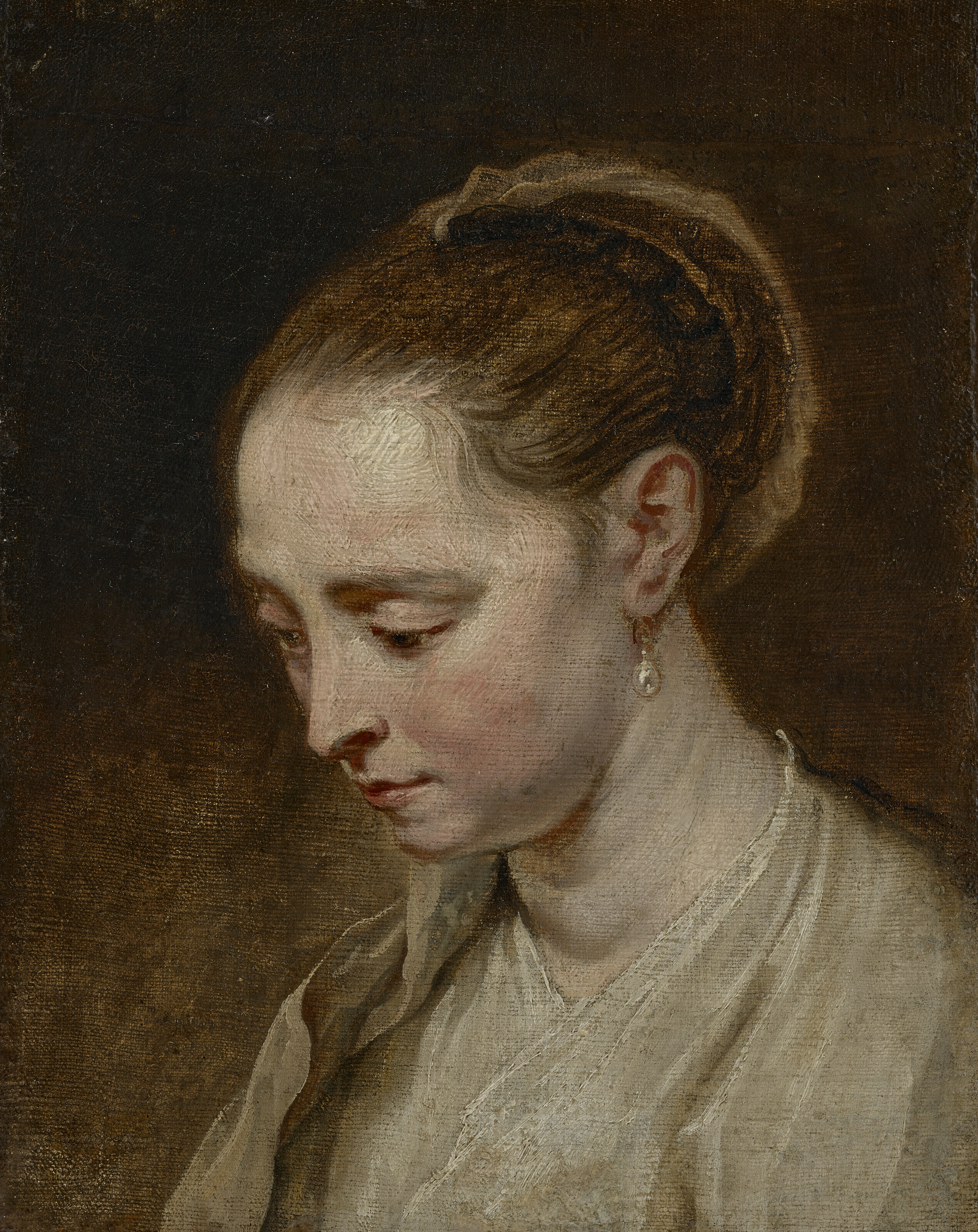
Head study of a young woman with a pearl earring

Boeckhorst's portraits are influenced by Anthony van Dyck and Cornelis de Vos, the two leading portrait painters in the first half of the 17th century. He occasionally painted lively group portraits.

Central in his group portraits is the emphasis on the virtue of strong family bonds, the so-called 'Concordia familiae'. Boeckhorst was skilled in depicting his models in a spontaneous and lively manner. His portraits are of an informal character. He also used backdrop draperies, which in imitation of Jordaens, were represented very vividly.

=== Later works ===
His later works from the 1650s and 1660s include numerous altarpieces for churches throughout Flanders and designs of cartoons for tapestries. The expressiveness of van Dyck's figures and use of colors, such as in Ulysses discovers Achilles dressed up as a girl (Alte Pinakothek, Munich), is also noticeable in works from this period.
