= Abraham van Blijenberch =

Flemish painter

Abraham van Blijenberch (or Blyenberch) (1575/6 - 1624) was a Flemish painter. He was born in the Spanish Netherlands and married in 1615. He became a citizen of Antwerp in 1617, but there is no record of him joining the Guild of Saint Luke (the Antwerp guild of painters) at this time.

He worked in London from 1617 to 1622, where he painted portraits of members of the court of James I, including Prince Charles later Charles I of England, the Lord Chamberlain William Herbert, 3rd Earl of Pembroke, William Drummond of Hawthornden, Sir Robert Kerr, and Ben Jonson. He also produced designs for the Mortlake Tapestry Works.

He returned to Antwerp in 1621 or 1622, where Theodoor van Thulden became a student. He was influenced by Daniel Mijtens.

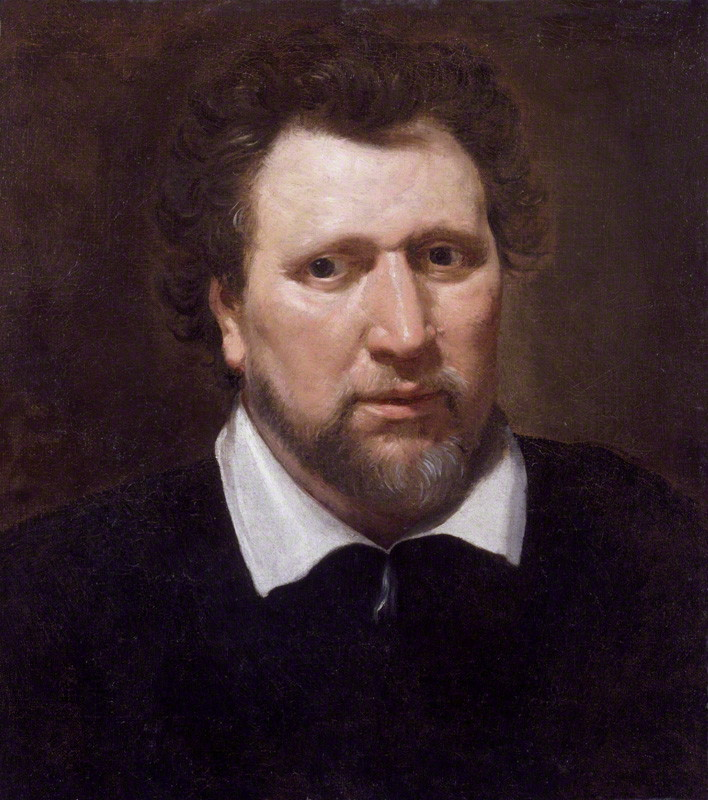
Ben Jonson, after a portrait by Blijenberch c.1617

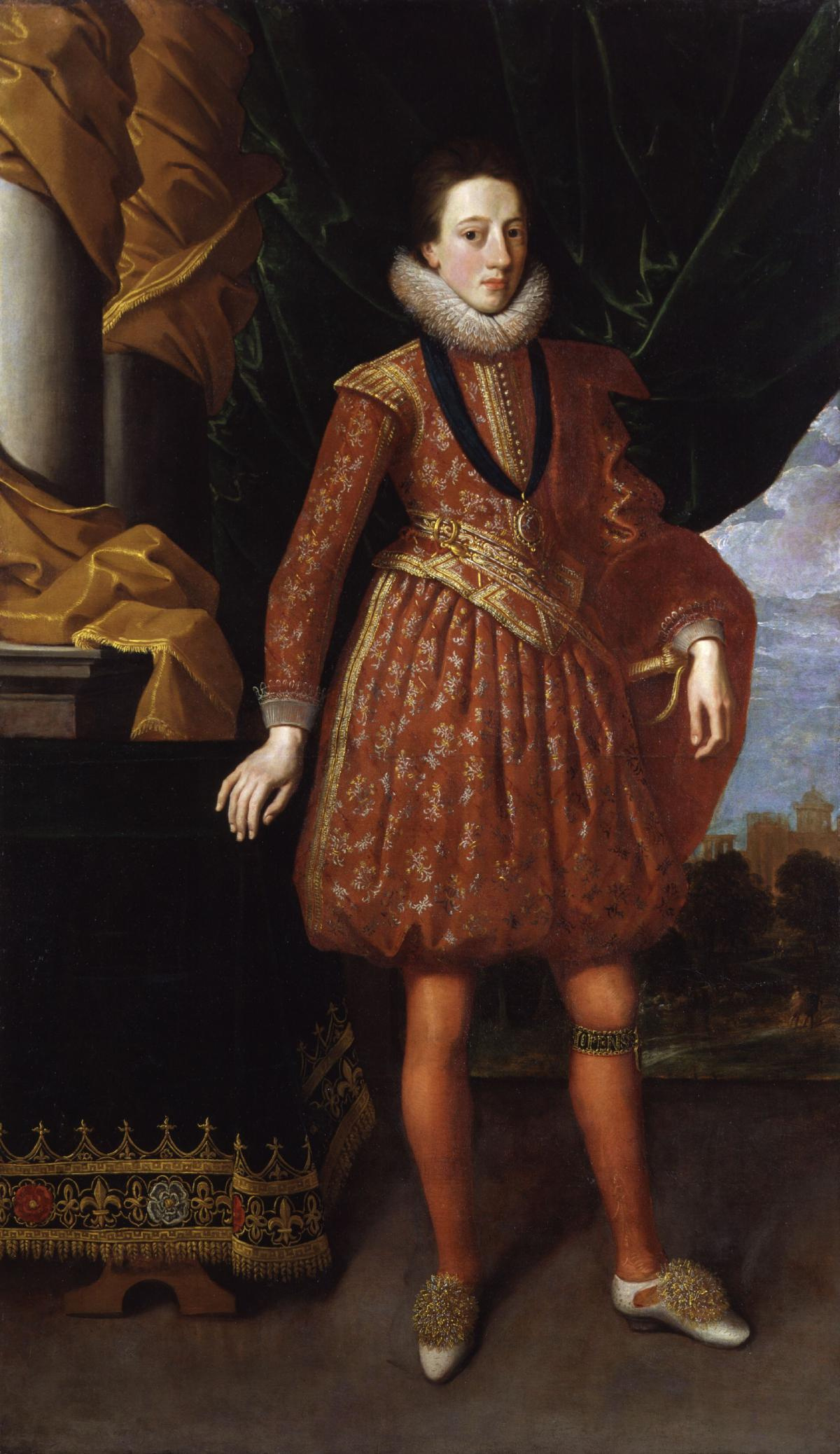
King Charles I, c.1617-1620
