= Paul de Vos =

Flemish painter

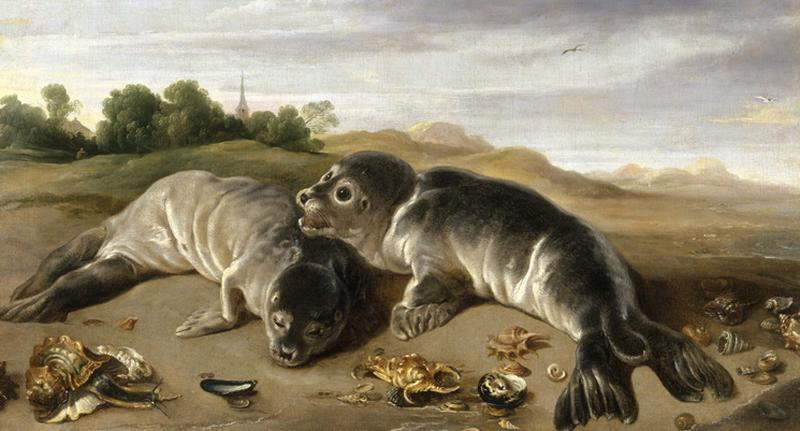
Two young seals on a beach

Paul de Vos (1591/92, or 1595 in Hulst – 30 June 1678 in Antwerp) was a Flemish Baroque painter who specialized in mainly in compositions of animals, hunting scenes and still lifes. He worked for an elite clientele and was a regular collaborator of leading Antwerp painters such as Anthony van Dyck and Peter Paul Rubens.

== Life ==
De Vos was born in Hulst near Antwerp, now in the Dutch province of Zeeland. Little is known of his childhood. His father moved with his family to Antwerp in 1596.

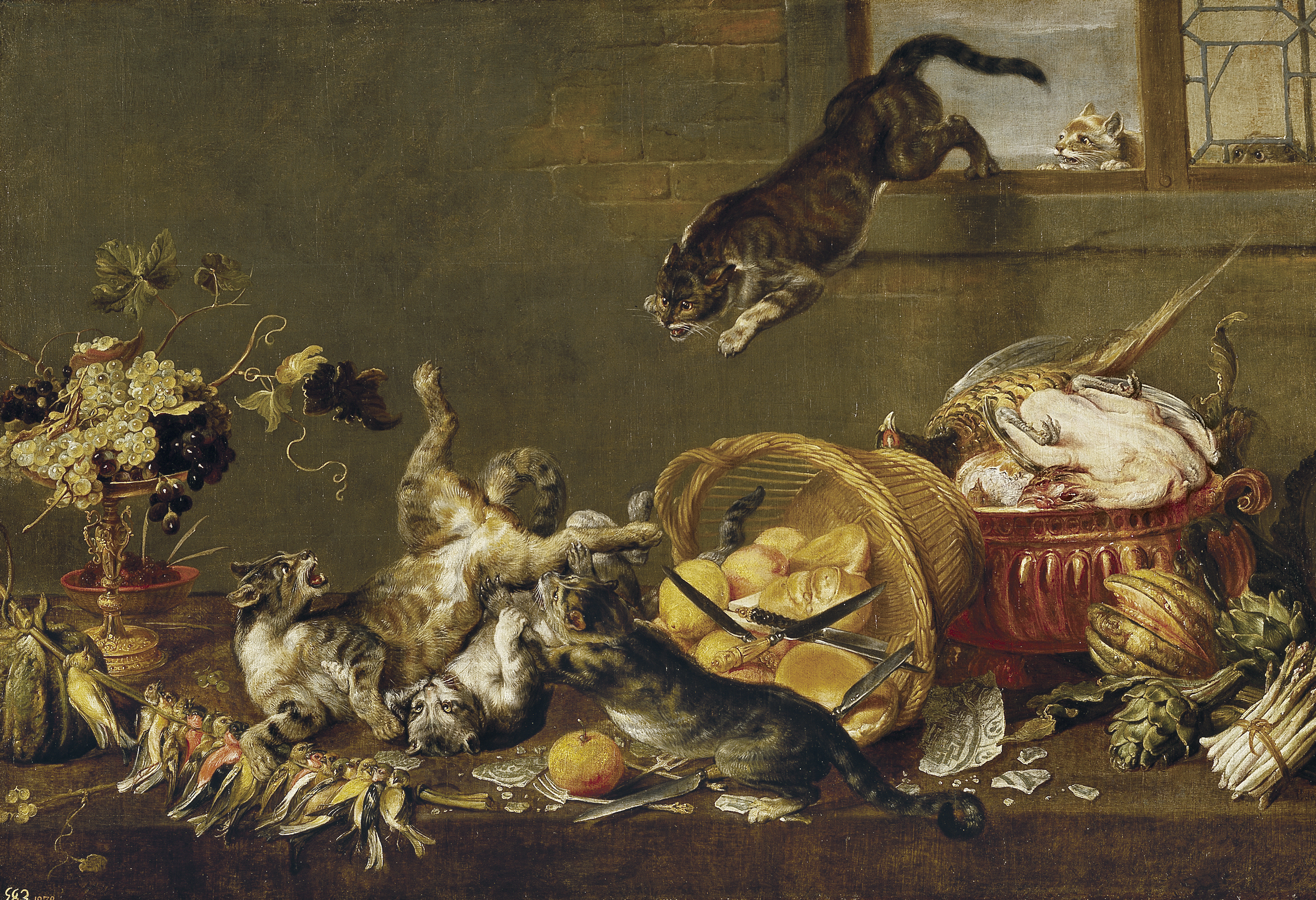
Cats fighting in a larder, Prado Museum

In 1604 Paul de Vos became a pupil of the obscure painter Denijs van Hove in Antwerp. In 1605 he continued his studies under the little-known painter David Remeeus (1559–1626) with whom his older brother Cornelis also trained. He later also trained with the equally obscure Eduard Snayers. De Vos became a master and joined the guild of St. Luke at a late age in 1620, probably because he had initially trained and worked in the workshop of his brother-in-law Frans Snyders who had married his sister Margaretha in 1611.

Paul de Vos married Isabella Waerbeek, a notary's daughter, on 15 Nov 1624 and the couple had 10 children. Peter Paul Rubens was the godfather of one of their sons named Peter Paul born in 1628. The de Vos family prospered and were able to make important investments in real estate in Antwerp.

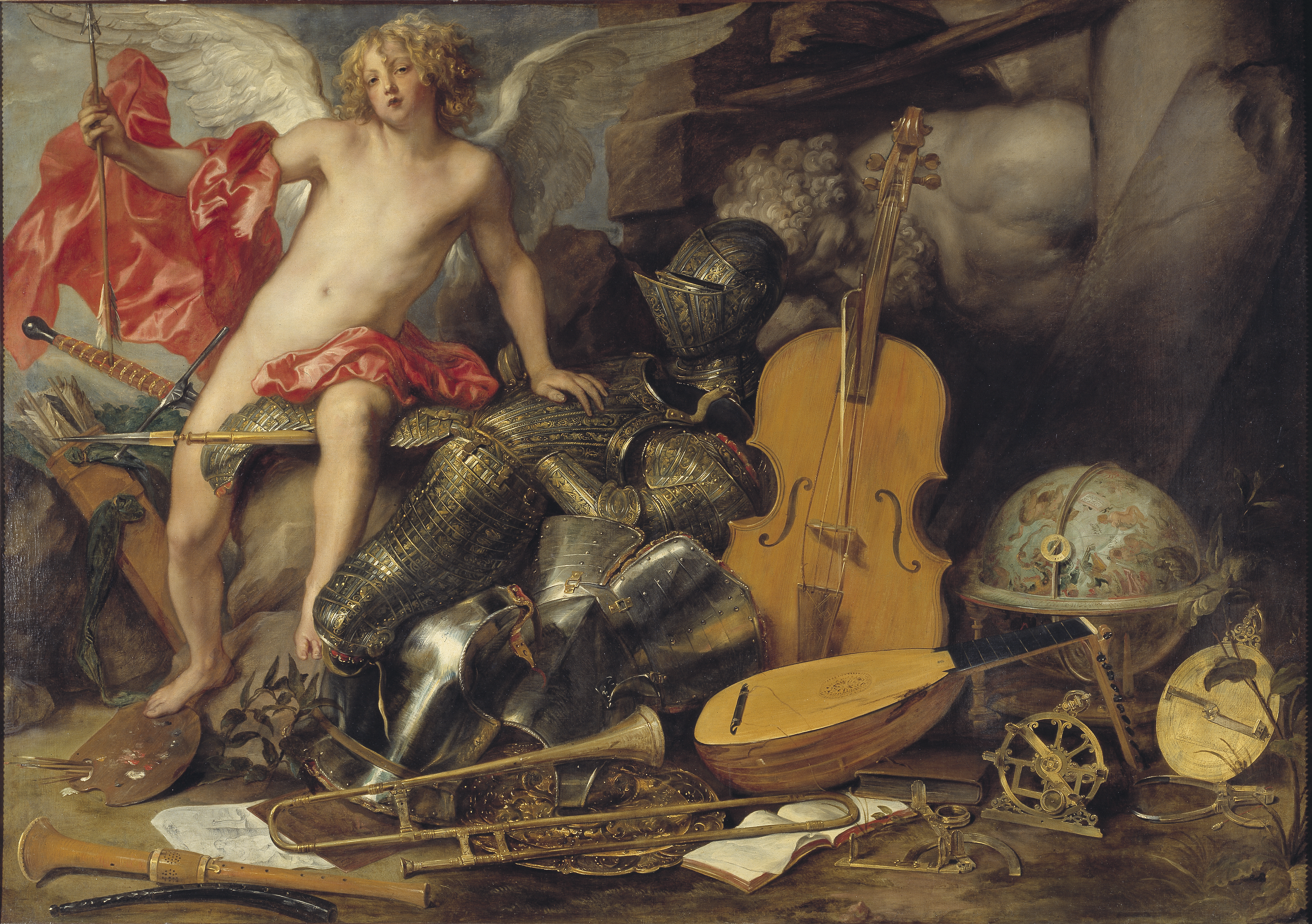
Triumphant Cupid among Emblems of Art and War, with Thomas Willeboirts Bosschaert

De Vos enjoyed the patronage of influential aristocrats in Spain such as the marquis the Leganes, head of the Council of Flanders in Madrid and Philippe-Charles, 3rd Count of Arenberg, then residing in Madrid. From the latter he obtained a commission to paint at least 36 paintings of birds, hunts and fables between 1633 and 1640.

In 1637-1638 he worked on the decorations for the Spanish royal residences, Buen Retiro and Torre de la Parada. Most of the decorations at the Torre de la Parada involving animal scenes without humans were by his hand. The governor of the Governor of the Spanish Netherlands Cardinal-Infante Ferdinand visited his workshop.

He had two pupils: Alex Daemps in 1627 and Lancelot van Daelen in 1636.

== Work ==
De Vos was a prolific artist who produced a large body of work in the categories of large paintings on canvas, drawings and oil sketches. He often signed his paintings but never dated them which makes it difficult to establish a precise chronology. His subject matter was varied and included scenes of pantries, quarrelling dogs, bird concerts and animal fights. He specialized in monumental animal scenes, especially hunts for aristocratic patrons, that are heavily influenced by Frans Snyders. In the past, a lot of his works have been misattributed to Snyders.

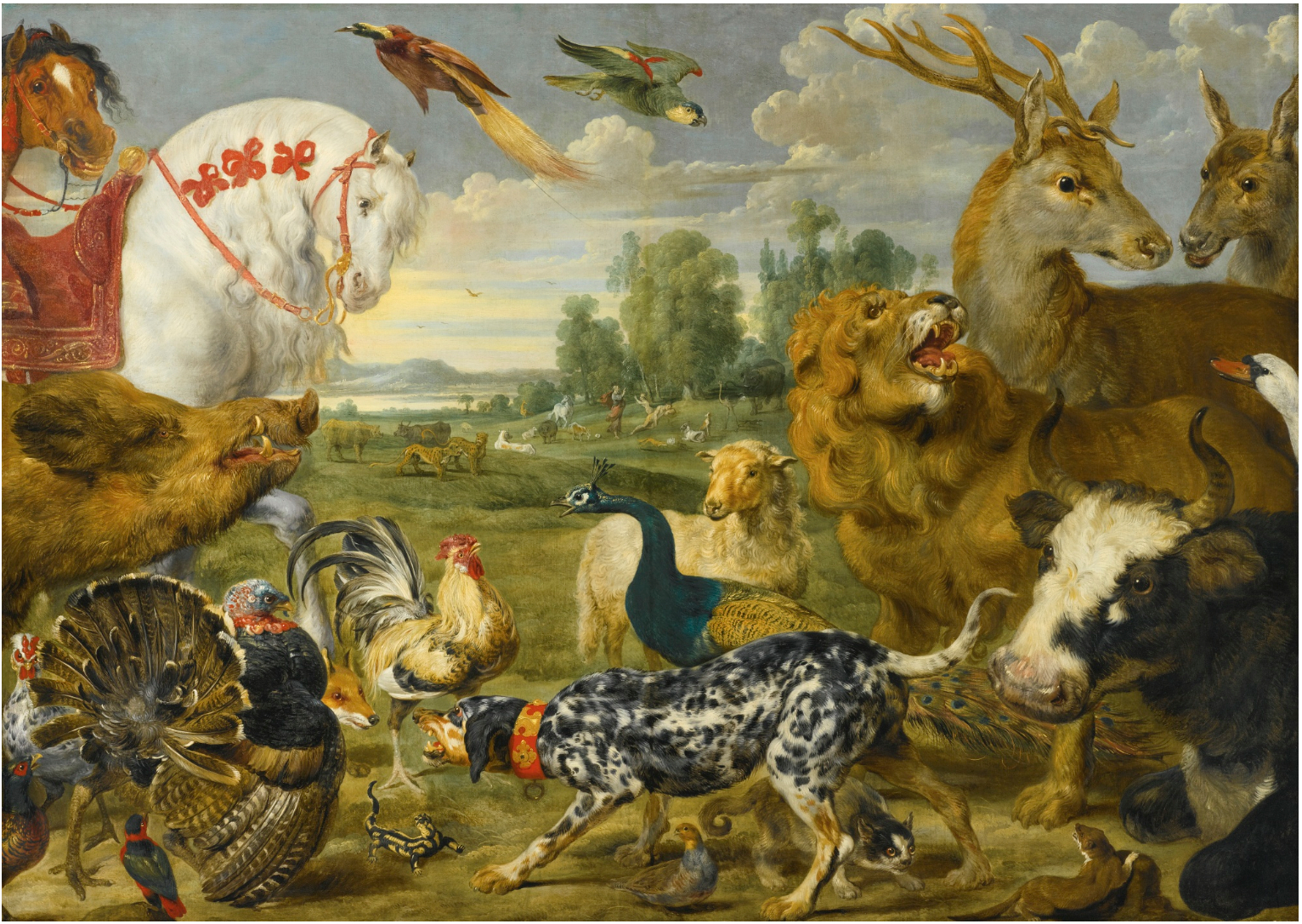
Garden of Eden, with Jan Wildens

De Vos was able to develop his own personal style that accentuated abrupt movement, the gruesome aspects of hunts, used warmer colours and a broader brush stroke than Snyders. He also expanded the iconographic tradition with scenes of fighting cats and horses attacked by wolves.

As was common amongst artists in 17th-century Antwerp, De Vos frequently collaborated with other painters. He collaborated with Rubens, Anthony van Dyck (Rest on the Flight into Egypt, Hermitage Museum, St. Petersburg), Erasmus Quellinus II, Thomas Willeboirts Bosschaert, Adriaen van Utrecht and Jan Wildens. De Vos would typically contribute the animals or still-life elements to the compositions of these painters or would ask landscape specialists such as Jan Wildens to add landscapes to his creations.

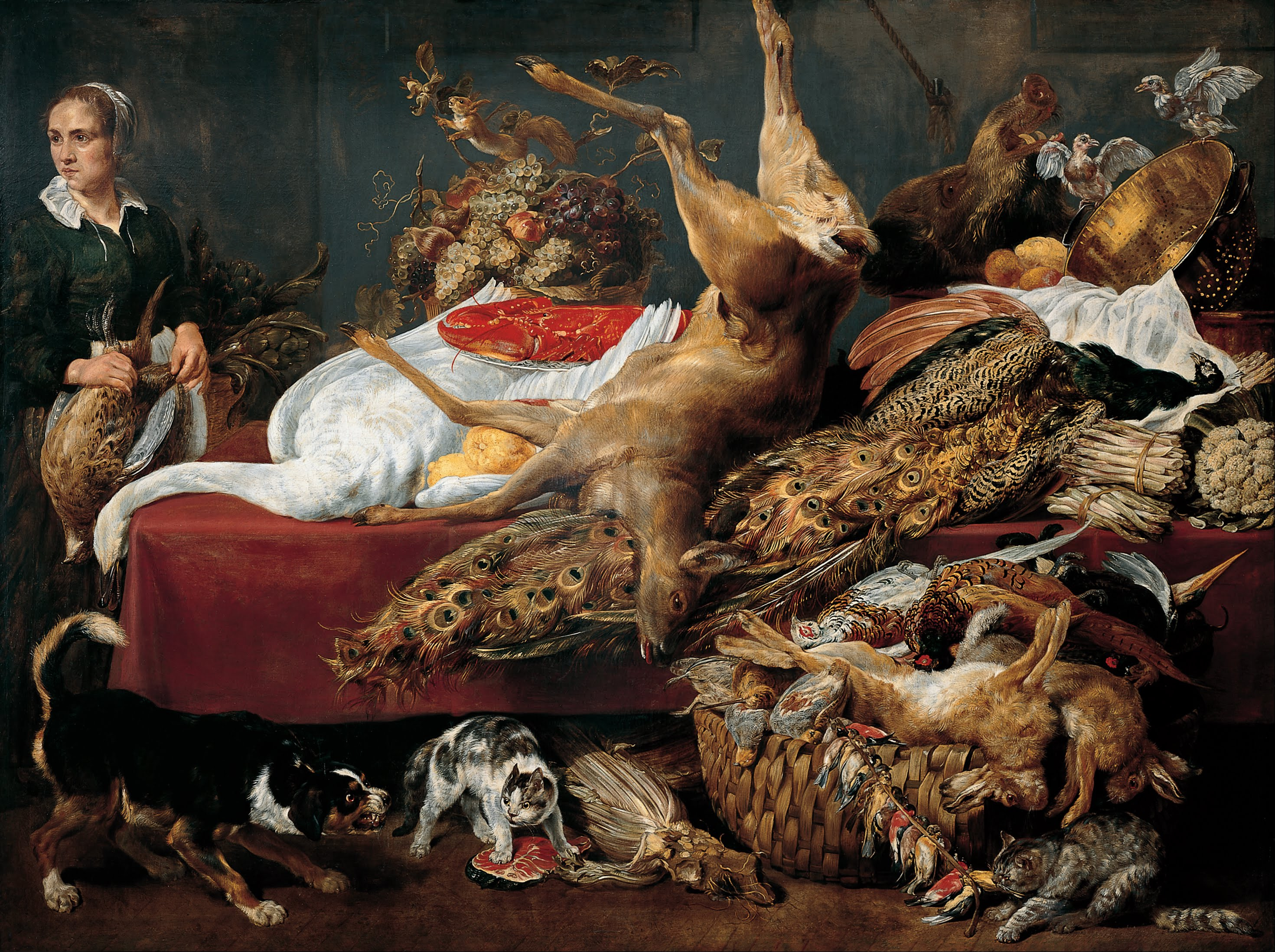
Still life with servant

There are various collaborations recorded with Jan Wildens, who was Paul de Vos' brother-in-law since Paul's brother Cornelis had married Wildens' half-sister Susanna Cock on 27 May 1617. Example of collaborations with Jan Wildens are the compositions Paradise (Kunsthistorisches Museum, Vienna) and Garden of Eden (Auctioned at Sotheby's on 28 January 2016 in New York, lot 30), which resemble the paradise paintings created by Jan Brueghel the Elder.

His collaborations with Rubens consisted mainly of hunting scenes. He was an important contributor on the series of hunting scenes designed by Rubens in the period 1636-1638 for the hunting pavilion Torre de la Parada of the Spanish king Philip IV near Madrid. Many of these are now in the Prado museum.

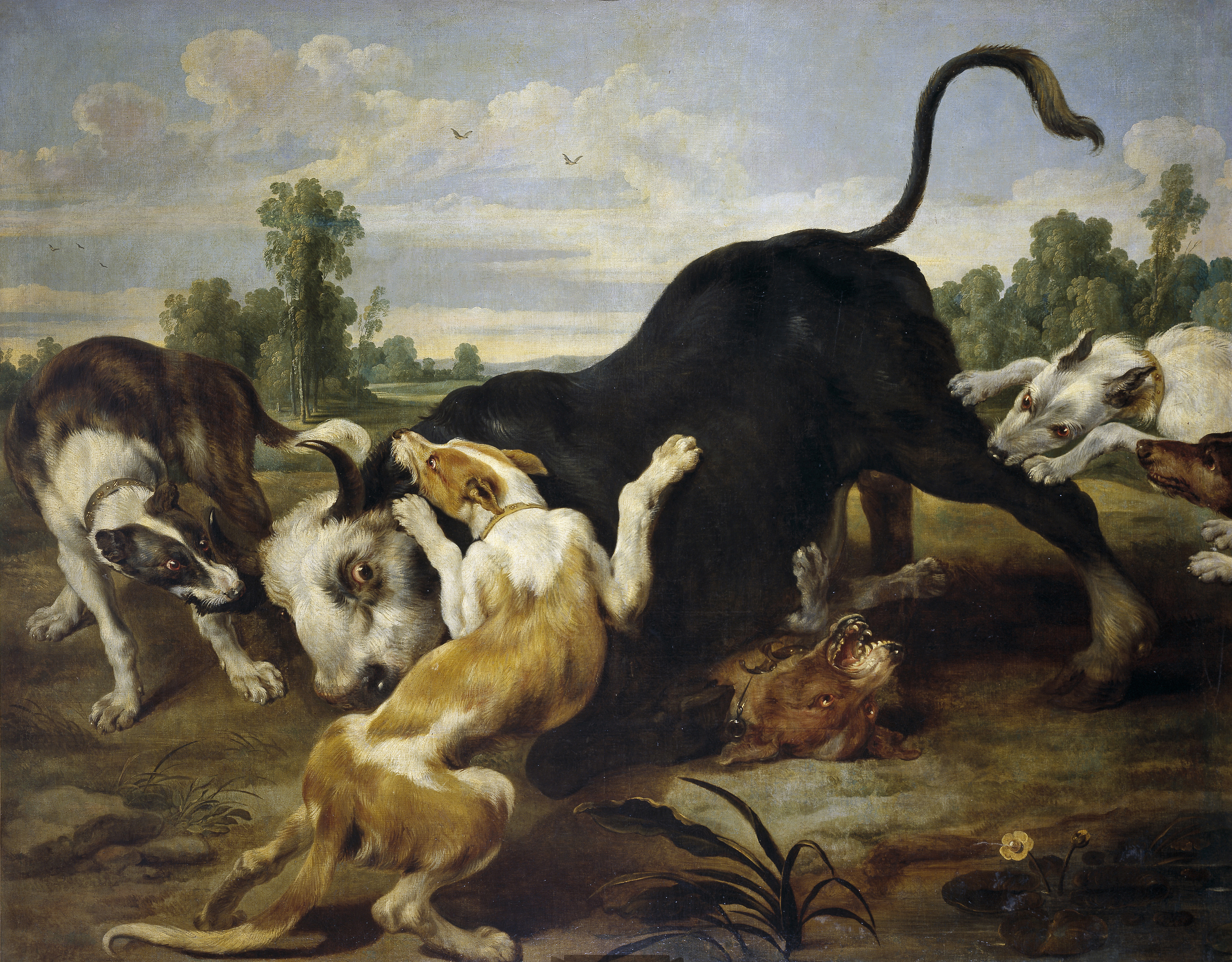
Bull subdued by dogs

One art historian has compared Paul de Vos' contributions to Rubens' hunting scenes with those of Paul Snyders' and found de Vos to be less accurate in the animal anatomy and less accomplished in the psychological expression of the animals. Other art historians regard the hunting scenes of de Vos as more dynamic and evidencing a more personal style when compared with those of Snyders, who was more a still life painter. In their collaboration with Rubens, Snyders and de Vos often worked from sketches made by Rubens while in other cases they were given the freedom to develop their own ideas. The expressive style and motifs of Rubens' animal paintings had an important influence on both Snyders and de Vos. His Fighting peacock and rooster (Museu Calouste Gulbenkian, Lissabon) is included in Willem van Haecht's gallery painting Apelles paints Campaspe (1630, Mauritshuis, Den Haag).

De Vos introduced new motifs into the iconographic tradition in his scenes of fighting cats and horses attacked by wolves.
