= Jan van Balen =

Flemish painter

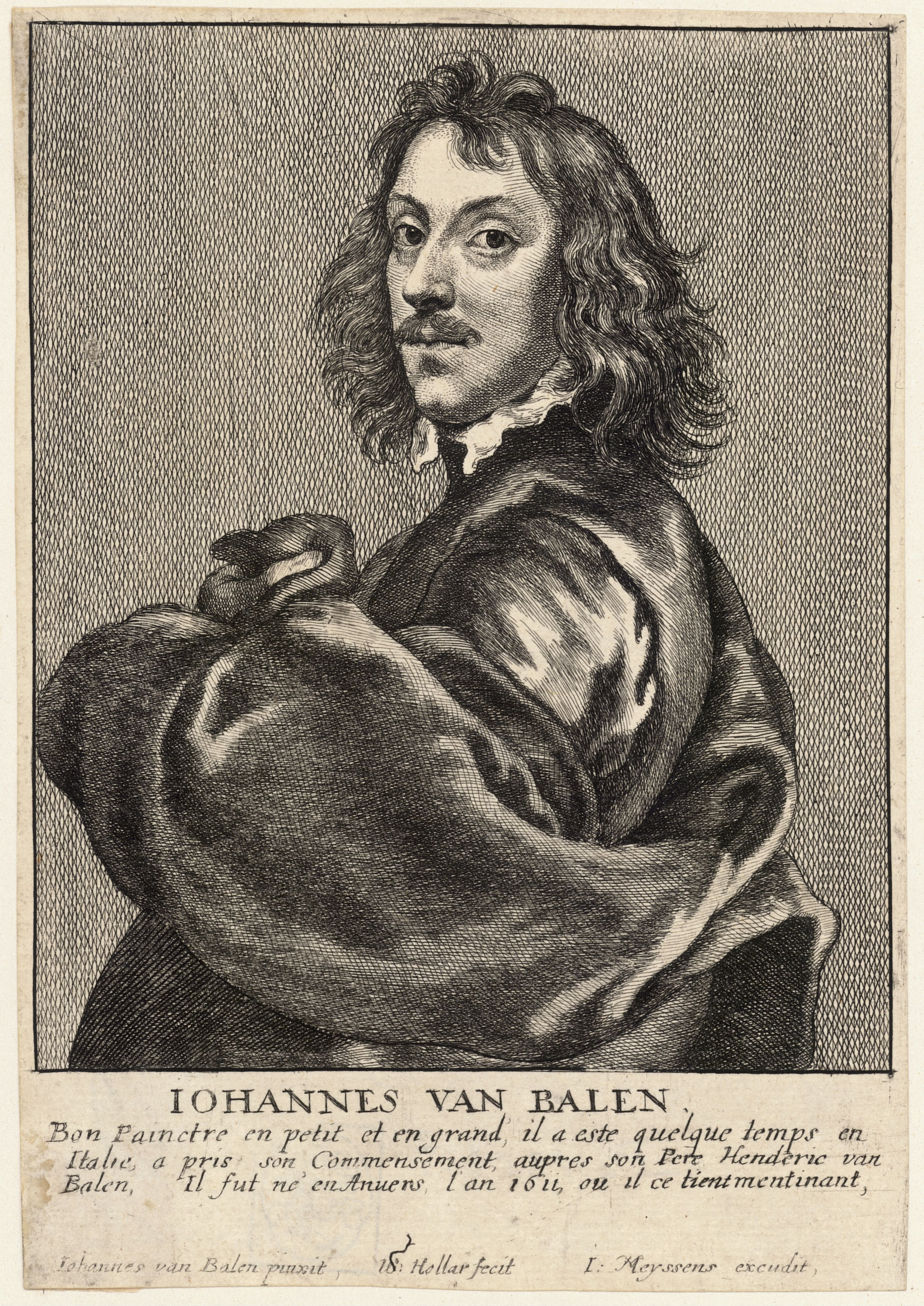
Jan van Balen in Het Gulden Cabinet

Jan van Balen (21 July 1611 in Antwerp – 14 March 1654) was a Flemish painter known for his Baroque paintings of history and allegorical subjects. He also painted landscapes and genre scenes.

== Life ==
Jan van Balen was the son of Hendrick van Balen and Margriet Briers. His father was a prominent painter in Antwerp and played an important role in the renewal of Flemish painting in the early 17th century. He was also one of the teachers of Anthony van Dyck.

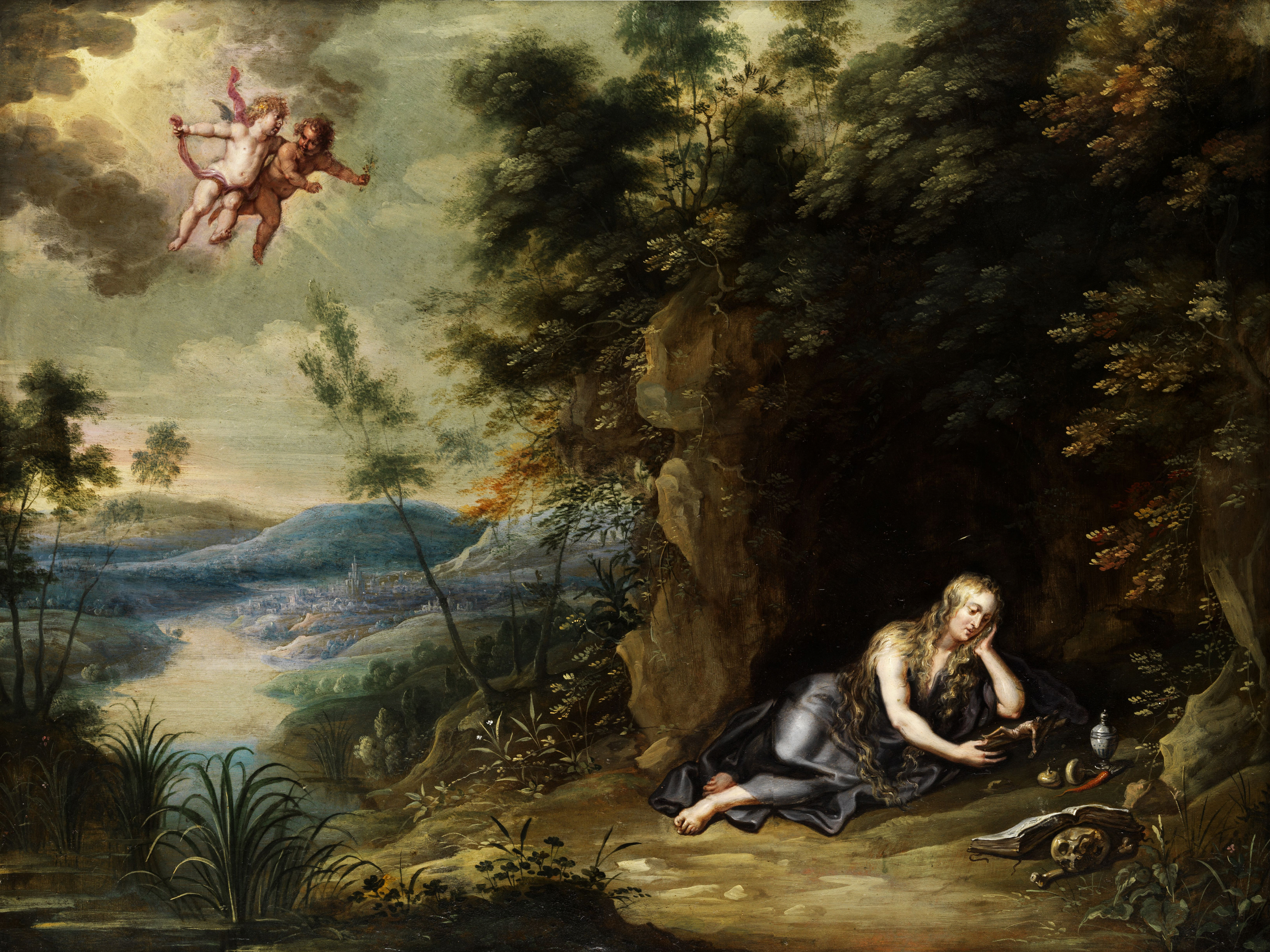
Mary Magdalene as a hermit

Jan van Balen had two brothers, Gaspard (born in 1615) and Hendrik (born in 1620) who were both painters. Jan was the teacher of his two younger brothers. His sister Maria married the painter Theodoor van Thulden.

Jan van Balen trained with his father. He was registered at the Antwerp Guild of Saint Luke as an apprentice in 1631 and as a master in 1639–1640. At the occasion of the Joyous Entry (Pompa Introitus) by the new governor of the Spanish Netherlands Cardinal-Infante Ferdinand into Antwerp in 1635, Jan van Balen collaborated with his brother Gaspard, Theodoor van Thulden, Jan de Labare and Erasmus Quellinus the Younger on the execution of designs for the gallery on the Meir and the triumphal arch at St. John's Church in Antwerp. The overall design of the decorations was under the direction of Rubens.

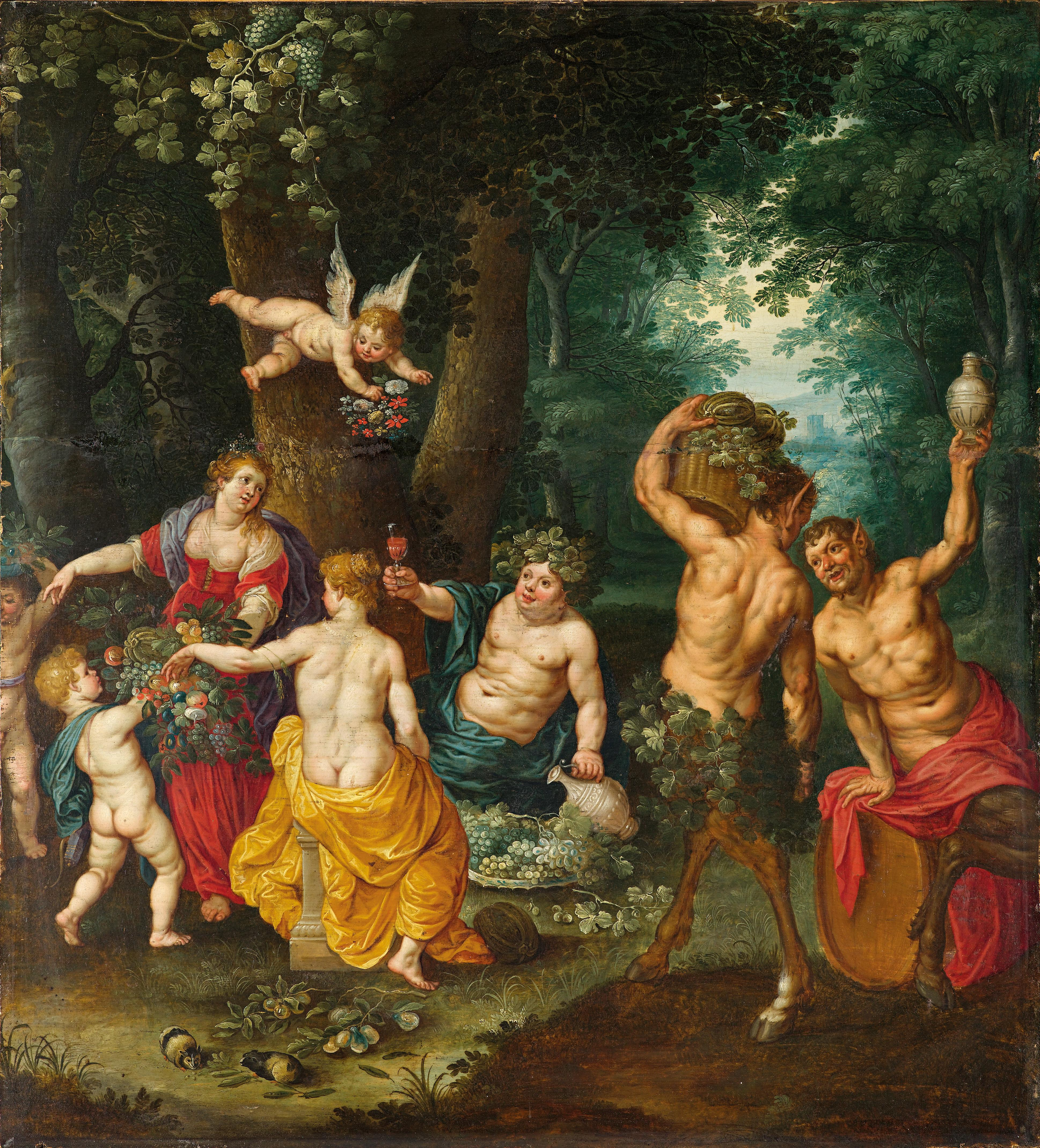
The Feast of Bacchus, with Jan Brueghel the Younger.

Jan van Balen left on 8 September 1639 with his brother Gaspard on a trip to Italy. The two brothers worked in Rome where Gaspard died on 7 March 1641. Jan then returned to Antwerp where he married Joanna van Weerden on 31 May 1642. Not long after giving birth to their only child Peeter, his wife died on 6 April 1643.

Jan van Balen died in Antwerp in 1654. He was buried in the St. James' Church, Antwerp.

== Work ==
=== General ===
Like his father Hendrick, Jan van Balen painted mythological and religious scenes in the style of his father. He also painted landscapes and genre scenes and the occasional still life.

=== Collaborations ===
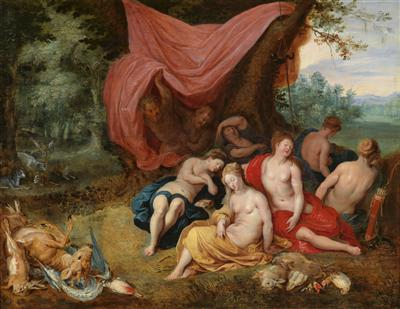
The sleeping goddess Diana and her nymphs, with Jan Brueghel the Younger

As was the custom in Antwerp at the time, Jan van Balen often collaborated with other painters who were specialists in particular genres. In particular, his collaborations with Jan Brueghel the Younger have been documented. Jan Brueghel the Younger was a close collaborator with Rubens and had also worked on compositions with Jan's father Hendrick van Balen. Some of the collaborations between Jan Brueghel the Younger and Jan van Balen appear to have been based on compositions on which Jan Brueghel the Younger or his father Jan Brueghel the Elder and Hendrick van Balen had collaborated before.

Examples are The sleeping goddess Diana and her nymphs after the hunt, observed by satyrs based on an earlier composition of Jan Brueghel the Elder and Hendrick van Balen and The Feast of Bacchus (Auctioned at Dorotheum on 21 October 2014, Vienna, lot 27) based on an earlier composition of Jan Brueghel the Younger and Hendrick van Balen. In these collaborations Jan van Balen painted the figures.

=== Garland paintings ===
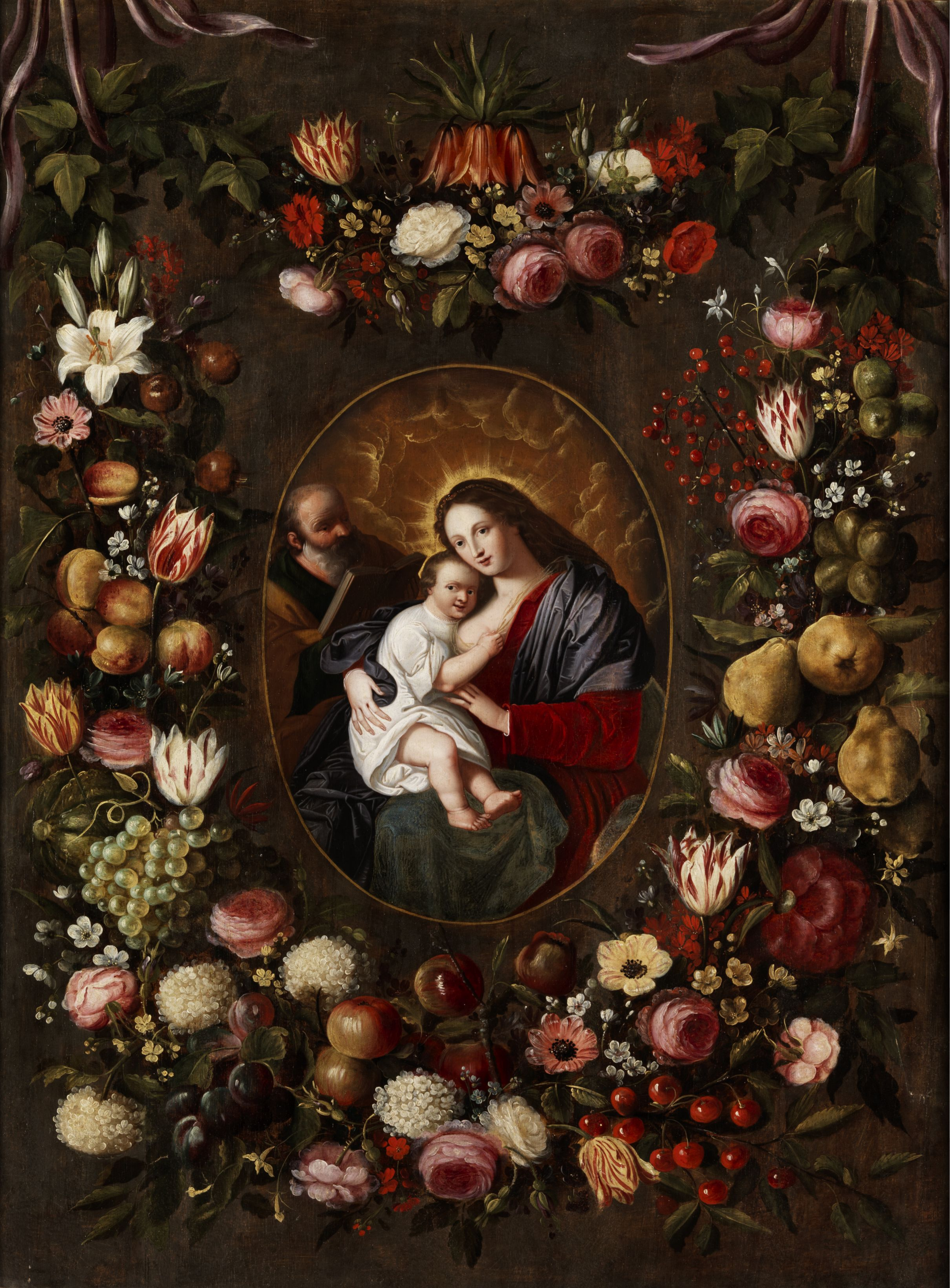
Flower garland with Holy Family, with Jan Brueghel the Younger

A special type of collaborative painting on which Jan van Balen collaborated regularly with Jan Brueghel the Younger are the so-called 'garland paintings'. His father Hendrick van Balen played a role in the development of the genre of garland paintings, which typically show a flower garland around a devotional image or portrait. Together with Jan Brueghel the Elder, Hendrick van Balen had painted the first known garland painting around 1607–1608 for Italian cardinal Federico Borromeo, a passionate art collector and Catholic reformer. Borromeo requested the painting to respond to the destruction of images of the Virgin in the preceding century and it thus combined both his interests in Catholic reform and the arts.

The genre of garland paintings was inspired by the cult of veneration and devotion to Mary prevalent at the Habsburg court (then the rulers over the Spanish Netherlands) and in Antwerp generally. Garland paintings were usually collaborations between a still life and a figure painter. The genre was initially connected to the visual imagery of the Counter-Reformation movement.

Still life with flowers in a berkemeyer, cherries and cherrystones, a Wan-li dish with strawberries and a 'façon de Venise' glass with white wine

Like their fathers, the sons of the inventors of the genre of garland painting also collaborated on similar paintings. An example of a collaborative garland painting of Jan van Balen and Jan Brueghel the Younger is the Flower garland with Holy Family (Hampel Auctions on 26 June 2014 Munich, lot 193). The medallion in the centre depicts the Holy Family while the garland consists of flowers and fruits with a symbolic connection to the devotion to Mary. Van Balen painted the medallion while Brueghel painted the abundant garland.

== Still life painting ==
A signed still life by Van Balen (private collection) is executed in a style remeniscent of that of the Flemish painter Jeremias van Winghe.
