= Madonna with Partridges =

1632 painting by Anthony van Dyck

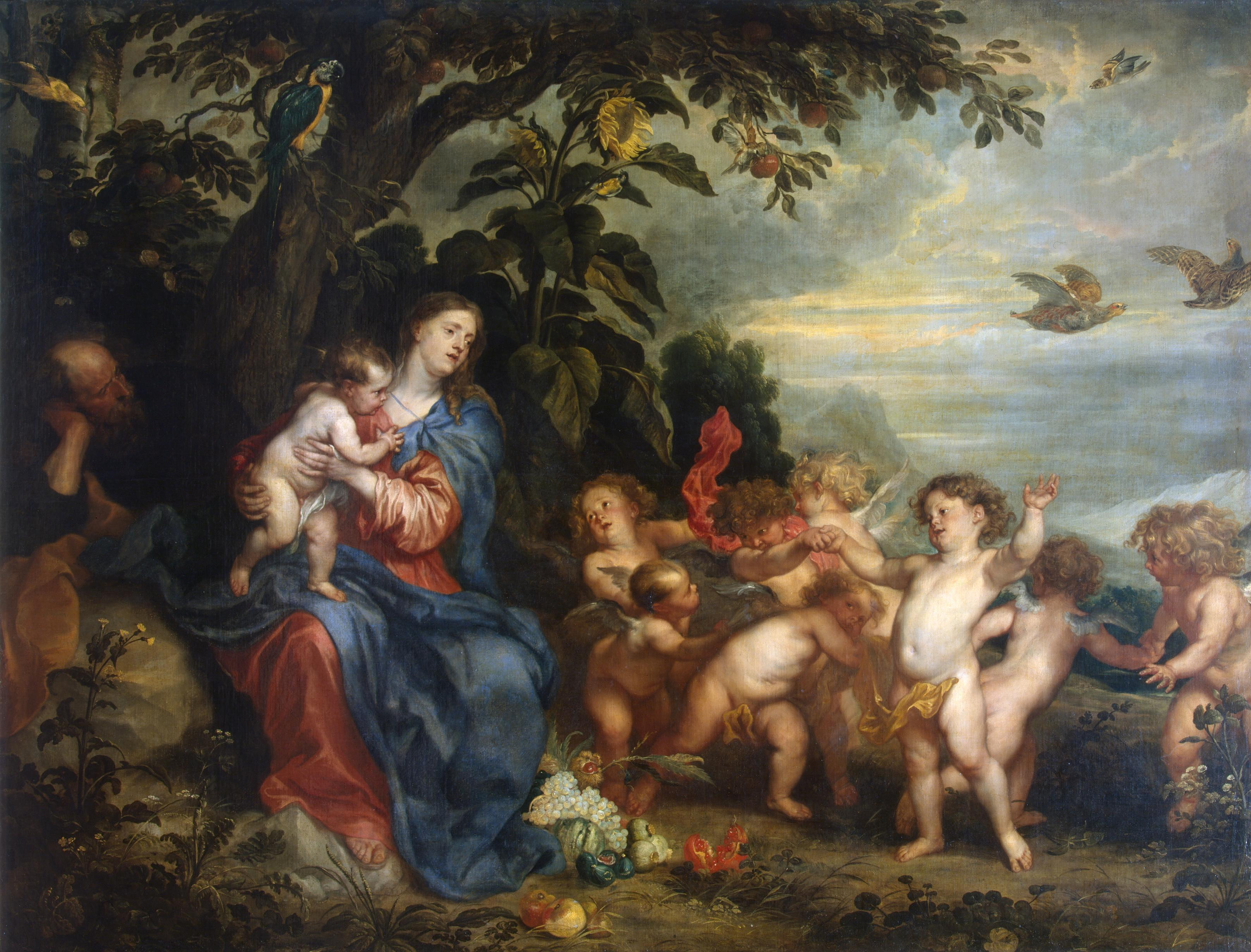
Madonna with Partridges (1632) by Anthony van Dyck

Madonna with Partridges or Rest on the Flight into Egypt is a 1632 oil on canvas painting by Anthony van Dyck, with animals painted by Paul de Vos. It is now in the Hermitage Museum in Saint Petersburg, Russia.

== History, description and analysis ==
As with his 1630 treatment of the same subject, he draws on a medieval legend based on Matthew 2:13 and Pseudo-Matthew 20. It was commissioned by Antwerp's "Sodality of Bachelors" (a fraternity dedicated to the Virgin Mary and led by the Jesuits), with several very specific requests for allegories to appear in the work - the sunflower above Mary and the parrot on a branch to her left both allude to her divine essence as immaculate Virgin, the eponymous partridges (a symbol of debauchery in Cesare Ripa's Iconologia) show her purity putting all sinful things to flight, the pomegranate at her feet is simultaneously a symbol of resurrection, virginity and chastity, the apple tree behind the Holy Family symbolises Mary's part in overcoming original sin and the white roses behind the tree and the lily are an attribute of Mary, symbolising joy, love and beauty.

== Provenance ==
Catherine the Great bought the painting and several other works by van Dyck and other painters from the Walpole collection at Houghton Hall in 1779, making it one of the most notable works by the artist in Russia by the time of Pushkin, who referred to it in describing Eugene Onegin's first impression of Olga Larina's appearance as shared with his friend Lensky: "Olga's features have no life / Exactly like the Vandyk [sic] Madonna. / She is round, red-faced, like this stupid moon / In this stupid sky". However, it has not yet been proven that this work rather than Raphael's Sistine Madonna is linked to Pushkin's poem Madonna ("Not many paintings by old masters").

== See also ==
- List of paintings by Anthony van Dyck
