= Hendrick van Balen the Younger =

Flemish painter

Hendrick van Balen II or Hendrick van Balen the Younger (1623 in Antwerp – 1661 in Antwerp) was a Flemish painter.

== Life ==
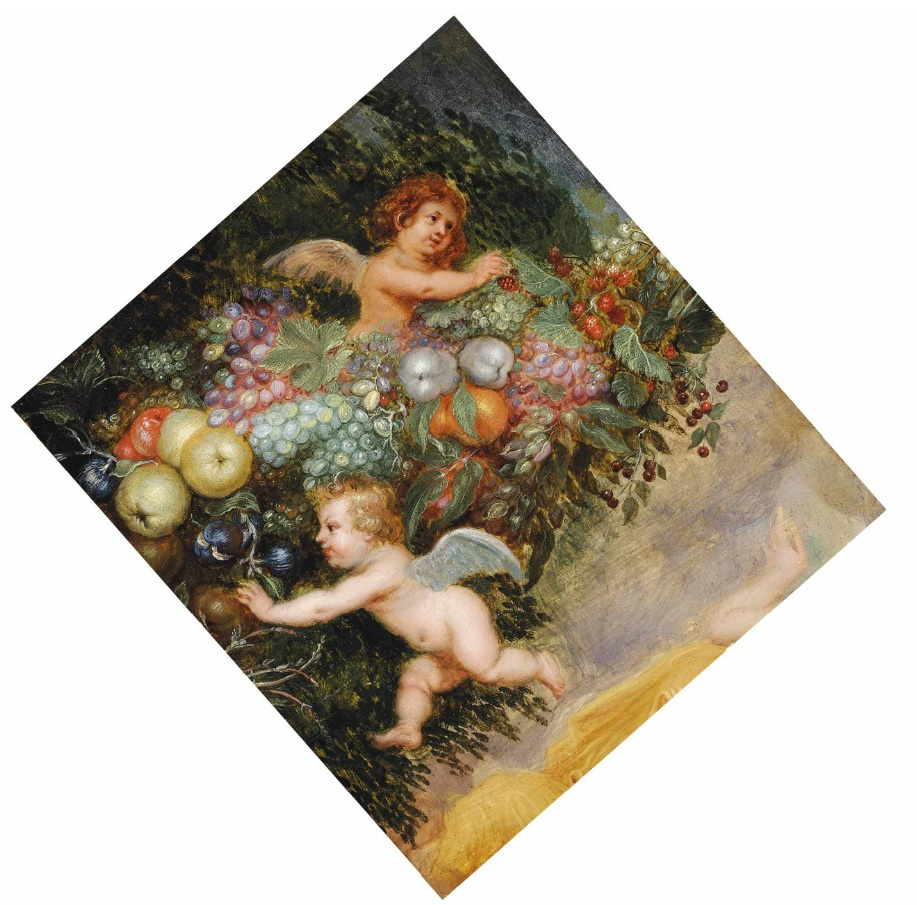
Two putti, attributed to Hendrick van Balen II and studio of Jan Breughel II

Hendrick van Balen was the son of the painter Hendrick van Balen and Margriet Briers (or 'de Brier'). The family included eleven children of whom three became painters: Jan van Balen, Gaspard van Balen and Hendrick. His sister Maria married the painter Theodoor van Thulden. He trained under his brother Jan and the landscape painter Jan Wildens. He became a master in the Antwerp Guild of St. Luke in 1631–1640.

He travelled extensively and resided in Tours from 1645 to 1648, in Rome in January 1653 and in Genua in November 1653. He was recorded in France until 1661 and returned home to Antwerp shortly before his death. He seems to have had difficulty supporting himself from his art and had to rely on financial support from his brother Jan and brother-in-law Theodoor van Thulden for his living expenses while in Italy. He left substantial debts at the time of his death.

== Work ==
Hendrick van Balen the Younger was principally a history painter. Like his father, he collaborated regularly with Jan Brueghel the Younger.
