= Jan Wildens =

Flemish painter

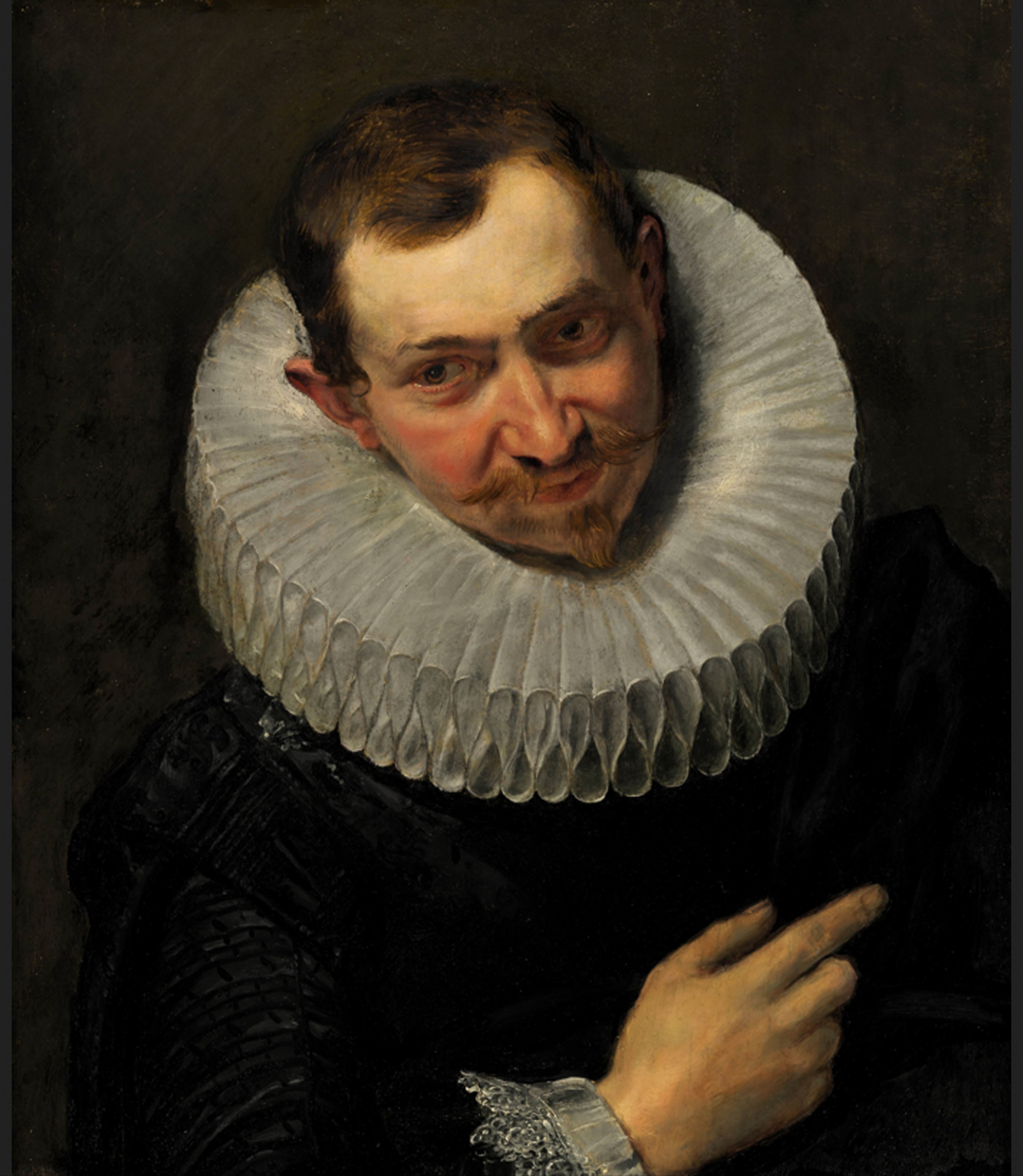
Portrait of Jan Wildens, by Rubens

Jan Wildens (1586 in Antwerp – 16 October 1653 in Antwerp) was a Flemish painter and draughtsman specializing in landscapes. His Realist landscapes show an eye for detail and have a serene character. He was a regular collaborator with Rubens and other leading Flemish Baroque painters of his generation in whose compositions he painted the landscapes.

== Life ==
Jan Wildens was born in Antwerp as the son of Hendrick Wildens and Magdalena van Vosbergen. His father died when he was still young. His mother remarried to Cornelis Cock, who later became the father in law of the Antwerp portrait painter Cornelis de Vos. In 1596 Jan Wildens was registered at the Antwerp Guild of St. Luke as an apprentice of Pieter van der Hulst (I) (also known as 'Peter Verhulst' or 'Floris Verhulst'), (c. 1565 – c. 1628), a minor painter from Mechelen.

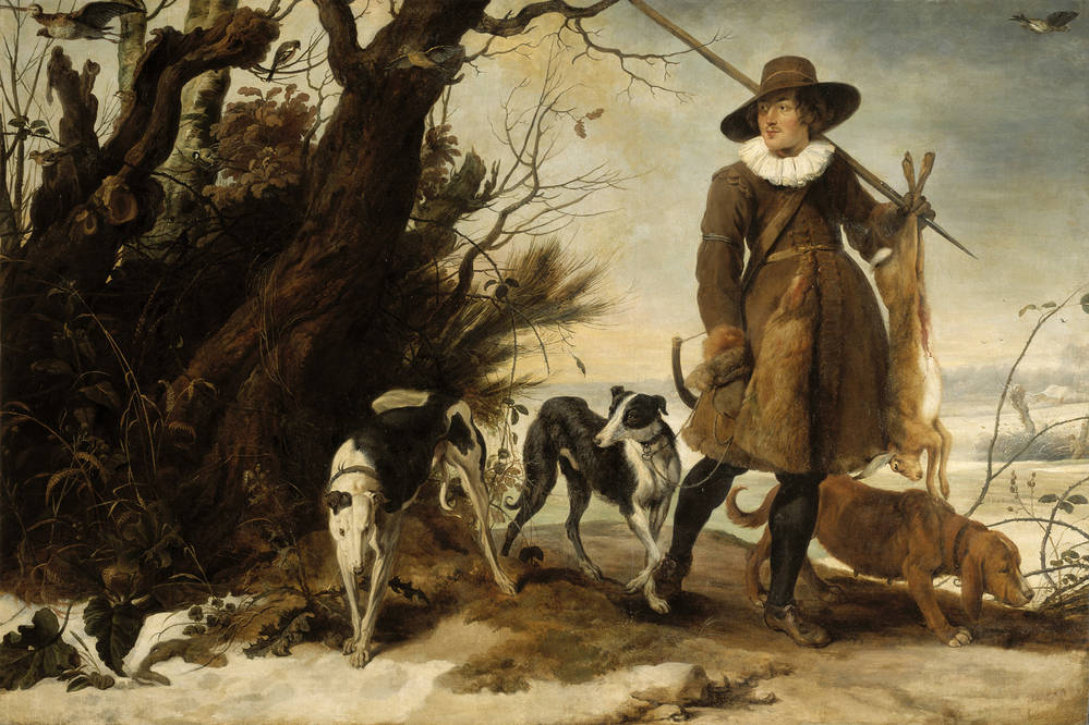
Winter landscape with hunter

Wildens became a master of the Antwerp Guild of St. Luke in 1604. He set up his own workshop and took Abraham Leerse on as an apprentice in 1610. From this period date a series of 12 drawings of the months, which were engraved and published in print form. Wildens travelled in 1613 or 1614 to Italy where he stayed until 1616. Around 1615–1616 he created a series of 12 landscape paintings representing the 12 months of the year, roughly similar to his early drawings. These paintings show his increasing interest in Realism, which was likely a result of his exposure to the landscapes of his compatriot Paul Bril who worked in Rome.

Upon returning to Antwerp, he became a frequent collaborator and a close friend of Peter Paul Rubens. Wildens was responsible for the landscapes in the cartoons by Rubens for his tapestry series on Publius Decius Mus. The two artists continued to collaborate on many works. Wildens also became a frequent collaborator of other leading Antwerp painters. In 1619 Wildens married Maria Stappaert with Rubens acting as a witness at the wedding. Maria's niece Hélène Fourment later became Rubens' second wife. Maria Stappaert died in 1624 after bearing Wildens two sons, both of whom became painters: Jan Baptist (1620–1637) and Jeremias (1621–1653). Both of his sons died young.

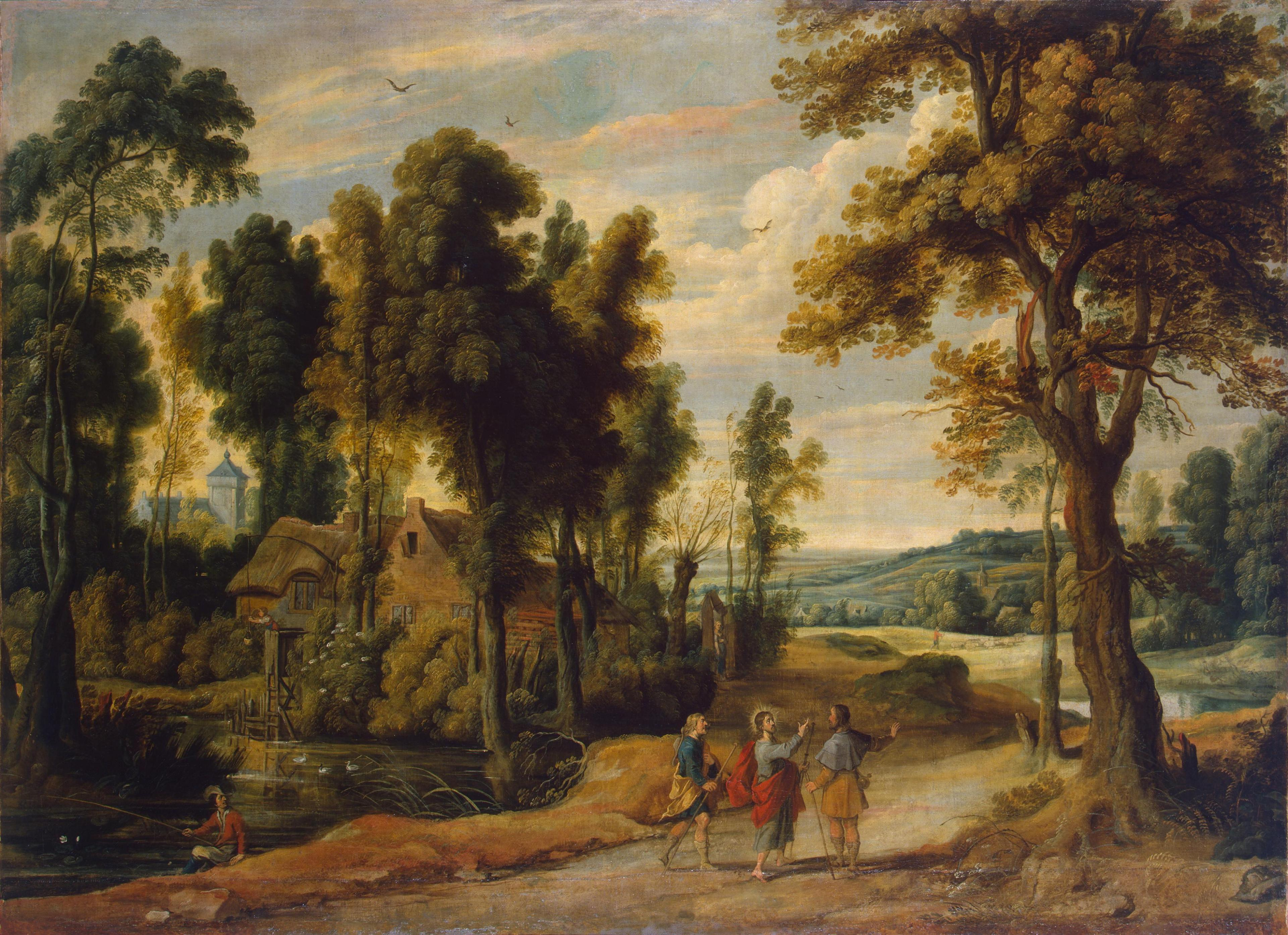
Landscape with Christ and his disciples on the road to Emmaus

Wildens became very prosperous thanks to his professional success. He worked for prominent patrons and participated, like many other Antwerp artists, on the decorations for the Joyous Entry into Antwerp of the new governor of the Habsburg Netherlands Cardinal-Infante Ferdinand. Rubens was in overall charge of this project. Wildens contributed two city views of Antwerp for the occasion.

In the house he inherited from his mother in the Lange Nieuwstraat in Antwerp he opened a picture gallery with over 700 paintings. The gallery was very successful and was later operated by his son Jeremias. When Rubens died in 1640, Jan Wildens acted as a testamentary executor of his estate.

His pupils included his sons Jan Baptist and Jeremias and Hendrick van Balen the Younger.

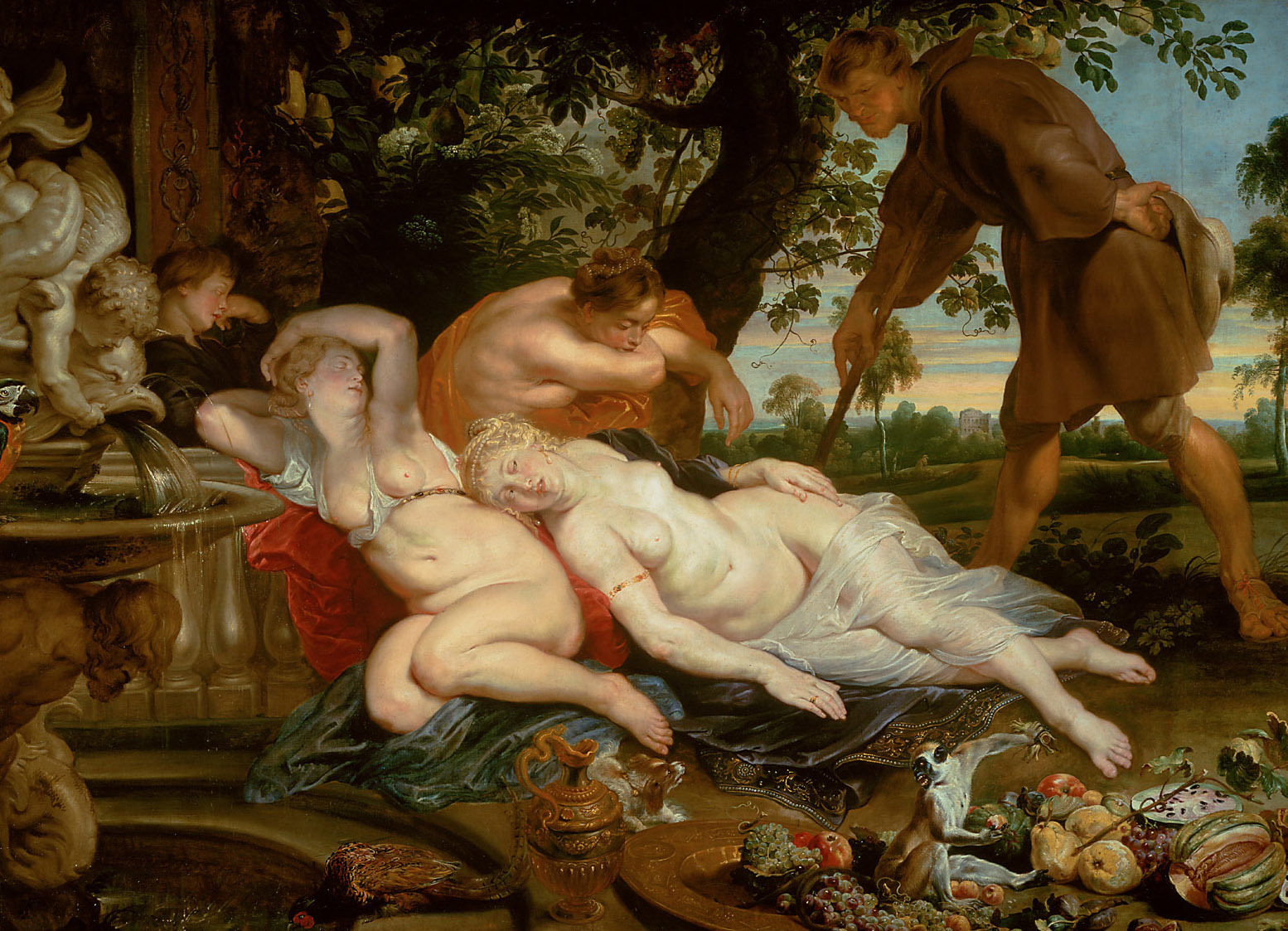
Cimone and Efigenia, with Rubens and Snyders

== Work ==
Jan Wildens was a landscape specialist. The compositions of his early landscapes before his visit to Italy were influenced by Flemish artists such as Jan Brueghel the Younger, Gillis van Coninxloo, Joos de Momper and Adriaan van Stalbemt. In this early period he produced a series of 12 drawings of the months, which were engraved and published by Hendrik Hondius, Jacob Matham and Andries Stock. As was not uncommon at the time the prints sharply contrast agricultural labors and courtly urban diversions.

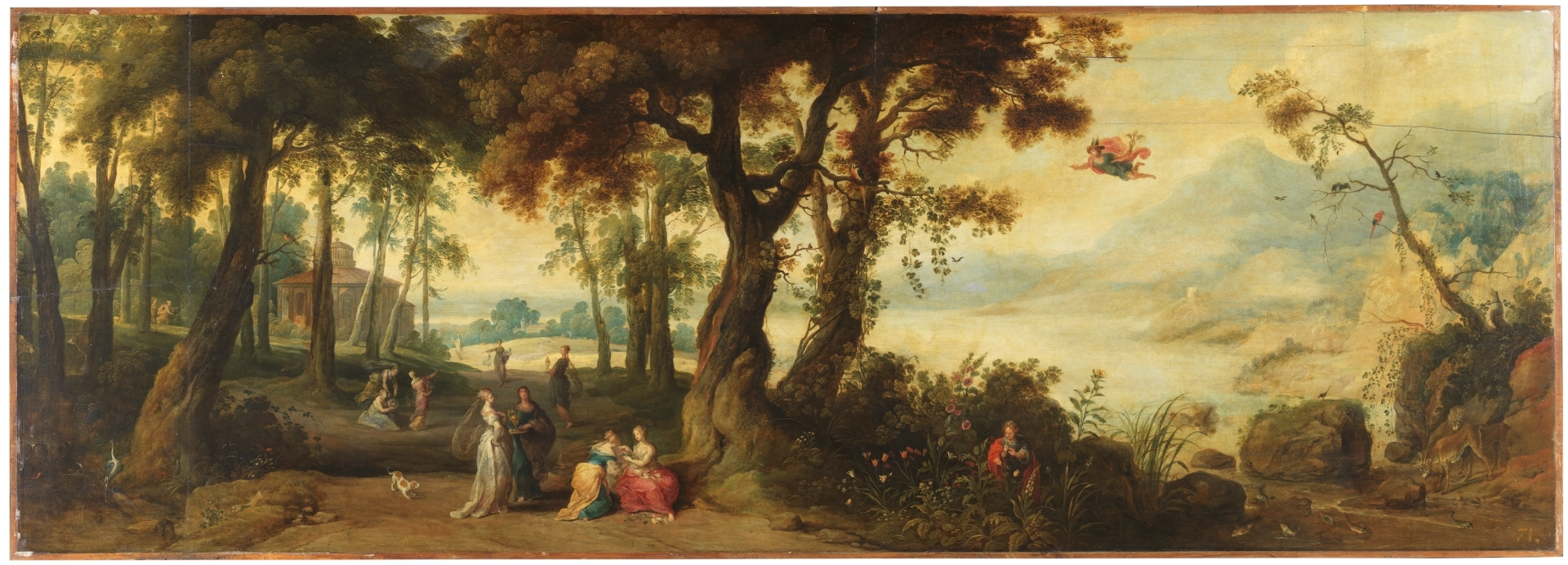
Landscape with Mercury and Herse

In Italy Wildens discovered the landscape art of his compatriot Paul Bril with its realism and eye for detail. Upon his return to Antwerp, Wildens became a frequent collaborator with Rubens. He was responsible for the landscape backgrounds of various scenes in the designs of Rubens for the Decius Mus tapestry series and many history paintings by Rubens, including The Rape of the Daughters of Leucippus (c. 1618; Alte Pinakothek, Munich), Samson and the Lion (c. 1618; Private Collection), Cimon and Iphigenia (c. 1617–18; Kunsthistorisches Museum, Vienna) and Diana and her Nymphs Departing for the Chase (c. 1616; Cleveland Museum of Art).

Later in his career he painted landscapes for many other Antwerp painters such as Jacob Jordaens, Frans Francken the Younger, Frans Snyders, Paul de Vos, Abraham Janssens, Jan Boeckhorst, Gerard Seghers, Theodoor Rombouts and Cornelis Schut.

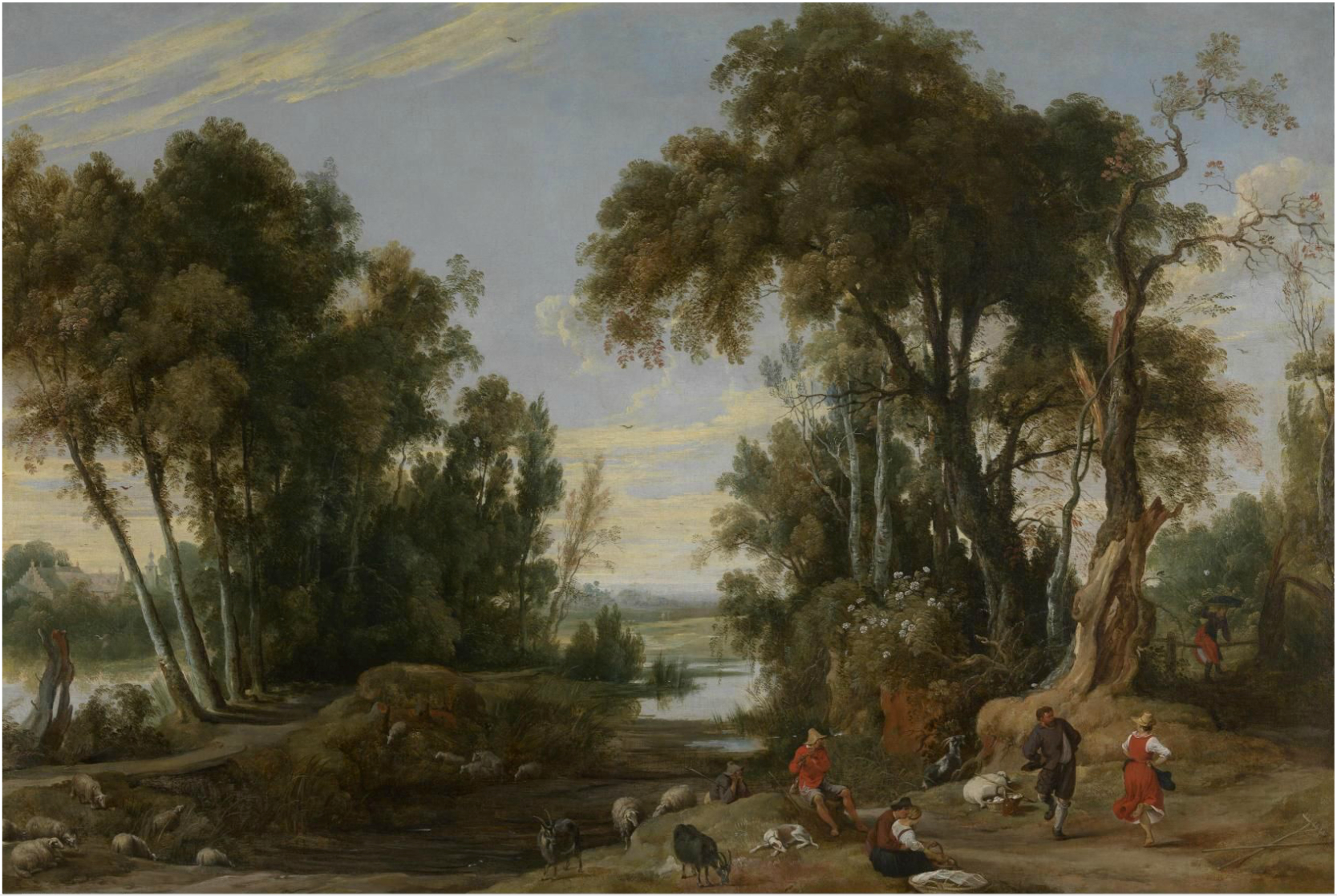
Landscape with dancing shepherds

His work in the 1620s and 1630s employed decorative forms, loose compositions and a broad technique reminiscent of Rubens. Earlier influences on him such as Jan Brueghel the Younger and Paul Bril continued to play a significant role. Wildens' works show a preference for a calm and gentle approach expressed in marked symmetry of composition and soft, subtle colours. The contrast with Rubens is evident in Wildens' serene Landscape with Dancing Shepherds (Royal Museum of Fine Arts Antwerp), which was partly inspired by Rubens' more dynamic Landscape with a Shepherd and his Flock (National Gallery, London).

After 1640 he adopted the rather sketchy method and the vibrating, atmospheric light that Rubens used in his own later landscapes. Wildens also increased the dramatic element in his landscapes from that time.
