= Hendrick van Balen the Elder =

Flemish painter (c. 1574–1632)

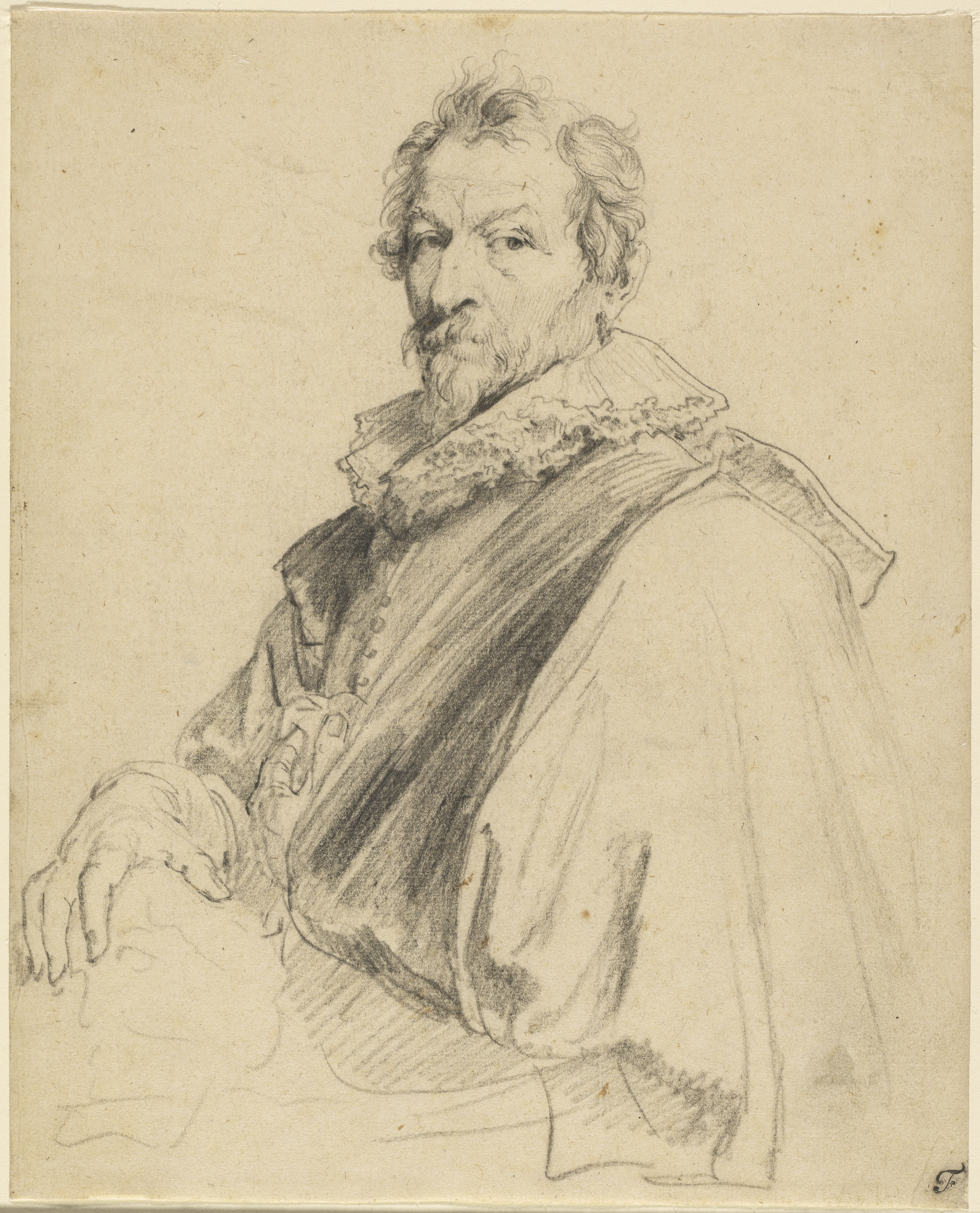
Hendrick van Balen by Anthony van Dyck, c. 1627–1632

Hendrick van Balen or Hendrick van Balen I (c. 1573–1575 – 17 July 1632) was a Flemish Baroque painter and stained glass designer. Hendrick van Balen specialised in small cabinet pictures often painted on a copper support. His favourite themes were mythological and allegorical scenes and, to a lesser extent, religious subjects. The artist played an important role in the renewal of Flemish painting in the early 17th century and was one of the teachers of Anthony van Dyck.

== Life ==
Hendrick van Balen was born in Antwerp. The date of his birth is not known but was likely 1573 as the birth records of the St George Church of Antwerp for that year are missing. His parents were the merchant Willem van Balen and Machteld van Alten. His family was well-off and thus able to let Hendrick have a good training which included the study of a number of languages.

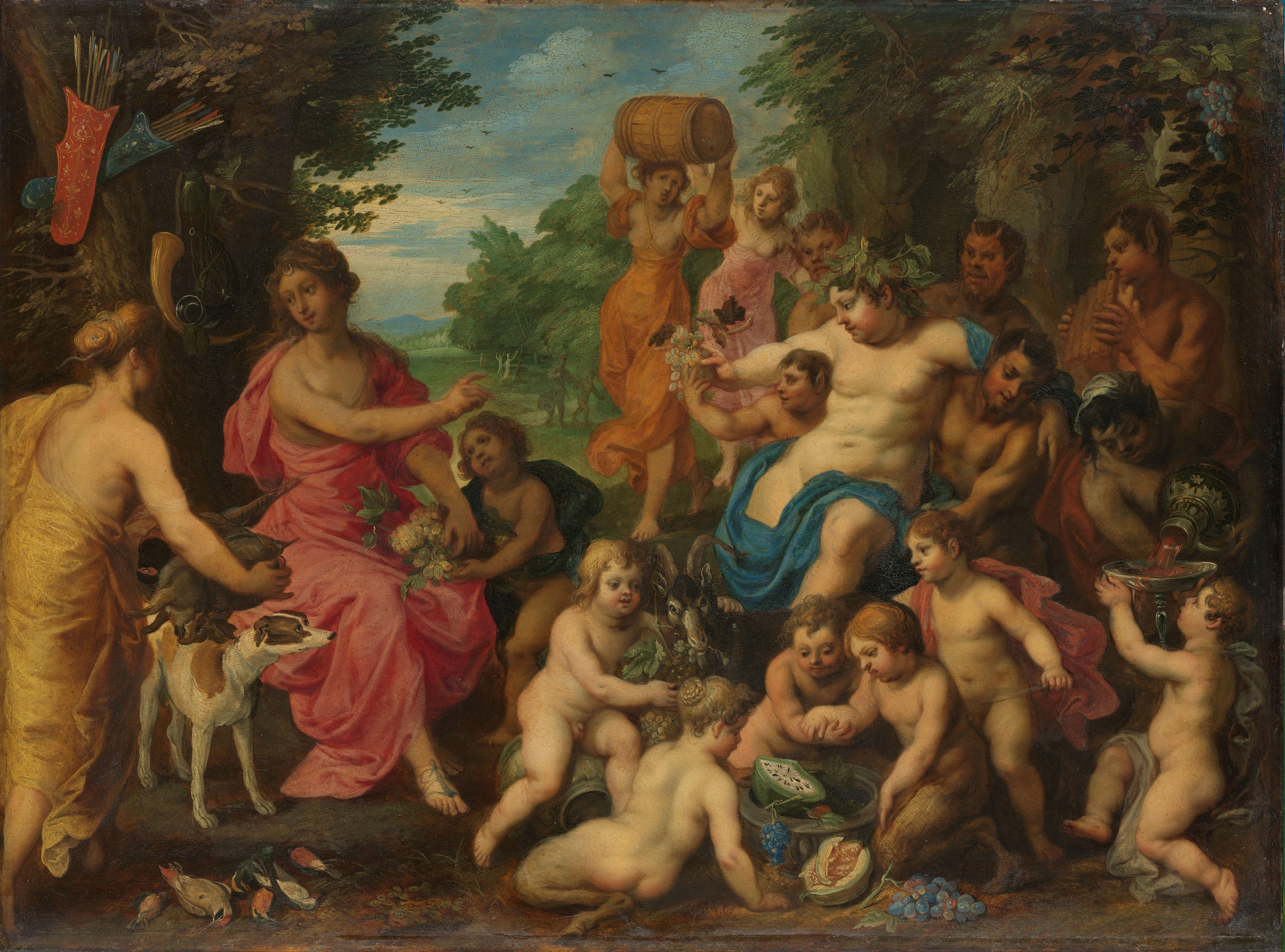
Bacchus and Diana

Van Balen was a pupil of Adam van Noort and possibly also of Maerten de Vos. He became a member of the Antwerp Guild of Saint Luke in 1592–1593 at the age of 17. In 1608–1609 he was the second dean of the Guild and in 1609–1610 he was the first dean.

From about 1595 to 1602 he studied art while traveling in Italy. Although there is no record of his Italian journey, on his return to Antwerp, he became a member of the Guild of Romanists. It was a condition of membership that the member had visited Rome. In the year 1613 the Guild chose him as its dean.

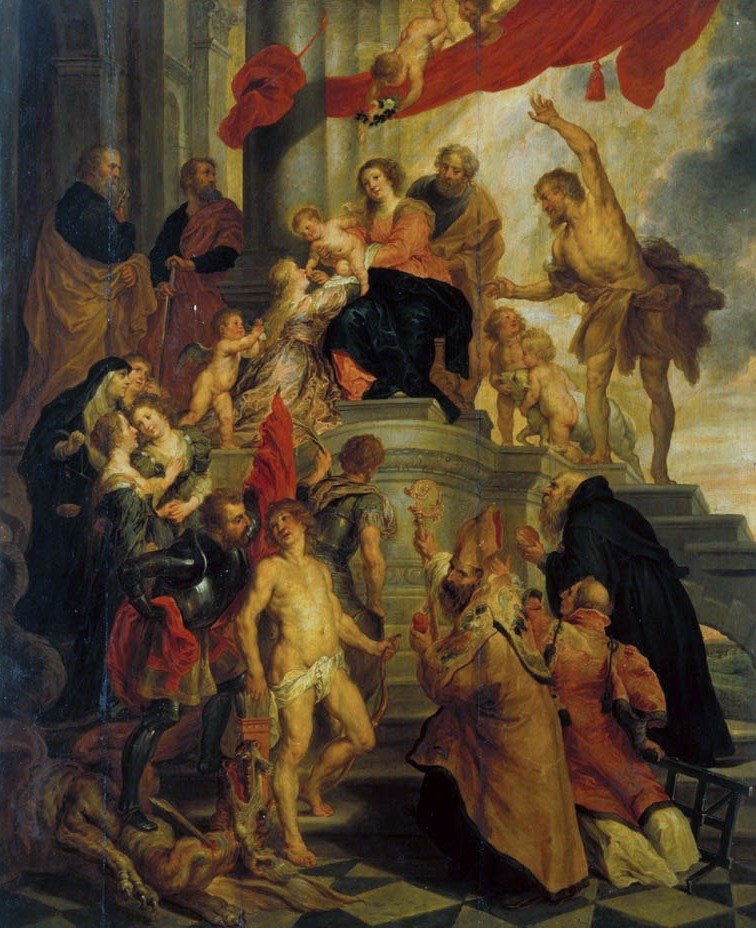
The mystical marriage of St Catharine

In 1605 Hendrick van Balen married Margriet Briers (or 'de Brier') in Antwerp. The couple had 11 children and three of their sons became painters: Jan van Balen, Gaspard van Balen and Hendrick van Balen the Younger. His daughter Maria married the painter Theodoor van Thulden. In 1613 he accompanied Rubens and Jan on a diplomatic mission to the Dutch Republic. Here they met Hendrick Goltzius and other Haarlem artists.

Van Balen led for over 30 years a successful workshop and had many pupils. He was the teacher of his son Jan van Balen as well as of leading Flemish painters Anthony van Dyck and Frans Snyders. He was a contemporary of some of the best-known Flemish artists, such as Rubens and Jan Brueghel the Elder.

== Work ==
=== General ===
Hendrick van Balen specialised in small cabinet pictures often painted on a copper support. His favourite themes were mythological and allegorical scenes and, to a lesser extent, religious subjects. He also created a number of stained glass designs.

While he had a clear preference for the smaller scale in his later career, van Balen's early works consisted of a number of large altarpieces. These show the influence of his teacher Adam van Noort. His later altarpieces, with their rich and subtle palette, appear to have been painted after van Dyck's arrival in his studio. Hendrick van Balen's mythological and biblical scenes were usually painted on small plates or copper plates. His works often included nude figures in a mythological or religious scene, set in an idyllic setting. Van Balen further also painted landscapes.

Van Balen often collaborated with other artists such as Joos de Momper, Abraham Govaerts, Jan Tilens, Gaspar de Witte, Jan Brueghel the Elder and the Younger, and Rubens.

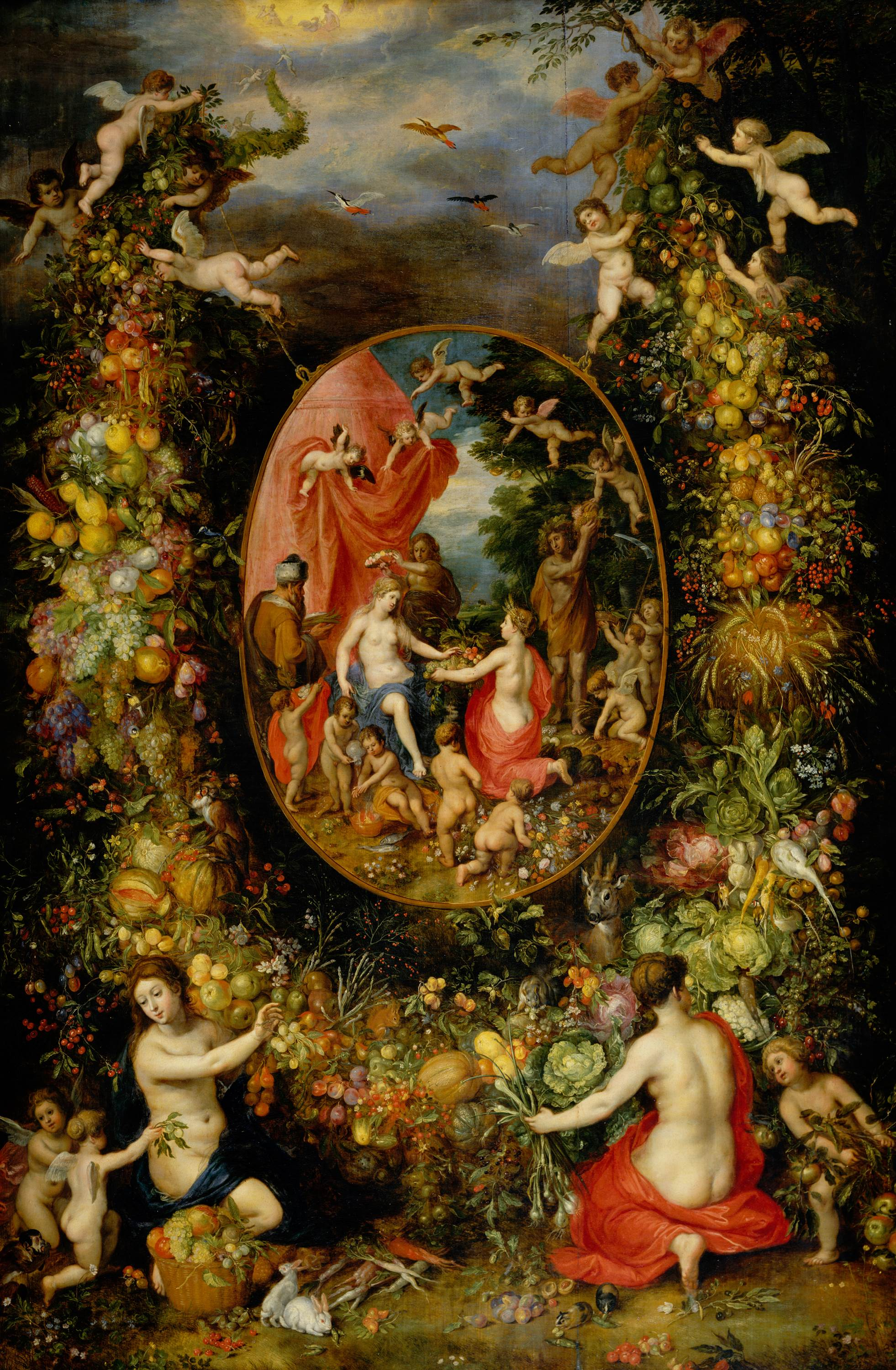
Garland of Fruit surrounding Cybele Receiving Gifts from Personifications of the Four Seasons

Anthony van Dyck made a few portraits of his master: a black chalk drawing (1627 – 1632, J. Paul Getty Museum), which is a study for van Dyck's The Iconography, a series of prints of famous people, and two grisaille oil sketches (c. 1630, Boughton House, Northamptonshire, UK; and 1634–1635, private collection).

=== Garland paintings ===
Hendrick van Balen played a role in the development of the genre of garland paintings, which typically show a flower garland around a devotional image or portrait. Together with Jan Brueghel the Elder, he painted the first known garland painting around 1607–1608 for Italian cardinal Federico Borromeo, a passionate art collector and Catholic reformer. Borromeo requested the painting to respond to the destruction of images of the Virgin in the preceding century and it thus combined both his interests in Catholic reform and the arts. Brueghel, the still life specialist, painted the flower garland, while van Balen painted the image of the Virgin.

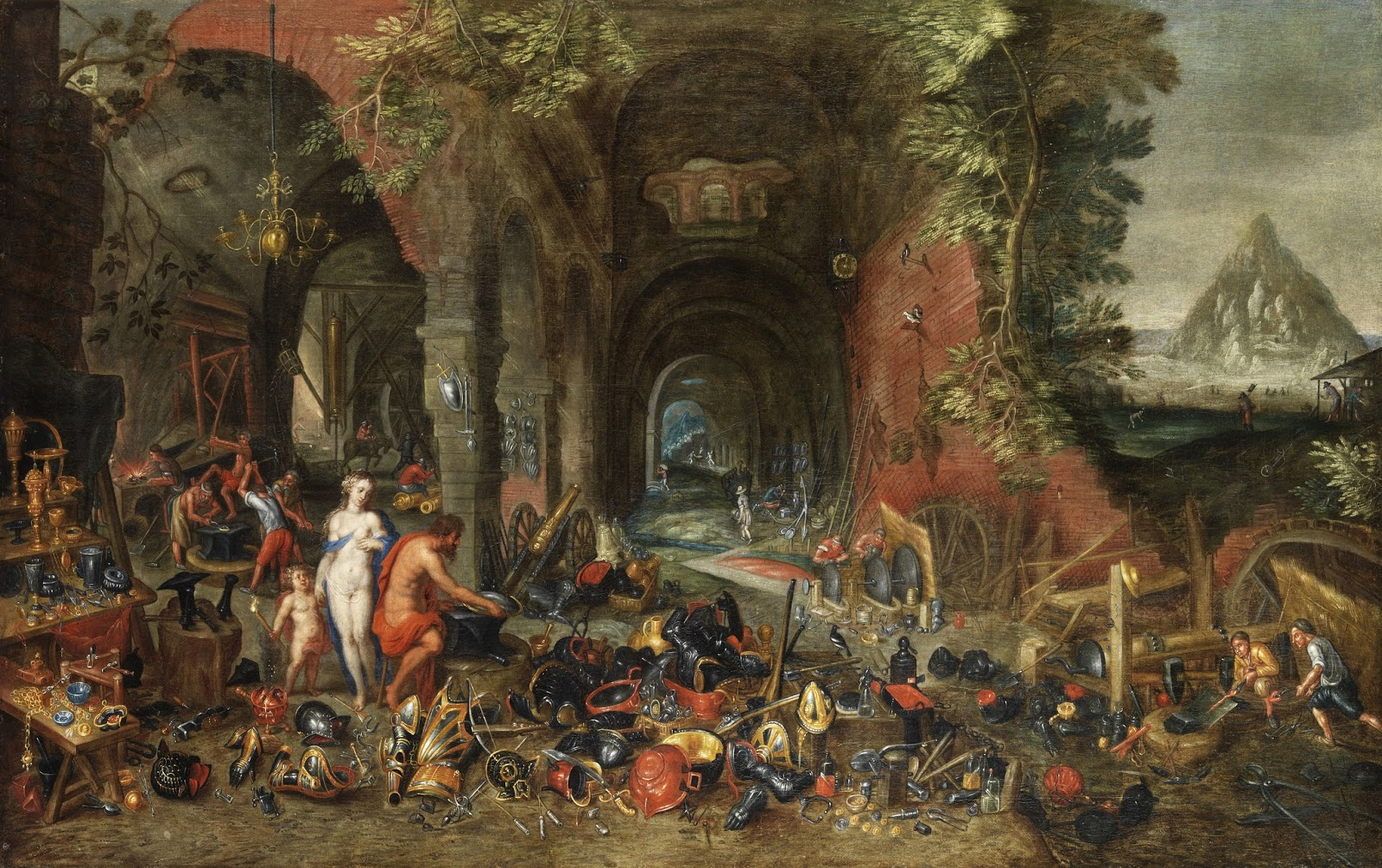
Venus in the Forge of Vulcan, with Jan Brueghel the Elder

The genre of garland paintings was inspired by the cult of veneration and devotion to Mary prevalent at the Habsburg court (then the rulers over the Southern Netherlands) and in Antwerp generally. Garland paintings were usually collaborations between a still life and a figure painter. The genre was initially connected to the visual imagery of the Counter-Reformation movement.

An example of a collaborative garland painting he made with Jan Brueghel the Elder is the Garland of Fruit surrounding Cybele Receiving Gifts from Personifications of the Four Seasons of which there are two versions, one in the Belfius collection and a second in the Mauritshuis in The Hague. Both versions are considered to be autograph paintings, but small differences between the two suggest that the panel in the Belfius collection is the original version. The medallion in the centre is traditionally believed to depict Cybele, the ancient Phrygian goddess of the earth and nature as it was described as such in 1774 when it was catalogued in the collection of William V, Prince of Orange in The Hague. More recently an identification of the goddess with Ceres, the Roman goddess of agriculture, grain crops, fertility and motherly relationships, has been proposed. The reason is that the goddess in the medallion has none of the attributes traditionally connected with Cybele. Around the medallion is suspended a garland of flowers, vegetables and fruit – a tribute to the goddess and an ode to plenty and fertility. Van Balen painted the medallion while Brueghel painted the abundant garland, the surrounding figures and the numerous animals.

Another collaborative effort on a garland painting, this time with still life painter Jacob Foppens van Es, is A garland of flowers and fruit with a central cartouche depicting the Holy Family (Musée des Beaux-Arts d'Orléans) (c. 1620–1630). Hendrick van Balen is believed to have painted the cartouche while Foppens van Es painted the garland of fruit and flowers.
