= Jacques de l'Ange =

Flemish painter and draughtsman

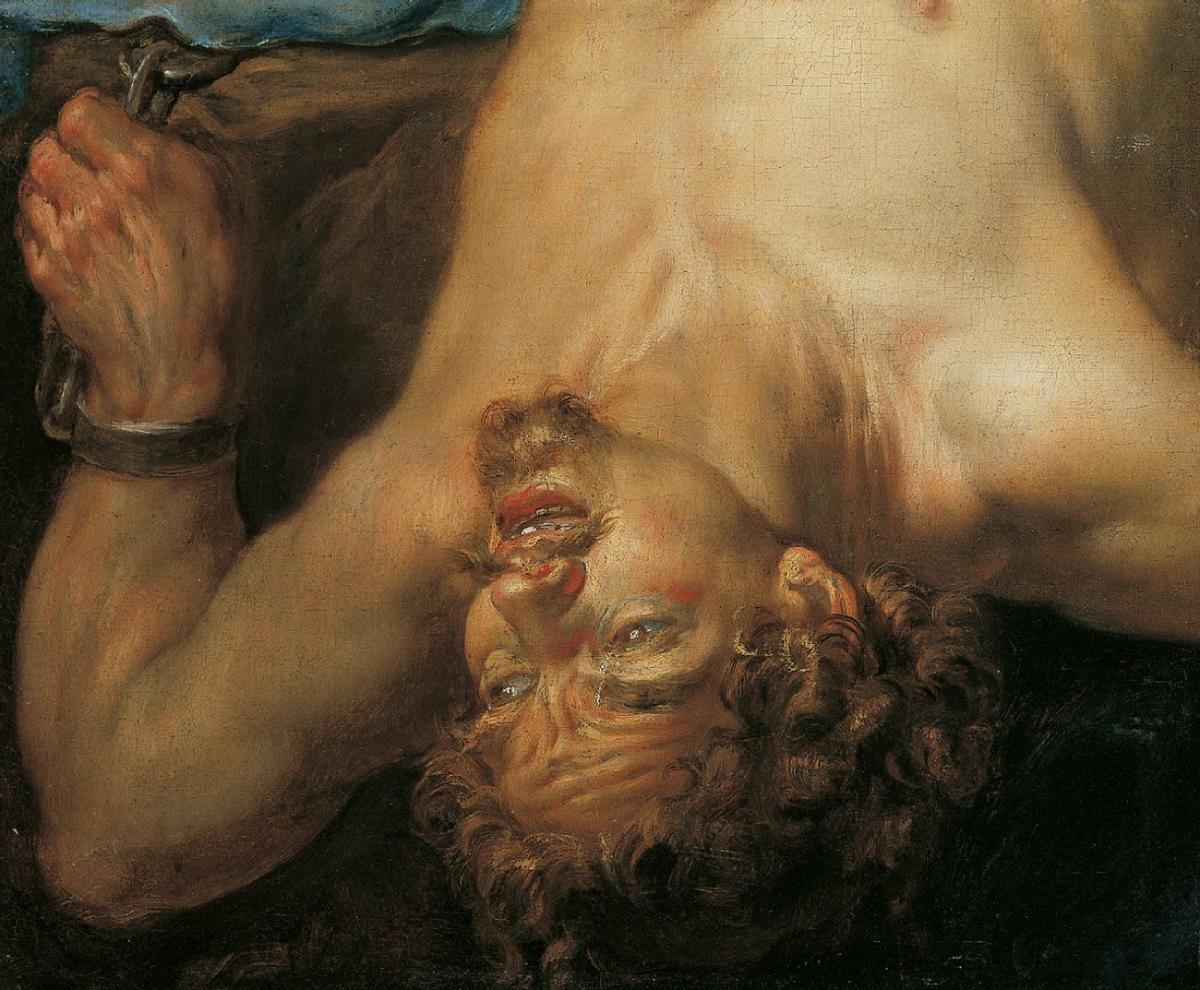
Chained Prometheus

Jacques de l'Ange or the Monogrammist JAD (c. 1621 – 1650) was a Flemish painter and draughtsman known for his genre scenes and history paintings executed in a Caravaggesque style. The artist was only rediscovered in the mid-1990s as his work was previously attributed to other Northern Caravaggists and in particular the Utrecht School Caravaggists or Flemish Carravagists.

== Life ==
Very little is known about the life of Jacques de l'Ange. It is not clear whether he can be identified with the genre and history painter Jacques (Jacob) de Langhe who was recorded in Antwerp in 1632–1633 and was a pupil of Jan Cossiers. It remains unclear whether he Ange could be the "J. de Langhe," who was active as a portraitist in 's-Hertogenbosch from 1644 to 1693. A Jacques de 'Ánge trained under Jan Cossiers and was registered as Cossiers' pupil in the Antwerp Guild of Saint Luke in the Guild year 1632–1633. Assuming he is the same Jacques de l'Ange he was likely born around 1621. He did not register as a master of the Guild later, which indicates that he likely continued to work in his master's workshop following the completion of his apprenticeship. Around 1640 he was able to produce some works in his own name.

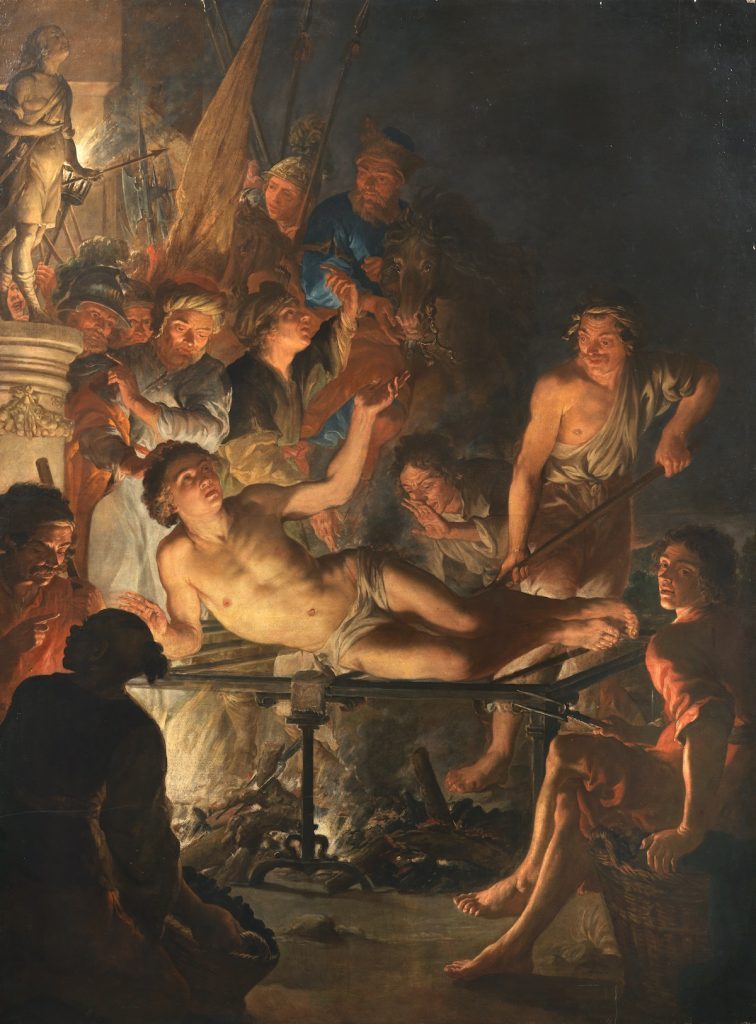
The martyrdom of St Lawrence (detail)

He likely left Antwerp for Italy around 1642, although no direct documentary evidence has been discovered to date as to any places in Italy he may have visited. He may have spent time in Naples some time between 1642 and 1644. Here he could have been exposed to the work of Matthias Stom, who had previously worked in Naples, and temporary Italian artists.

To explain the absence of records on the artist after the mid 1640s, it has been speculated that he may have died around 1644 after spending only a few active years in Italy. Alternatively, he may be identified with the portraitist "J. de Langhe" whose activity in 's-Hertogenbosch is documented between 1648 and 1693. Further research is required to confirm either of these hypotheses.

== Work ==
=== Rediscovery and style ===
Jacques de l'Ange was only rediscovered in 1994 by the scholar Bernhard Schnackenburg when he was able to link the painting of the Holy Family in the Noordbrabants Museum in 's-Hertogenbosch signed with the monogram JAD to a number of other Caravaggesque paintings sharing certain stylistic similarities. Previously Jacques de l'Ange was only known as the 'Monogrammist JAD' because his signed paintings just use these initials and not his full name. Gradually new paintings have been added to his oeuvre based on a better understanding of his artistic personality.

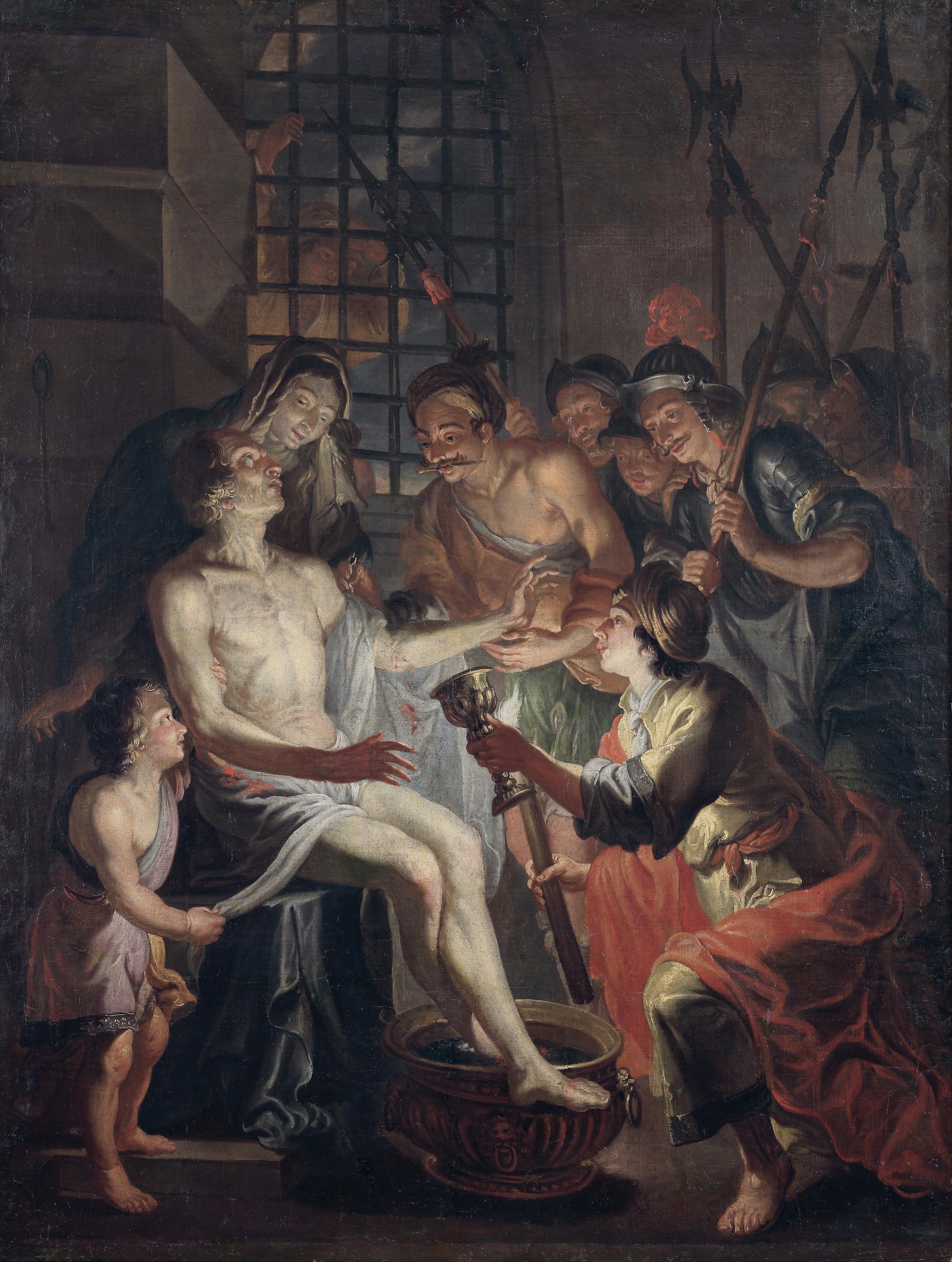
The death of Seneca

Prior to his rediscovery, de l'Ange's compositions had been attributed to other painters principally from the Utrecht School, such as Gerard van Honthorst and Joachim Sandrart. His works also reveal a close relationship with the work of the Netherlandish painter Matthias Stom who is known to have worked in Naples where he produced a number of candle-lit scenes which clearly influenced de l'Ange. De l'Ange also further shows a preference for scenes lit by candles or torches and when he renounces these devices, he achieves a similar light contrast by placing in the foreground figures in the shadow which are set off against the brighter central and background portions of the composition. Works of de l'Ange have further been attributed to artists such as Willem van Herp, Cornelis Schut, Jan van den Hoecke, Gaspar van den Hoecke, Jacob Jordaens, Artus Wolffort, Gerard Seghers, Simon de Vos, Pieter van Lint, Theodoor van Thulden, Rubens and his circle, and later artists such as Victor Honoré Janssens and Pieter-Jozef Verhaghen. The confusion with these other painters was likely caused by the fact that like most of them Jacques de l'Ange painted in a style influenced by Caravaggio. De l'Ange's master Jan Cossiers also started out as a follower of Caravaggio whose work Cossiers may have studied during a stay in Rome.

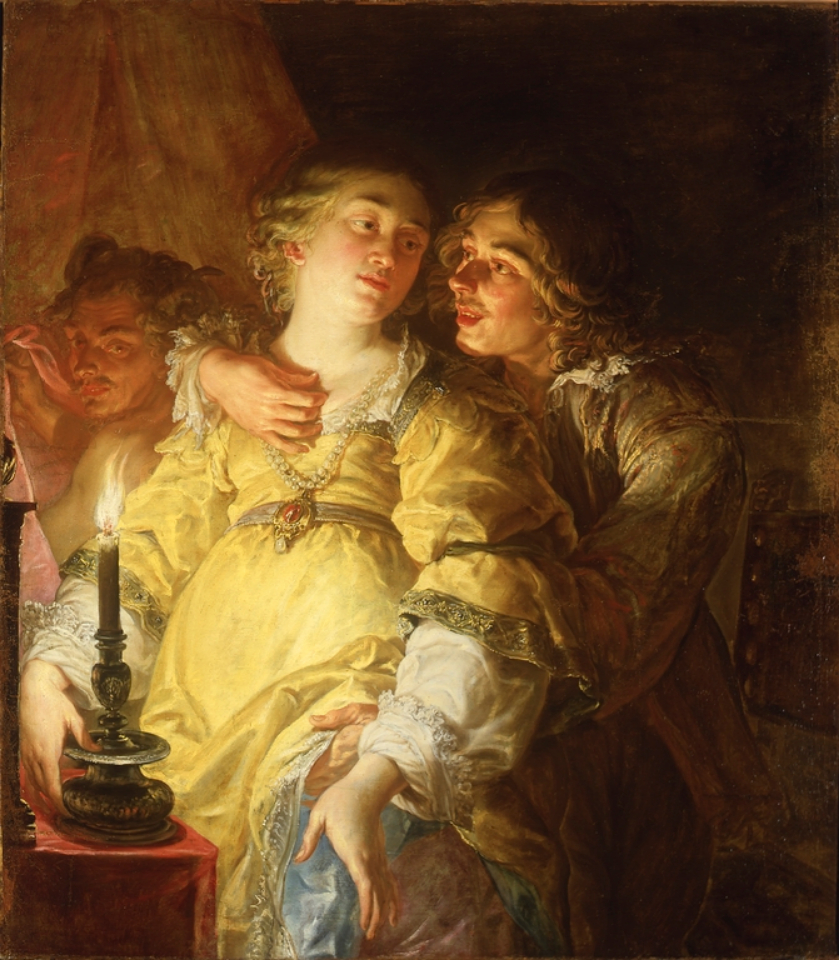
The Lovers, an Allegory of Lust

Other characteristics of his style are his facial types, bright palette and loose and bright brush technique. He maintains throughout his career a personal palette with a preference for tonalities of yellow, pink, orange and red, even while increasingly using chiaroscuro. His female beauties correspond to the Classical type while the Virgin Mary is depicted as a blonde woman, with fine features and large eyes gazing downward. Particular to the artist's rendition of eyes is their almond shape, slanted eyelids and underlined upper eyelashes. Children and cherubs are usually depicted as chubby boys with big heads, thick blonde curls, bulging eyes and rounded little noses, which is similar to Rubens' treatment. He also had a particular interest in turbans and metal objects, which appear in many of his paintings. His style and subject matter are clearly influenced by the Antwerp school, and in particular Rubens, van Dyck and Jordaens along with Adriaen Brouwer. Brouwer's designs for a series of The Seven Deadly Sins engraved by Lucas Vorsterman the Elder was of importance for his own series on this subject. He interprets these influences in a personal manner. His style was likely further formed in Italy through the influence of Matthias Stom and Italian Caravaggisti of the mid 17th century.

The quality of his output is of an uneven level. Grand works of obvious merit alternate with more commercial works. He also often painted multiple versions of a single composition, with the repetitions of a lower level of execution. He often used copper plates, a support which require less preparation and was more convenient to transport. These practices suggest the artist must have worked for the art market. There is, however, no mention of de l'Ange in the records of important Antwerp art dealers such as Forchondt, Musson and Fourmenois.

=== History painting ===
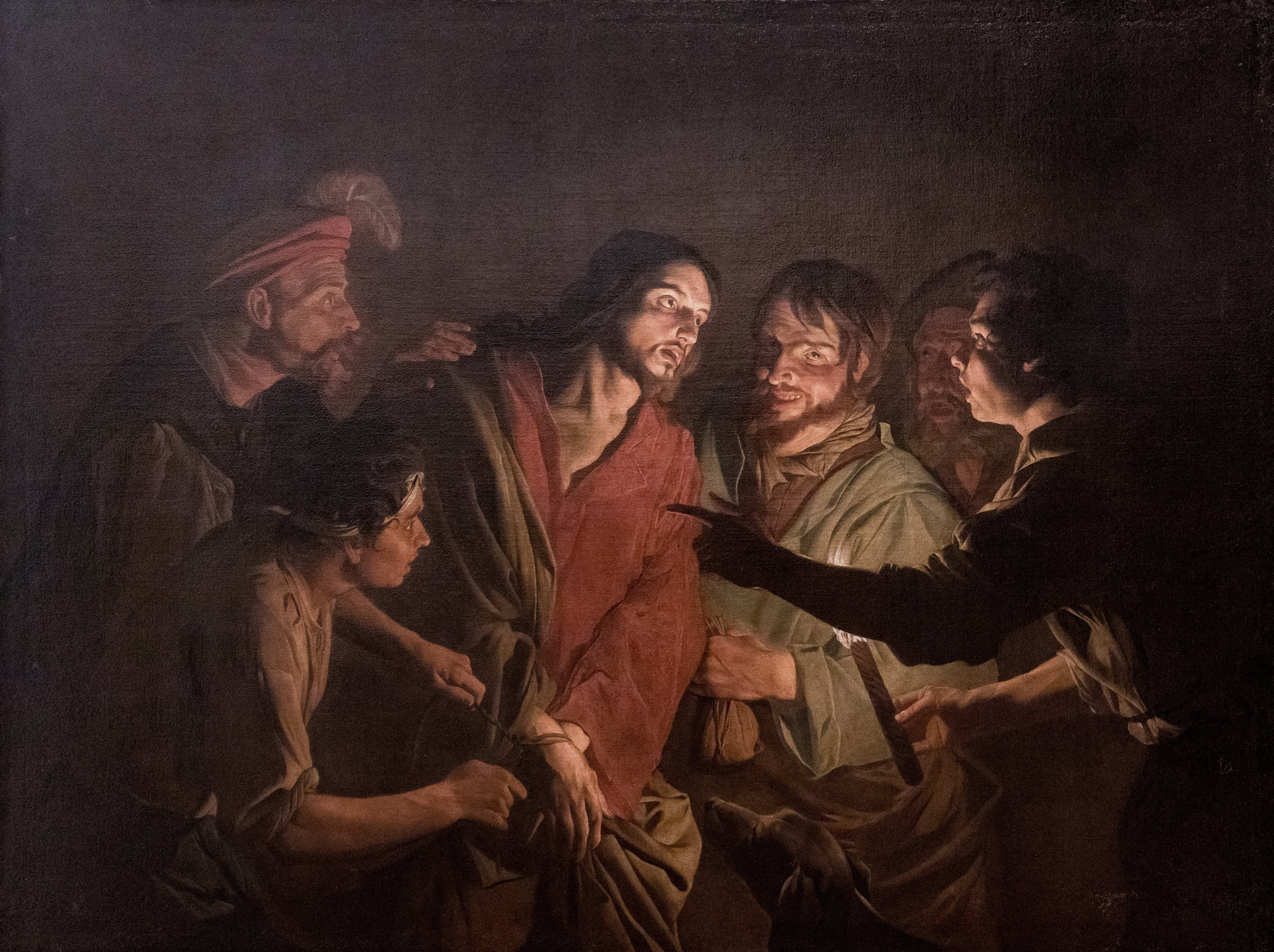
The taking of Christ

The compositions currently ascribed to de l'Ange include religious and mythological subjects as well as historical subjects and allegorical genre scenes. Examples of the former include the Chained Prometheus (Lempertz, 19 May 2007, Cologne, lot 1085) and The Holy Family (Noordbrabants Museum, 's-Hertogenbosch). The latter composition has been ascribed previously to Abraham van Diepenbeeck and Pieter van Lint. His history paintings further include the Martyrdom of St Dymphna and St Gerebernus (Staatsgalerie im neuen Schloss Schleissheim, Oberschleissheim), formerly attributed to Gerard Seghers and two versions of the Death of Seneca (private collections), one of which was formerly attributed to 'Circle of Matthias Stom.

=== Seven deadly sins ===
Jacques de l'Ange is mainly known for his series of seven genre paintings depicting the Seven deadly sins. He executed various copies of the series attesting to the popularity of the subject at the time. They are kept, amongst others, in the Hermitage Museum, the Milwaukee Art Museum, the Museumslandschaft Hessen Kassel and the Musée du Séminaire (Quebec). On its website, the Hermitage still attributes the Allegory of Vanity to Joachim Sandrart. Another painting in the series of deadly sins depicting 'Lust' has been identified in the collection of the Reggio Emilia, Galleria Parmiggiani, where it had been attributed to Joachim Sandrart and Matthias Stom.

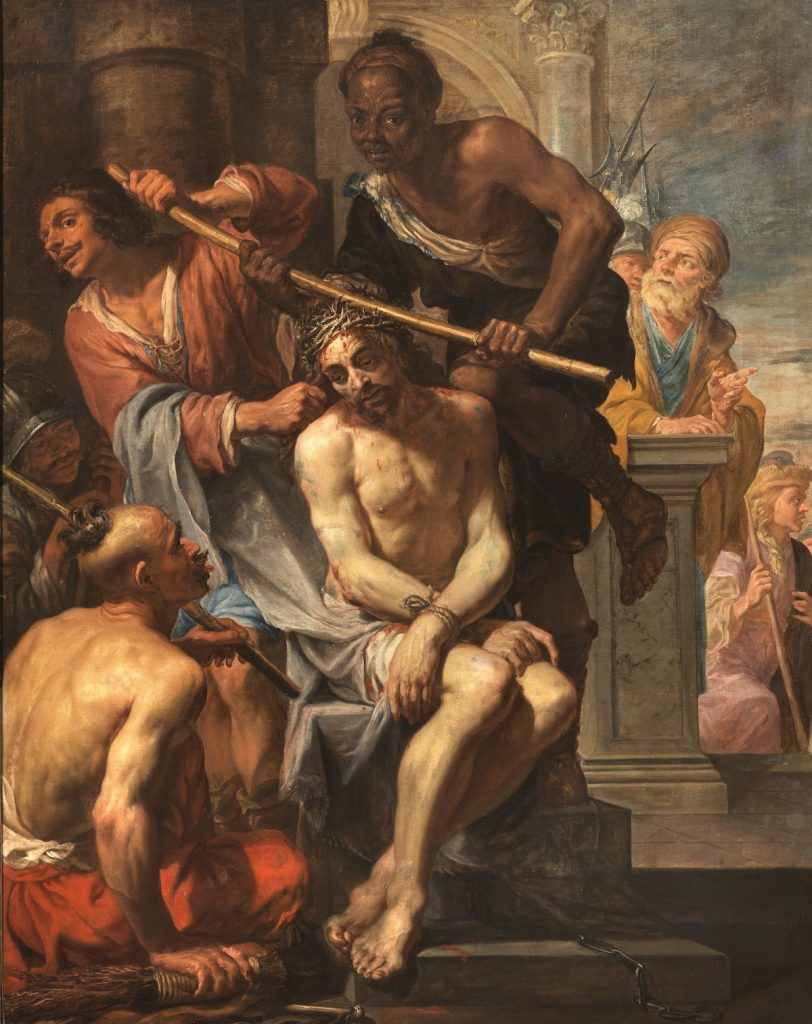
Crowning with thorns

The Ashmolean Museum has a complete set of the seven compositions executed on copper. Some of these are believed to have been painted by Jacques de l'Ange as small-scale ricordi after completion of the series around 1642 and others may be designs for the larger paintings. It is not clear whether all large paintings in the series were completed.

Like other followers of Caravaggio, de l’Ange used light, usually from a single source, to create dramatic effect. For instance in his composition representing Gluttony he placed a candle on the right-hand side of the composition to create dramatic, almost theater-like shadows. As a result, the scene emerges from the dark background and gains depth as the modelling of the figures is accentuated.
