= Adriaen van Utrecht =

Flemish painter (1599–1652)

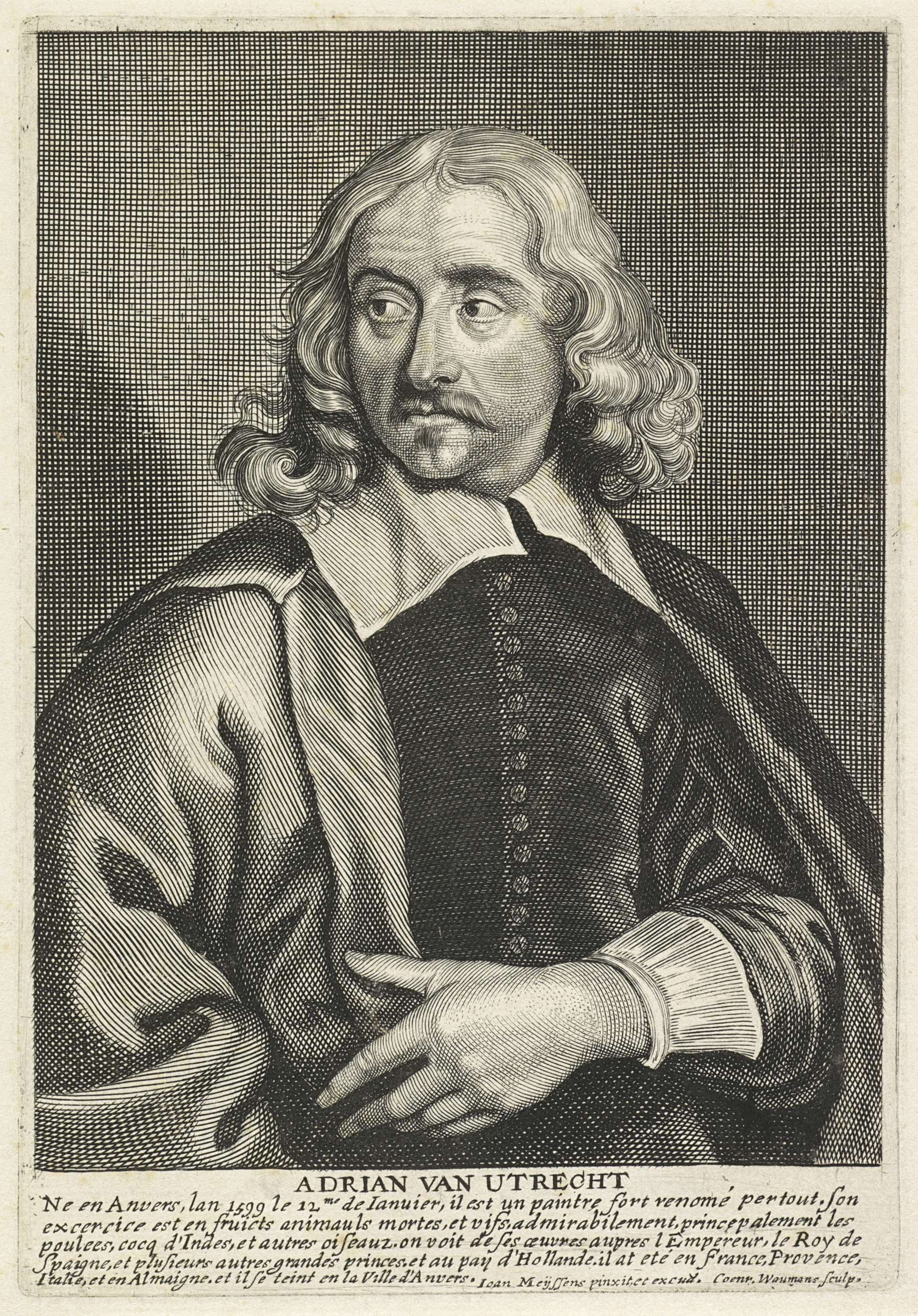
Portrait of Adriaen van Utrecht

Adriaen van Utrecht (Antwerp, 12 January 1599 – 1652) was a Flemish painter known mainly for his sumptuous banquet still lifes, game and fruit still lifes, fruit garlands, market and kitchen scenes and depictions of live poultry in farmyards. His paintings, especially the hunting and game pieces, show the influence of Frans Snyders. The two artists are considered the main inventors of the genre of the pronkstillevens, i.e. still lifes that emphasized abundance by depicting a diversity of objects, fruits, flowers and dead game, often together with living people and animals. Van Utrecht also painted a number of flower still lifes. He was a regular collaborator with leading Antwerp painters who had been pupils or assistants of Peter Paul Rubens, such as Jacob Jordaens, David Teniers the Younger, Erasmus Quellinus II, Gerard Seghers, Theodoor Rombouts, Abraham van Diepenbeeck and Thomas Willeboirts Bosschaert.

== Life ==
Adriaen van Utrecht was born in Antwerp as the son of Abel van Utrecht en Anne Huybrecht. In 1614 he became a pupil of Herman de Neyt, a painter and art dealer who owned an extensive art collection. After completing his apprenticeship with de Neyt, he travelled to France, Germany and Italy, where he worked for the local courts. He returned to Antwerp in 1625 following his father's death in the preceding year and he became a free master of the local Guild of Saint Luke.

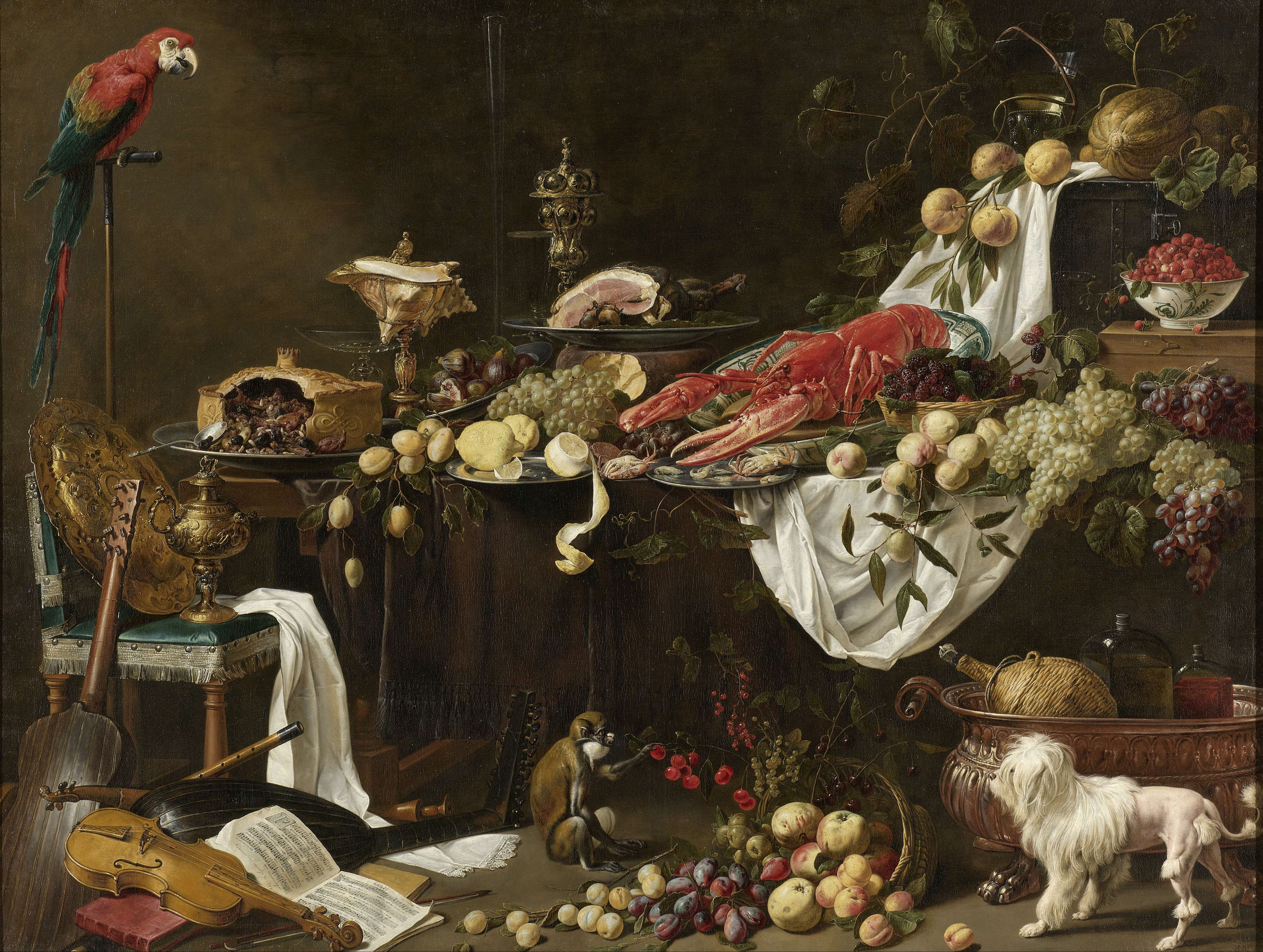
Banquet Still Life, 1644, Rijksmuseum

At the wedding of his sister Catharina and the painter Simon de Vos in 1628, he met Constancia van Nieulandt (or 'van Nieuwlandt'), the 17-year-old daughter of the painter and poet Willem van Nieulandt II. The following year van Utrecht married Constancia. The couple had 13 children. Constantia became a painter and poet in her own right. She is believed to have shared the work in her husband's studio and may have painted partial or entire copies and variations of her husband's work. A still life with fruit fully signed by Constancia van Utrecht and dated 1647 is entirely in the manner of her husband.

Van Utrecht became a successful artist who received international commissions from the Emperor of Germany, king Philip IV of Spain and the Prince of Orange. He could afford to live in spacious dwellings on the Meir in Antwerp, the most prestigious location in the city. His fortune seems to have declined in the late 1640s, possibly due to ill health and by the time he died in Antwerp in 1652 he had lost most of his wealth.

Between 1626 and 1646 he trained at least seven known pupils, including Philip Gyselaer (1634/35), and Cornelis van Engelen.

== Work ==
=== General ===
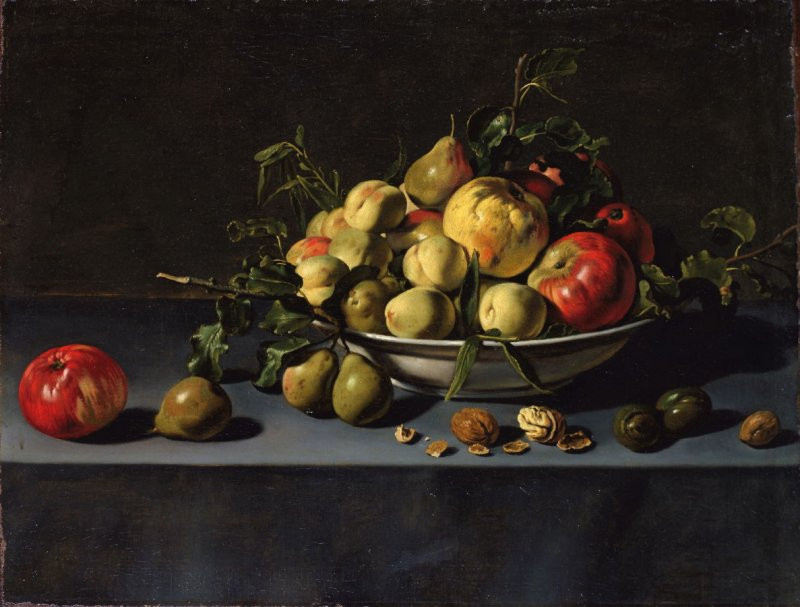
Fruit still life

Van Utrecht was mainly a still life painter. The range of still life subjects that he tackled was wide and included scenes of fish, meat and vegetable stalls, kitchen scenes often including figures or living animals adding a narrative element, displays of game in larders or as hunting trophies, still lifes of fish, fruit and vegetables. More recently, on the basis of a signed and dated Vase of Flowers of 1642, a few still life paintings with bouquets of flowers have been attributed to van Utrecht.

Van Utrecht also painted barnyard scenes with living animals, typically including poultry such as chickens, turkeys, ducks and peacocks.

His early work was influenced by Frans Snyders. Van Utrecht did not favor bright colours the way Snyders did but rather preferred warm earthen tones, especially grey-green, and strong chiaroscuro effects. The latter was likely derived from his knowledge of Italian painting and in particular the works of followers of Caravaggio.

=== Market and kitchen scenes ===
Adriaen van Utrecht created market and kitchen scenes which incorporated large still lifes of game, fish, vegetables and fruit. He thus stood in the tradition of this genre as pioneered in the 16th century by artists in Antwerp such as Pieter Aertsen and Joachim Beuckelaer and as it had been further developed by Frans Snyders in the early 17th century.

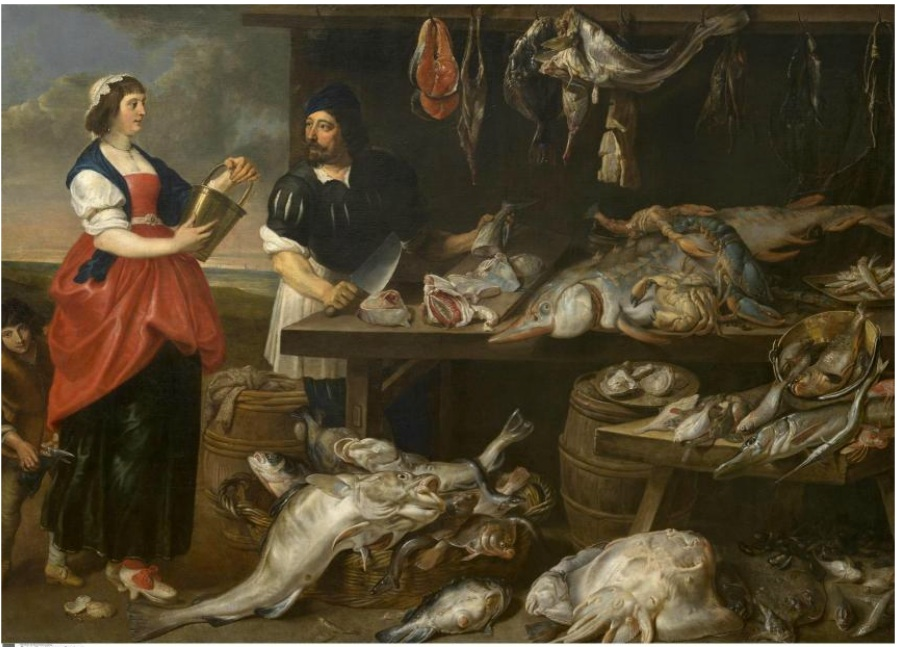
Fishmonger's Stall

For some of his market and kitchen scenes Adriaen van Utrecht took direct inspiration from compositions by Snyders such as in the Fishmonger's Stall (Museum of Fine Arts, Ghent) in which he relied on motifs and compositional elements present in Snyders' Fish market (Kunsthistorisches Museum). As in Snyders' composition, van Utrecht's Fishmonger Stall relies on the human figures and hanging fish to create the vertical component in contrast to the horizontal element of the table. The diagonals are created through the disposition of the fish but van Utrecht is less interested in dynamic movement than Snyders and therefore his diagonal lines are more muted. The figures in van Utrecht's composition were painted by another painter, possibly Gerard Seghers. Whereas the market scenes represented in the 16th century a reflection of a social reality of increased wealth and material abundance, van Utrecht's market scenes are more concerned with the aesthetic effect of the work. Nevertheless, his Fishmonger’s Stall seems to convey a moralistic tale. The garish attire of the woman in the picture seems to imply she was likely a prostitute. The hanging fish and the forms of some fish hint at an erotic undertone. While the woman is negotiating with the fishmonger she is the victim of a robbery by a young boy who is cutting her purse while staring directly out of the picture towards the viewer.

Van Utrecht's kitchen scenes often include a male and female figure typically engaged in some intimate exchange. The paintings with their abundance of produce seem to allude to the excesses of gluttony and lust connected with the senses of taste and touch. An example is the Still Life with Lovers dated 1631 (Bowes Museum) in which a woman shirks away from a young man who is trying to place his hand on her bosom. The pair are standing before a table which is covered with an abundance of baskets of fruit, asparagus, artichokes, cabbages, leeks and poultry. On the left side of the painting a monkey is seen pointing towards the pair from a window. Monkeys were typically symbols of unrestrained lust and the monkey's presence emphasizes the moral message of this kitchen scene. The choice of vegetables and birds reinforces this interpretation.

=== Pronkstillevens ===
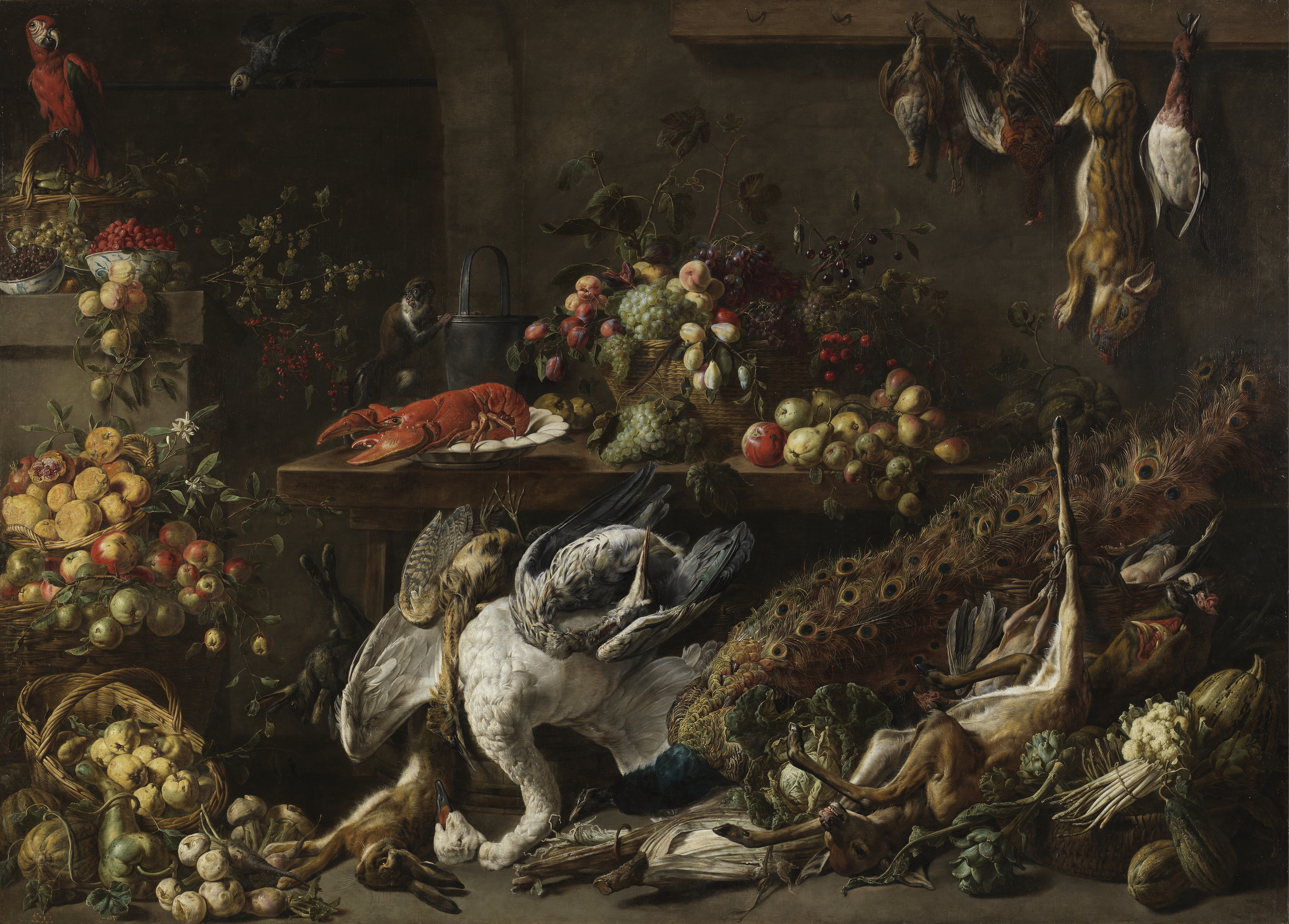
A pantry

The elaborate still lifes produced by Frans Snyders and Adriaen van Utrecht in the 1640s accentuated overwhelming abundance by depicting a diversity of objects, fruits, flowers, and dead game, often in combination with human and animal figures. Adriaen van Utrecht let the objects spill over from the table on which they were displayed to the floor below such as in the composition A pantry (Prado Museum, 1650). He also relied on Baroque devices, such as a sweeping curtain and background window view, to add movement and depth. These sumptuous still lifes initiated the genre of the pronkstillevens, which was also taken up by painters from the Northern Netherlands. A typical example of a pronkstilleven by van Utrecht is the Banquet still life (Rijksmuseum, 1644). In this picture the notion of abundance is emphasized through the depiction of exclusive and expensive imported fruits, an exotic South-American parrot and other items of luxury such as musical instruments and expensive table ware. Given its low vantage point, the large painting (height 185 cm; width 242.5 cm) was likely intended as a chimneypiece.

In the Still life with parrot (also known as the Allegory of fire), dated 1636 (Royal Museums of Fine Arts of Belgium), van Utrecht shows an elaborate display of all the foreign and local luxury items, including Chinese porcelain and a parrot, that were available in the Antwerp market. This offers him the opportunity to display his virtuoso skills at rendering all kinds of materials and textures and the reflection of light on various surfaces. In the background there is scene of a man working at a stove stirring a cauldron and moving the bellows. It is clear that van Utrecht intended the composition to be a eulogy of the creative force of fire, which was involved in the production of many of the items depicted in the still life.

=== Flower pieces ===
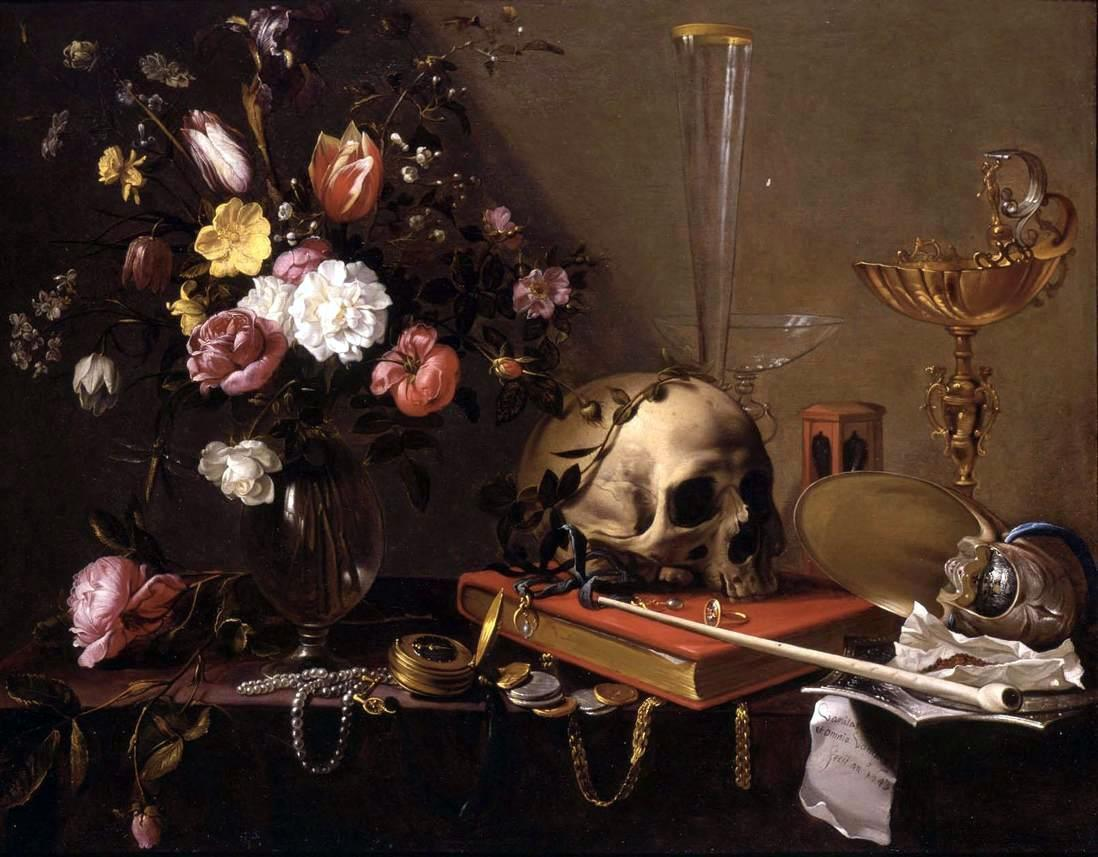
Still life with bouquet and skull

It was not known that van Utrecht painted flower bouquets until the discovery of a piece depicting a vase of flowers which was signed by van Utrecht and dated 1642. Based on this work, several other flower paintings have been attributed to van Utrecht. His flower paintings clearly show the influence of the prominent Antwerp flower painter Daniel Seghers.

The Vanitas Still-Life with a Bouquet and a Skull (Sotheby's, 29 May 2003, private collection) dated to 1643 was identified as a work by van Utrecht based on the similarity of the flower bouquet to the signed painting of the vase of flowers. The subject of vanitas as depicted here was unusual for van Utrecht and shows that his role in the development of new types of still life has not been sufficiently recognized in art-historical literature.

=== Collaborations ===
As was common in Antwerp's art sector at the time, van Utrecht collaborated with other specialist artists, typically figure painters. He is known to have provided the still life elements in paintings by Jacob Jordaens, Erasmus Quellinus II, Jan Cossiers, Thomas Willeboirts Bosschaert. He is believed to have also collaborated with David Teniers the Younger, Theodoor Rombouts, Theodoor van Thulden and Jan van den Hoecke. The collaborative work with Jan Cossiers (dated 1639, private collection) depicts van Utrecht with his wife Constancia in a kitchen amidst an extensive still life with game, lobster, fish and vegetables. It is not always clear who painted the figures in the large market and kitchen scenes and recently it has been suggested that Gerard Seghers painted the figures in the Fishmonger's Stall (Museum of Fine Arts, Ghent).

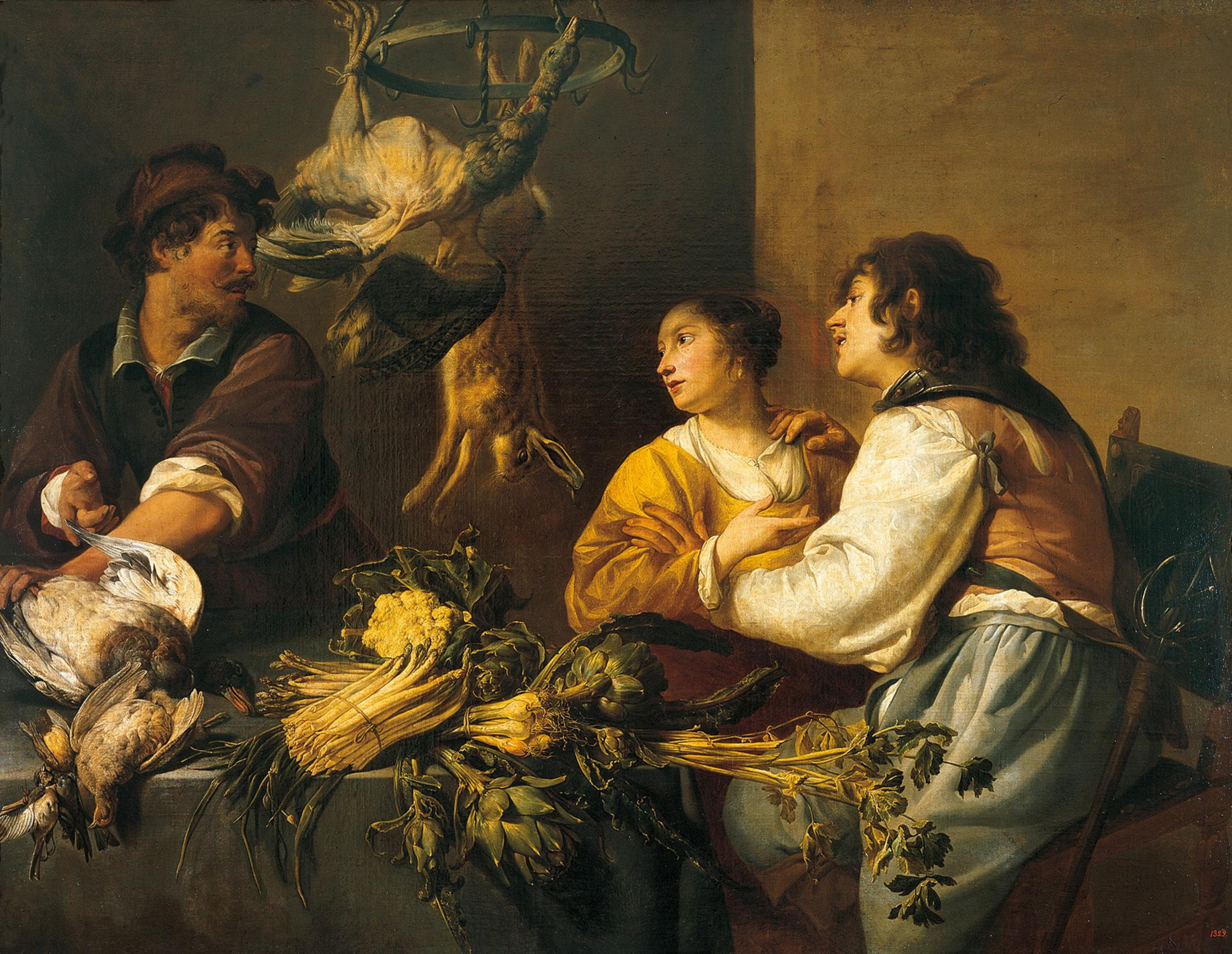
Kitchen, a collaboration with Theodoor Rombouts

The collaborations between artists often created opportunities for patronage. Van Utrecht's regular collaborator Willeboirts Bosschaert relied on his good connections with Constantijn Huygens to secure for van Utrecht commissions for decorations at Huis ten Bosch in The Hague in 1646. Huis ten Bosch was the residence of the Dutch stadtholder Frederik Hendrik of Orange 's widow, Amalia von Solms.

=== Tapestry design ===
Van Utrecht also contributed to tapestry designs. In particular, it is known that he was asked by court painter and designer Jan van den Hoecke to assist with a series of tapestries under the title 'Allegory of Time' (c. 1650) made for Archduke Leopold Wilhelm of Austria. Several other artists such as Pieter Thijs, Jan Brueghel the Younger and Thomas Willeboirts Bosschaert also worked on the series. Ten preparatory oil sketches that van den Hoecke made for the series have survived (four in the Kunsthistorisches Museum, Vienna), as have eight tapestries based on the designs for Day and Night and The Months. Based on the differences between the modelli and the executed tapestries of the tapestries representing the months of January and February, it is believed that Adriaen van Utrecht made improvements to the animals in van den Hoecke's modelli which were then included in the finished works.

=== Influence ===
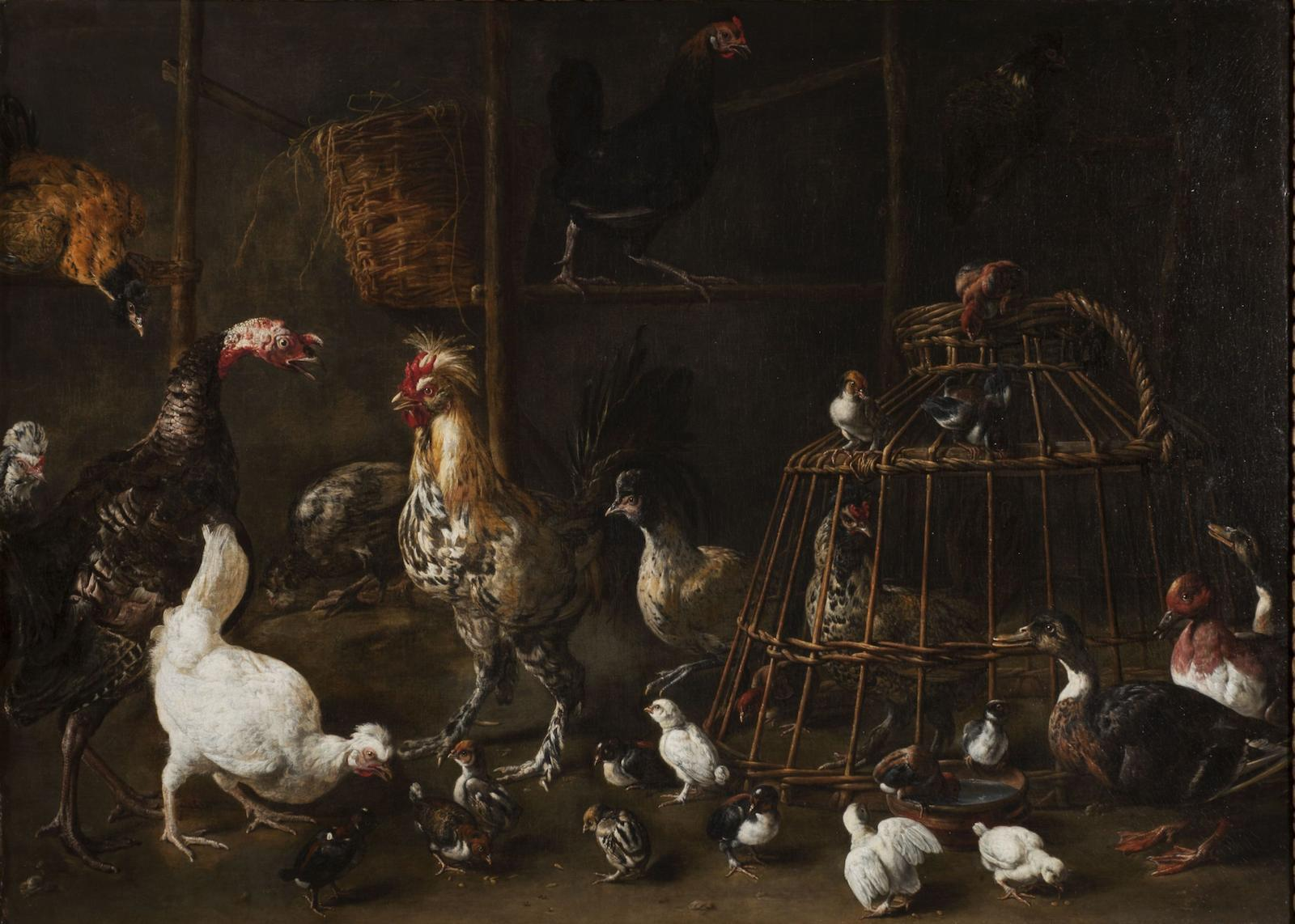
A barn interior with a turkey

Van Utrecht's work influenced Jan Davidsz de Heem, Evaristo Baschenis, and Nicolas de Largillière. Abraham van Beyeren is believed to have been influenced by van Utrecht's pronkstillevens, which he likely saw in the Huis ten Bosch in The Hague for which van Utrecht had contributed decorations in 1646.

== Collections ==
Van Utrecht's work is represented in numerous museum collections, including the Royal Museum of Fine Arts Antwerp, the Rijksmuseum, the Louvre, the Hermitage, the Nationalmuseet Stockholm, the Bowes Museum, the Kunsthistorisches Museum, and in the USA the Getty Museum, Malibu, the Fine Arts Museum, San Francisco, the Utah Fine Arts Museum, the National Gallery Bulgaria. It is also part of public collections in Arras, Belgrade, Brussels, Cambrai, Cologne, Copenhagen, Lithuania, Munich, Tokyo and other cities.
