= Philip Gyselaer =

Flemish painter

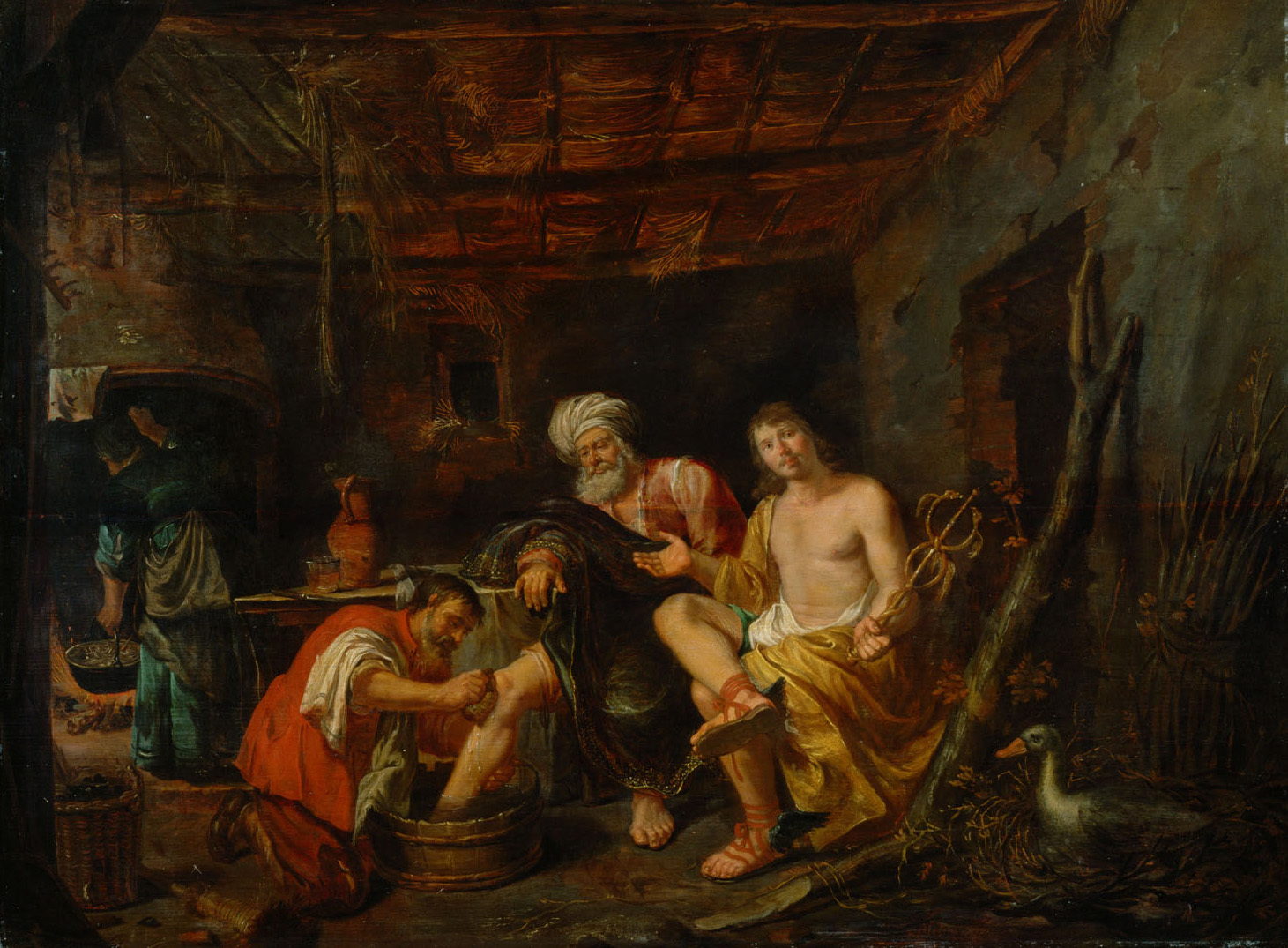
Mercury and Jupiter in the House of Philemon and Baucis

Philip Gyselaer, also Giselaer (c. 1620 – after 1650), was a Flemish painter specialized in history painting in the tradition of Willem van Herp. He was registered at the Antwerp Guild of St. Luke as a pupil of Adriaen van Utrecht in 1634.

Only a few of his works are known. One of his works depicting Mercury and Jupiter in the House of Philemon and Baucis is in the collection of the Kunsthistorisches Museum.

== Sources ==
- J. de Maere, Jennifer A. Martin, and Marie Wabbes. Illustrated Dictionary of 17th Century Flemish Painters. Brussels: Renaissance du livre, 1994; p. 190.
