= Jan Cossiers =

Flemish painter (1600–1671)

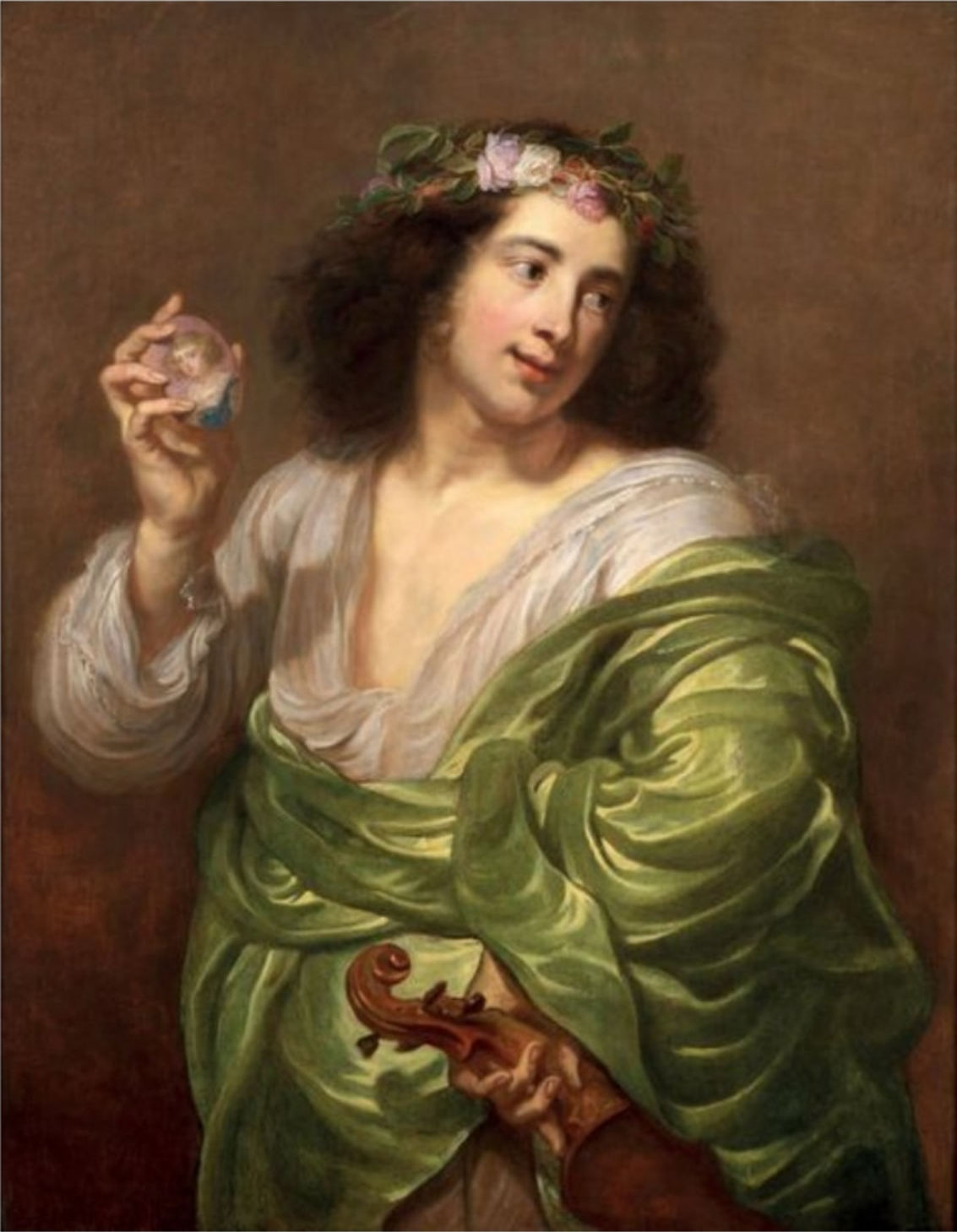
Portrait of a man holding a violin and a medallion with a miniature of a woman

Jan Cossiers (Antwerp, 15 July 1600 – Antwerp, 4 July 1671) was a Flemish painter and draughtsman. Cossiers' earliest works were Caravaggesque genre works depicting low life scenes. Later in his career he painted mostly history and religious subjects as well as portraits. Cossiers was one of the leading painters in Antwerp after Rubens' death in 1640 and one of the most original colorists in 17th-century Flanders. He was an accomplished draughtsman who created some sensitive portrait drawings executed in a very varied and fluid manner.

== Life ==
Jan Cossiers was the son of Antoon, a watercolor painter, and Maria van Cleef. He was baptized in the Antwerp Cathedral on 15 July 1600. He received his first training from his father and then moved to the studio of the prominent portrait and history painter Cornelis de Vos.

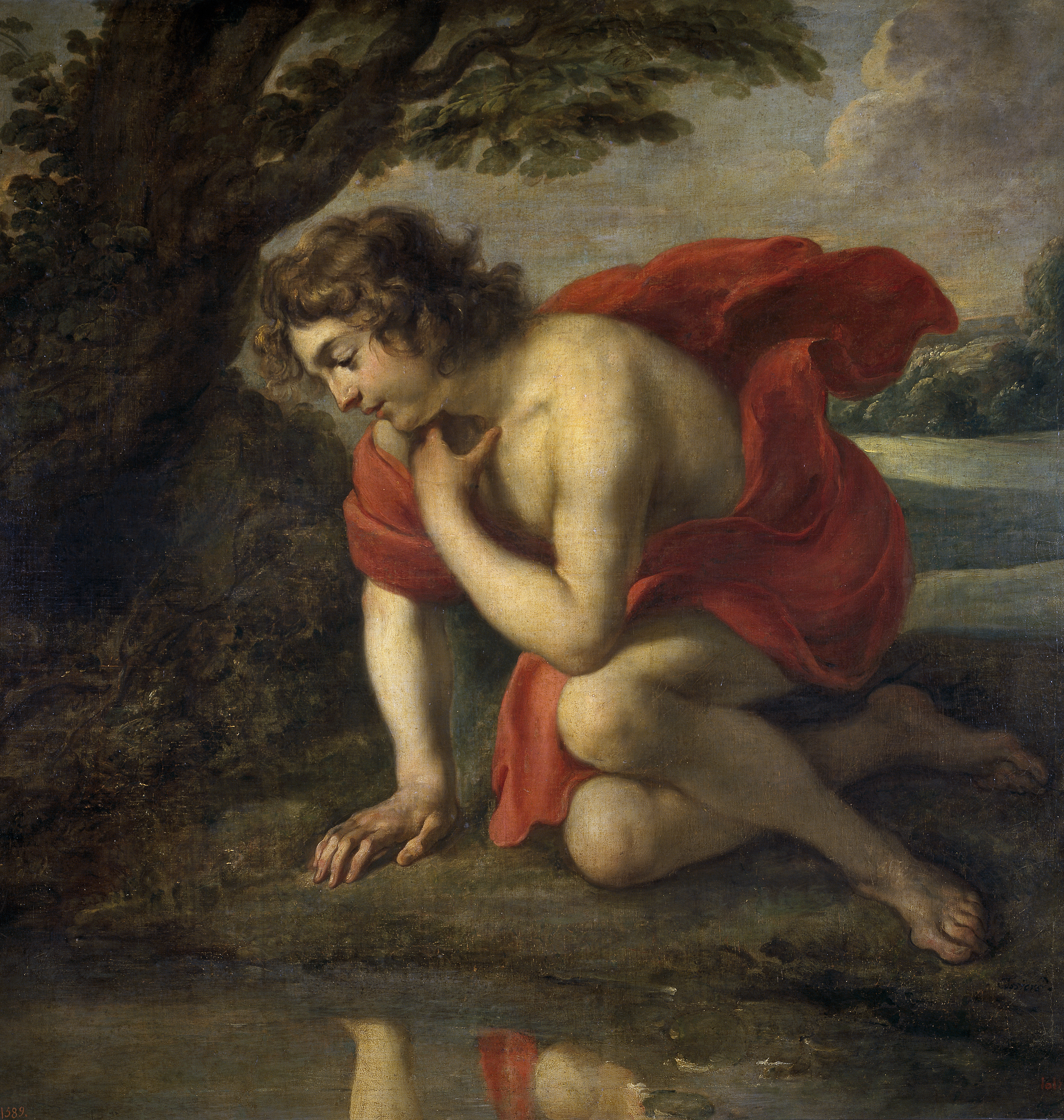
Narcissus

He travelled to Aix-en-Provence in France in 1623, where he stayed with and studied under the Dutch painter Abraham de Vries. He visited Rome where he is recorded in October 1624. In Rome he likely saw work of Caravaggio, which had an important influence on his work. He was back in Aix-en-Provence in 1626. Here he met Nicolas-Claude Fabri de Peiresc, the famous humanist and close friend of Peter Paul Rubens. Peiresc recommended Cossiers to Rubens. He also met up with other Flemish and Dutch artists such as Simon de Vos and Johan Geerlof as is shown by the group portrait by Simon de Vos referred to as Gathering of Smokers and Drinkers. This portrait is believed to show the three artist friends enjoying a smoke and a drink together during their residence in Aix-en Provence.

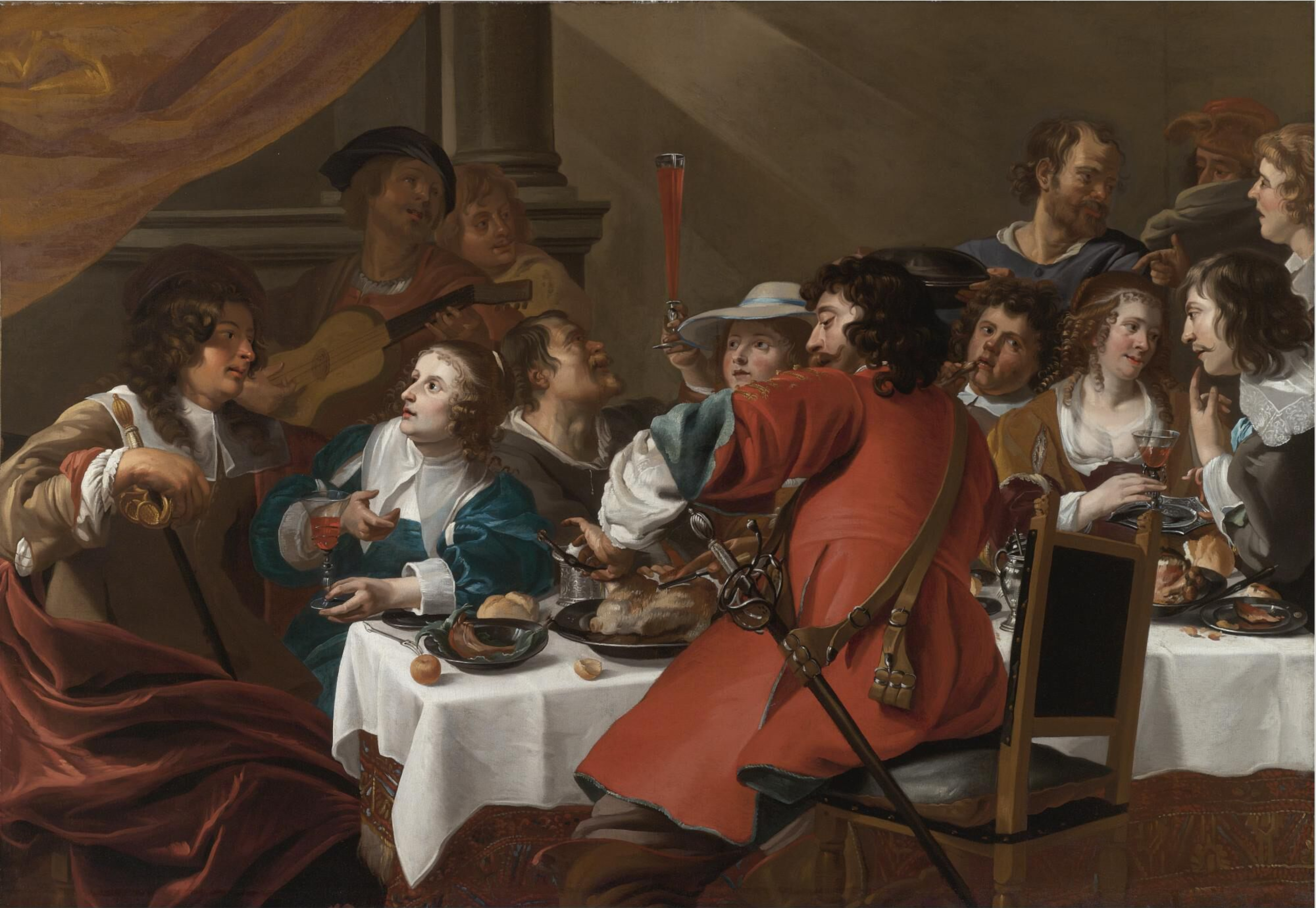
Banquet scene

Jan Cossiers returned to Antwerp in 1627. In the period between 18 September 1628 and 18 September 1629 he was admitted to the Antwerp Guild of Saint Luke as a 'wijnmeester' (a master who is the son of a master of the guild). It is possible that for a short while he was connected to Rubens' workshop. Apparently Rubens had chosen Cossiers to accompany him to Madrid in 1628 but Cossiers' parents had opposed the idea. In 1630 Cossiers married Joanna Darragon (or Dragon) in the St. James' Church in Antwerp. He became the dean of the local Guild of Saint Luke in 1640.

In the 1630s Cossiers was able to obtain a number of large commissions thanks to the intervention of Rubens. He assisted Rubens in 1635 in the decorations for the joyous entry of the Cardinal-Infante Ferdinand. Rubens had the overall management of this project. He further assisted with Rubens' commission for decorating the Torre de la Parada, a hunting lodge of Philip IV of Spain near Madrid. Cossiers painted mythological scenes after designs by Rubens. Other Antwerp artists such as the brothers Cornelis de Vos and Paul de Vos also worked on this large commission.

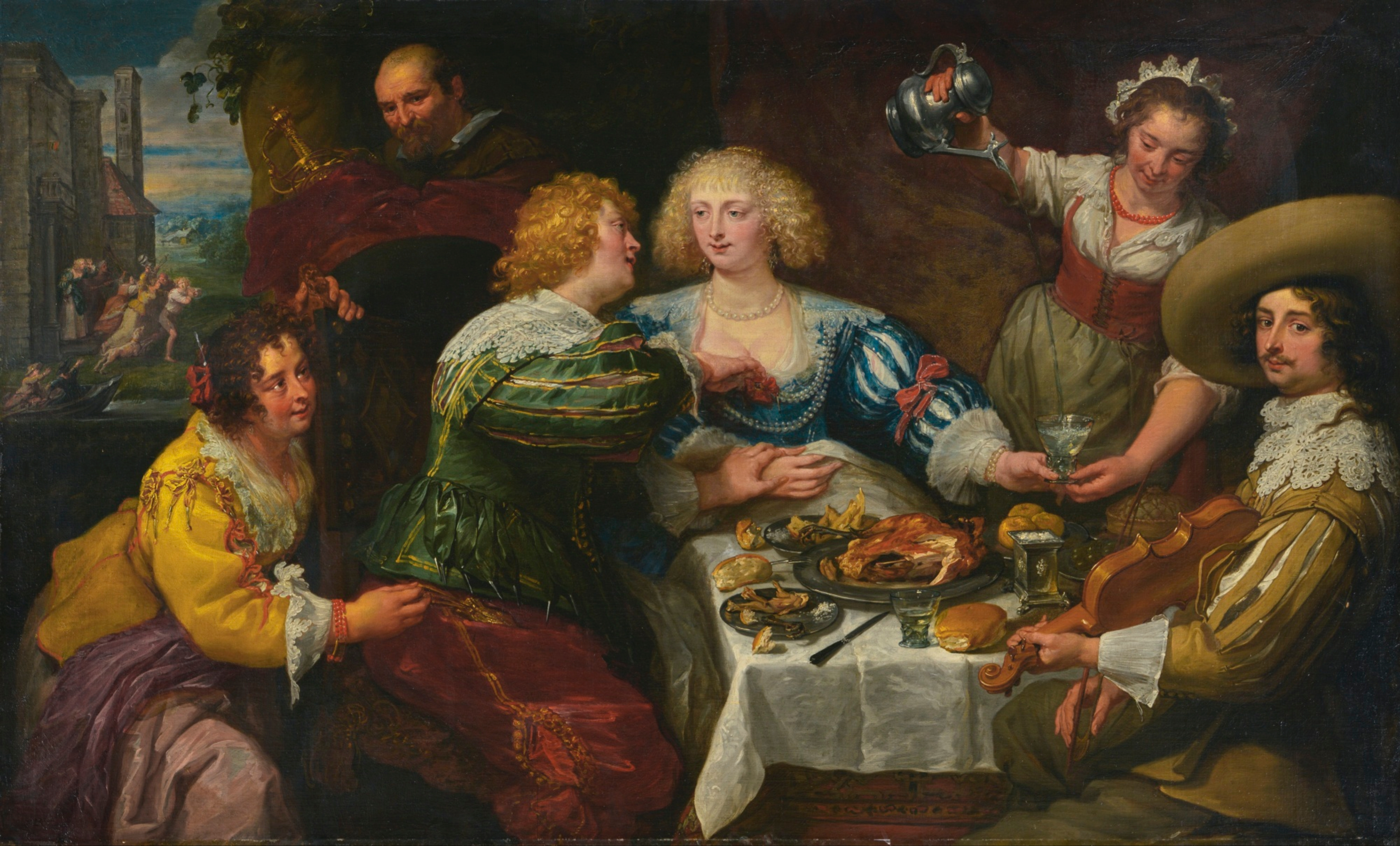
The Parable of the Prodigal Son

Cossiers enjoyed the patronage of the governors of the Southern Netherlands such as Cardinal-Infante Ferdinand and Archduke Leopold Wilhelm of Austria. After the death of Rubens in 1640 he was recognized as one of the leading history painters in Flanders and he received many commissions for Counter-Reformation altarpieces. He also was a portrait painter to the rich bourgeoisie. On 26 July of that year he married his second wife Maria van der Willigen. The couple had 11 children. He was elected a number of times as a 'consultor' of the 'Sodaliteit der getrouwden', a fraternity for married men established by the Jesuit order in Antwerp.

He had many pupils including Jan Carel van Bremt, Grée Melsen, Jacques (Jacob) de Langhe, Jacques de l'Ange (who may be identical to Jacques de Langhe), Carel van Savoyen and Franciscus van Verbist.

== Work ==
=== General ===
Jan Cossiers was a versatile artist who worked in various genres such as portraits, genre and history paintings. There was a clear evolution in Cossiers' career, which was not unlike that of some of his Antwerp contemporaries such as Simon de Vos and Theodoor Rombouts.

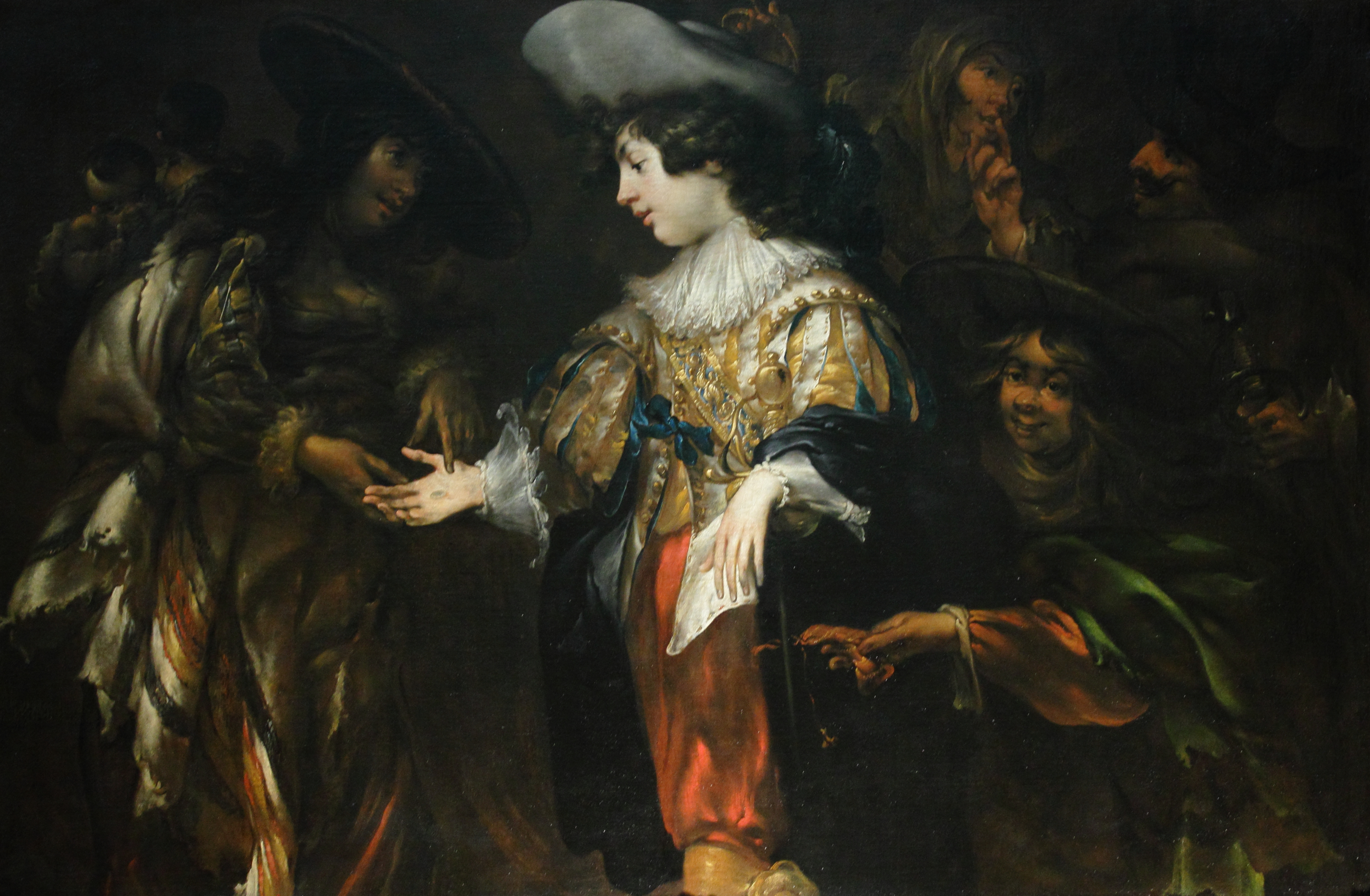
The fortune teller

Cossiers started out as a painter of Caravaggesque genre scenes. He later became involved in the execution of religious and mythological compositions that were part of the large commissions of the Rubens workshop in the 1630s. After the death of Rubens he became one of the leading painters of altarpieces in Flanders.

=== Low-life subjects in a Caravaggesque style ===
Jan Cossiers' early works were depictions of 'low-life' themes such as the prodigal son in a tavern, merry companies, smokers, drinkers, card players, backgammon players, fortune tellers, etc. Some of these works revisited the theme of the five senses popular in Flemish genre art.

These early works use the typical Caravaggesque chiaroscuro effects with dramatic lighting by a single light source so as to create dramatic effect and depth. An example of a work painted during this early period is the Fortune teller (Musée des beaux-arts, Valenciennes). It depicts a man in very elegant costume who is read his fortune by a gipsy woman. The man does not realise that his pocket is being picked by a young man. The light falls on the man creating a dramatic effect. Cossiers created many versions of this subject.

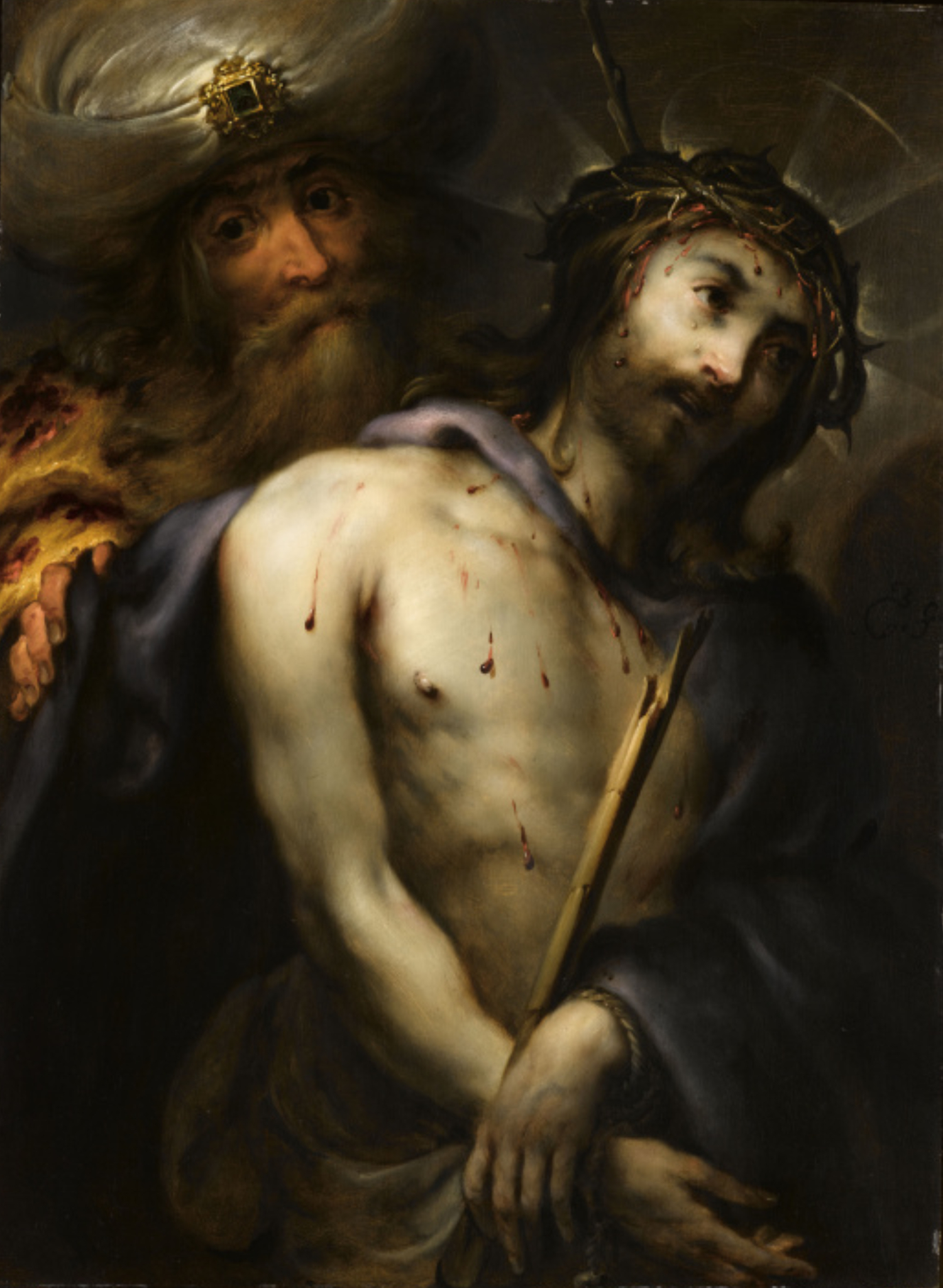
Ecce Homo

Another subject, which Cossiers reprised multiple times is that of the prodigal son. One version of this theme was auctioned at Sotheby's on 3 December 2014, New York, lot 31. It shows the prodigal son while feasting and drinking in a tavern, unaware that his pocket is being picked. In the background the son is shown being expelled from the inn after completely squandering his inheritance.

=== History subjects ===
In the 1630s Cossiers became connected to Rubens and commenced to paint history subjects. Examples are the mythological scenes he painted after designs by Rubens for the Torre de la Parada such as the Prometheus carrying fire, Narcissus and Jupiter and Lycaon (Prado Museum). During this period his work underwent the influence of the monumentality and palette of Rubens, whom he assisted on large commissions. After the death of Rubens he was able to fill the gap left by Rubens' enormous studio and supplied Counter-Reformation altarpieces to the many churches in Catholic Flanders as well as to the open market.

His works of the 1630s and 1640s were very colourful, which can be attributed to Rubens' influence. In his later works his palette became more subdued and his brushwork was applied more freely. His compositions in this late period emphasize the pathos of the figures through their exaggerated emotional expressions and lively gestures. An example is The Flagellation of Christ (Royal Museum of Fine Arts Antwerp). Among his late religious paintings is also the large Passion of Christ (1655–6) in the Church of the Beguines in Mechelen.

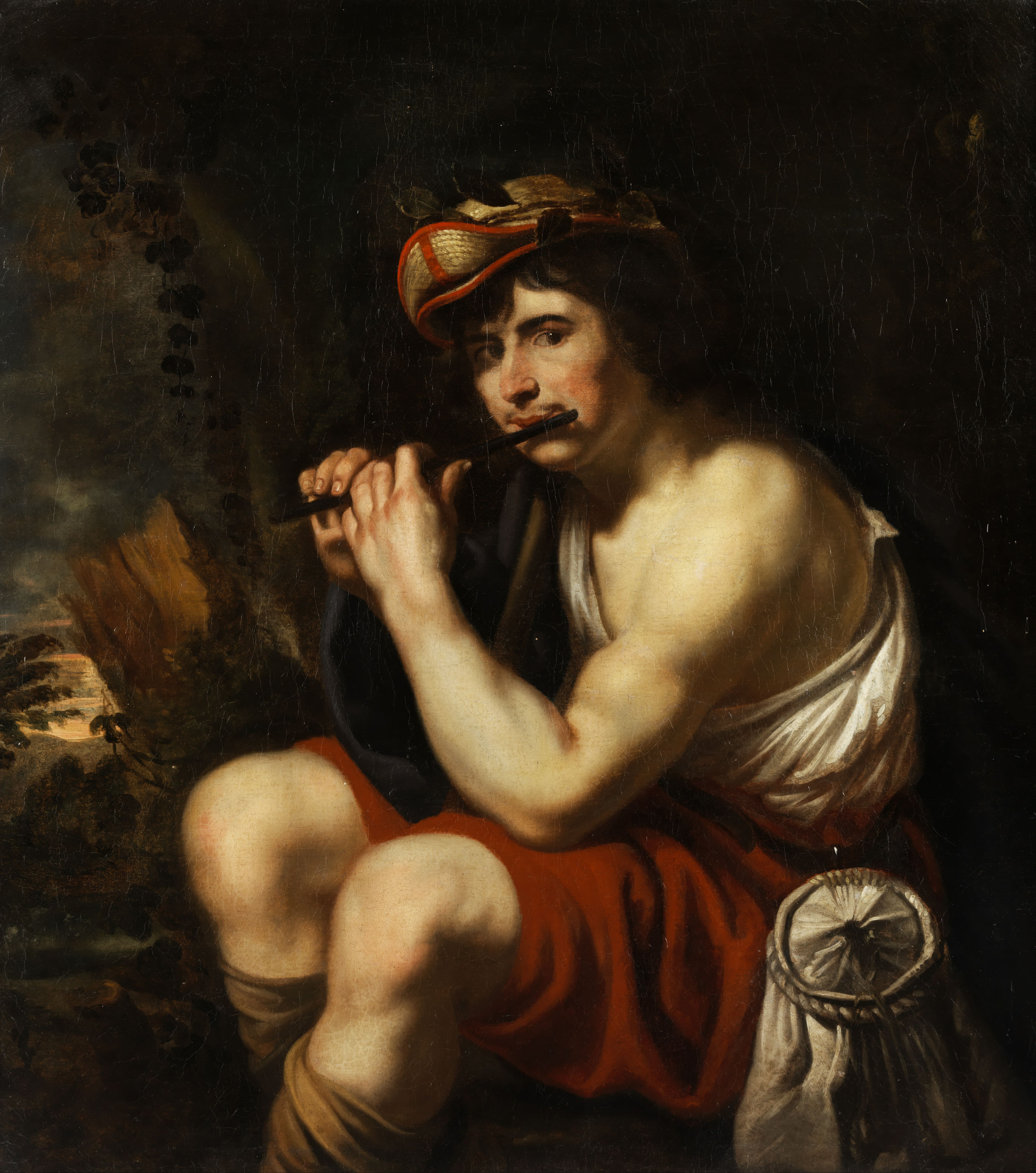
Young musician with a traverse flute

Jan Cossiers did not entirely abandon the low life themes in this later stage of his career as shown by a late Merry Company (Auctioned at Sotheby's 9 July 2011, New York, lot 39), which has the freedom of the brushwork and the subdued coloring of Cossiers' later period.

=== Portraits ===
Jan Cossiers had received his training from leading portrait painters such as Cornelis de Vos and Abraham de Vries. He had thus learned the necessary skills to cater to the demand of the well-off bourgeoisie for individual and group portraits.

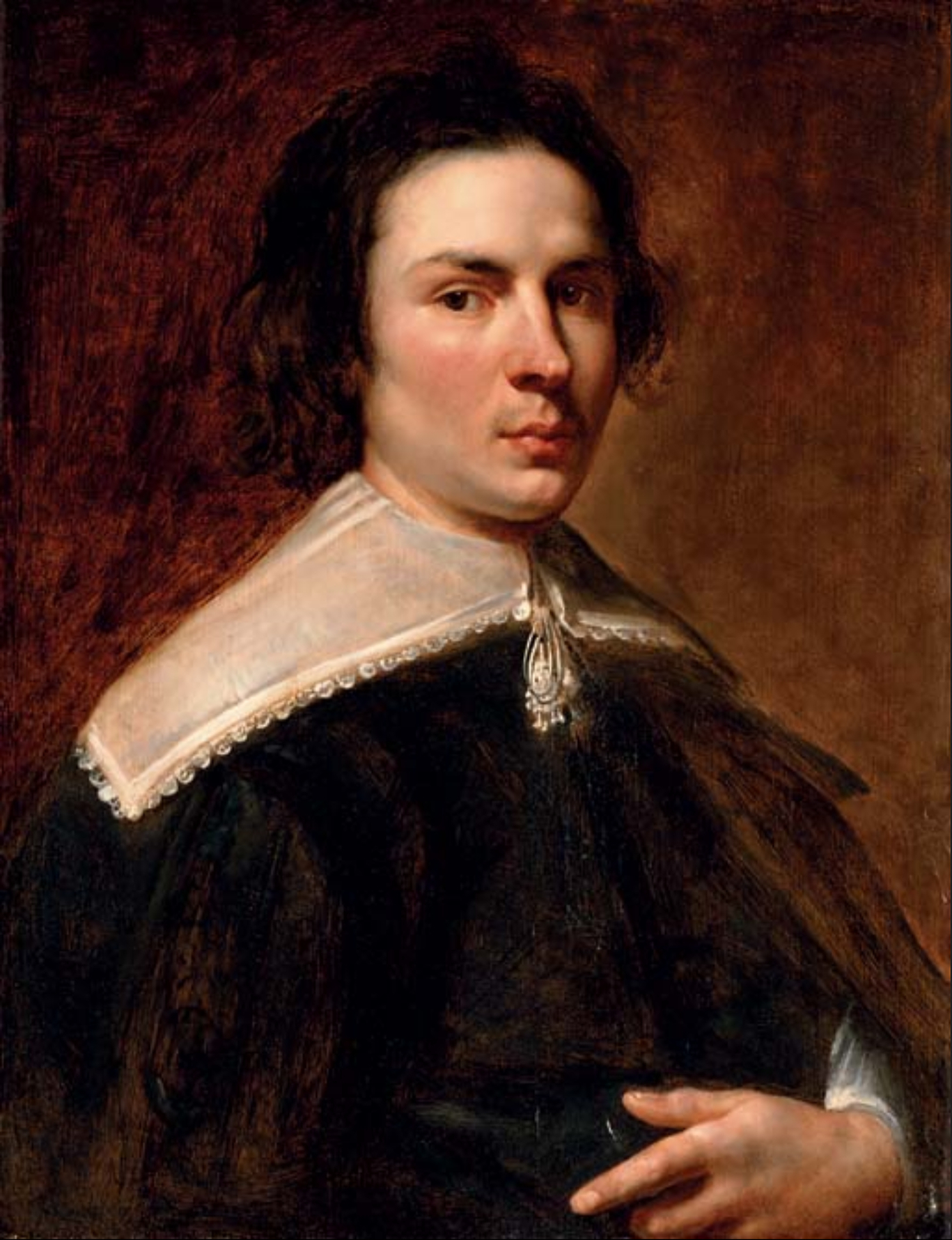
Portrait of a gentleman

His portraits are characterised by their sensitive likenesses, psychological insight and casual elegance. In the Portrait of a gentleman (Auctioned at Christie's on 19 April 2007, New York, lot 226) Jan Cossiers was able to portray the sitter's self-assured and dignified nature through details such as the sitter's left hand, which is resting securely at his waist.

Jan Cossiers moved in the circle of the famous Flemish genre painter Adriaen Brouwer who was known, amongst others, for his tronies, i.e. head or facial studies, which investigate varieties of expression. Brouwer painted a tavern scene called The Smokers, which included tronie-style portraits of Jan Cossiers together with the painters Jan Lievens, Joos van Craesbeeck (1600–1671), Jan Davidsz. de Heem and Brouwer himself (c. 1636, Metropolitan Museum of Art, New York). Jan Cossiers is the second figure on the right and appears to have smoke in his mouth, as if tasting it before exhaling. This type of group portrait doubled as a representation of one of the five senses (in this case the sense of taste).

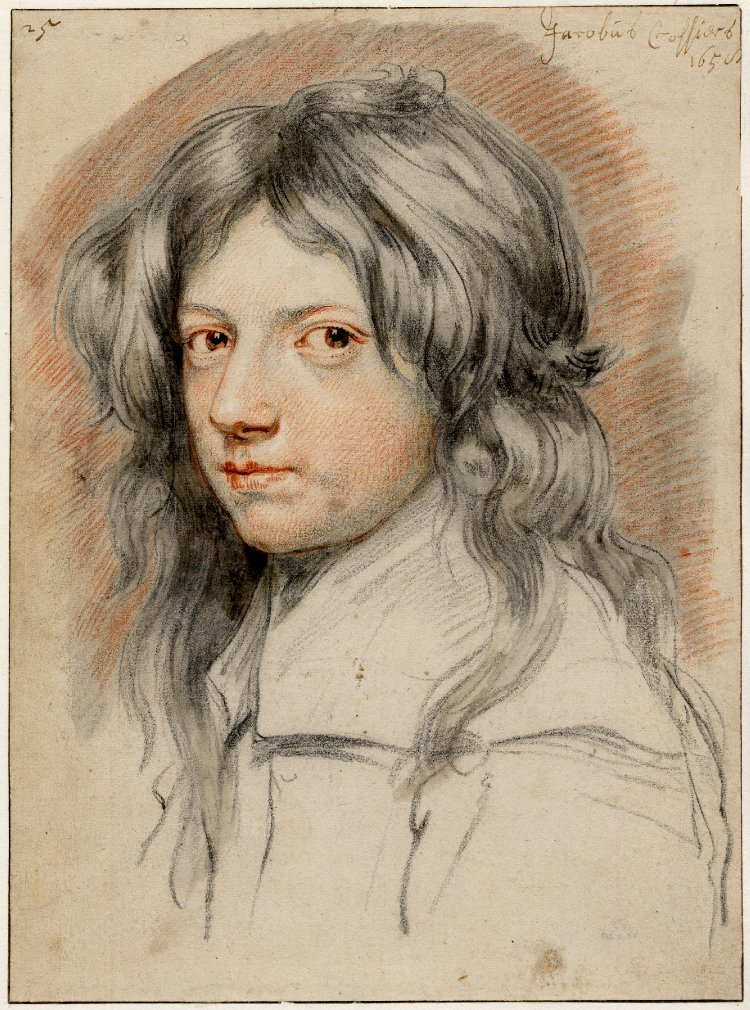
Portrait of young man

Jan Cossiers also painted a number of genre portraits that represent the five senses. These portraits can at the same time be regarded as tronies. Examples are the portraits of A man looking into his empty tankard (Sold at Hampel (München), 2011-03-25 - 2011-03-26, lot 207) and Portrait of a gentleman, said to be Adriaen Brouwer (Sold at Bonhams on 5 July 2006, London, lot 46), which are likely portraits of Adriaen Brouwer as well as representations of the sense of taste. The paintings are believed to be part of a series on the five senses.

As was common in Antwerp's art world at the time, Cossiers collaborated with other specialist artists, for whom he painted the figures. A garland portrait of Huygens by Cossiers and Daniel Seghers is now in the Mauritshuis. He is known to have collaborated with the still life and animal painter Adriaen van Utrecht on a kitchen scene (dated 1639, private collection). Cossiers painted the portraits of van Utrecht and his wife Constancia in a kitchen amidst an extensive still life with game, lobster, fish and vegetables painted by van Utrecht.

=== Drawings ===
Cossiers was a very accomplished draughtsman, which is shown by a number of portraits of children, including his own.

Cossiers made a series of portrait studies of his family members. Each of the drawings is numbered in the top left and most identify the sitter by name and are dated 1658. The series is characterized by the intimate treatment and particularly lifelike effects. The surviving portraits only depict the artist's sons and not his five daughters. These portraits are executed in a very varied and fluid manner.
