= Herman de Neyt =

Herman de Neyt (12 March 1588 in Antwerp – 8 September 1642 in Delft) was a painter and art dealer active in Antwerp. At the time of his death the probate inventory of the items in his home, which included both his personal collection and art for the market, listed over 850 paintings. These included 15th-, 16th- and 17th-century works by Italian masters, earlier northern artists and contemporary Flemish painters. Peter Paul Rubens was well represented in his collection, while as a painter he trained Adriaen van Utrecht.
