= Simon de Vos =

Flemish painter (1603–1676)

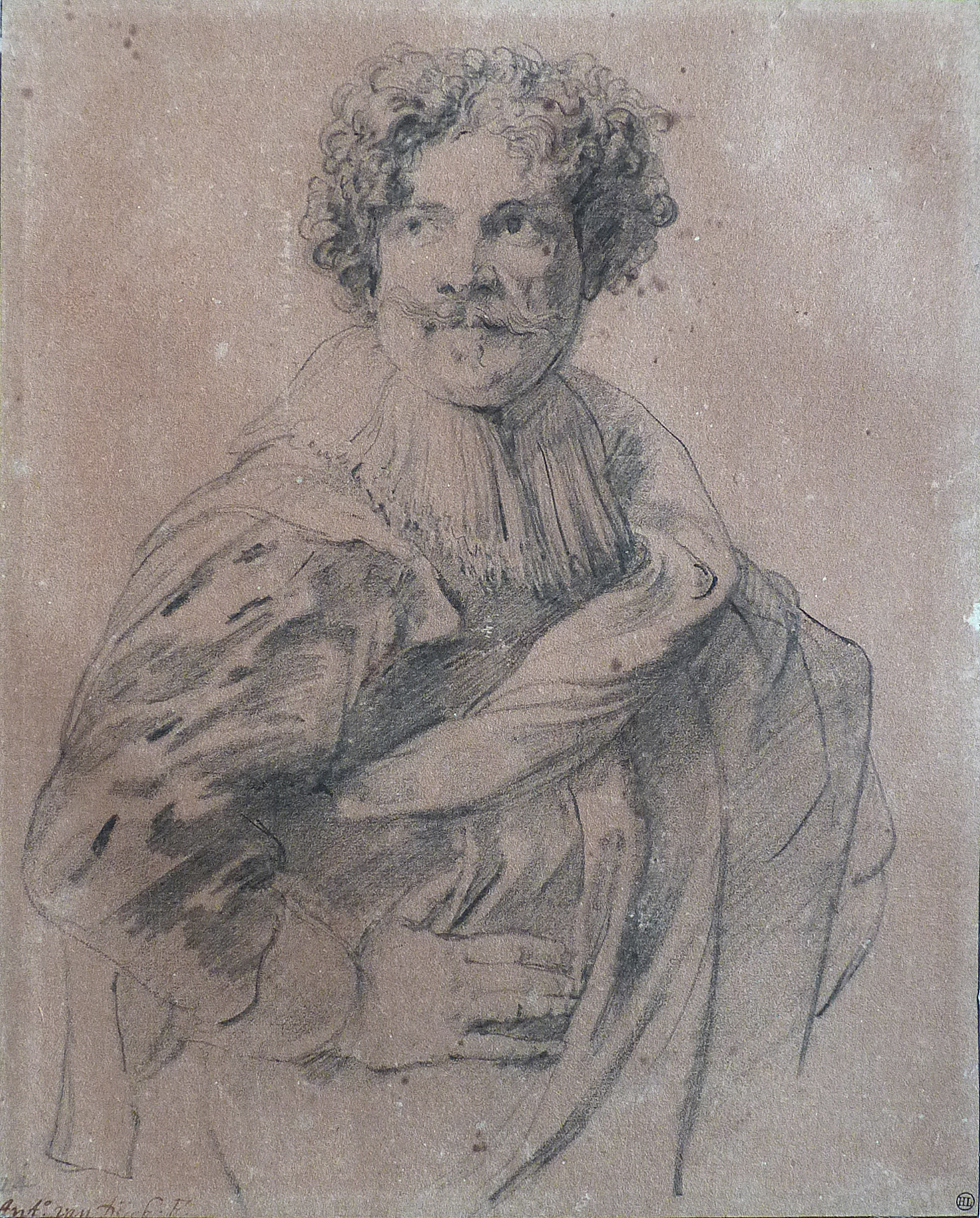
Portrait by van Dyck, 1630s

Simon de Vos (20 October 1603 – 15 October 1676) was a Flemish painter, draughtsman and art collector. He started his career making small-format cabinet pictures of genre scenes, in particular of Caravaggesque merry companies. Later he switched to history painting, working on larger formats in a Flemish Baroque style which was influenced by Rubens and van Dyck.

== Life ==
Simon de Vos was born in Antwerp as the son of the dice maker Herman de Vos and Elisabeth van Oppen.

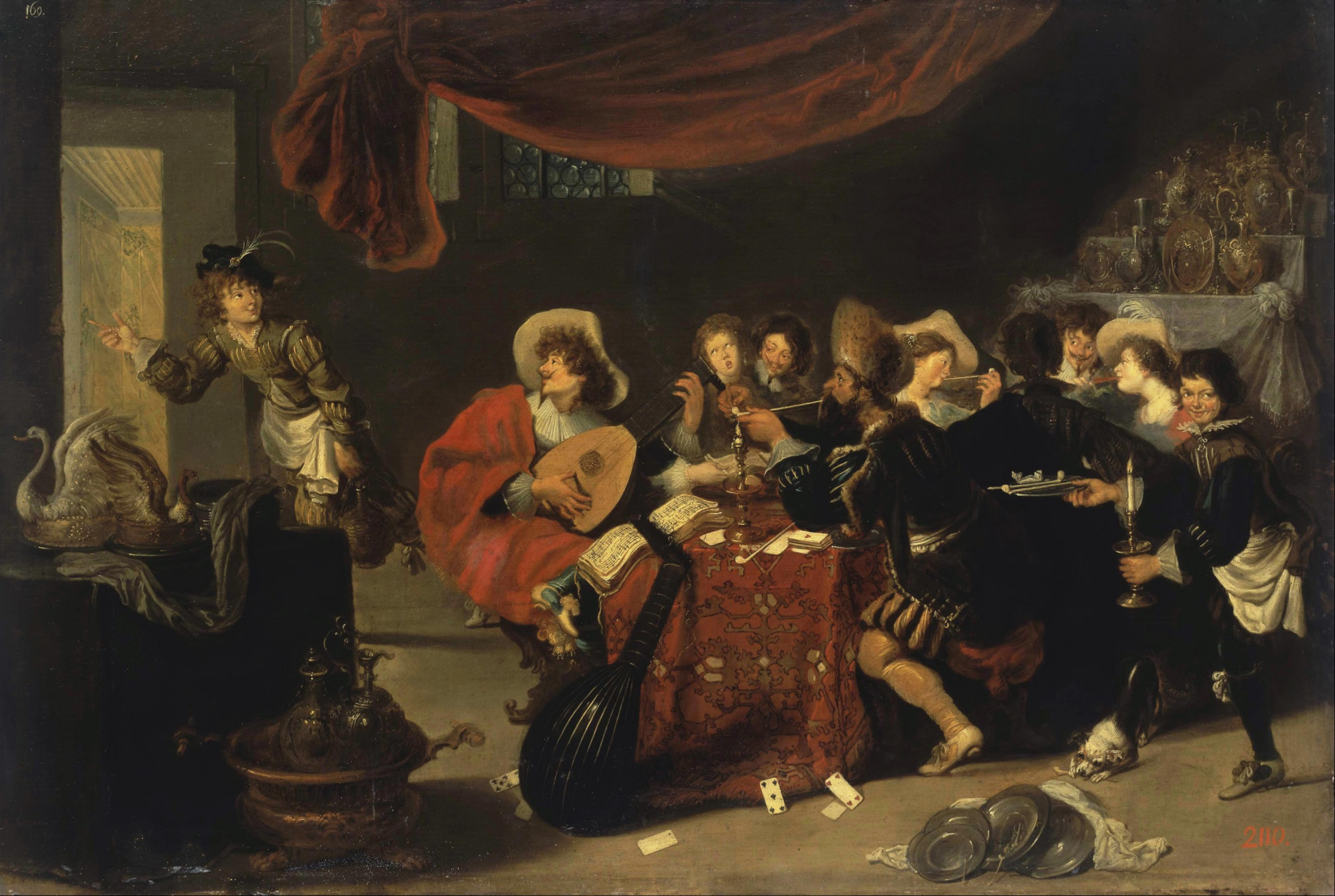
Merry Company, 1631

At only 12 years old de Vos started his art studies in 1615 with the eminent portrait painter Cornelis de Vos (1584–1651), to whom he was not related. Upon completion of his training in 1620, he became at the young age of 17 a master in Antwerp's Guild of Saint Luke.

There is uncertainty about de Vos's movements after he became a master. It is possible that he stayed in Antwerp, where he may have worked in the workshop of Peter Paul Rubens. Alternatively, he may have travelled abroad. A stay in Rome is suggested by his early works, which show a similarity with the "low-life" genre paintings of the group of Dutch and Flemish painters active in Rome known as the Bamboccianti. An influence by the German painter Johann Liss active in Rome in the 1620s has been discerned in de Vos's paintings and may also be explained by a residence in Rome. In addition, on the basis of the attribution to Simon de Vos of a 1626 composition referred to as Gathering of Smokers and Drinkers (Louvre Museum, Paris) it is believed that de Vos resided in Aix-en-Provence in France in the mid-1620s.

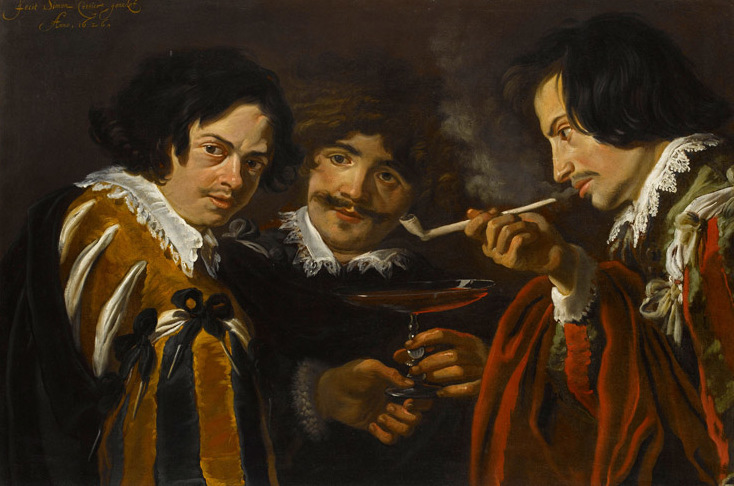
Gathering of Smokers and Drinkers, 1626

De Vos must have returned to his hometown in 1626 as in that year he married Catharina van Utrecht, a sister of the Antwerp still life painter Adriaen van Utrecht. The couple remained childless. He worked in Antwerp for most of his life. He is known to have supplied art works for the Antwerp art dealers Forchondt and Chrysostoom van Immerseel. He enjoyed the respect of his peers as is shown by the fact that when Rubens died his estate included one of his pictures. De Vos was successful financially. When his wife died in 1670 he possessed four properties in Antwerp and owned a collection of 290 paintings.

Between 1629 and 1649 he received 6 pupils. These included Gregori de Greeff, the other Jan van Kessel (ca. 1620-in of na 1661), Jan van Kessel the Elder and Caspar van Opstal.

== Work ==
=== Early work: genre paintings ===
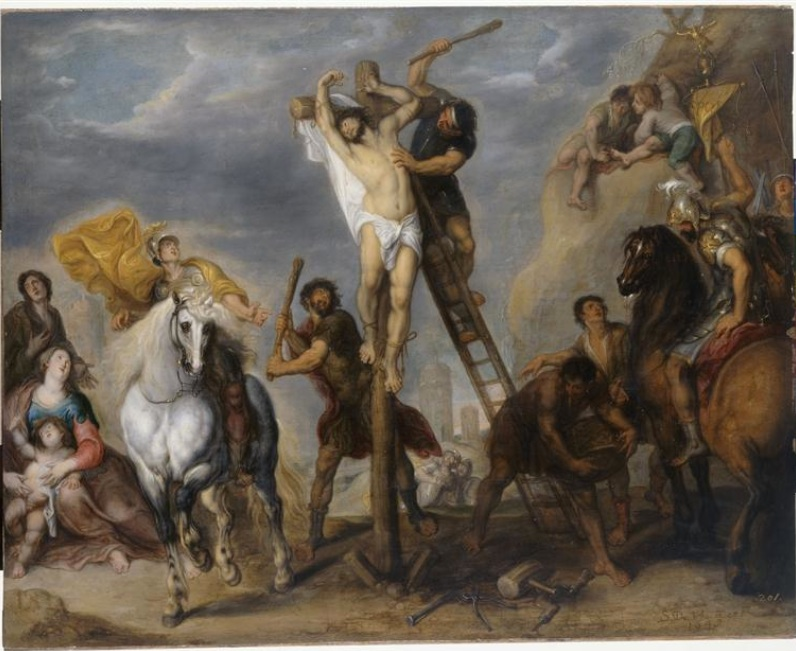
Martyrdom of St Philip, 1645–1648

De Vos's first works were cabinet pictures of genre scenes, including various merry companies and group portraits. These are composed in a Mannerist, pyramidical construction. The settings are loosely sketched in and the colours are rich and often gaudy. His style in this period is close to that of the German painter Johann Liss—active in Italy during the 1620s—(particularly in the Caravaggesque treatment of the merry company scenes) and Frans Francken the Younger. It also showed the influence of the Caravaggists of Utrecht.

The Fortune Teller, 1639

An example of a painting from this period is the Gathering of Smokers and Drinkers (Louvre Museum, Paris) of 1626. The painting depicts three young men at half-length who are enjoying a pipe and a glass of wine. The persons represented are assumed to be Simon de Vos himself (in the middle), flanked on the left by Jan Cossiers and on the right by Johan Geerlof. Cossiers and Geerlof were two artist friends of de Vos who had also settled in Aix-en-Provence. Typical for his early work, Simon de Vos painted the faces in this composition with thick features and eyes set wide apart. The painting's composition, tightly framing three half-length figures, is clearly influenced by the Caravaggists of Utrecht. Simon de Vos used the light effects typical of the Caravaggists by lighting the artists' faces from the painting's left-hand side, making the faces stand out against the neutral background. The inspiration for the picture may have been the early works of Caravaggio himself, which Simon de Vos may have seen if he visited Rome.

His works from the late 1620s until around 1640, which were made after returning to Antwerp, are mostly small "merry company" and courtly genre scenes reminiscent of contemporary Dutch painters Dirck Hals and Pieter Codde.

=== Later work: history paintings ===
After 1640, de Vos turned almost entirely away from genre scenes and painted mostly religious, history subjects and allegorical scenes, influenced stylistically at first by Rubens and then increasingly by Anthony van Dyck. Examples include The Martyrdom of St Philip (c. 1645–1648) in the Royal Museum of Fine Arts, Antwerp.

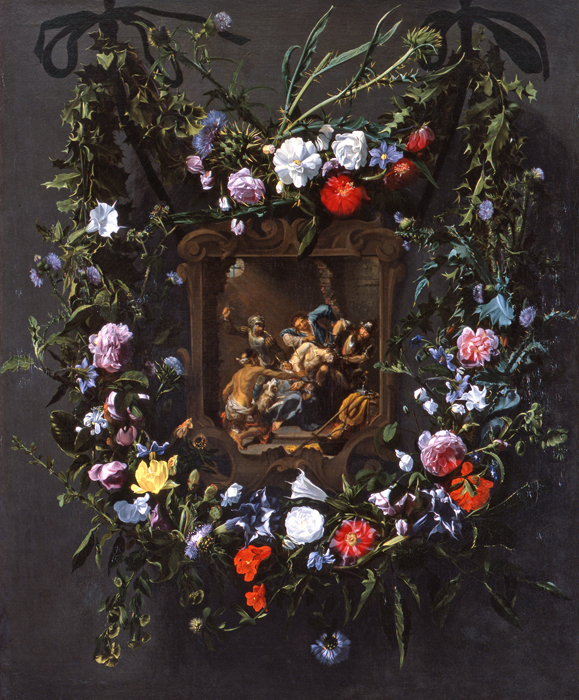
Garland of flowers surrounding a mocking of Christ

These later works were generally larger in format but used the compositional formulae of the cabinet paintings and therefore appear to lack balance. During this period he also created a 12-part series from Genesis (1635–44; Seville Cathedral and elsewhere), which includes a large number of animals. It is therefore assumed that Simon de Vos was likely a specialist in the field of animal painting.

=== Collaborations ===
As was current practice in Antwerp in the 17th century, de Vos often collaborated with other artists who were specialists in their field.

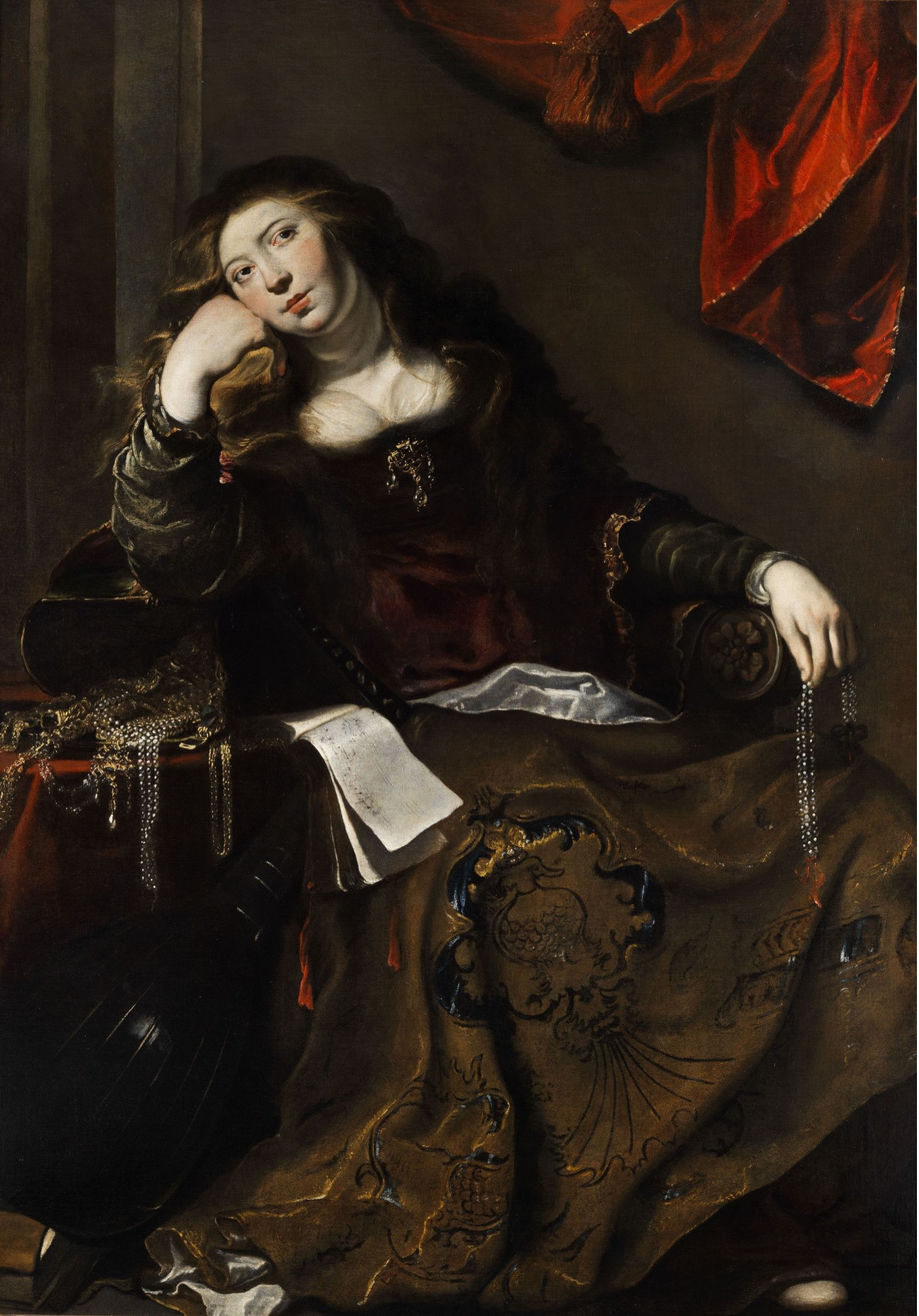
Allegory of Vanitas

He is known to have collaborated with the flower painter Daniel Seghers and Alexander Adriaenssen on so-called 'garland paintings'. Garland paintings are a special type of still life developed in Antwerp by Jan Brueghel the Elder in collaboration with the Italian cardinal Federico Borromeo at the beginning of the 17th century. The genre was initially connected to the visual imagery of the Counter-Reformation movement. It was further inspired by the cult of veneration and devotion to Mary prevalent at the Habsburg court (then the rulers over the Southern Netherlands) and in Antwerp generally. Garland paintings typically show a flower garland around a devotional image, portrait or other religious symbol (such as the host). Garland paintings were usually collaborations between a still life painter and a figure painter.

An example of a collaboration between de Vos and Seghers on a garland painting is A Garland of Flowers Surrounding a Mocking of Christ (c. 1643, Nasher Museum of Art), which shows a garland of flowers painted by Daniel Seghers surrounding a cartouche depicting the mocking of Christ by de Vos. De Vos also collaborated with the animal painter Frans Snyders.
