= Ballroom =

Large room for a dance party

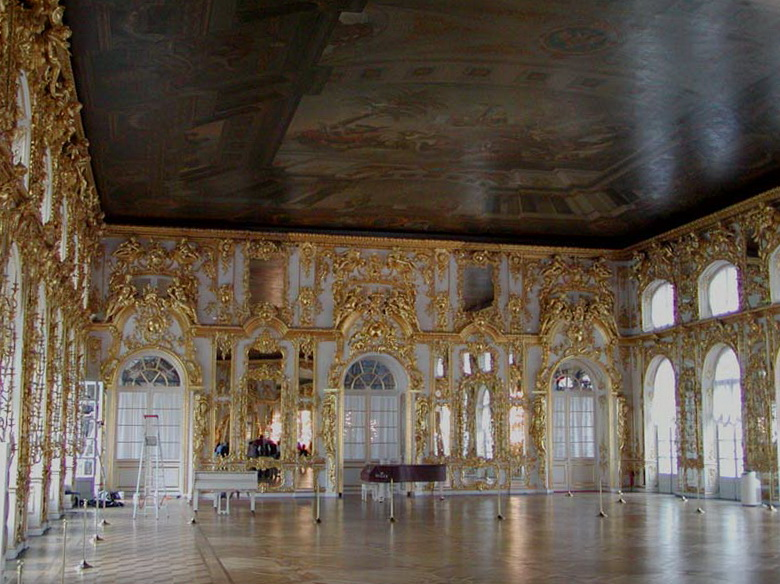
An opulent ballroom at the Catherine Palace near St. Petersburg, Russia

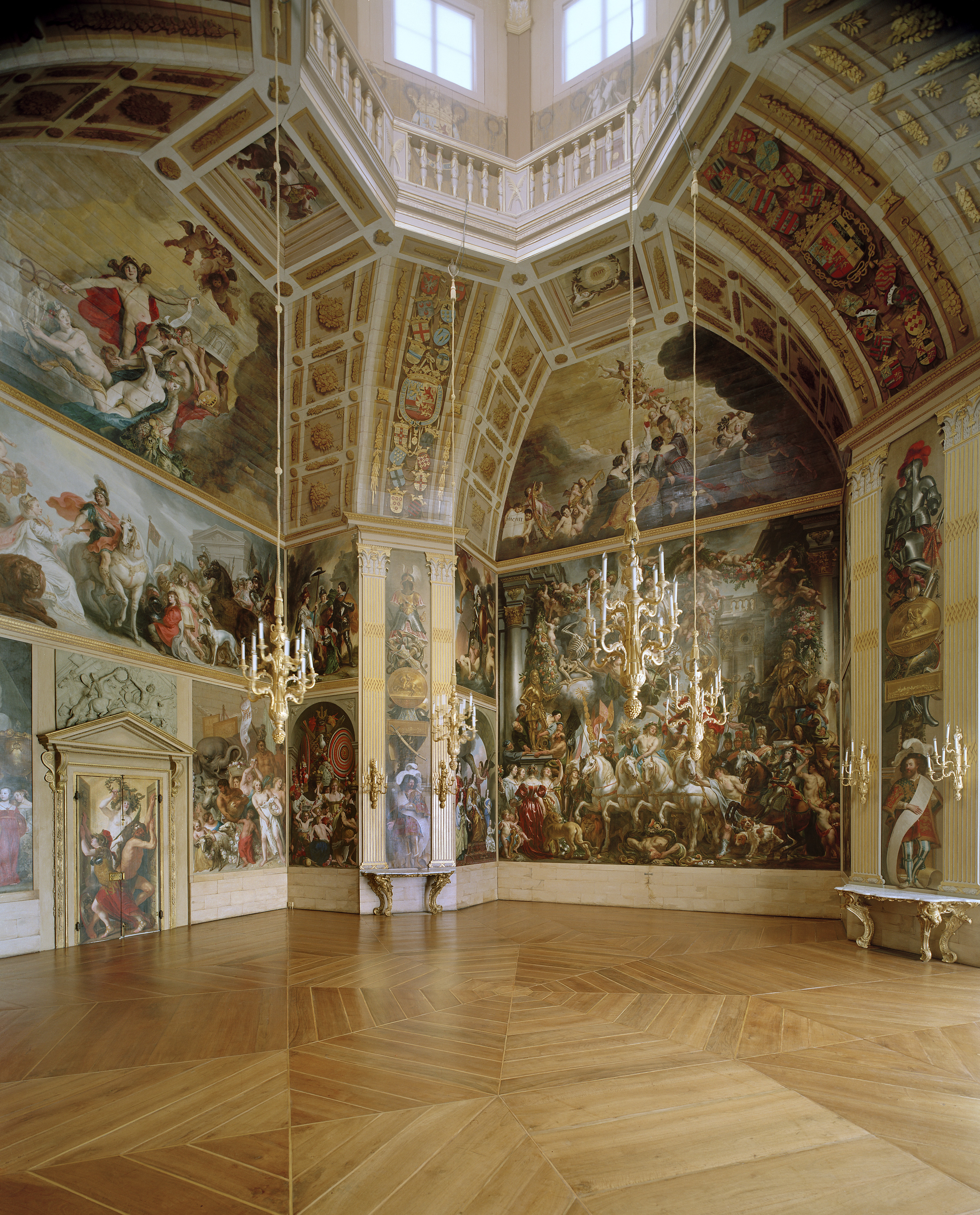
The Oranjezaal in palace Huis ten Bosch in The Hague, The Netherlands

A ballroom or ballhall is a large room for holding large formal parties called balls. Traditionally, most balls were held in private residences; many mansions and palaces, especially historic mansions and palaces, contain one or more ballrooms. In other large houses, a large room such as the main drawing room, long gallery, or hall may double as a ballroom, but a good ballroom should have the right type of flooring, such as hardwood flooring or stone flooring (usually marble or stone).. For most styles of modern dance, a wooden sprung floor offers the best surface.

In later times, the term "ballroom" has been used to describe nightclubs where customers dance; the Top Rank Suites in the United Kingdom, for example, were also often referred to as ballrooms. The phrase "having a ball" has grown to encompass many events where person(s) are having fun, not just dancing.

Ballrooms are generally quite large, and may have ceilings higher than other rooms in the same building. The large amount of space for dancing, as well as the highly formal tone of events, has given rise to ballroom dancing. The largest balls are now nearly always held in public buildings, and many hotels have a ballroom. They are also designed large to help the sound of orchestras carry well throughout the whole room.

In basketball's early history as a sport, there were some teams like the Philadelphia Sphas (a historic Jewish basketball team in Philadelphia) alongside the Naismith Basketball Hall of Fame worthy Original Celtics (a historic Irish immigrant settled basketball team from New York City) and New York Renaissance (a historic all-black black basketball team in a segregationist era within New York City) teams who would turn the ballroom areas in places like the Broadwood Hotel, the Century Theatre, and the Harlem Renaissance Ballroom & Casino into early basketball courts for early games for people to watch when entering these buildings before staying after a match to dance the rest of the night away afterward (usually occurring upon a Friday night or during the weekend, though it wasn't always considered the case). The few teams that did that helped promote the businesses that afforded their services by providing affordable entertainment with both a good sporting match and a fun dance for the audience to attend in themselves soon afterward.

A special case is the annual Vienna Opera Ball, where, just for one night, the auditorium of the Vienna State Opera is turned into a large ballroom. On the eve of the event, the rows of seats are removed from the stalls, and a new floor, level with the stage, is built.

Sometimes ballrooms have stages in the front of the room where the host or a special guest can speak. That stage can also be used for instrumentalists and musical performers.

== See also ==
- Aragon Ballroom in Santa Monica, US
- Clärchens Ballroom in Berlin, Germany
- Ballroom an album of Irish music by De Dannan
- Nightclub
