= Triumph of Frederick Henry, Prince of Orange =

1652 painting by Jacob Jordaens

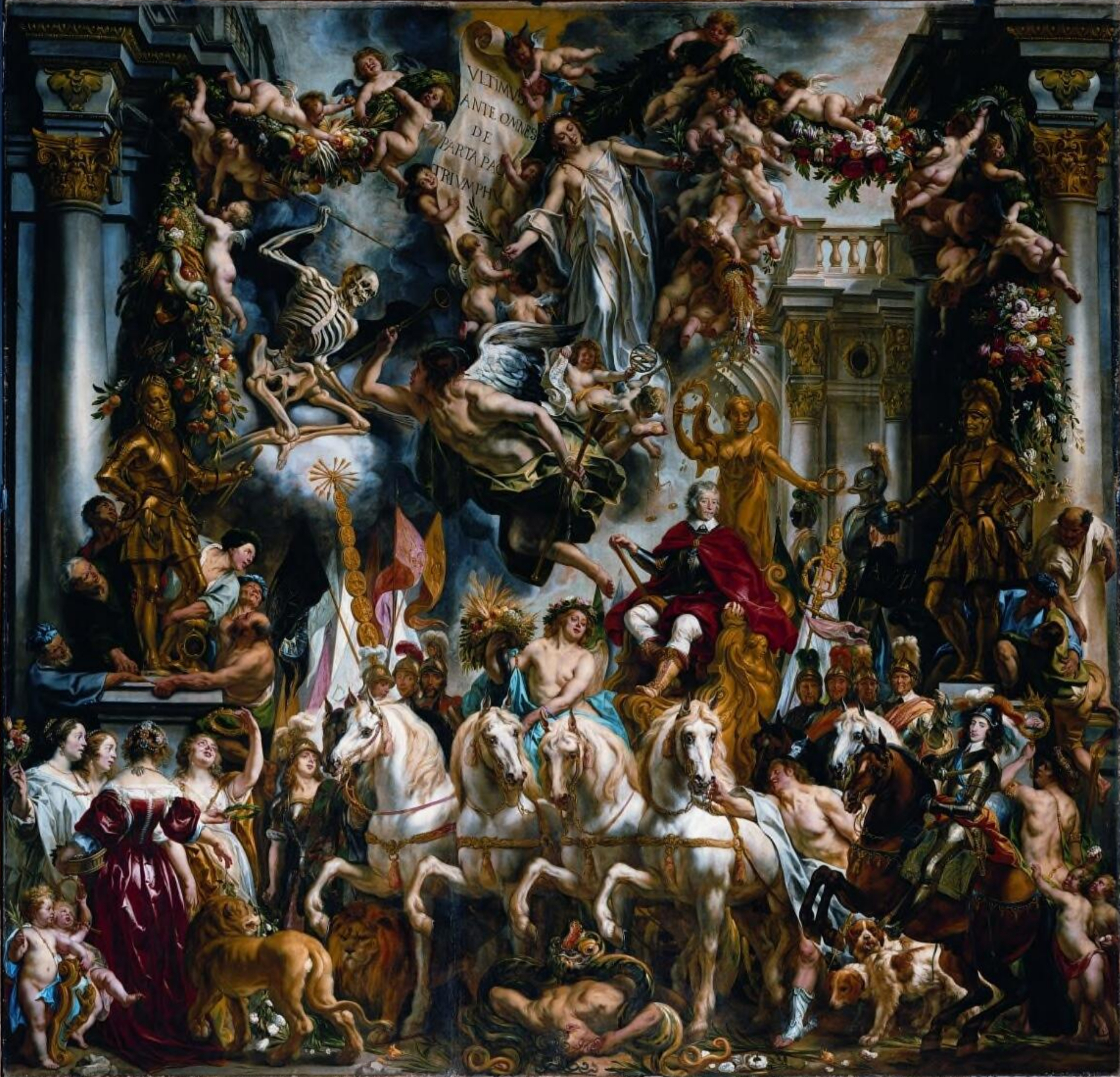
- Artist: Jacob Jordaens
- Year: 1652
- Medium: oil on canvas
- Movement: Baroque
- Dimensions: 728 cm × 755 cm (287 in × 297 in)
- Location: Oranjezaal in the Huis ten Bosch, The Hague

Triumph of Frederick Henry, Prince of Orange is an oil on canvas painting by the Flemish painter Jacob Jordaens, signed and dated at the bottom left "J JOR fec / 1652". It is located in the Oranjezaal in the Huis ten Bosch in The Hague.

== History ==
The Huis ten Bosch, now a Dutch royal residence, was built on a site near The Hague, given to Frederick Henry, Prince of Orange in 1645 by the Dutch Republic. In 1647, before it was completed, Frederick Henry died and his devoted widow Amalia of Solms-Braunfels designed to make substantial changes to the design, turning it into a memorial to her late husband.

The Huis ten Bosch's main hall, the Oranjezaal, was decorated with a vast cycle of paintings celebrating the deeds and virtues of Frederick Henry. The idea for creating such a room dedicated to praising a national leader was taken from Peter Paul Rubens' Marie de' Medici cycle in Paris and the allegorical ceiling paintings of James I of England in the Banqueting House in London. Various painters, from both the Dutch Republic and the Spanish Netherlands. were commissioned to create paintings for the cycle. Triumph was the culmination of the cycle. Jordaens had already been patronised by Princess Amalia of Solms-Braunfels and created the Allegory of Time for the same room in 1650. After the death of both Rubens and Anthony van Dyck, Jordaens was now the leading painter of the Spanish Netherlands.

Amalia took on her husband's former secretary Constantijn Huygens and the architect Jacob van Campen to supervise the painting of the Oranjezaal cycle. Letters survive from Jordaens to Huygens, showing that Van Campen sent a plan of the room to the painter and that he proposed a number of modifications to his original idea. Three oil sketches for the ceiling by Jordaens also survive, probably produced for Amalia's and Van Campen's approval. None of the sketches totally matches the final painting, probably showing that not all of the painter's proposals were approved. Another letter survives from Jordaens to Amalia, explaining the allegorical meanings of the finished work.

== Preparatory sketches ==
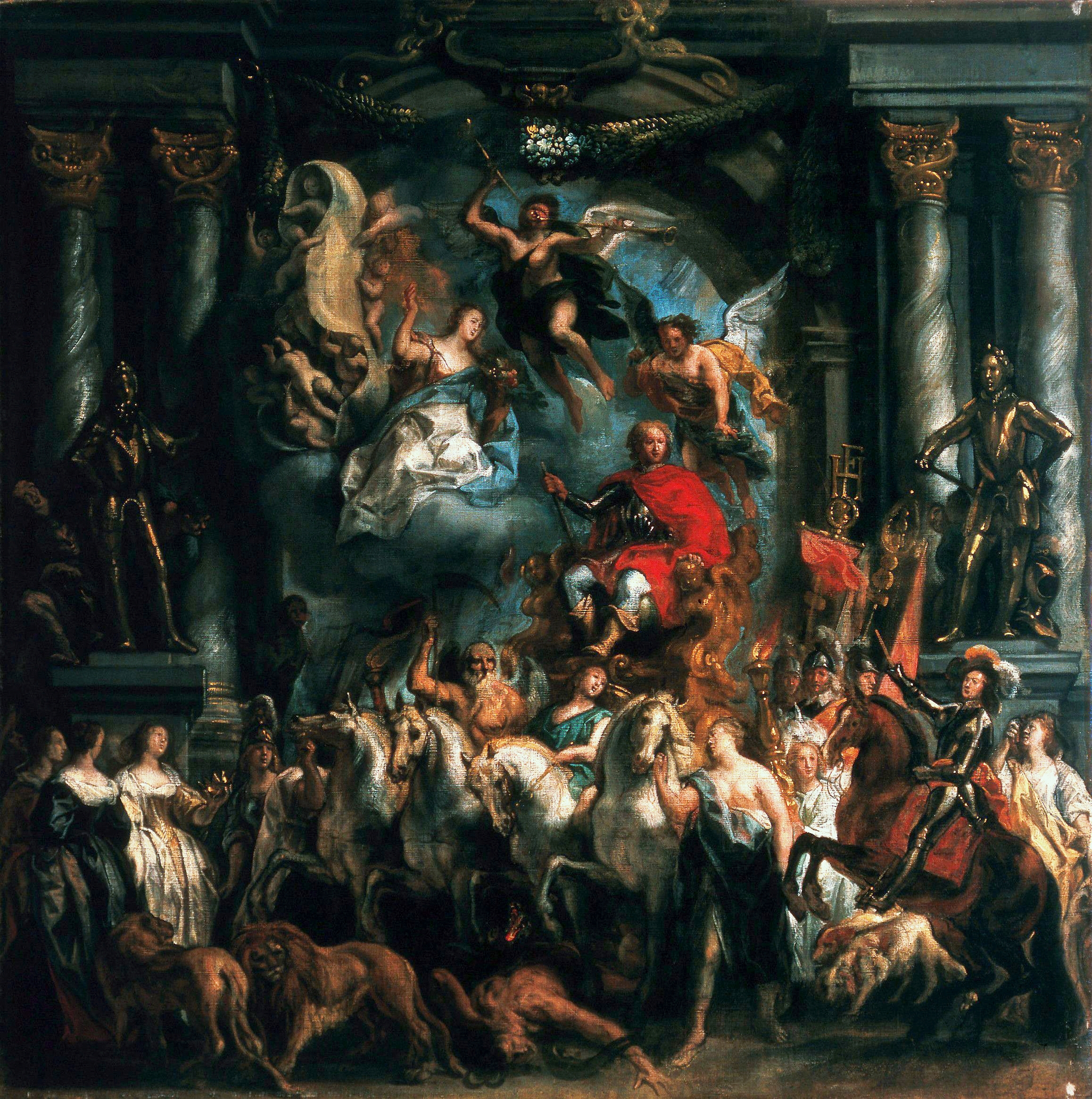
Sketch, c.1651, National Museum of Warsaw

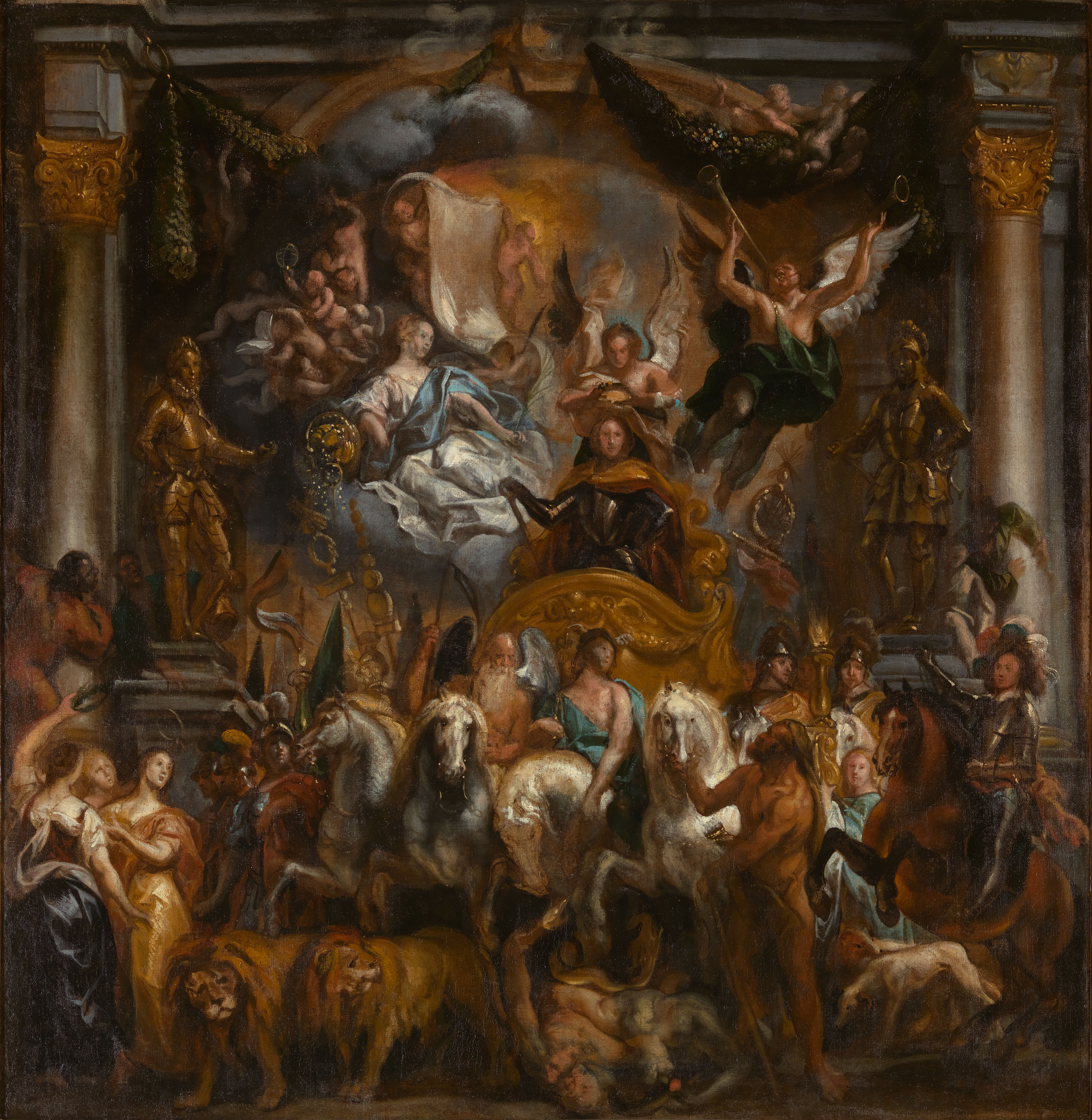
Sketch, c.1651, Royal Museum of Fine Arts of Belgium, Brussels

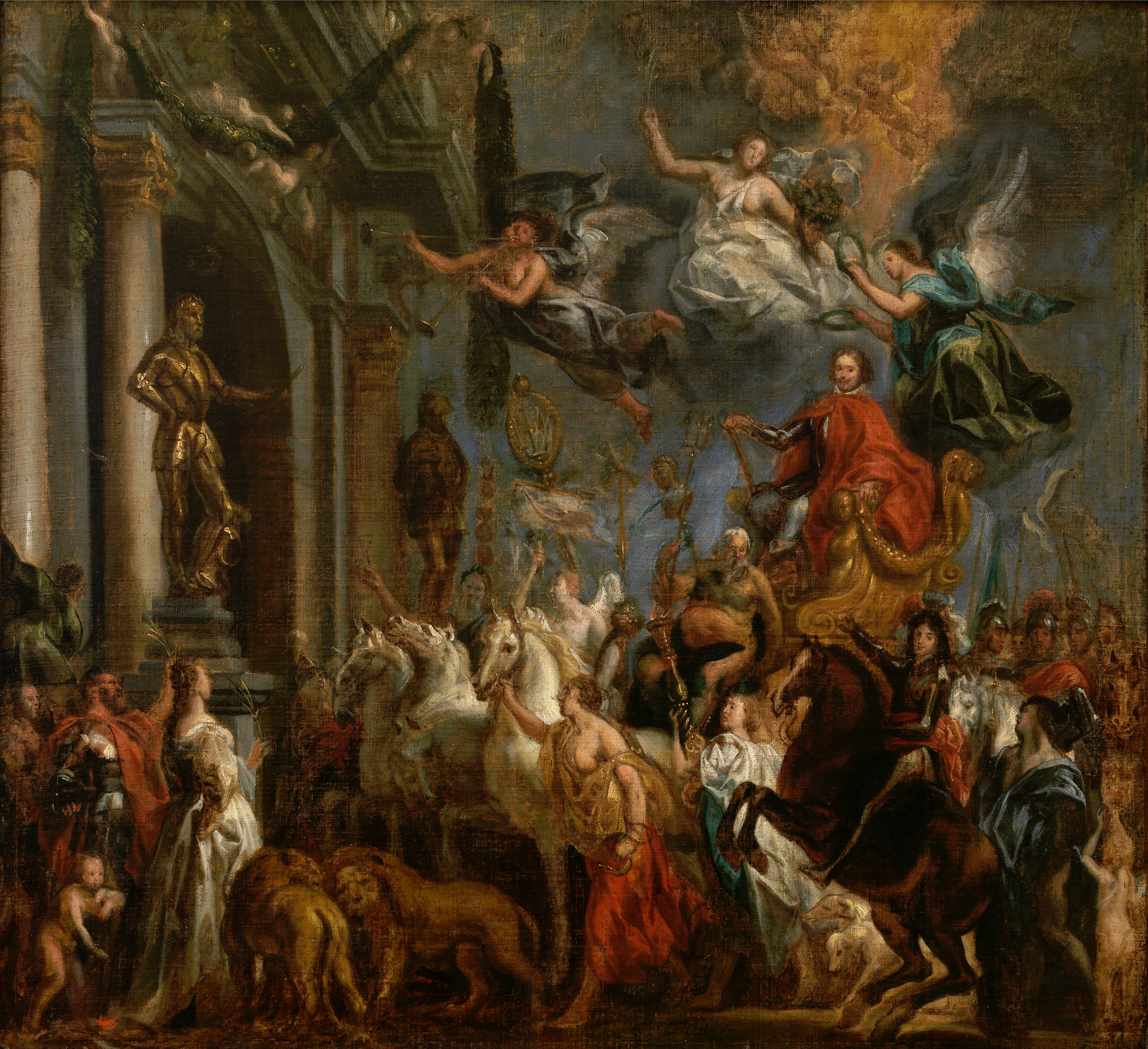
Sketch, c.1651, Royal Museum of Fine Arts, Antwerp

== Description and style ==
Given the large number of similarities between the two works' iconography, Jordaens' probable model was a print by Salomon Savery after a drawing by David Vinckboons. This drawing was an allegory of Frederick Henry's triumphal entry into the Hague after the victories of Wesel and 's-Hertogenbosch, his two great successes in the Eighty Years' War.

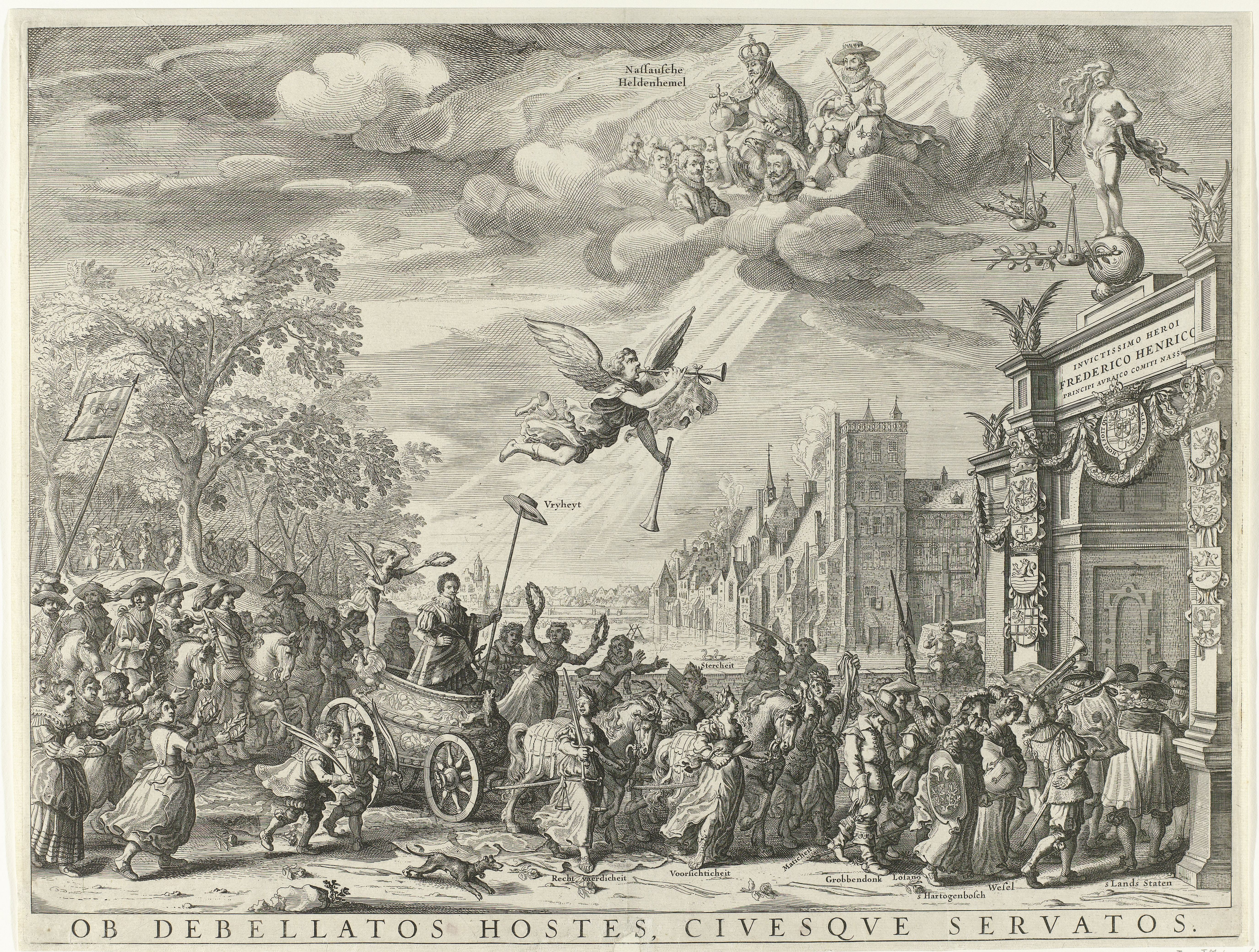
Salomon Savery and David Vinckboons, Allegory of Frederick Henry's Triumphal Entry to the Hague, 1629

In Jordaens' work, Frederick Henry is shown wearing armour and a deep red cloak (reminiscent of ancient Roman triumphal dress) seated on a throne in a triumphal chariot. A golden sculpture of Victory behind him holds two crowns, placing the one in her right hand on Frederick Henry's head and holding the other towards Frederick Henry's son William II of Orange, shown as a young horseman in the bottom right. The nude Hymen behind William crowns him with a golden garland surmounted by a crown - within that wreath are two joined hands, symbolising William's marriage to Charles I's daughter Mary.

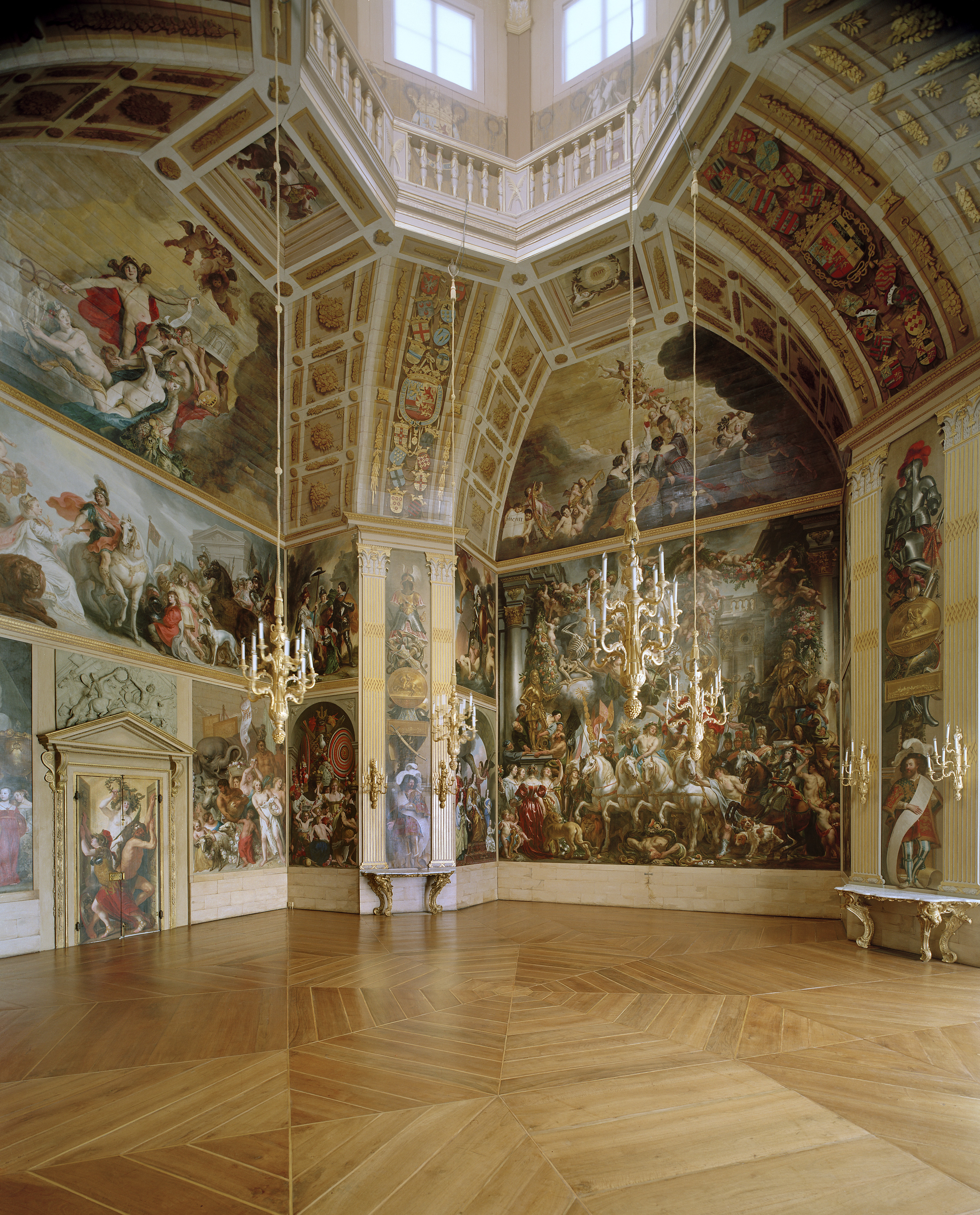
The Oranjezaal

Frederick Henry's chariot is drawn by four white horses with golden harness. A male figure wearing only a pseudo-Turkish dress rides one of them, holding a cornucopia of fruits and ears of grain, a symbol of abundance. Beside the horses Minerva (left) and Mercury (right, in a winged hat and sandals) act as grooms and symbolise Frederick Henry's virtues of wisdom, martial virtue and cunning. Under their hooves the horses trample two terrible serpents (Discord) and a figure biting a heart (Envy). Two lions in front of the horses symbolise bravery and courage, whilst four of the Muses to the far left symbolise the four provinces of the Dutch Republic.

In the background is a triumphal arch flanked by two golden statues on pedestals, representing Frederick Henry's father William the Silent and his half-brother Maurice of Nassau (right), who both preceded him as Stadtholder. People gather around the statues to watch the triumphal procession. Above the horses a winged figure with a trumpet (Fame) beats back a skeleton, whilst higher still a woman in a white robe holds palm branches in both hands. She is surrounded by putti unrolling a long scroll inscribed ULTIMUS ANTE OMNES DE PARTA PACE TRIUMPHUS (Fairest above all triumphs is that through which peace is gained), shown by a letter in the National Library of the Netherlands to have been invented by Huygens. This refers to the Peace of Munster, the section of the Treaty of Westphalia of 1648 which guaranteed the Dutch Republic's independence and abandoned all Spanish claims to its lands. Frederick died before the Treaty but his military victories had decisively paved the way for it. Several other putti at the very top of the painting hold a long festoon full of fruit, whilst others tip another cornucopia of coins and jewelry over Frederick Henry, symbolising riches and prosperity.
