= Clärchen's Ballroom =

Dance hall in Berlin

- Clärchens Ballhaus
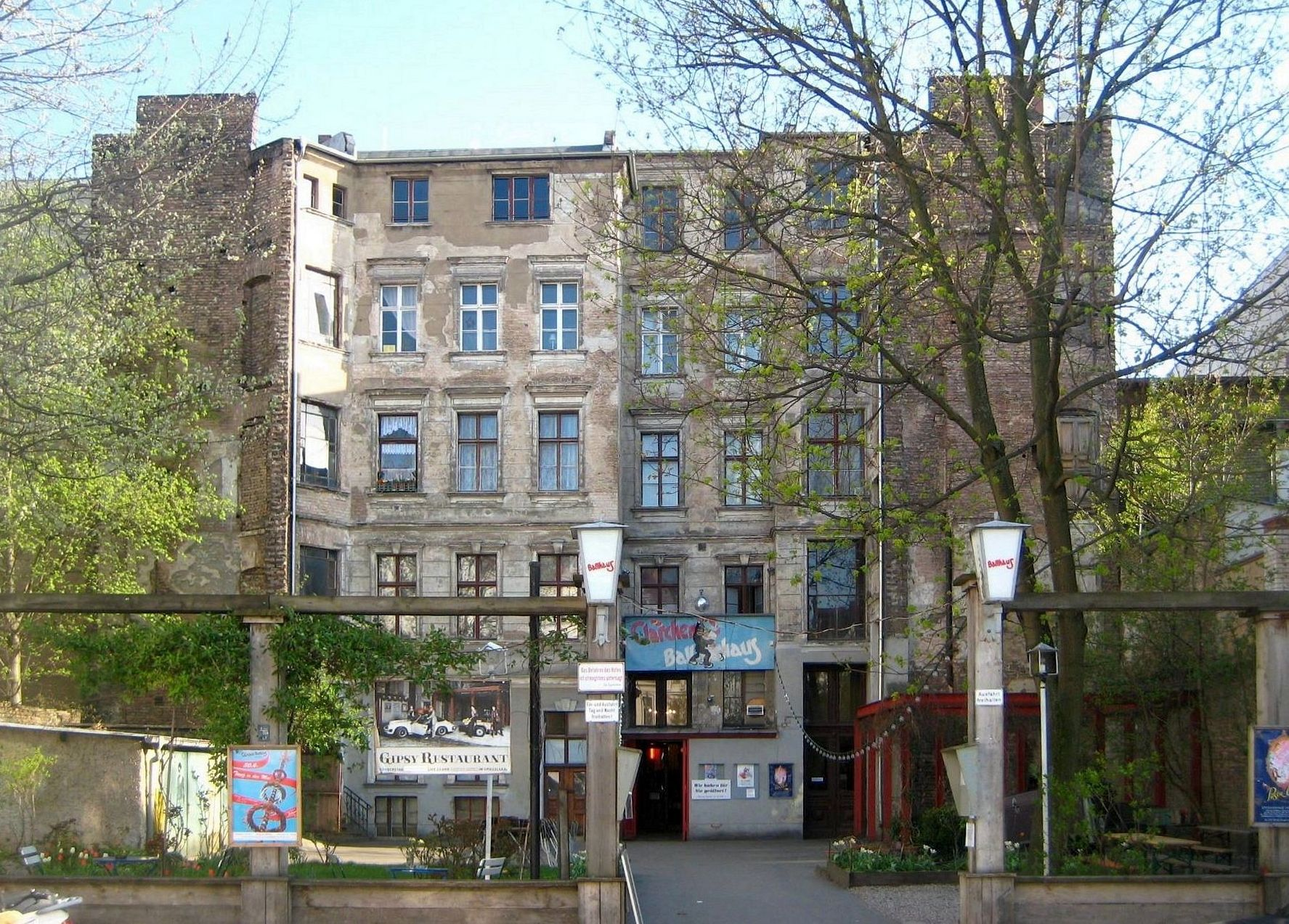
- The building in 2010
- Interactive map of the Clärchen's Ballroom area

General information
- Type: Ballroom
- Location: Auguststraße 24, 10117 Berlin
- Coordinates: 52.526944°N 13.396667°E
- Construction started: 1890s
- Opened: 13 September 1913

Clärchen's Ballroom is a ballroom in Berlin, Germany that is also part saloon and restaurant. It is located in the historic district of Spandauer Vorstadt, which is today's Berlin-Mitte, at Auguststraße 24.

It first opened on 13 September 1913 and, of the once 900 such ballrooms in Berlin, it is the only one remaining. Beginning with the German Empire, it survived two world wars and five systems of government, open for business throughout.

It has protected status as Berliner Kulturdenkmal.

== History ==
Fritz Bühler (1862–1929) and his wife Clara Bühler (1886–1971) opened "Bühler's Ballhaus" on September 13, 1913, in the rear building of Auguststrasse 24/25. The house was built around 1895 with two halls: the dance hall on the ground floor and the mirror hall on the upper floor. After Fritz Bühler's death, Clara initially continued to run the dance hall, by now known as "Clärchens Ballhaus", on her own. In 1932, she married Arthur Habermann (1885-1967), who supported her in her work. The front building was destroyed in World War II, but operations resumed after the end of the war. Clärchens Ballhaus would remain a private company over the coming GDR era.

In 1965, and taking much pressure, the ruins of the former front building were removed. The area is still undeveloped today. From 1967 to 1989 the management of the ballroom went to Clärchen's stepdaughter Elfriede Wolff (daughter of Arthur Habermann) and her husband. Then, their son Stefan took over the business.

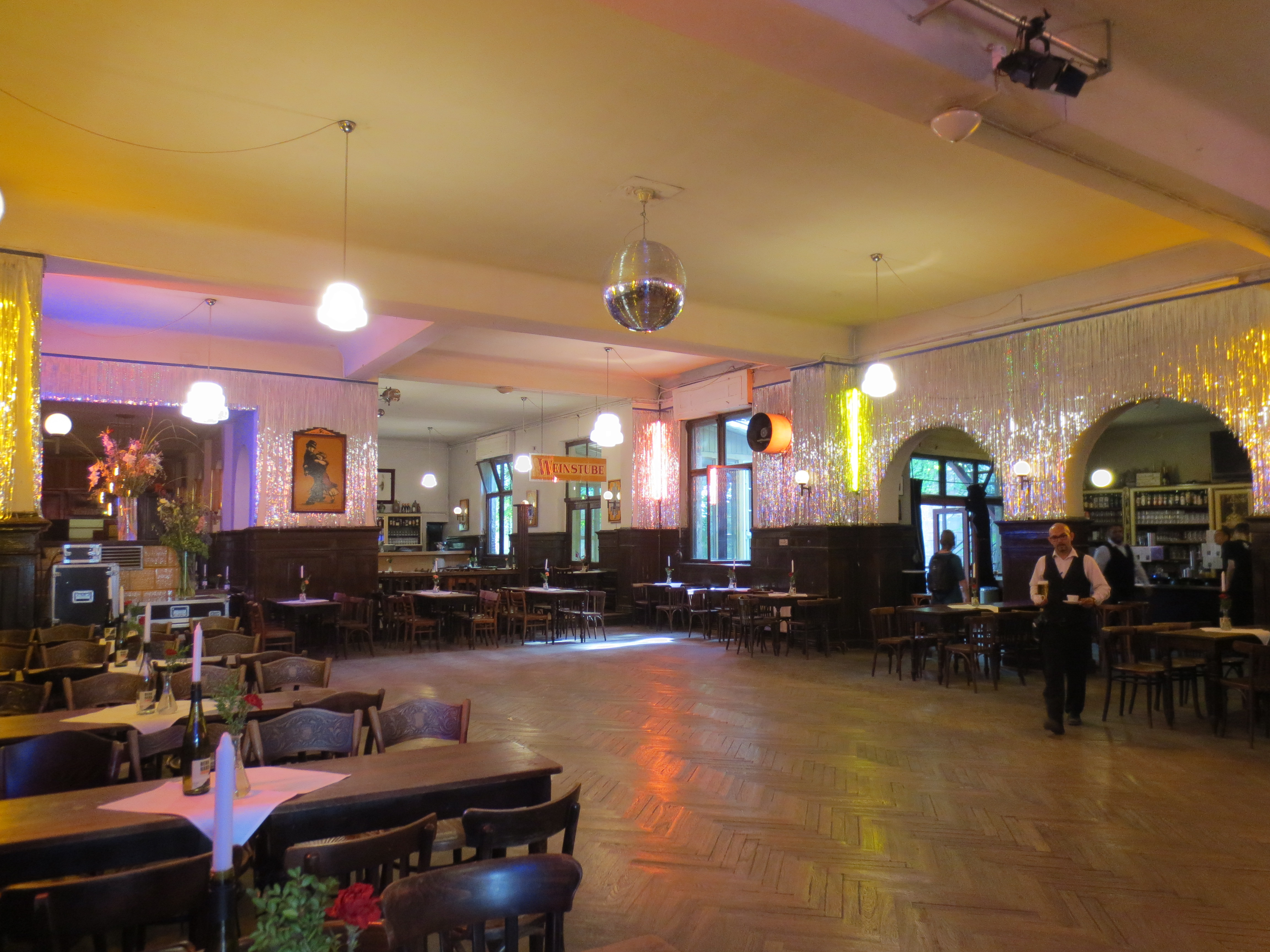
Ground floor, 2014

After German reunification, Clara Habermann's biological daughter was granted the property, whose son in turn sold the building in 2003. The new owner, Hans-Joachim Sander, left the family business, which then ceased operations after 91 years. After the previous operators left the Ballhaus on New Year's Eve 2004, Christian Schulz and David Regehr took over the location, leaving it largely unchanged. Since then, the space in front of the Ballhaus has also been managed, where the front building stood before the Second World War. The hall of mirrors on the upper floor, which was only used as a storage room for years, has since been used as an event room.

In 2018 the house was bought by Yoram Roth who moved to replace Regehr and Schulz after disagreements in late 2019 while keeping the "spirit" of the establishment. After renovations, the Ballhaus reopened in July 2020 with a new operator.

== Importance ==
Clärchen's Ballhaus is one of Berlin's last remaining dance halls from as early as 1900. During the GDR era, it was known to both East and West Germans as a meeting place.

In the media it was repeatedly represented in reports, for example in the film by Wilma Pradetto about the cloakroom operator Günter Schmidtke, in the documentary Edith bei Clärchen (Andreas Kleinert 1985) or on ZDF. A 2017 documentary by Maria Wischnewski had Katharina Thalbach remember her childhood there, and Wim Wenders called it a 'Time capsule'.

It also served as a filming location for movies Stauffenberg (2004), Inglourious Basterds (2009) and We Do It For Money (2014). In 2019 Max Raabe's MTV Unplugged concert was recorded in the Ballhaus.

== Spiegelsaal, Gallery ==
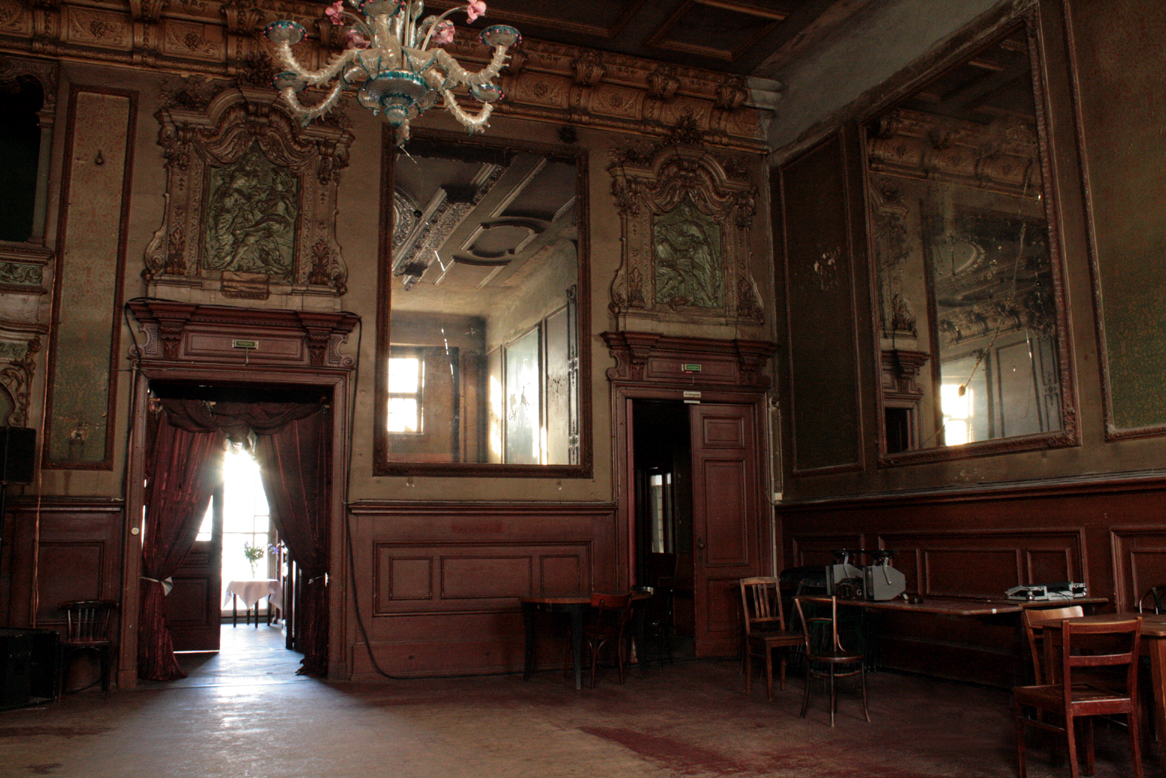
Clärchens Ballhaus, Spiegelsaal

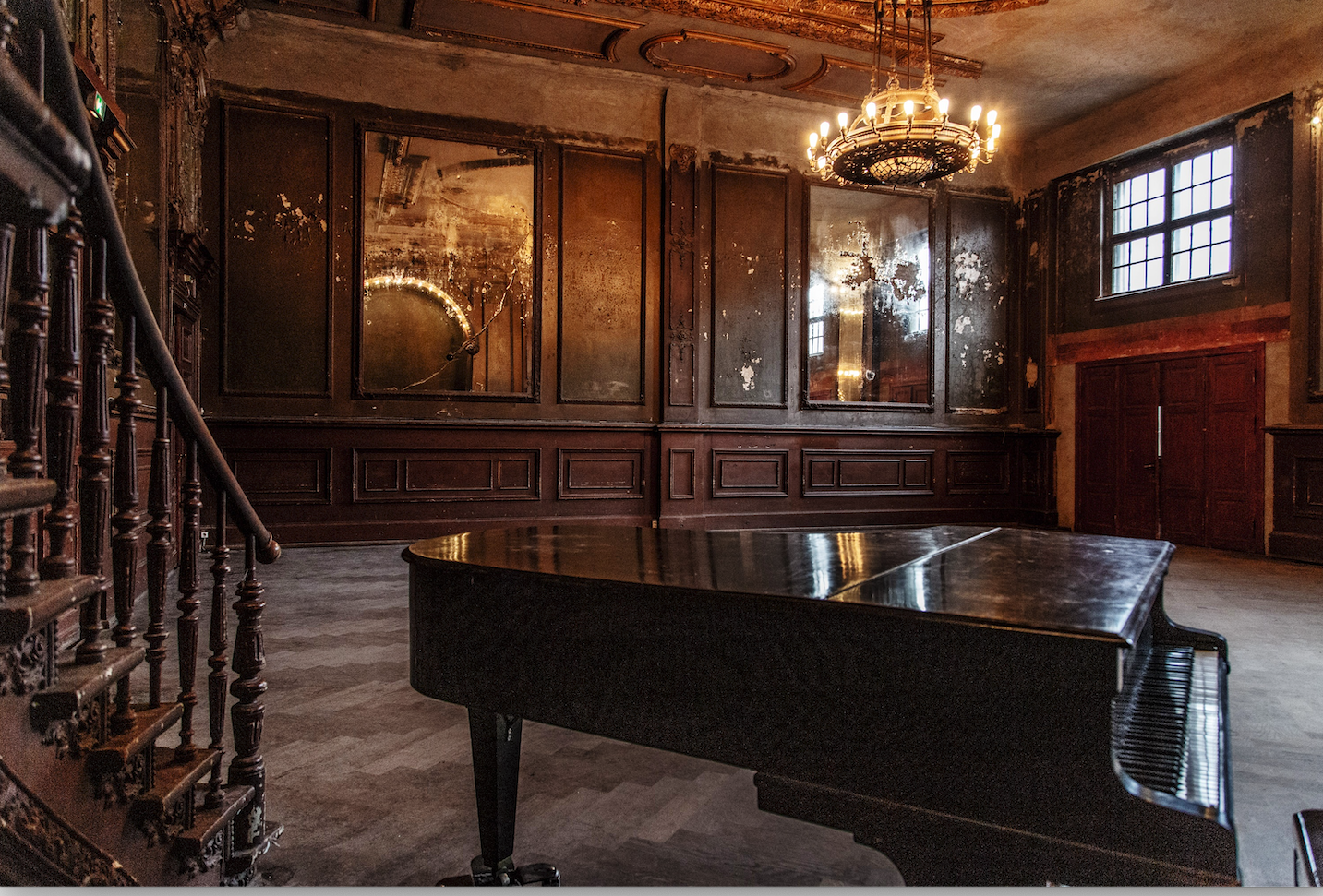
Clärchens Ballhaus, Spiegelsaal, 2020

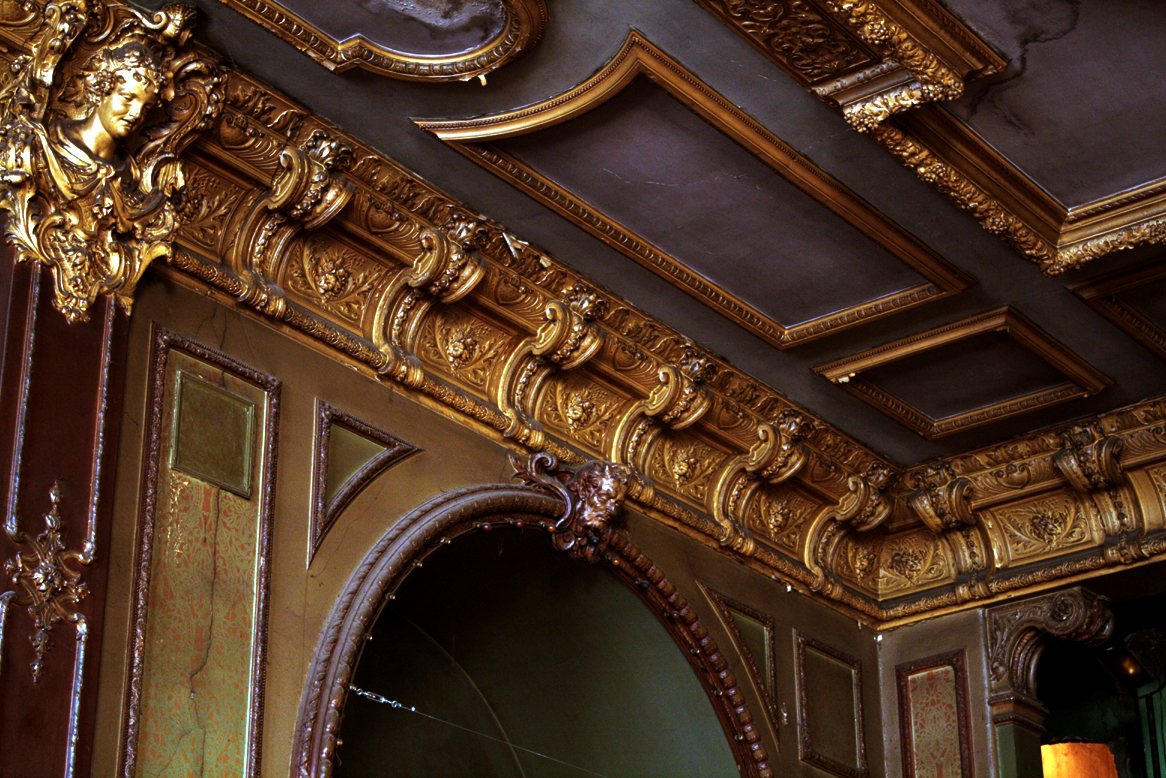
Clärchens Ballhaus, Spiegelsaal, Detail

== Media ==
- Marion Kiesow: Berlin tanzt in Clärchens Ballhaus. 100 Jahre Vergnügen – eine Kulturgeschichte, Nicolai Verlag, Berlin 2013, ISBN 978-3-89479-784-3.
- Maria Wischnewski: Geheimnissvolle Orte - Clärchen's Ballhaus, 21 November 2017, rbb
