= Oranjezaal =

Painted hall in Huis ten Bosch

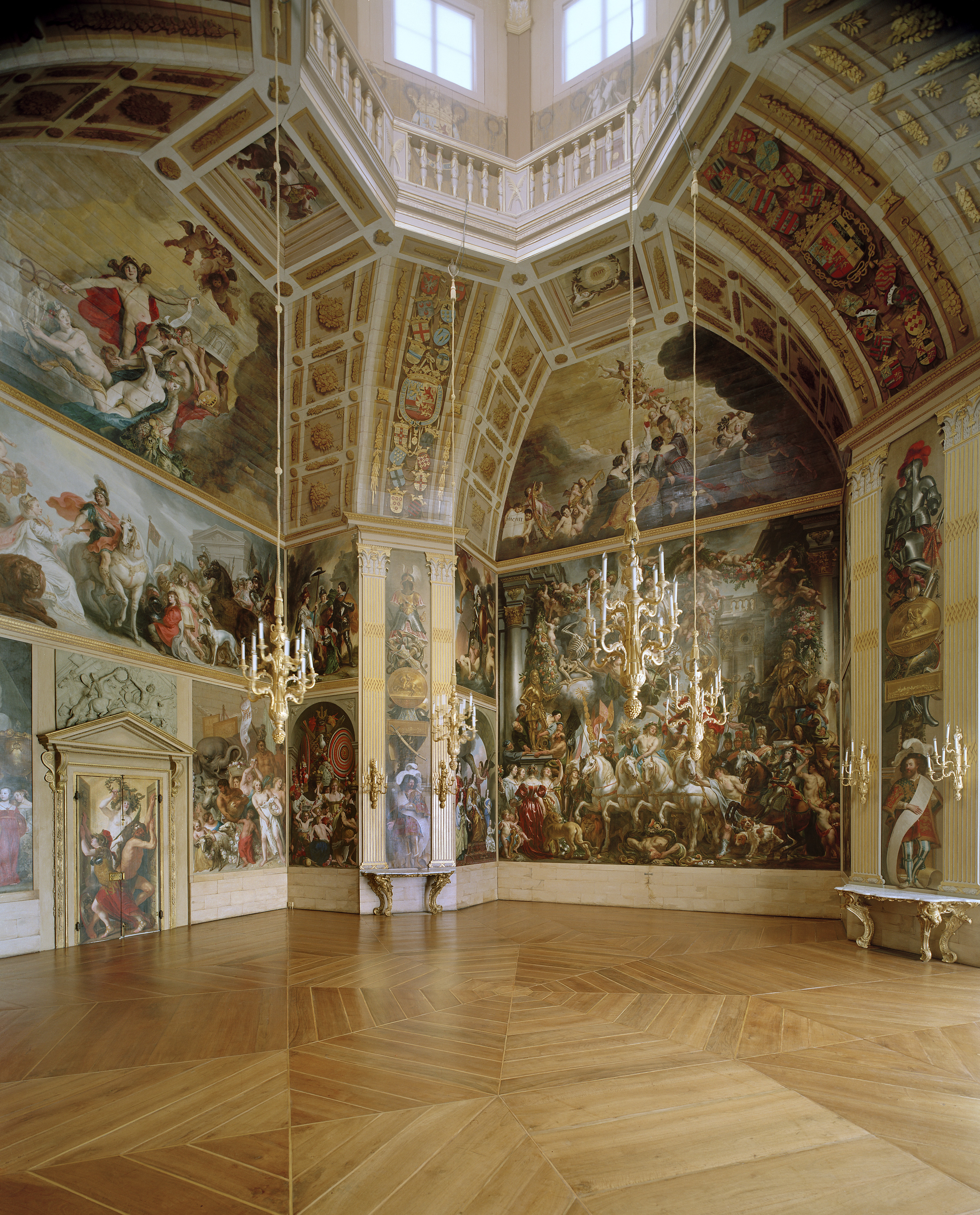
View of the North-east corner

The Oranjezaal refers to a painted ballroom in the royal palace Huis ten Bosch in The Hague. It was once, together with its neighboring Chinese room, part of the first national museum of the Netherlands founded in 1800 called the Nationale Konst-Gallery. The supervisor Cornelis Sebille Roos appointed Jan Gerard Waldorp as the first custodian and curator to receive visitors (for 6 stuivers) and explain the collection.

The Oranjezaal or Orange room was commissioned upon the death of Frederick Henry, Prince of Orange in 1647 and was built during the years 1648-1651 by Jacob van Campen under the direction of Constantijn Huygens and Amalia van Solms. The painters were chosen as the best of the Netherlands, north and south, who painted in the Baroque style of Rubens, and were mostly of the Catholic faith. Therefore the total of 31 paintings decorating the room from floor to ceiling, are rather more typical of Flemish Baroque painting than Dutch Golden Age painting. Over a century later the room became part of the first national museum of the Netherlands, but it is not normally open to the public.

Besides Jacob van Campen, the painters Theodoor van Thulden, Caesar van Everdingen, Salomon de Bray, Thomas Willeboirts Bosschaert, Jan Lievens, Christiaen van Couwenbergh, Pieter Soutman, Gonzales Coques, Jacob Jordaens, Pieter de Grebber, Adriaen Hanneman and Gerard van Honthorst all made contributions.

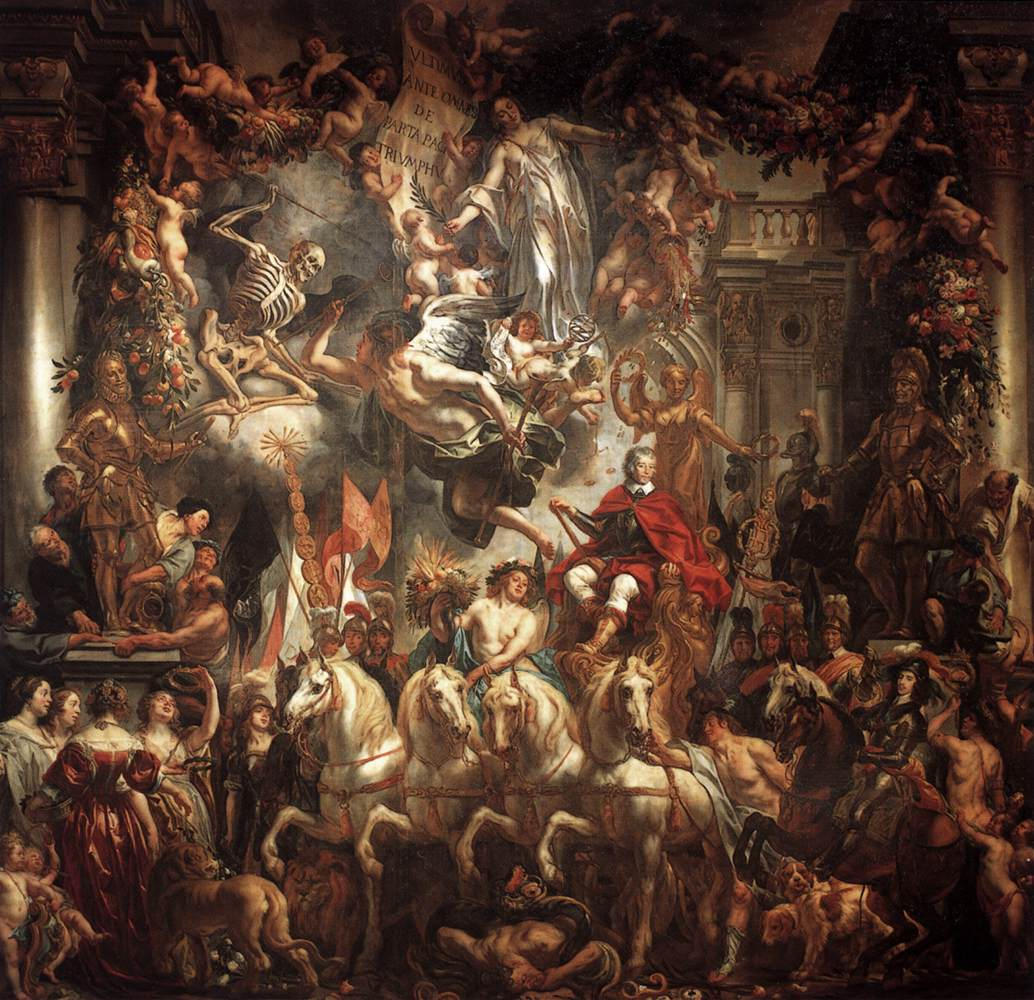
Triumph of Frederick Henry, Prince of Orange, by Jacob Jordaens

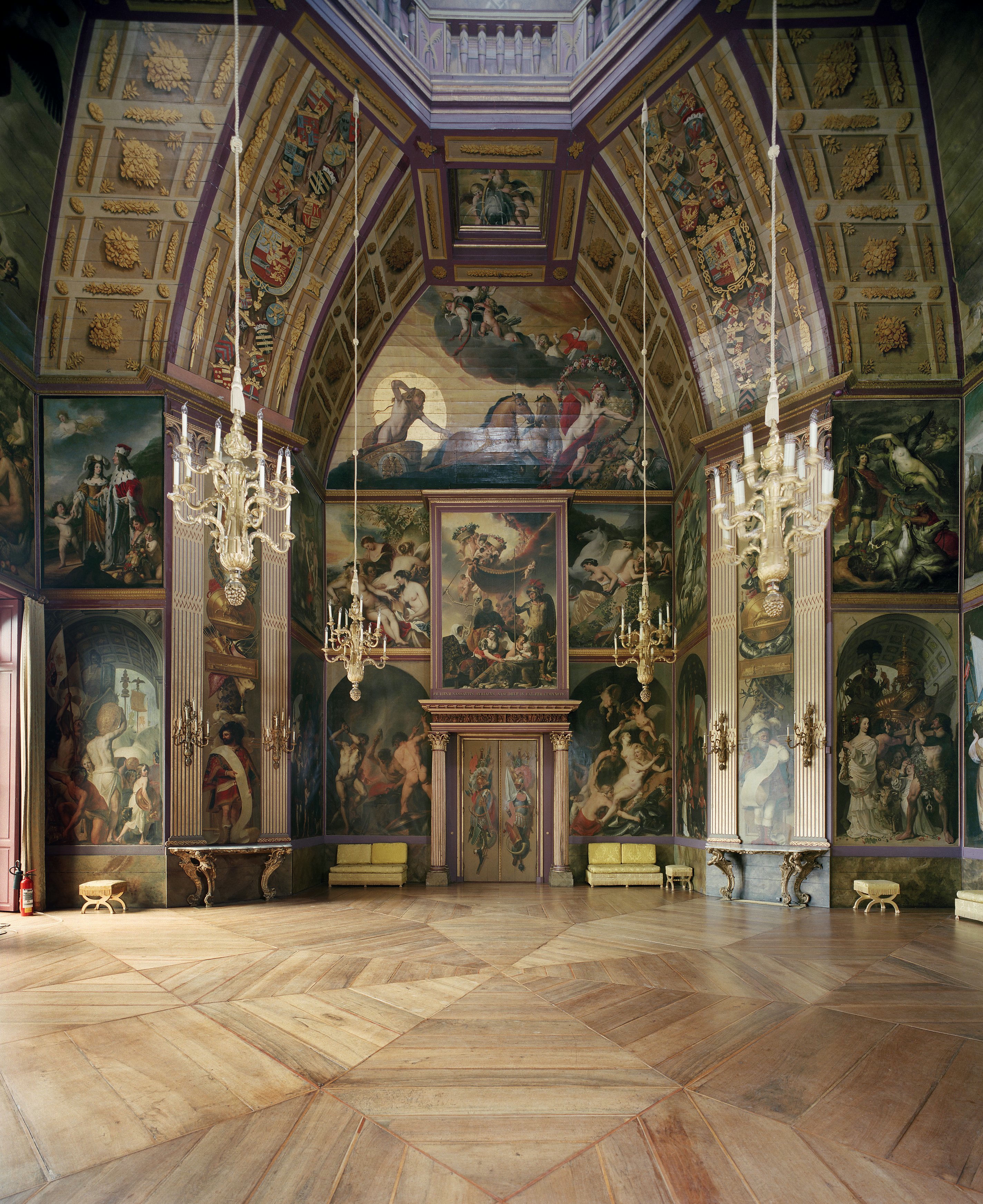
View of the South-west corner

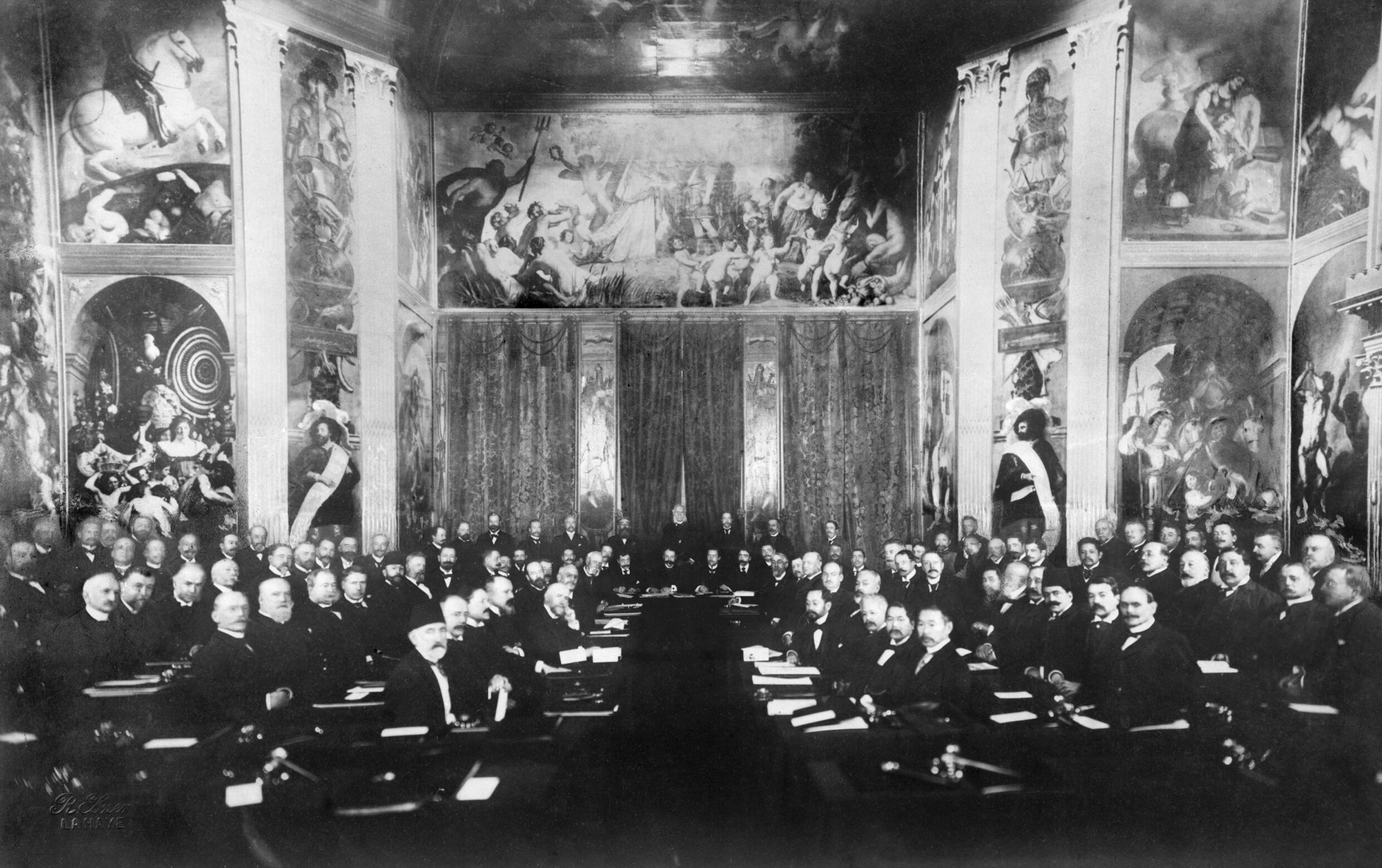
The First Hague Conventions of 1899 and 1907

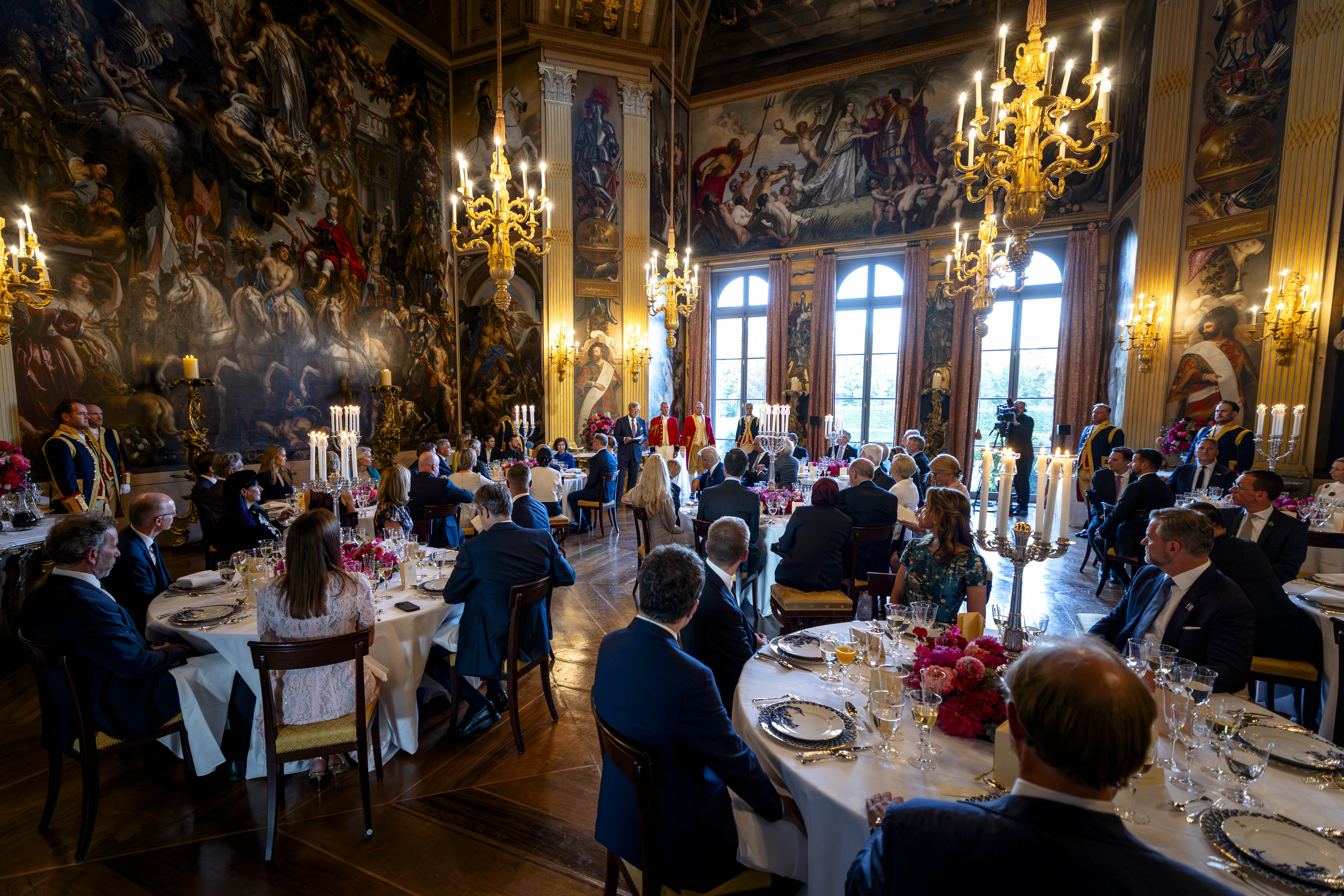
Dinner in the Oranjezaal during the 2025 The Hague NATO summit
