= Huis ten Bosch =

Palace in The Hague, Netherlands

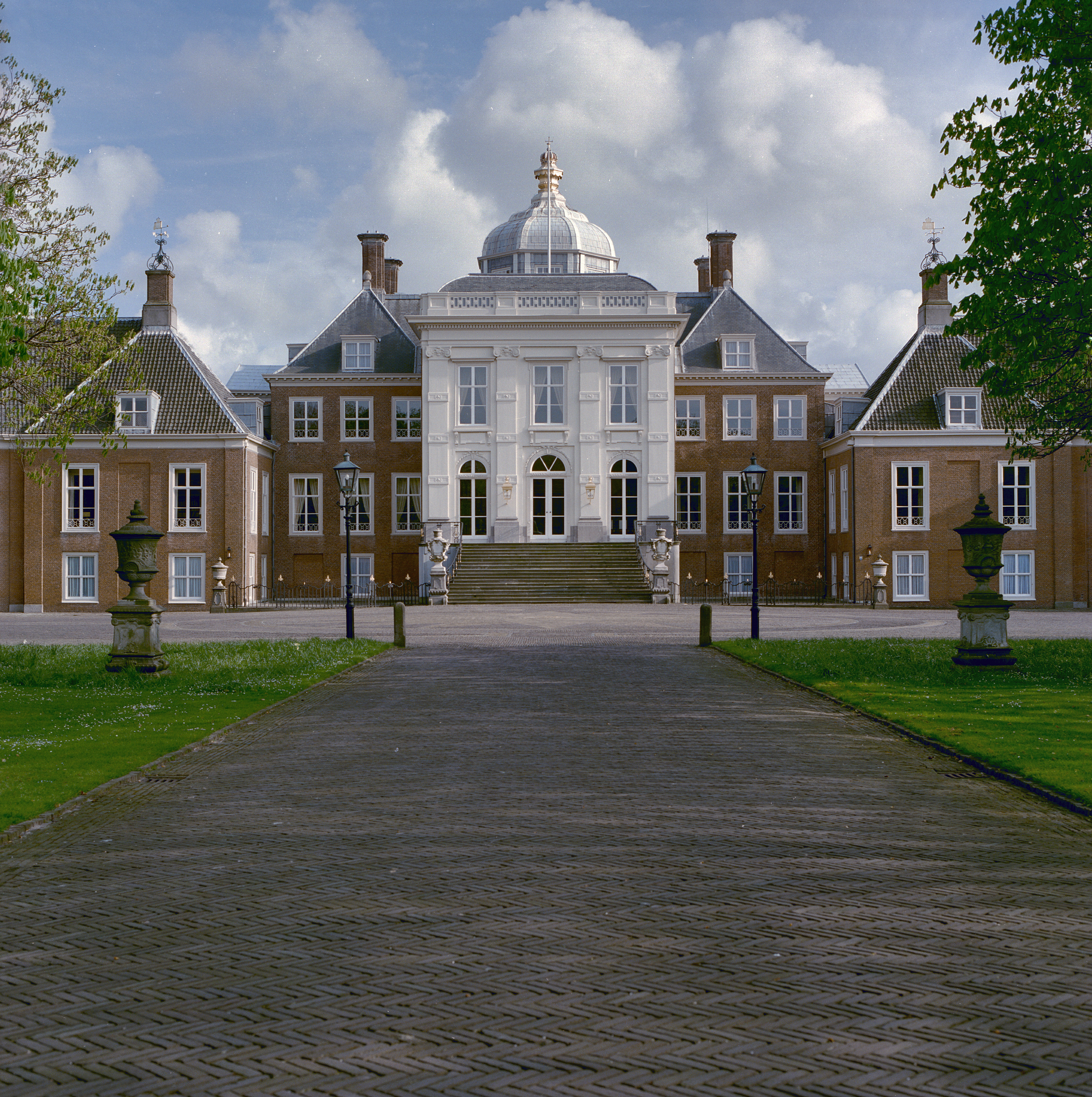
- Front of Huis ten Bosch

- Location within Netherlands

General information
- Type: Palace
- Architectural style: Dutch Baroque
- Location: The Hague, Netherlands, 's-Gravenhaagse Bos 10
- Coordinates: 52°5′35″N 4°20′38″E
- Current tenants: Willem-Alexander of the Netherlands
- Groundbreaking: 2 September 1645
- Renovated: 1734–1737
- Client: Amalia of Solms-Braunfels
- Owner: Government of the Netherlands

Design and construction
- Architect: Pieter Post

Renovating team
- Architect: Daniel Marot

Huis ten Bosch (Dutch: Paleis Huis ten Bosch, pronounced [paːˈlɛis ˌɦœys tɛm ˈbɔs]; English: "House in the Woods") is a royal palace in The Hague, Netherlands. It is one of three official residences of the Dutch monarch; the two others being the Noordeinde Palace in The Hague and the Royal Palace of Amsterdam.

Huis ten Bosch was the home of Queen Beatrix from 1981 to her abdication in 2013; King Willem-Alexander and his family moved in on 13 January 2019. A replica of the palace was built in Sasebo, Japan, in the country's largest theme park bearing the same name.

== History ==
=== 17th and 18th century ===
Construction of Huis ten Bosch began on 2 September 1645, under the direction of Bartholomeus Drijffhout, and to a design by Pieter Post and Jacob van Campen. It was commissioned by Amalia of Solms-Braunfels, the wife of Stadtholder Frederick Henry, on a parcel of land granted to her by the States General. The first stone was laid by Elizabeth of Bohemia.

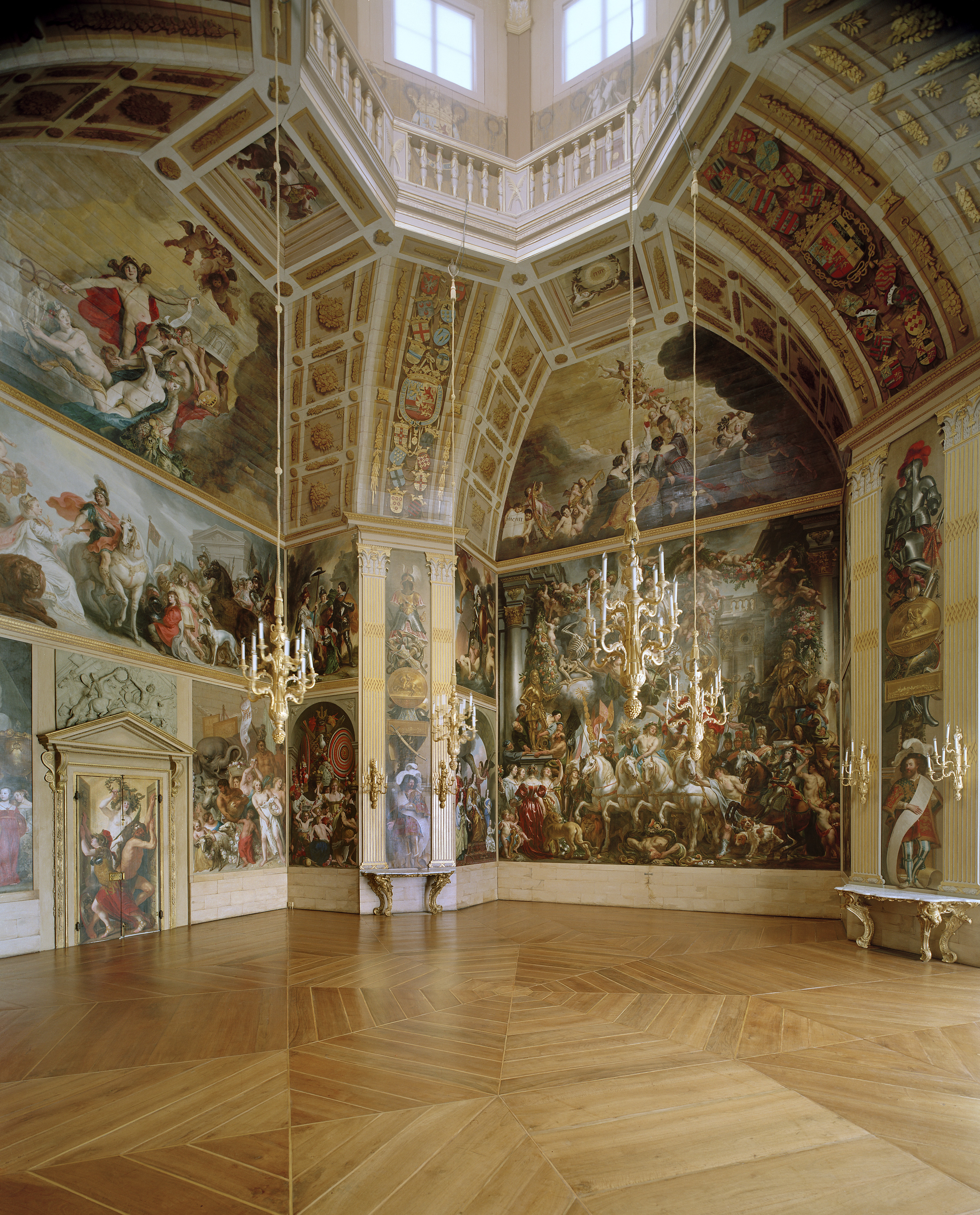
The Orange Hall (Dutch: Oranjezaal) in Huis ten Bosch

After her husband's death in 1647, Amalia dedicated the palace to him. Led by the architect-painters Jacob van Campen and Pieter Post, other major artists of the day, such as Gerard van Honthorst, Jacob Jordaens, Thomas Willeboirts Bosschaert, Theodoor van Thulden, Caesar van Everdingen, Salomon de Bray, Pieter Soutman, Gonzales Coques, Pieter de Grebber, Adriaen Hanneman, Pieter Hermansz Verelst and Jan Lievens, filled the Oranjezaal ("Orange Hall") with paintings glorifying the late prince. Between 1734 and 1737 the architect Daniel Marot added two wings to the palace, including a new dining room.

Over the next century and a half, the palace would change possession from the Nassau family, the king of Prussia, and many stadtholders until the Batavian Revolution in 1795. The government of the newly created Batavian Republic gave the palace to the Batavian (Dutch) people, who have owned it since then.

=== 19th and 20th century ===
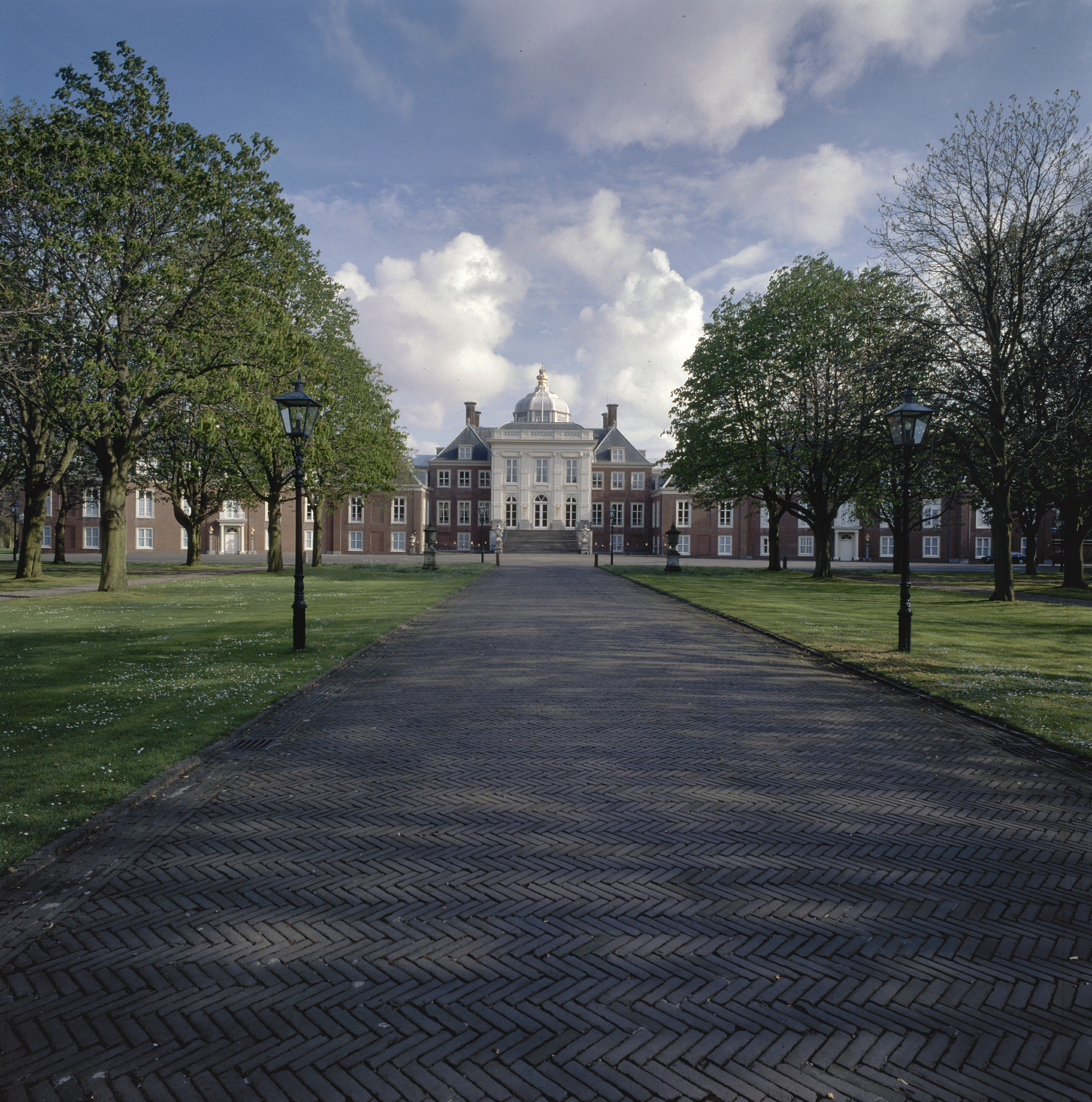
View from the north

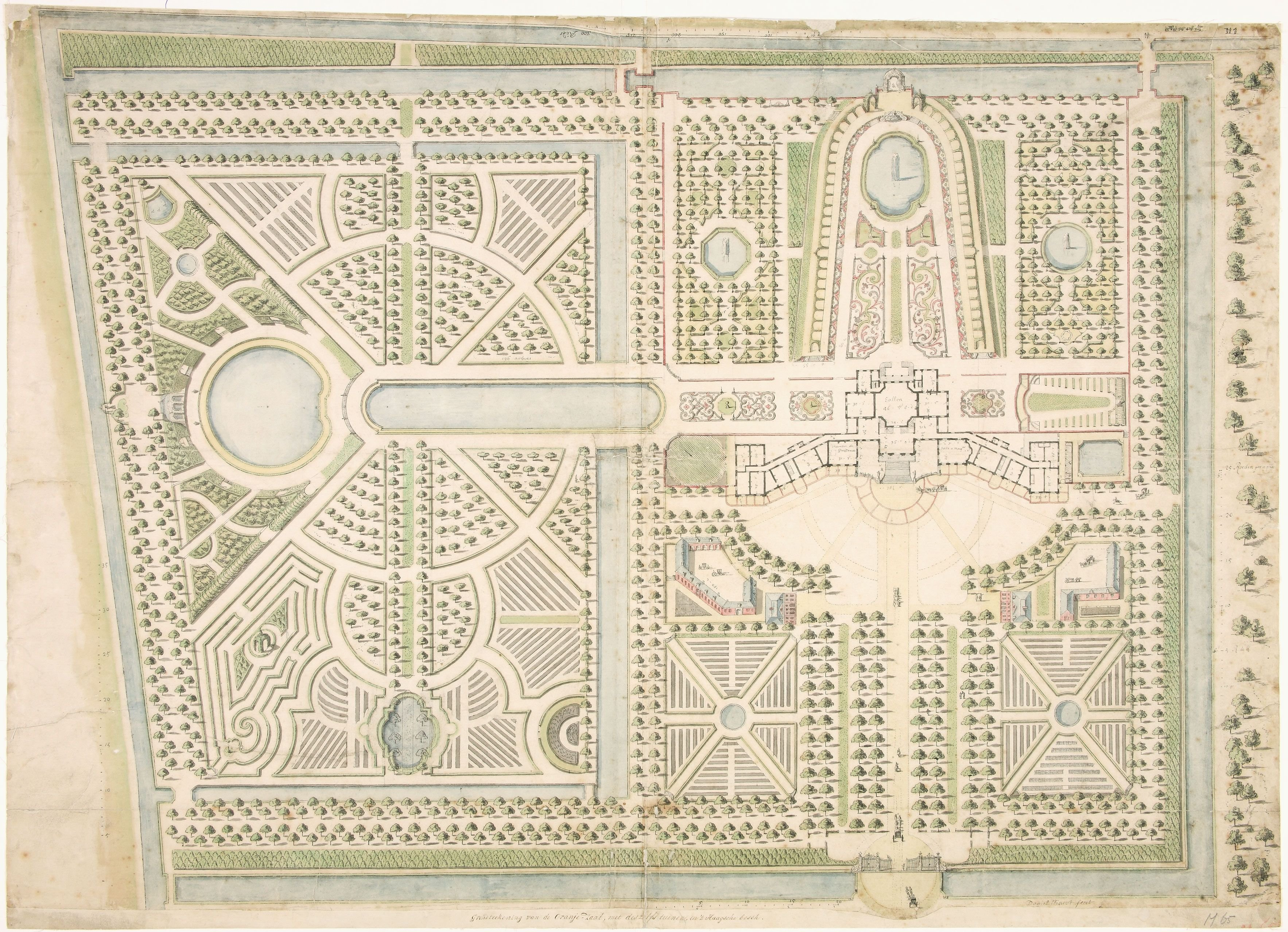
Design of the garden of Huis ten Bosch by the architect Daniël Marot

The National Art Gallery, predecessor of the Rijksmuseum, was housed in the building from 1800 to 1805. Napoleon Bonaparte's brother, Louis, king of Holland, briefly lived in the palace between 1805 and 1807.

When William Frederick, Prince of Orange-Nassau, the only surviving son of the last stadtholder, was proclaimed king of the Netherlands as William I in 1815, he made Huis ten Bosch Palace one of his official residences. It became a favourite location for many members of the royal family. In 1899 the palace was the site of several meetings of the First International Peace Conference at The Hague. During World War I it became the primary residence of Queen Wilhelmina.

Queen Wilhelmina and her family were forced to evacuate the palace for Britain (from which the Queen's family, but not the Queen herself, would move on to Canada) when the German army invaded the Netherlands during World War II. The Nazi administration planned to demolish the palace, but the controller convinced them otherwise. However, the palace was damaged beyond habitation.

Between 1950 and 1956, the palace was restored and once again became a royal residence. It became the prime residence once more in 1981.

The palace has undergone major reconstructions since it was built. Currently, it consists of a central part with two long wings, spanning approximately 110 metres from end to end.

=== 21st century ===
The palace has been inhabited by the Dutch King Willem-Alexander since 2019.

==== Renovation ====
The renovation of Huis ten Bosch Palace began in 2014 and took about four years, so it was completed in 2019. The renovation included making the palace more sustainable, renewing installations and adjusting the layout; by replacing the roof and the landing staircase, renovating historic stucco ceilings and the facade, removing asbestos and wood rot, and renewing technical installations, according to Architectenweb. The palace was also given a new sandstone colour and green window frames, to restore its nineteenth-century appearance.

The renovation took longer and turned out to be more expensive than initially budgeted. Over time, an additional 4.1 million euros was added on top of the 59 million that had already been budgeted. The renovation took five years and cost a total of €63.1 million in taxpayers' money. This amount includes costs for the renovation of the building itself and the furnishings. The private facilities of the royal family have also been tackled, but this part was not financed from tax money.

==== NATO summit 2025 ====
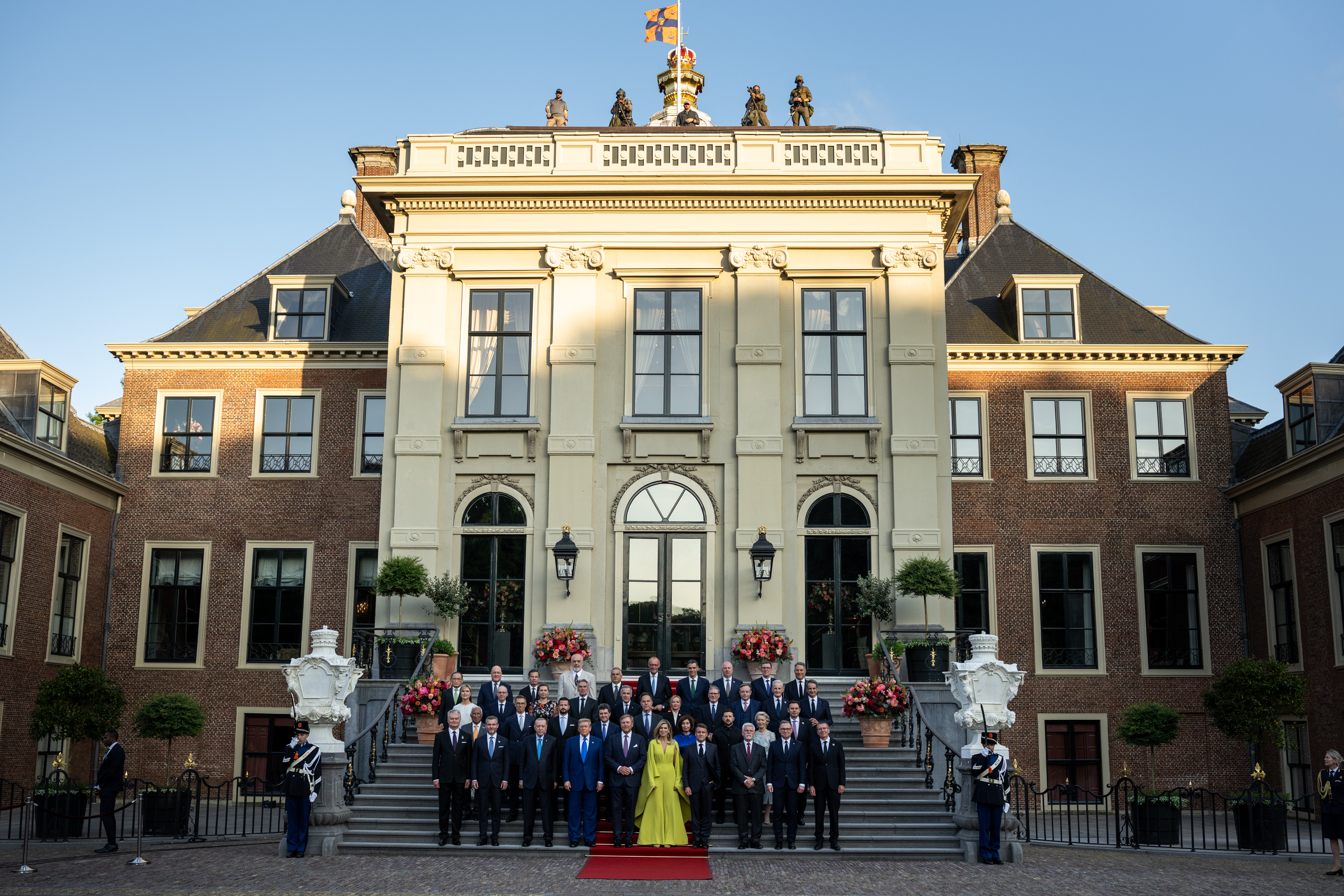
During the NATO summit in 2025, a group photo was taken on the steps, with armed soldiers on the roof

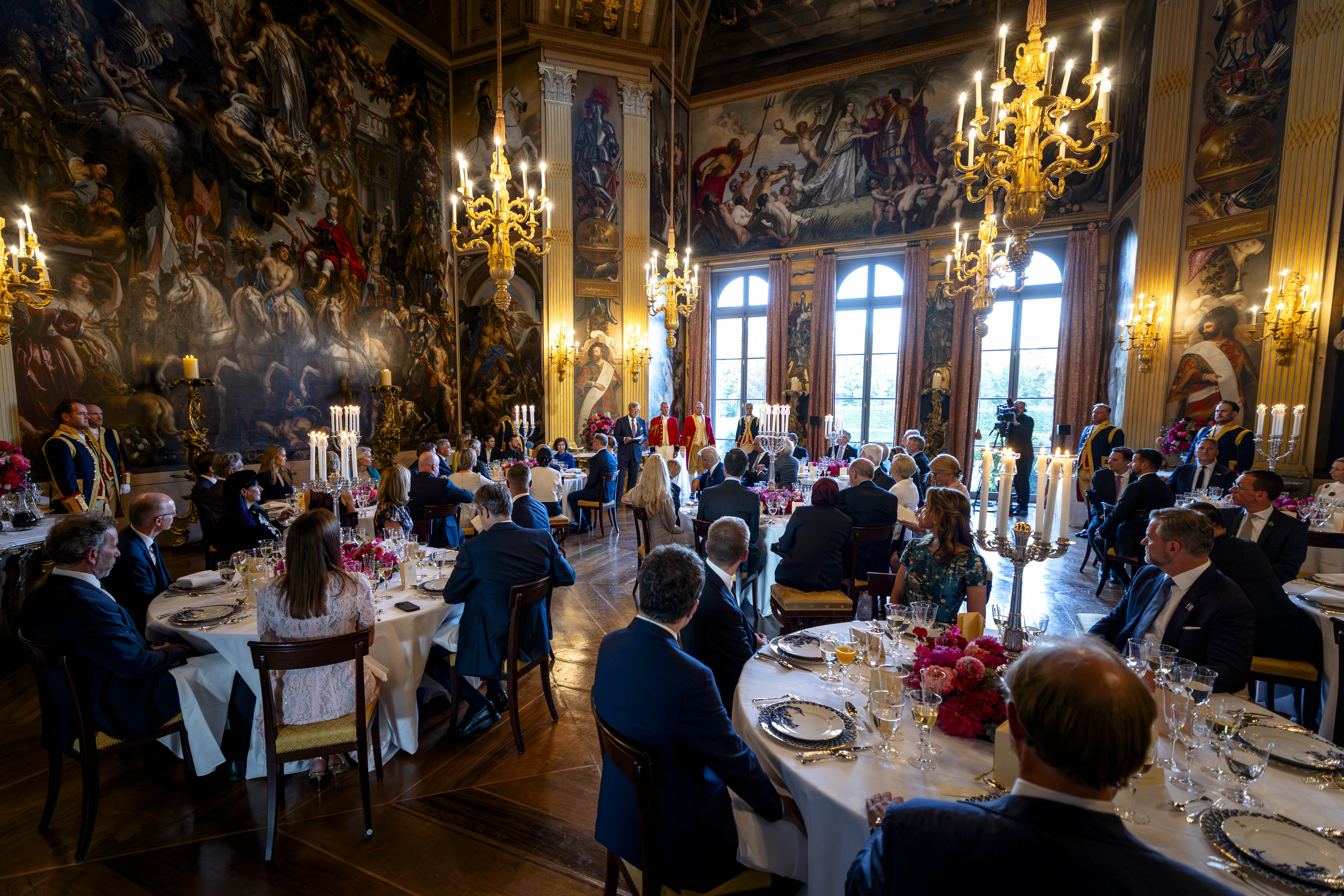
Dinner in the Oranjezaal during the NATO summit in 2025

In June 2025, the palace served as a backdrop to the traditional pre-summit dinner for the 2025 The Hague NATO summit. The pre-summit dinner was opened with a speech from his majesty King Willem-Alexander in the 'Oranjezaal', who invited US President Donald Trump to spend the night at the palace as his personal guest, the first time ever such an invitation was issued to a non-royal foreign dignitary. After a warm welcome where Trump met Catharina-Amalia, Princess of Orange for the first time, the king especially asked for attention to Article 3 of the NATO charter in his speech. After a 'restful' night, Trump posted "The day begins in the beautiful Netherlands. The King and Queen are beautiful and spectacular people. Our breakfast meeting was great!"
